= Lands administrative divisions of Queensland =

Queensland counties and county subdivisions

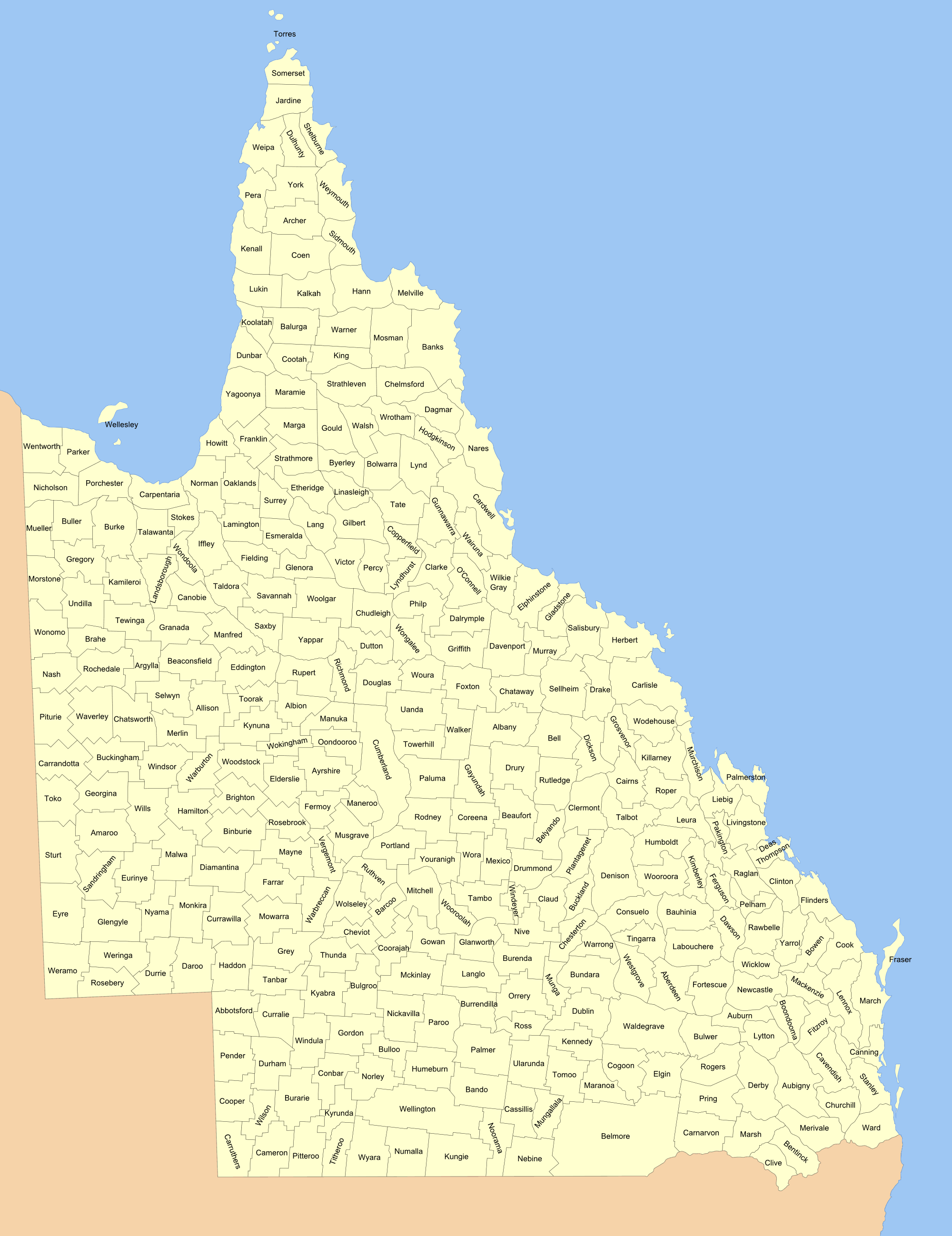
The 319 counties of Queensland in 1901

Lands administrative divisions of Queensland refers to the divisions of Queensland used for the registration of land titles. There are 322 counties, and 5,319 parishes within the state. They are part of the Lands administrative divisions of Australia. Queensland had been divided into 109 counties in the nineteenth century, before the Land Act of 1897 subdivided many of these counties to 319. Some of the eastern counties remained the same, with most of the subdivisions occurring in the west and north. The current counties were named and bounded by the Governor in Council on 7 March 1901.

In 2006, the government sought advice about a plan to abolish the counties and parishes within the state. From 30 November 2015, the government no longer referenced counties and parishes in land information systems however the Museum of Lands, Mapping and Surveying retains a record for historical purposes.

== Land districts ==
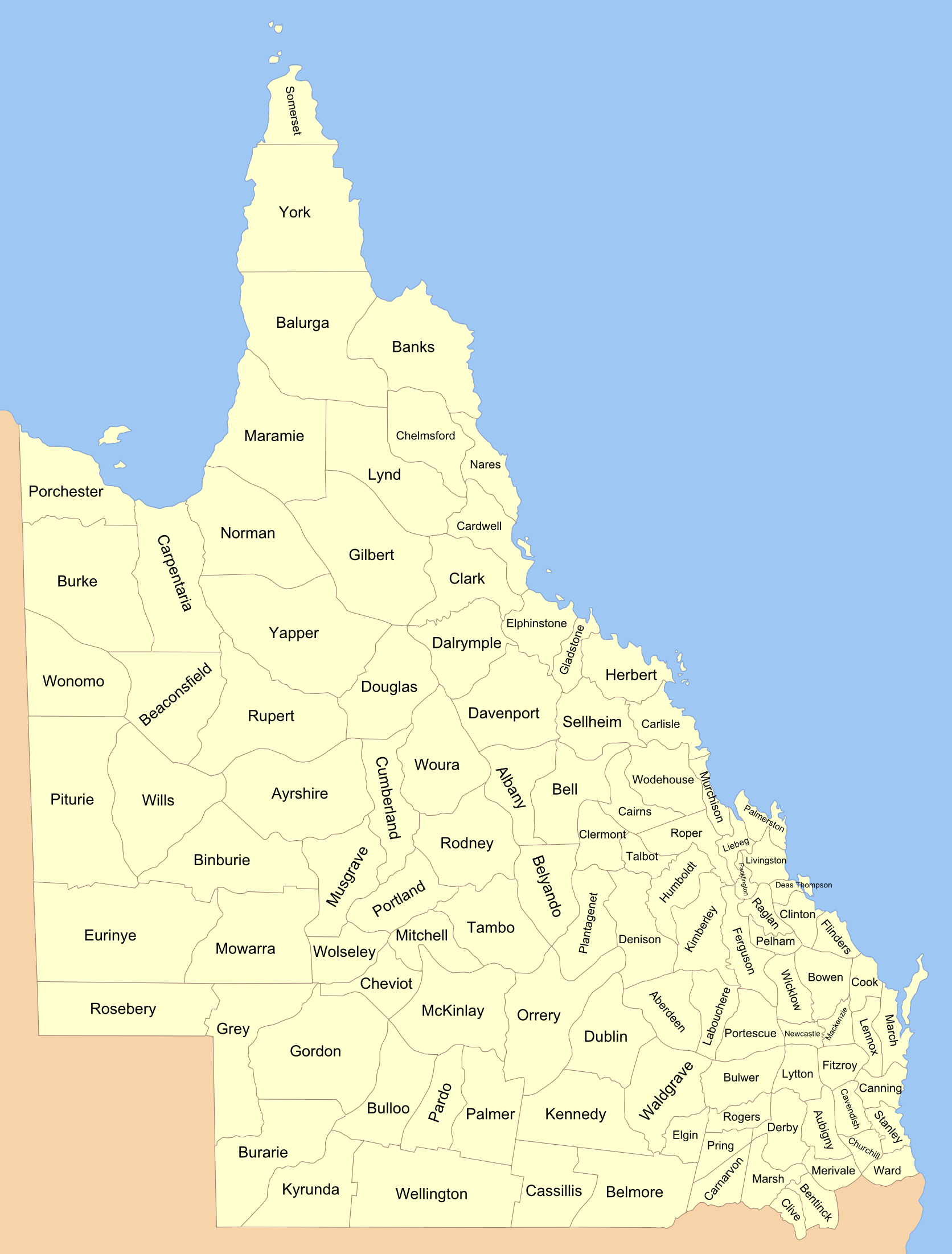
109 counties of Queensland in 1893

Queensland was divided into districts in the mid-nineteenth century. The districts still exist today, forming the top level of Queensland's land titles system.

- Burke (named after Burke and Wills)
- Cook
- Darling Downs
- Leichhardt
- Maranoa
- Mitchell
- Moreton
- North Gregory
- North Kennedy
- Port Curtis
- South Gregory
- South Kennedy
- Warrego
- Wide Bay/Burnett

== 19th century counties ==
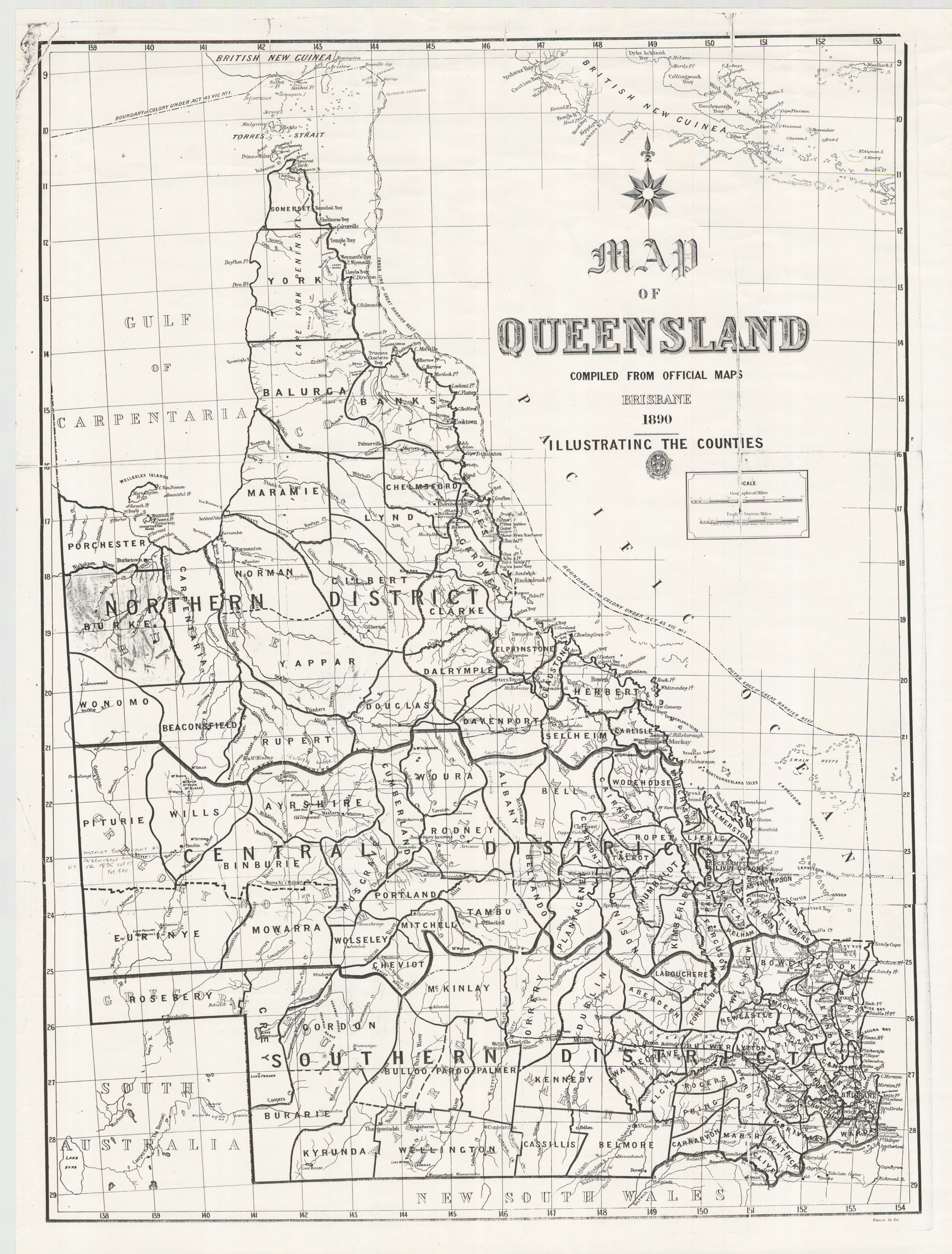
The Queensland counties, 1890

There were 109 counties in Queensland by the late nineteenth century, before they were subdivided into the current 322 counties. All of these original counties continue to exist but many are smaller than they were in the nineteenth century, with many new counties added. For the counties which were subdivided in 1901, the original county remains, usually around the largest town in the area, but smaller than before. For instance the nineteenth century county of Beaconsfield was based around Cloncurry; Cloncurry is still in Beaconsfield, but the county is much smaller, with new counties such as Argylla, Sellwyn and Alison surrounding it.

== List of counties by district ==
District	County	Major towns
Burke	Albion	
Burke	Allison	
Burke	Argylla	
Burke	Beaconsfield	Cloncurry
Burke	Brahe	
Burke	Buller	
Burke	Burke	
Burke	Canobie	
Burke	Carpentaria	
Burke	Chudleigh	
Burke	Douglas	
Burke	Dutton	
Burke	Eddington	
Burke	Esmeralda	
Burke	Fielding	
Burke	Glenora	
Burke	Granada	
Burke	Gregory	
Burke	Howitt	
Burke	Iffley	
Burke	Kamileroi	
Burke	Lamington	
Burke	Landsborough	
Burke	Manfred	
Burke	Morstone	
Burke	Mueller	
Burke	Nash	
Burke	Nicholson	
Burke	Norman	Normanton
Burke	Oaklands	
Burke	Parker	
Burke	Philp	
Burke	Porchester	
Burke	Richmond	
Burke	Rochedale	Mount Isa
Burke	Rupert	
Burke	Savannah	
Burke	Saxby	
Burke	Selwyn	
Burke	Stokes	
Burke	Surrey	
Burke	Talawanta	
Burke	Taldora	
Burke	Tewinga	
Burke	Toorak	
Burke	Undilla	
Burke	Wellesley	Wellesley Islands
Burke	Wentworth	
Burke	Wondoola	
Burke	Wongalee	
Burke	Wonomo	
Burke	Woolgar	
Burke	Yappar	
Cook	Archer	
Cook	Balurga	
Cook	Banks	Cooktown
Cook	Bolwarra	
Cook	Byerley	
Cook	Chelmsford	
Cook	Coen	
Cook	Cootah	
Cook	Copperfield	
Cook	Dagmar	
Cook	Dulhunty	
Cook	Dunbar	
Cook	Etheridge	
Cook	Franklin	
Cook	Gilbert	Georgetown
Cook	Gould	
Cook	Hann	
Cook	Hodgkinson	
Cook	Jardine	
Cook	Kalkah	
Cook	Kendall	
Cook	King	
Cook	Koolatah	
Cook	Lang	
Cook	Linasleigh	
Cook	Lukin	
Cook	Lynd	
Cook	Lyndhurst	
Cook	Maramie	
Cook	Marga	
Cook	Melville	
Cook	Mosman	
Cook	Nares	Cairns
Cook	Pera	
Cook	Percy	
Cook	Shelburne	
Cook	Sidmouth	
Cook	Solander	
Cook	Somerset	
Cook	Strathleven	
Cook	Strathmore	
Cook	Tate	
Cook	Torres	Torres Strait Islands
Cook	Victor	
Cook	Walsh	
Cook	Warner	
Cook	Weipa	
Cook	Weymouth	
Cook	Wrotham	
Cook	Yagoonya	
Cook	York	
Darling Downs	Aubigny	Toowoomba, Dalby
Darling Downs	Auburn	
Darling Downs	Bentinck	Stanthorpe
Darling Downs	Bulwer	Miles
Darling Downs	Carnarvon	
Darling Downs	Clive	Texas
Darling Downs	Derby	Millmerran
Darling Downs	Lytton	Chinchilla
Darling Downs	Marsh	Goondiwindi
Darling Downs	Merivale	Warwick
Darling Downs	Pring	
Darling Downs	Rogers	Condamine
Leichhardt	Aberdeen	
Leichhardt	Bauhinia	
Leichhardt	Cairns	
Leichhardt	Clermont	
Leichhardt	Consuelo	
Leichhardt	Dawson	
Leichhardt	Denison	
Leichhardt	Ferguson	
Leichhardt	Fortescue	
Leichhardt	Humboldt	
Leichhardt	Killarney	
Leichhardt	Kimberley	
Leichhardt	Labouchere	
Leichhardt	Leura	
Leichhardt	Plantagenet	
Leichhardt	Roper	
Leichhardt	Talbot	
Leichhardt	Tingarra	
Leichhardt	Westgrove	
Leichhardt	Wodehouse	
Leichhardt	Wooroora	
Maranoa	Belmore	
Maranoa	Bundara	
Maranoa	Cogoon	
Maranoa	Dublin	
Maranoa	Elgin	
Maranoa	Kennedy	
Maranoa	Maranoa	
Maranoa	Mungallala	
Maranoa	Nebine	
Maranoa	Tomoo	
Maranoa	Waldegrave	Roma
Maranoa	Warrong	
Mitchell	Barcoo	
Mitchell	Cassillis	
Mitchell	Cheviot	
Mitchell	Coorajah	
Mitchell	Coreena	
Mitchell	Cumberland	
Mitchell	Evora	
Mitchell	Fermoy	
Mitchell	Gayundah	
Mitchell	Maneroo	
Mitchell	Mexico	
Mitchell	Mitchell	
Mitchell	Musgrave	
Mitchell	Paluma	
Mitchell	Portland	Longreach
Mitchell	Rodney	Barcaldine, Aramac
Mitchell	Ruthven	
Mitchell	Tambo	
Mitchell	Towerhill	
Mitchell	Uanda	
Mitchell	Ularunda	
Mitchell	Vergemont	
Mitchell	Walker	
Mitchell	Warbreccan	
Mitchell	Windeyer	
Mitchell	Wolseley	
Mitchell	Wooroolah	
Mitchell	Woura	
Mitchell	Youranigh	
Moreton	Canning	Caboolture, Sunshine Coast
Moreton	Cavendish	Esk, Kingaroy
Moreton	Churchill	Gatton
Moreton	Stanley	Brisbane, Ipswich, Logan, Redcliffe
Moreton	Ward	Gold Coast
North Gregory	Amaroo	
North Gregory	Ayrshire	Winton
North Gregory	Binburie	
North Gregory	Brighton	
North Gregory	Buckingham	
North Gregory	Carrandotta	
North Gregory	Chatsworth	
North Gregory	Currawilla	
North Gregory	Diamantina	
North Gregory	Elderslie	
North Gregory	Eurinye	
North Gregory	Eyre	
North Gregory	Farrar	
North Gregory	Georgina	
North Gregory	Glengyle	
North Gregory	Hamilton	
North Gregory	Kynuna	
North Gregory	Malwa	
North Gregory	Manuka	
North Gregory	Mayne	
North Gregory	Merlin	
North Gregory	Monkira	
North Gregory	Mowarra	
North Gregory	Nyama	
North Gregory	Oondooroo	
North Gregory	Piturie	
North Gregory	Rosebrook	
North Gregory	Sandringham	
North Gregory	Sturt	
North Gregory	Toko	
North Gregory	Warburton	
North Gregory	Waverley	
North Gregory	Wills	
North Gregory	Windsor	
North Gregory	Wokingham	
North Gregory	Woodstock	
North Kennedy	Cardwell	Hinchinbrook Island
North Kennedy	Clarke	
North Kennedy	Dalrymple	
North Kennedy	Davenport	Charters Towers
North Kennedy	Elphinstone	Townsville
North Kennedy	Gladstone	
North Kennedy	Griffith	
North Kennedy	Gunnawarra	
North Kennedy	Herbert	Bowen, Whitsunday Islands
North Kennedy	Murray	
North Kennedy	O'Connell	
North Kennedy	Salisbury	
North Kennedy	Wairuna	
North Kennedy	Wilkie Gray	
Port Curtis	Clinton	Gladstone
Port Curtis	Deas Thompson	
Port Curtis	Flinders	
Port Curtis	Liebig	
Port Curtis	Livingstone	Rockhampton
Port Curtis	Murchison	
Port Curtis	Pakington	
Port Curtis	Palmerston	
Port Curtis	Pelham	
Port Curtis	Raglan	
South Gregory	Abbotsford	
South Gregory	Bulgroo	
South Gregory	Burarie	
South Gregory	Cameron	
South Gregory	Carruthers	
South Gregory	Conbar	
South Gregory	Cooper	
South Gregory	Curralle	
South Gregory	Daroo	
South Gregory	Durham	
South Gregory	Durrie	
South Gregory	Gordon	
South Gregory	Grey	
South Gregory	Haddon	
South Gregory	Kyabra	
South Gregory	Pender	
South Gregory	Rosebery	Birdsville
South Gregory	Tanbar	
South Gregory	Thunda	
South Gregory	Titheroo	
South Gregory	Weramo	
South Gregory	Weringa	
South Gregory	Wilson	
South Gregory	Windula	
South Kennedy	Albany	
South Kennedy	Beaufort	
South Kennedy	Bell	
South Kennedy	Belyando	
South Kennedy	Buckland	
South Kennedy	Carlisle	Mackay
South Kennedy	Chataway	
South Kennedy	Claude	
South Kennedy	Dickson	
South Kennedy	Drake	
South Kennedy	Drummond	
South Kennedy	Drury	
South Kennedy	Foxton	
South Kennedy	Grosvenor	
South Kennedy	Hillalong	
South Kennedy	Rutledge	
South Kennedy	Sellheim	
Warrego	Bando	
Warrego	Bulloo	
Warrego	Burenda	
Warrego	Burrandilla	
Warrego	Chesterton	
Warrego	Glanworth	
Warrego	Gowan	
Warrego	Humeburn	
Warrego	Kungie	
Warrego	Kyrunda	
Warrego	Langlo	
Warrego	McKinlay	
Warrego	Munga	
Warrego	Nickavilla	
Warrego	Nive	
Warrego	Noorama	
Warrego	Norley	
Warrego	Numalla	
Warrego	Orrery	Charleville
Warrego	Palmer	
Warrego	Paroo	
Warrego	Pitteroo	
Warrego	Ross	
Warrego	Titheroo	
Warrego	Wellington	Cunnamulla
Warrego	Wyara	
Wide Bay/Burnett	Boondooma	
Wide Bay/Burnett	Bowen	Gin Gin
Wide Bay/Burnett	Cook	Bundaberg
Wide Bay/Burnett	Fitzroy	Nanango
Wide Bay/Burnett	Fraser	Fraser Island
Wide Bay/Burnett	Lennox	Kilkivan
Wide Bay/Burnett	Mackenzie	Gayndah, Mundubbera
Wide Bay/Burnett	March	Gympie, Hervey Bay, Maryborough, Noosa
Wide Bay/Burnett	Newcastle	
Wide Bay/Burnett	Rawbelle	Monto
Wide Bay/Burnett	Wicklow	
Wide Bay/Burnett	Yarrol	Eidsvold

== List of counties and number of parishes ==
County	No. of Parishes
Abbotsford	17
Aberdeen	20
Albany	16
Albion	12
Allison	15
Amaroo	18
Archer	16
Argylla	13
Aubigny	46
Auburn	13
Ayrshire	15
Balurga	13
Bando	17
Banks	32
Barcoo	11
Bauhinia	17
Beaconsfield	20
Beaufort	15
Bell	16
Belmore	87
Belyando	13
Bentinck	22
Binburie	18
Bolwarra	15
Boondooma	15
Bowen	22
Brahe	10
Brighton	16
Buckingham	18
Buckland	8
Bulgroo	13
Buller	15
Bulloo	10
Bulwer	22
Bundara	18
Burarie	17
Burdekin	12
Burenda	15
Burke	24
Burrandilla	15
Byerley	10
Cairns	12
Cameron	16
Canning	14
Canobie	13
Cardwell	43
Carlisle	26
Carnarvon	25
Carpentaria	12
Carrandotta	21
Carruthers	15
Cassillis	11
Cavendish	22
Chataway	10
Chatsworth	19
Chelmsford	20
Chesterton	6
Cheviot	11
Chudleigh	16
Churchill	34
Clarke	17
Claude	6
Clermont	28
Clinton	29
Clive	17
Coen	18
Cogoon	16
Conbar	13
Consuelo	13
Cook	34
Cooper	13
Coorajah	13
Cootah	12
Copperfield	11
Coreena	15
Cumberland	33
Curralle	17
Currawilla	17
Dagmar	15
Dalrymple	13
Daroo	18
Davenport	22
Dawson	14
Deas Thompson	10
Denison	39
Derby	33
Diamantina	19
Dickson	14
Douglas	18
Drake	17
Drummond	9
Drury	16
Dublin	23
Dulhunty	13
Dunbar	13
Durham	16
Durrie	19
Dutton	15
Eddington	18
Einasleigh	10
Elderslie	10
Elgin	20
Elphinstone	21
Esmeralda	13
Etheridge	14
Eurinye	19
Evora	12
Eyre	21
Farrar	20
Ferguson	11
Fermoy	9
Fielding	13
Fitzroy	22
Flinders	16
Fortescue	28
Foxton	10
Franklin	12
Fraser	6
Gayundah	18
Georgina	14
Gilbert	14
Gladstone	17
Glanworth	13
Glengyle	20
Glenora	11
Gordon	12
Gould	14
Gowan	13
Granada	19
Gregory	17
Grey	17
Griffith	12
Grosvenor	12
Gunnawarra	16
Haddon	15
Hamilton	20
Hann	17
Herbert	28
Hillalong	10
Hodgkinson	14
Howitt	13
Humboldt	19
Humeburn	15
Iffley	18
Jardine	13
Kalkah	13
Kamileroi	15
Kendall	13
Kennedy	12
Killarney	12
Kimberley	14
King	11
Koolatah	12
Kungie	18
Kyabra	16
Kynuna	14
Kyrunda	14
Labouchere	18
Lamington	15
Landsborough	14
Lang	13
Langlo	18
Lennox	27
Leura	14
Liebig	9
Livingstone	33
Lukin	15
Lynd	19
Lyndhurst	8
Lytton	20
Mackenzie	21
Malwa	19
Maneroo	12
Manfred	14
Manuka	13
Maramie	19
Maranoa	15
March	37
Marga	13
Marsh	22
Mayne	10
Mckinlay	17
Melville	14
Merivale	28
Merlin	11
Mexico	13
Mitchell	18
Monkira	19
Morstone	15
Mosman	19
Mowarra	16
Mueller	13
Munga	10
Mungallala	11
Murchison	15
Murray	11
Musgrave	19
Nares	26
Nash	14
Nebine	13
Newcastle	23
Nicholson	13
Nickavilla	13
Nive	11
Noorama	12
Norley	14
Norman	25
Numalla	15
Nyama	16
Oaklands	16
O'connell	18
Oondooroo	11
Orrery	17
Pakington	15
Palmer	24
Palmerston	15
Paluma	16
Parker	13
Paroo	17
Pelham	10
Pender	16
Pera	12
Percy	11
Philp	18
Pitteroo	15
Piturie	18
Plantagenet	19
Porchester	13
Portland	16
Pring	22
Raglan	17
Rawbelle	18
Richmond	12
Rochedale	20
Rodney	18
Rogers	21
Roper	8
Rosebery	16
Rosebrook	8
Ross	12
Rupert	12
Ruthven	13
Rutledge	11
Salisbury	18
Sandringham	16
Savannah	17
Saxby	10
Sellheim	23
Selwyn	17
Shelburne	13
Sidmouth	13
Solander	16
Somerset	11
Stanley	49
Stokes	8
Strathleven	17
Strathmore	12
Sturt	20
Surrey	11
Talawanta	16
Talbot	18
Taldora	15
Tambo	23
Tanbar	15
Tate	15
Tewinga	15
Thunda	16
Tingarra	10
Titheroo	12
Toko	16
Tomoo	14
Toorak	11
Torres	7
Tower Hill	14
Uanda	20
Ularunda	13
Undilla	15
Vergemont	11
Victor	12
Wairuna	15
Waldegrave	51
Walker	9
Walsh	11
Warbreccan	14
Warburton	17
Ward	37
Warner	13
Warrong	9
Waverley	19
Weipa	13
Wellesley	6
Wellington	41
Wentworth	15
Weramo	20
Weringa	14
Westgrove	14
Weymouth	16
Wicklow	12
Wilkie Gray	16
Wills	18
Wilson	10
Windeyer	7
Windsor	16
Windula	16
Wodehouse	18
Wokingham	8
Wolseley	16
Wondoola	11
Wongalee	17
Wonomo	15
Woodstock	11
Woolgar	19
Wooroolah	11
Wooroona	17
Woura	12
Wrotham	9
Wyara	16
Yagoonya	22
Yappar	12
Yarrol	18
York	15
Youranigh	16
