= Plantagenet County =

Plantagenet County may refer to places in Australia:

- Plantagenet County, Western Australia
- Plantagenet County, Queensland
