= Wyarra County, Queensland =

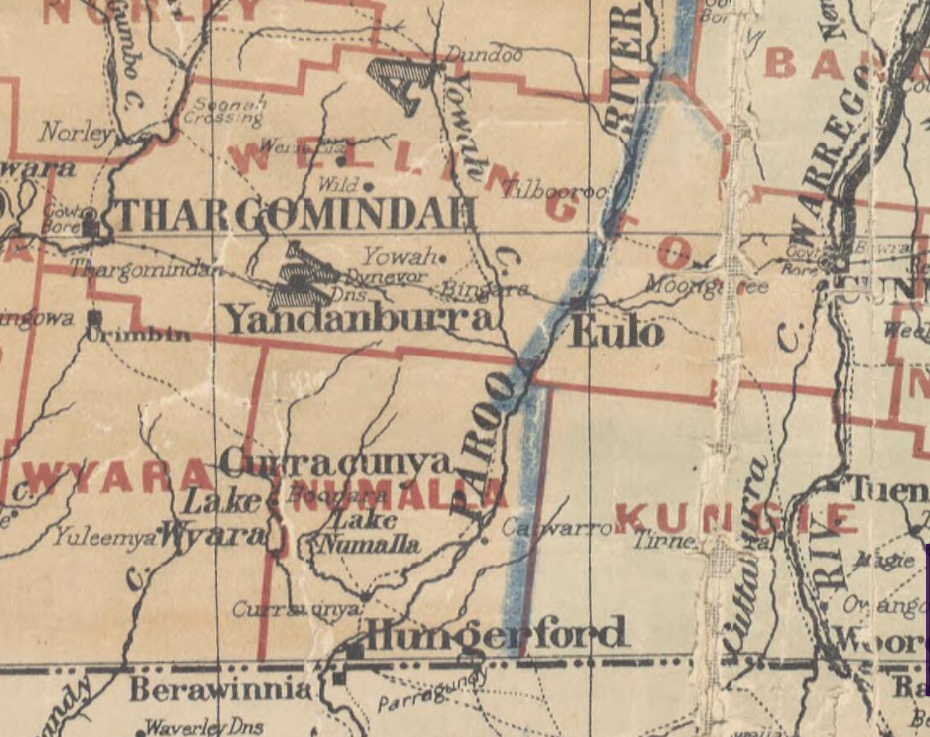
Wellington County Queensland 1900.

Wyarra County is a cadastral division of Queensland, Australia and a county of the Warrego Land District of remote western Queensland.

The county came into existence on 8 March 1901, when the Governor of Queensland issued a proclamation legally dividing Queensland into counties under the Land Act 1897. At this point Wyarra County was taken off Wellington County to form the current County.

The entirety of the County is incorporated land with the seat of local government at Thargomindah, Queensland.

Like all counties in Queensland, it is a non-functional administrative unit, that is used mainly for the purpose of registering land titles. From 30 November 2015, the government no longer referenced counties and parishes in land information systems. However the Museum of Lands, Mapping and Surveying retains a record for historical purposes.
