= McKinlay County, Queensland =

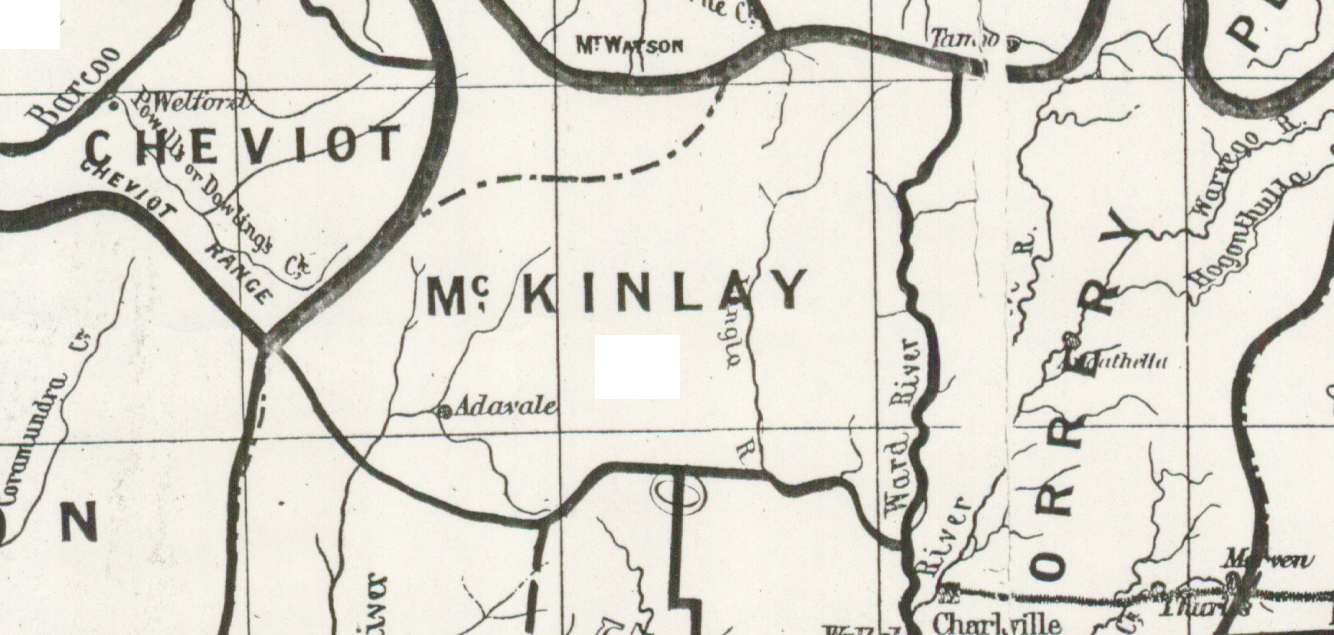
Map of McKinley County Queensland, in 1890, by Surveyor General Office, Brisbane

McKinlay County is a cadastral division of Queensland and a county of the Warrego Land District of south western Queensland.

== History ==
The county came into existence in the 19th century but achieved its current form on 8 March 1901, when the Governor of Queensland issued a proclamation legally dividing Queensland into counties under the Land Act 1897. Like all counties in Queensland, it is a non-functional administrative unit, that is used mainly for the purpose of registering land titles. From 30 November 2015, the government no longer referenced counties and parishes in land information systems however the Museum of Lands, Mapping and Surveying retains a record for historical purposes.

The center of local government for the County used to be Adavale, Queensland but in July 1930, this was transferred to Quilpie, Queensland which is in the adjoining County of Nickavilla County. The postal code is 4481.

The county is divided into civil parishes.
