= Kyrunda County, Queensland =

Kyrunda County is a cadastral division of Warrego Land District of Southern Queensland and a County of Queensland, Australia.

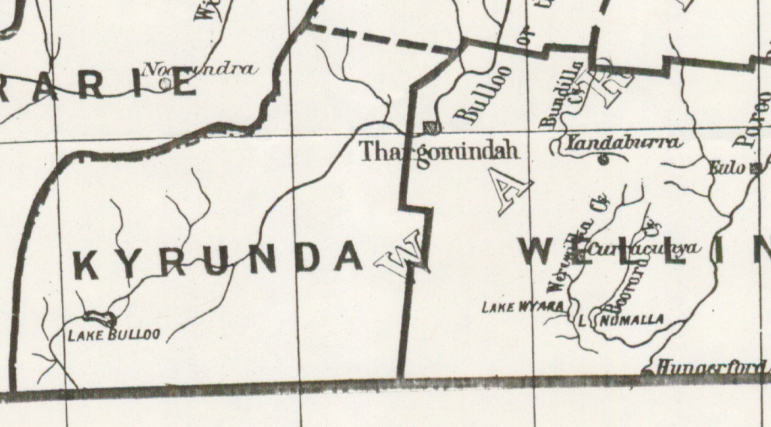
Kyrunda County Queensland

The county dates from the late 19th century but has been in its current form since 8 March 1901, when the Governor of Queensland issued a proclamation legally dividing all of Queensland into counties under the Land Act 1897. At this point the southern portion of the County was taken off to form Titheroo County.

Like all counties in Queensland, it is a non-functional administrative unit, that is used mainly for the purpose of registering land titles. From 30 November 2015, the government no longer referenced counties and parishes in land information systems, however the Museum of Lands, Mapping and Surveying retains a record for historical purposes.

== Geography ==
The County is located at 28° 04' 00" S / 143° 17' 00" E. and is part of the Channel Country, a flat, arid area of broad acre agriculture located in the Queensland Outback.

The center of local government is Thargomindah, approximately 1,000 kilometres (620 mi) west of the state capital, Brisbane.
