= Roseberry County =

Roseberry County may refer to:

- Roseberry County, Northern Territory, Australia
- Roseberry County, Queensland, Australia
