= Paroo County, Queensland =

County of Paroo Queensland
- Coordinates: 26.7833°S 145.0666°E

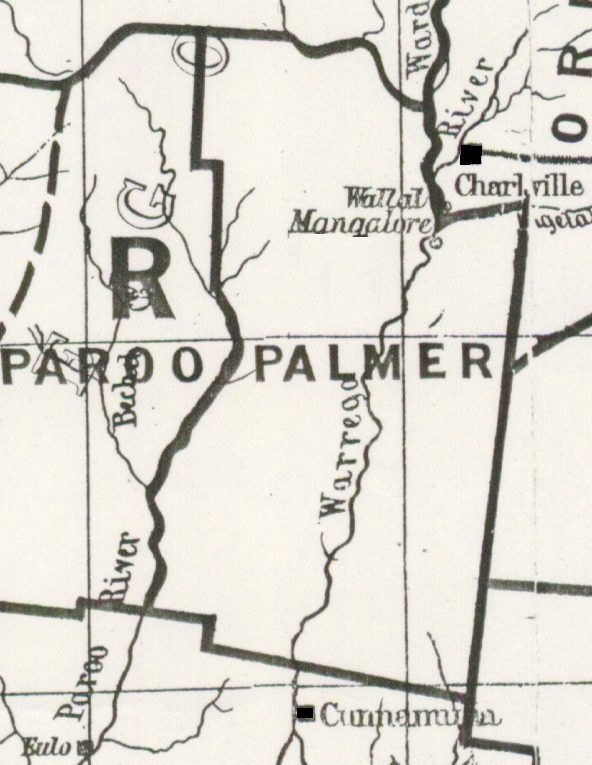
Palmer County in Queensland in 1890.

Paroo County is a cadastral division of Queensland and a county of the Warrego Land District of southwestern Queensland.

The county came into existence in the 19th century, but on 8 March 1901, when the Governor of Queensland issued a proclamation legally dividing Queensland into counties under the Land Act 1897.

Like all counties in Queensland, it is a non-functional administrative unit, that is used mainly for the purpose of registering land titles. From 30 November 2015, the government no longer referenced counties and parishes in land information systems however the Museum of Lands, Mapping and Surveying retains a record for historical purposes.

The county was the traditional lands of the Margany and Gunggari peoples peoples. European settlement began in the 1870s.

== Climate ==
The County has a hot semi-arid climate (Köppen BSh), very closely bordering on a hot arid climate (BWh), which is found in the western part of the shire. Summers are sweltering and generally dry except when monsoonal incursions into the continent bring heavy rain, whilst winters are warm and dry with cool to cold mornings.
