= Cameron County, Queensland =

County of Queensland in Australia

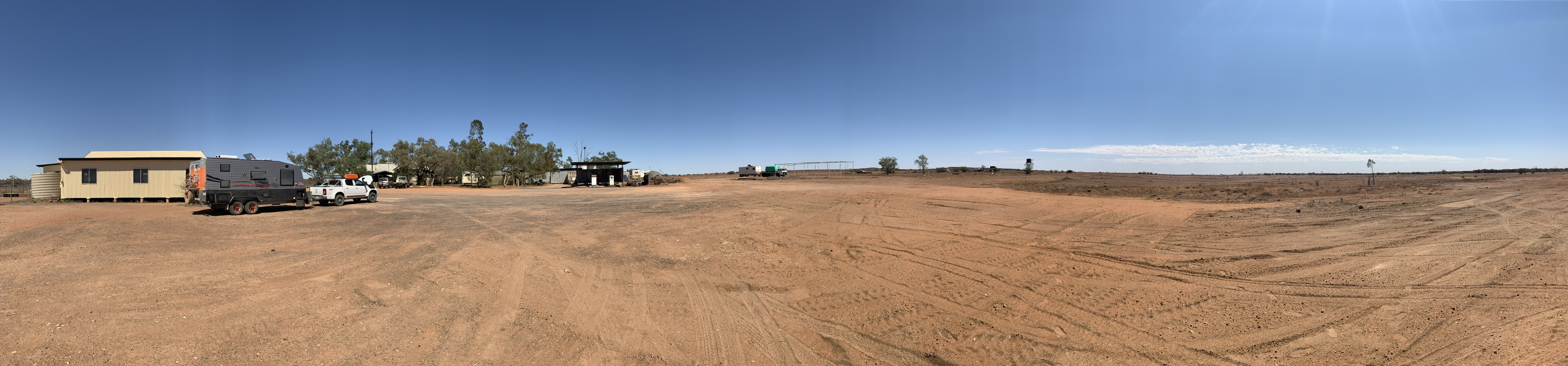
Landscape photo of Cameron County area taken 2019

Cameron County, Queensland is a County of Queensland in Australia, in the South Gregory District Land District.

The entirety of the County is incorporated in the Shire of Bulloo with the seat of local government being located at Thargomindah. The County is remote, arid and flat like much of the channel country. The county is divided into civil parishes.

== History ==
Prior to colonisation the area the County now lies on was traditional land of the Karnic tribes. The county came into existence in the 19th century, but on 8 March 1901, when the Governor of Queensland issued a proclamation legally dividing Queensland into counties under the Land Act 1897.

Like all counties in Queensland, it is a non-functional administrative unit, that is used mainly for the purpose of registering land titles. From 30 November 2015, the government no longer referenced counties and parishes in land information systems however the Museum of Lands, Mapping and Surveying retains a record for historical purposes.
