= County of Toko, Queensland =

Coordinates: 22.8646°S 138.5614°E

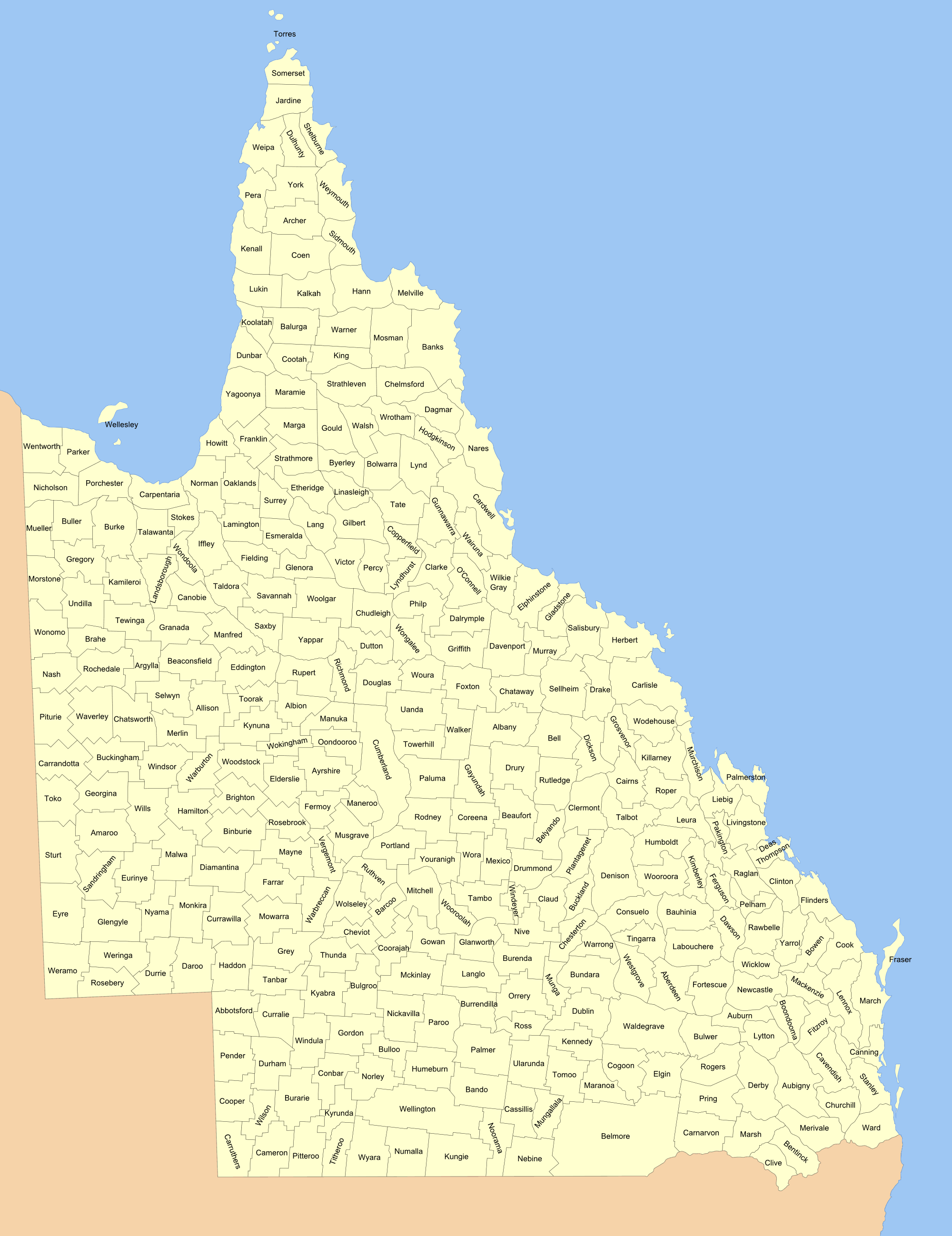
The 319 counties of Queensland in 1901.

Toko County is one of the 318 counties of Queensland in Australia. It is within the North Gregory District of western Queensland. The county is divided into civil parishes. The county is on the Queensland - Northern Territory Border.

== History ==
The county was created in 1901.

The first White people to pass through the area were the Burke and Wills expedition in 1860, and the rescue expeditions that followed.

Today the predominant land use is grazing on native vegetation. though the county is largely uninhabited.

The county is located in the Channel Country, close to the Tropic of Capricorn and the seat of local government is at Boulia.

== See also ==
- Toko, Queensland
