= County of Maramie =

Coordinates: 15°43′44″S 142°40′06″E

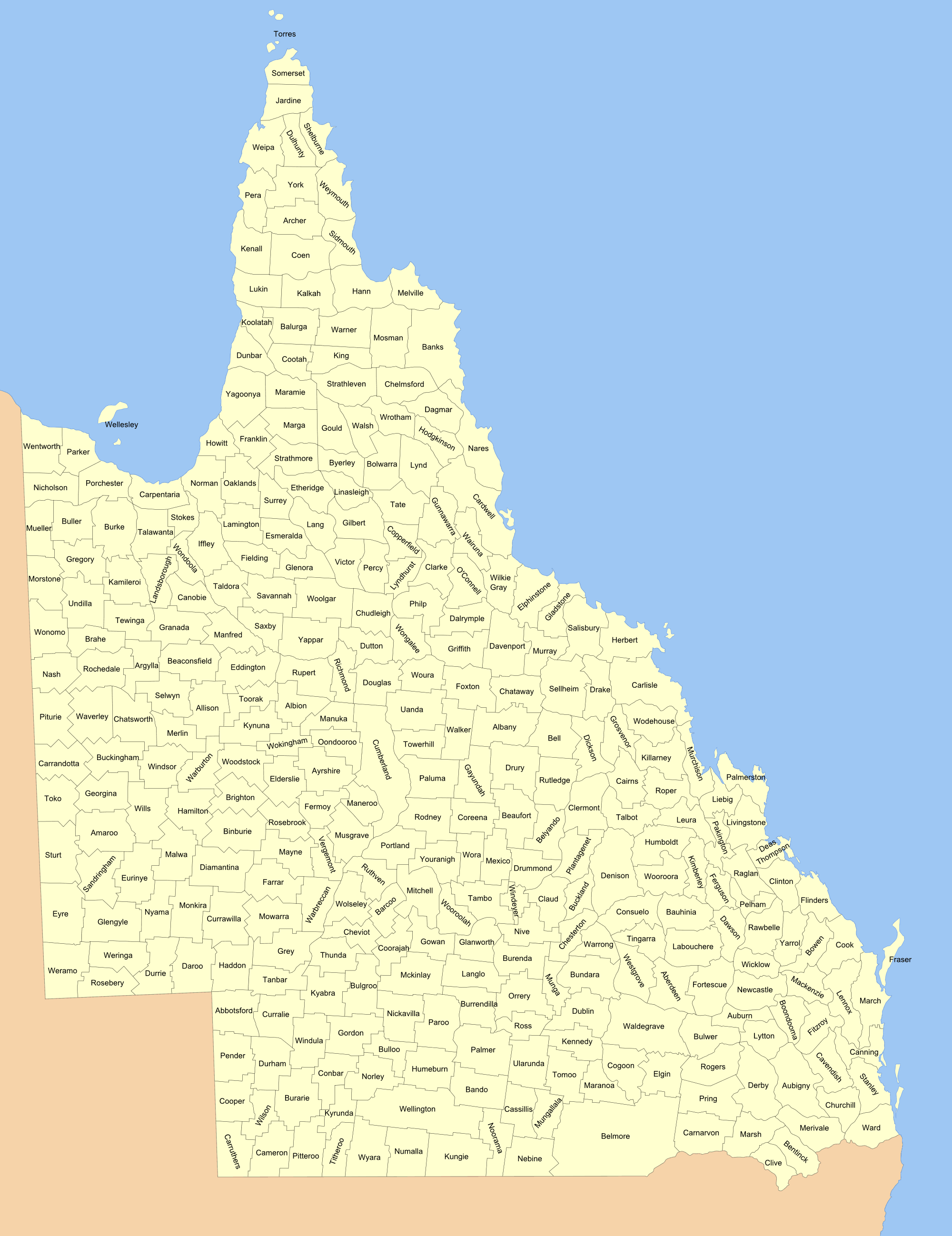
The 319 counties of Queensland in 1901.

Maramie County is one of the counties of Queensland, Australia, that existed before 1901. Named for a local variety of crayfish, the county is located in Far North Queensland on the lower Cape York Peninsula, about 130 kilometres (81 mi) south-east of Kowanyama.

The county is divided into civil  parishes.
