= Dalrymple County, Queensland =

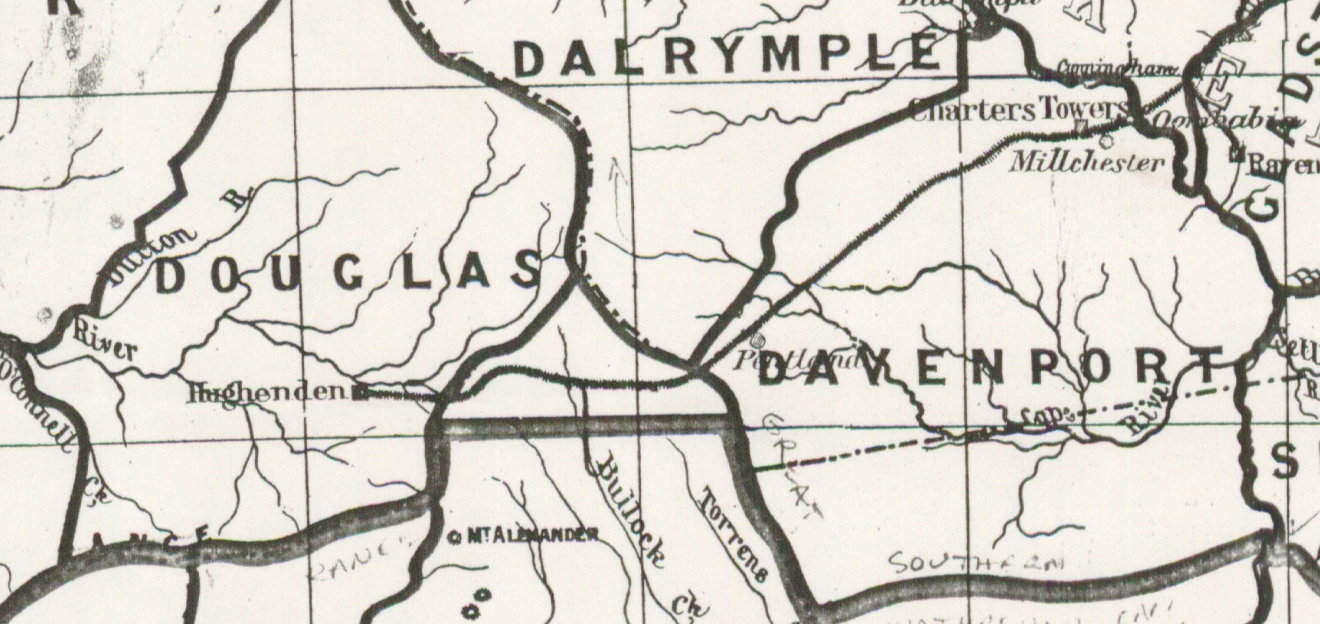
Dalrymple County Queensland 1890

Dalrymple County is one of the 318 counties of Queensland, Australia. The county came into existence in the 19th century, and on 8 March 1901, the Governor of Queensland issued a proclamation legally dividing Queensland into counties under the Land Act 1897. Like all counties in Queensland, it is a non-functional administrative unit, that is used mainly for the purpose of registering land titles. From 30 November 2015, the government no longer referenced counties and parishes in land information systems however the Museum of Lands, Mapping and Surveying retains a record for historical purposes.

The entire county is incorporated, with the seat of local government in Charters Towers, Queensland

== Climate ==
The county has a hot semi-arid climate (Köppen climate classification: BSh), with distinct seasons. Summers are hot and often rainy, whereas winters are mild and dry with low humidity.

== See also ==
- Charters Towers Courthouse
