= County of Weymouth =

Coordinates: 13.1333°S 143.1667°E

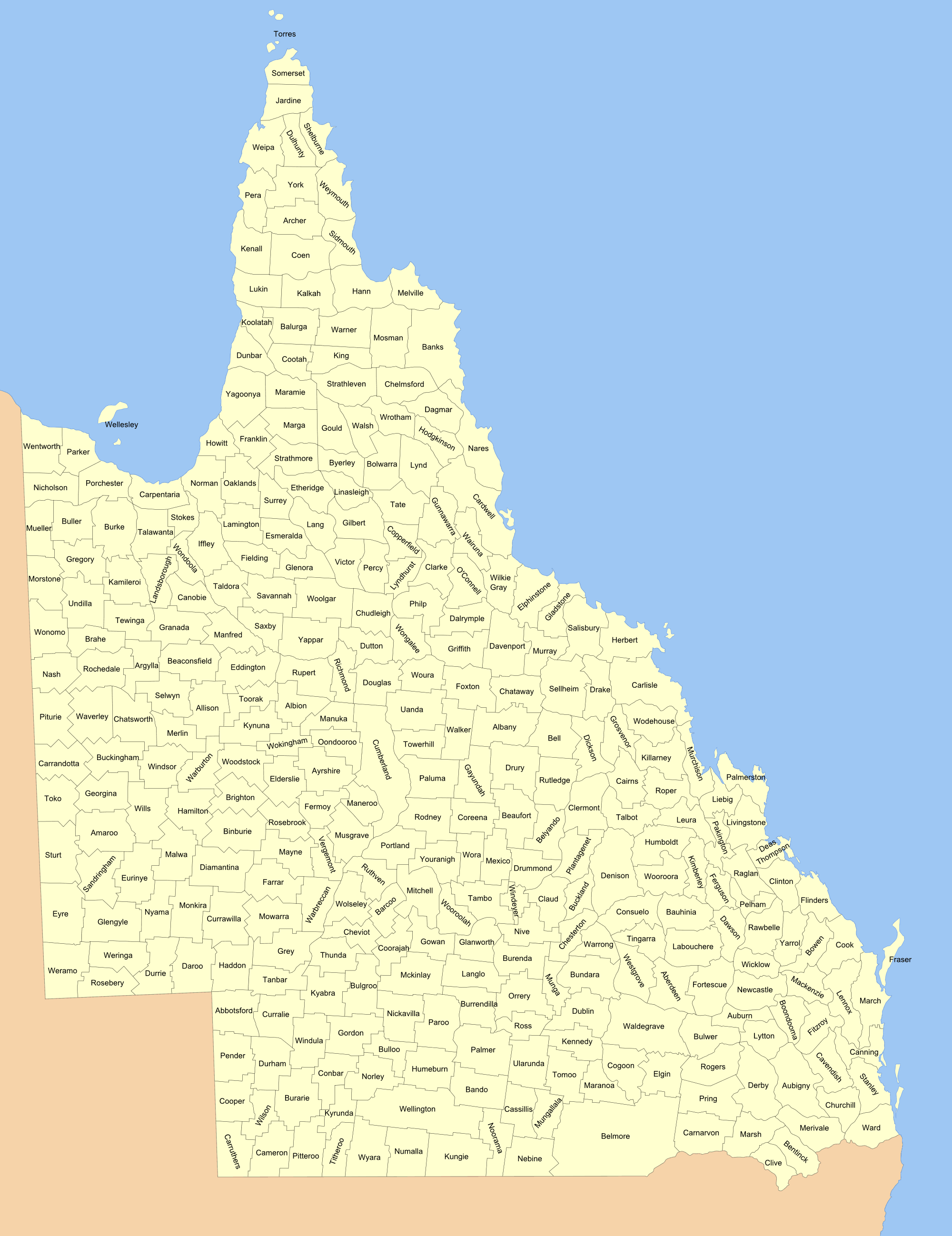
Queensland cadastral divisions

Weymouth County is one of the 318 counties of Queensland, Australia. The county is centered on Weymouth Bay, Cape York Peninsula within the Cook Land District. The county is divided into civil parishes.

The county was split off from York County in 1901 (124 years ago).
