= Wellington County, Queensland =

Wellington County is a cadastral division of Queensland and a county of remote western Queensland.

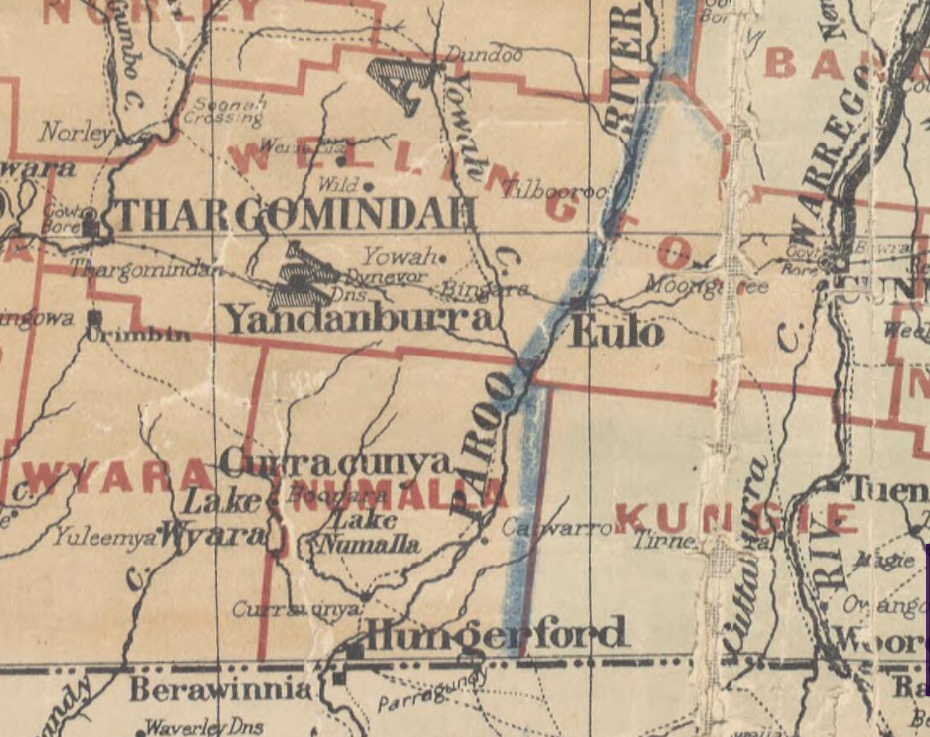
Wellington County Queensland. Survey Office Brisbane 1900.

The county came into existence in the 19th century, but reached its current size on 8 March 1901, when the Governor of Queensland issued a proclamation legally dividing Queensland into counties under the Land Act 1897. At this point parts were taken off Wellington County to form the current adjoining Counties.

The entirety of the County is incorporated land with the seat of local government at Cunnamulla, Queensland. The county is divided into civil parishes.

Like all counties in Queensland, it is a non-functional administrative unit, that is used mainly for the purpose of registering land titles. From 30 November 2015, the government no longer referenced counties and parishes in land information systems however the Museum of Lands, Mapping and Surveying retains a record for historical purposes.
