= Yappar County, Queensland =

Yappar County, Queensland is a cadastral division of Burke District of northern Queensland and a County of Queensland, Australia.

The county dates from the March 1901, when the Governor of Queensland issued a proclamation legally dividing all of Queensland into counties under the Land Act 1897. Like all counties in Queensland, it is a non-functional administrative unit, that is used mainly for the purpose of registering land titles. From 30 November 2015, the government no longer referenced counties and parishes in land information systems however the Museum of Lands, Mapping and Surveying retains a record for historical purposes.

The entire county is incorporated and divided into parishes.

== See also ==
- Yappar River
