= County of Rochedale =

Rochedale Queensland
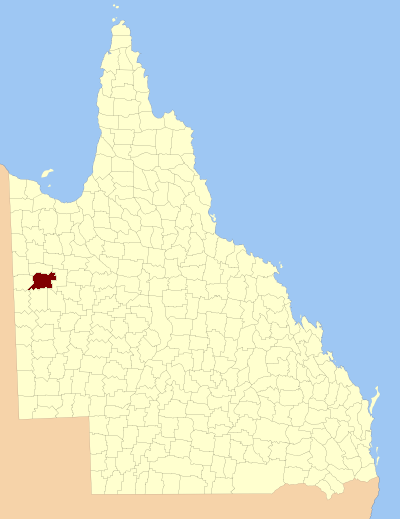
- Location within Queensland
Lands administrative divisions around Rochedale:
Brahe	Brahe	Argylla
Nash	Rochedale	Argylla
Piturie	Waverley	Chatsworth

The County of Rochedale is a county (a cadastral division) in Queensland, Australia. The county is divided into civil parishes. It is centred on the city of Mount Isa, its only population centre. On 7 March 1901, the Governor issued a proclamation legally dividing Queensland into counties under the Land Act 1897. Its schedule described Rochedale thus:

Bounded on the north by the county of Brahe and parts of the west and south of Glenvale No. 2 Block to the Leichhardt River, by that river upwards to the north-west corner of Parkside No. 1, by the north, east and south boundaries of that block, part of the south and east boundaries of Parkside No. 2, part of the north, the east, and south boundaries of Parkside No. 5, and the east boundary of Parkside No. 8 Block; on the south by the counties of Chapworth, Waverley and Piturie; and on the west by the county of Nash.

== Parishes ==
Parish	LGA	Coordinates	Towns
Bright	Mount Isa	20°45′S 139°02′E	
Burnley	Mount Isa	20°24′S 139°05′E	
Chad	Mount Isa	20°57′S 138°44′E	
Deardean	Mount Isa	20°36′S 138°53′E	
Haslingden	Mount Isa	20°39′S 139°34′E	Mount Isa
Hebden	Mount Isa	20°39′S 139°05′E	
Heywood	Mount Isa	20°51′S 139°31′E	Healy
Holmfirth	Mount Isa	20°30′S 139°25′E	
Meltham	Mount Isa	20°32′S 139°05′E	
Mitholm	Mount Isa	20°26′S 138°55′E	
Norden	Mount Isa	20°41′S 139°24′E	Mount Isa West
Parkside	Mount Isa	20°34′S 139°43′E	
Prestbury	Mount Isa	20°27′S 139°16′E	
Prestwich	Mount Isa	20°51′S 139°14′E	
Recedam	Mount Isa	20°53′S 138°51′E	
Rishworth	Mount Isa	20°53′S 139°05′E	
Royds	Mount Isa	20°50′S 138°58′E	
Royton	Mount Isa	20°50′S 139°22′E	
Sowerby	Mount Isa	20°39′S 139°15′E	
Whitworth	Mount Isa	20°25′S 139°38′E	
