= Douglas County, Queensland =

County of Queensland, Australia

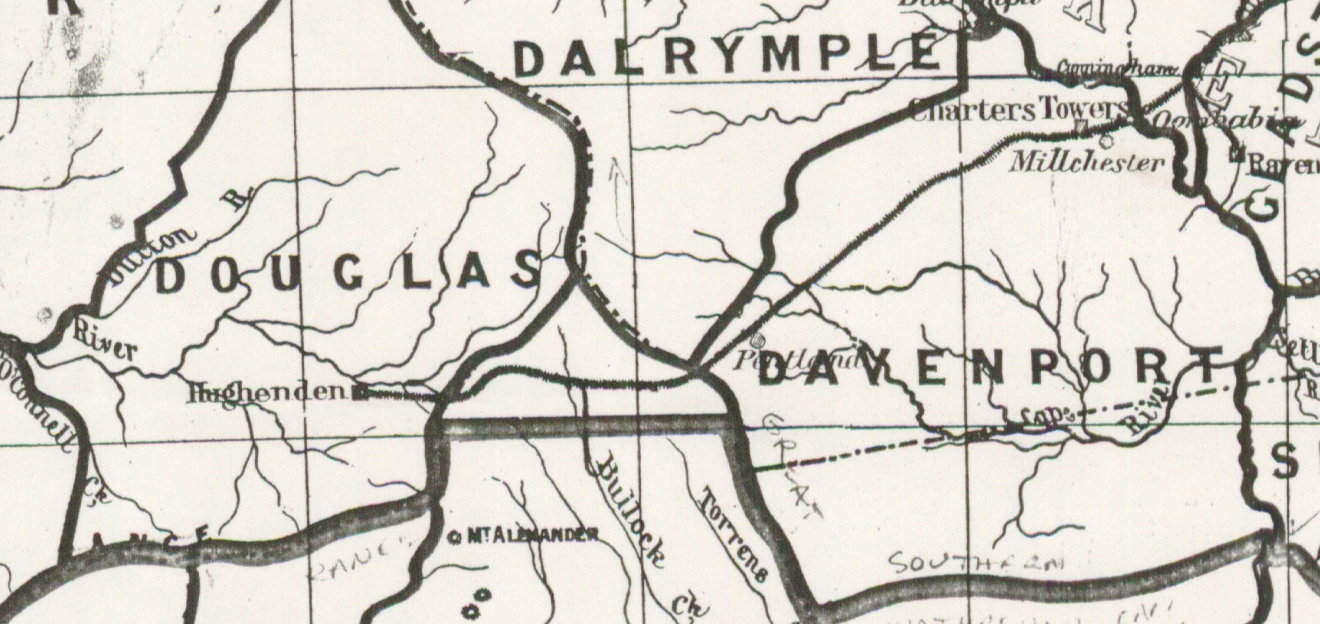
Douglas County Queensland 1890

Douglas County is one of the 318 counties of Queensland, Australia. The county is divided into civil parishes. The county came into existence in the 19th century, and on 8 March 1901, the Governor of Queensland issued a proclamation legally dividing Queensland into counties under the Land Act 1897. Like all counties in Queensland, it is a non-functional administrative unit, that is used mainly for the purpose of registering land titles. From 30 November 2015, the government no longer referenced counties and parishes in land information systems however the Museum of Lands, Mapping and Surveying retains a record for historical purposes.

The county is the traditional lands of the Yirandhali peoples. Europeans first arrived in the area in the 1860s and today Hughenden, Queensland is the largest town. This town is a stop on The Inlander Railway.
