= Sturt County, Queensland =

County of queensland

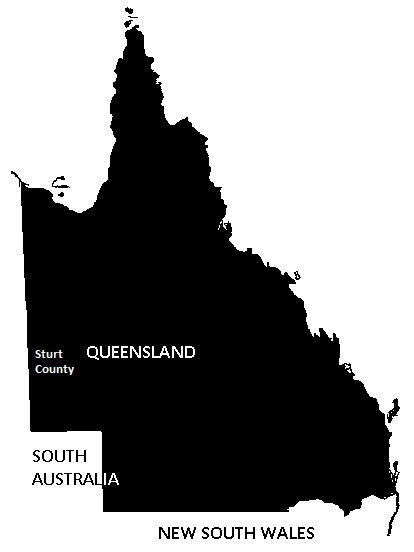
Sturt County, Queensland

Sturt County is a cadastral division of North Gregory District of Western Queensland and a County of Queensland, Australia.

Like all counties in Queensland, it is a non-functional administrative unit, that is used mainly for the purpose of registering land titles.

The county dates from colonial times but the current iteration dates from the 8th March 1901, when the Governor of Queensland issued a proclamation legally dividing all of Queensland into counties under the Land Act 1897.

Like all counties in Queensland, it is a non-functional administrative unit, that is used mainly for the purpose of registering land titles. From 30 November 2015, the government no longer referenced counties and parishes in land information systems however the Museum of Lands, Mapping and Surveying retains a record for historical purposes.

The entire County is incorporated lands.
