= Grey County, Queensland =

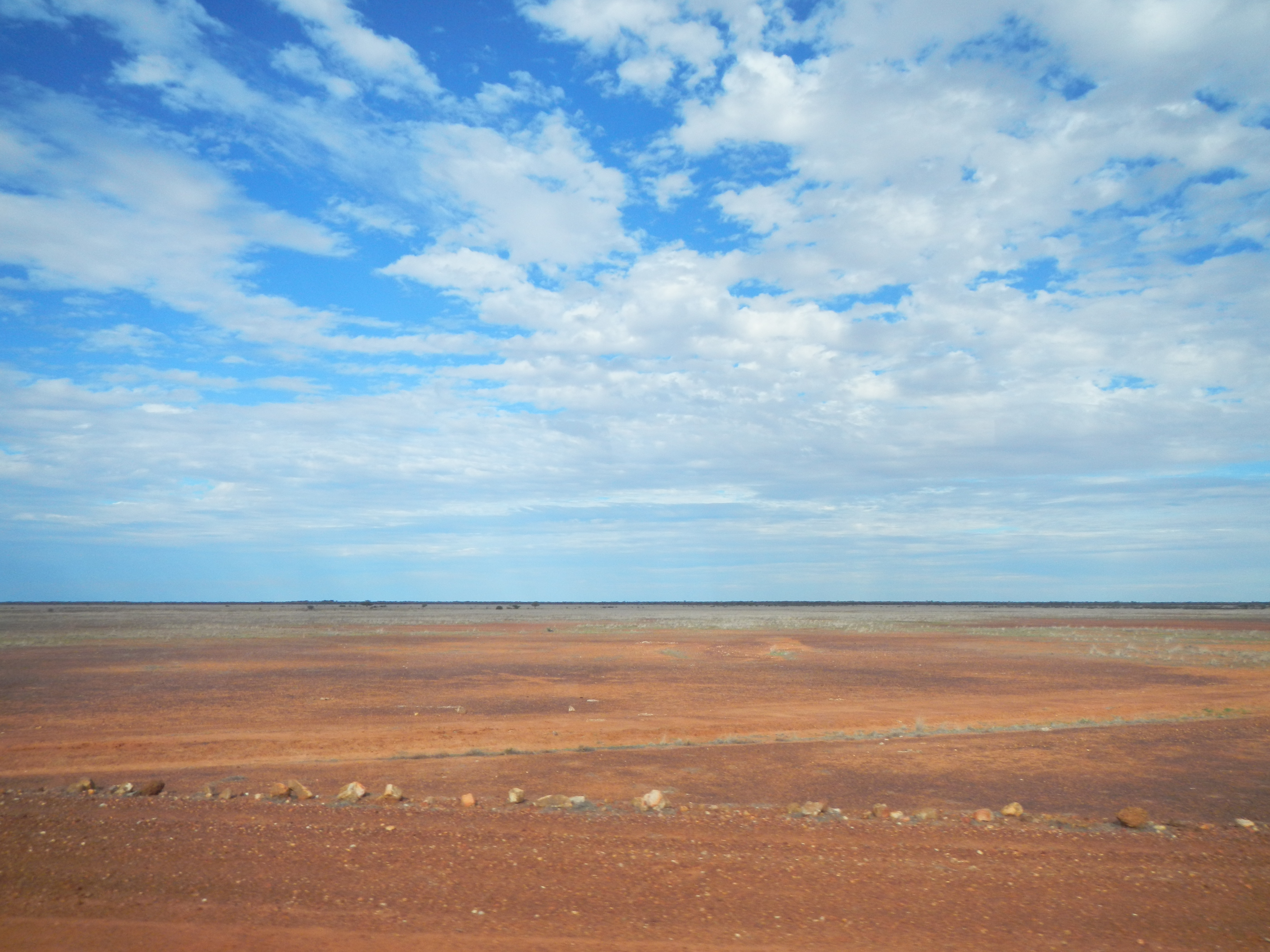
Grey county North_of_Windorah

Grey County is a cadastral division of Queensland and a county of the South Gregory District of remote western Queensland. The county is divided into civil parishes.

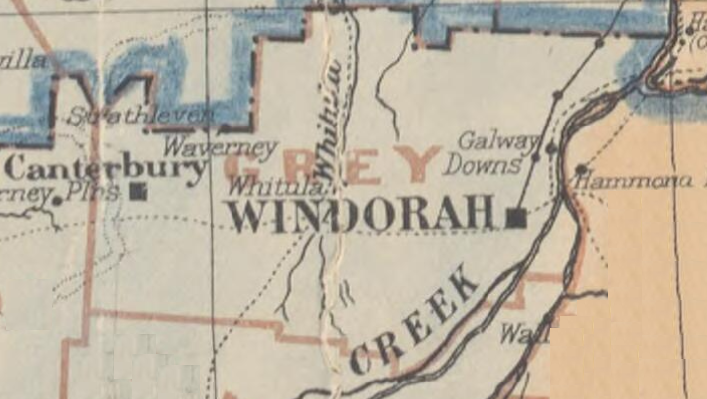
File:Grey county queensland

The county came into existence in the 19th century, but on 8 March 1901, when the Governor of Queensland issued a proclamation legally dividing Queensland into counties under the Land Act 1897.

Like all counties in Queensland, it is a non-functional administrative unit, that is used mainly for the purpose of registering land titles. From 30 November 2015, the government no longer referenced counties and parishes in land information systems however the Museum of Lands, Mapping and Surveying retains a record for historical purposes.

== Climate ==
The temperature may range from maximums in summer that approach 50 °C to minimums in winter that are below 0 °C. The annual rainfall has recorded falls between a low of 86 mm and a high of 988 mm.
