= Cooper County, Queensland =

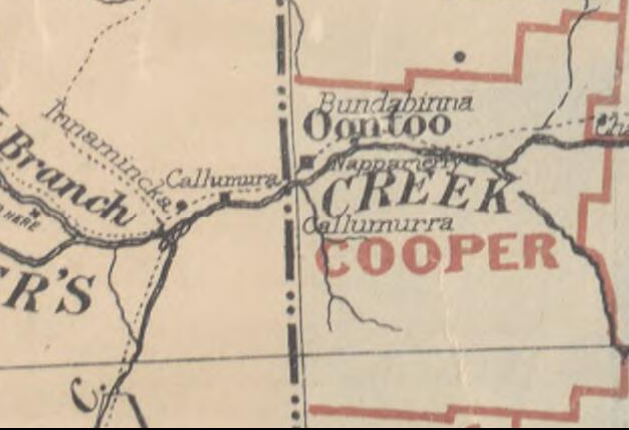
cooper county

Cooper County is a cadastral division of Queensland and a county of the South Gregory District of remote western Queensland. The county is divided into civil parishes.

The county came into existence in the 19th century, but on 8 March 1901, when the Governor of Queensland issued a proclamation legally dividing Queensland into counties under the Land Act 1897.

Like all counties in Queensland, it is a non-functional administrative unit, that is used mainly for the purpose of registering land titles. From 30 November 2015, the government no longer referenced counties and parishes in land information systems however the Museum of Lands, Mapping and Surveying retains a record for historical purposes.
