= Weramo County, Queensland =

County of Queensland, Australia

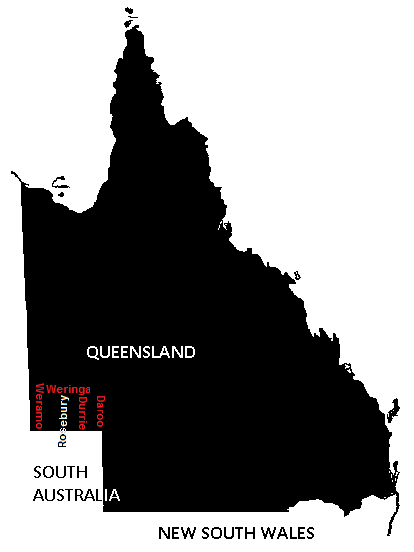
Rosebury County Queensland.

Weramo County Queensland is a cadastral division of Warrego Land District of western Queensland aa locality and a County of Queensland, Australia. Weramo County is in the arid centre of the continent.

== History ==
The county dates from the 8th March 1901, when the Governor of Queensland issued a proclamation legally dividing all of Queensland into counties under the Land Act 1897.

== Status ==
Like all counties in Queensland, it is a non-functional administrative unit, that is used mainly for the purpose of registering land titles. From 30 November 2015, the government no longer referenced counties and parishes in land information systems however the Museum of Lands, Mapping and Surveying retains a record for historical purposes.

The entire County is incorporated lands.

== Climate ==
The county has a hot desert climate (BWh in the Köppen climate classification) with an average of only 22 days of rain a year. Summers are extremely hot and dry, with winters being mild to warm. The median annual rainfall for the area is 133 mm (5.2 in) The actual amount of rain which falls is highly variable, for example, in 1914 just 14 mm (0.55 in) was recorded while 659 mm (25.9 in) fell in 1917. Dust storms are most likely during periods of strong wind which typically occur in spring. Birdsville has recorded the highest confirmed temperature in the state of Queensland, with 49.5 °C (121.1 °F) having been recorded on more than one occasion.
