= County of Balurga =

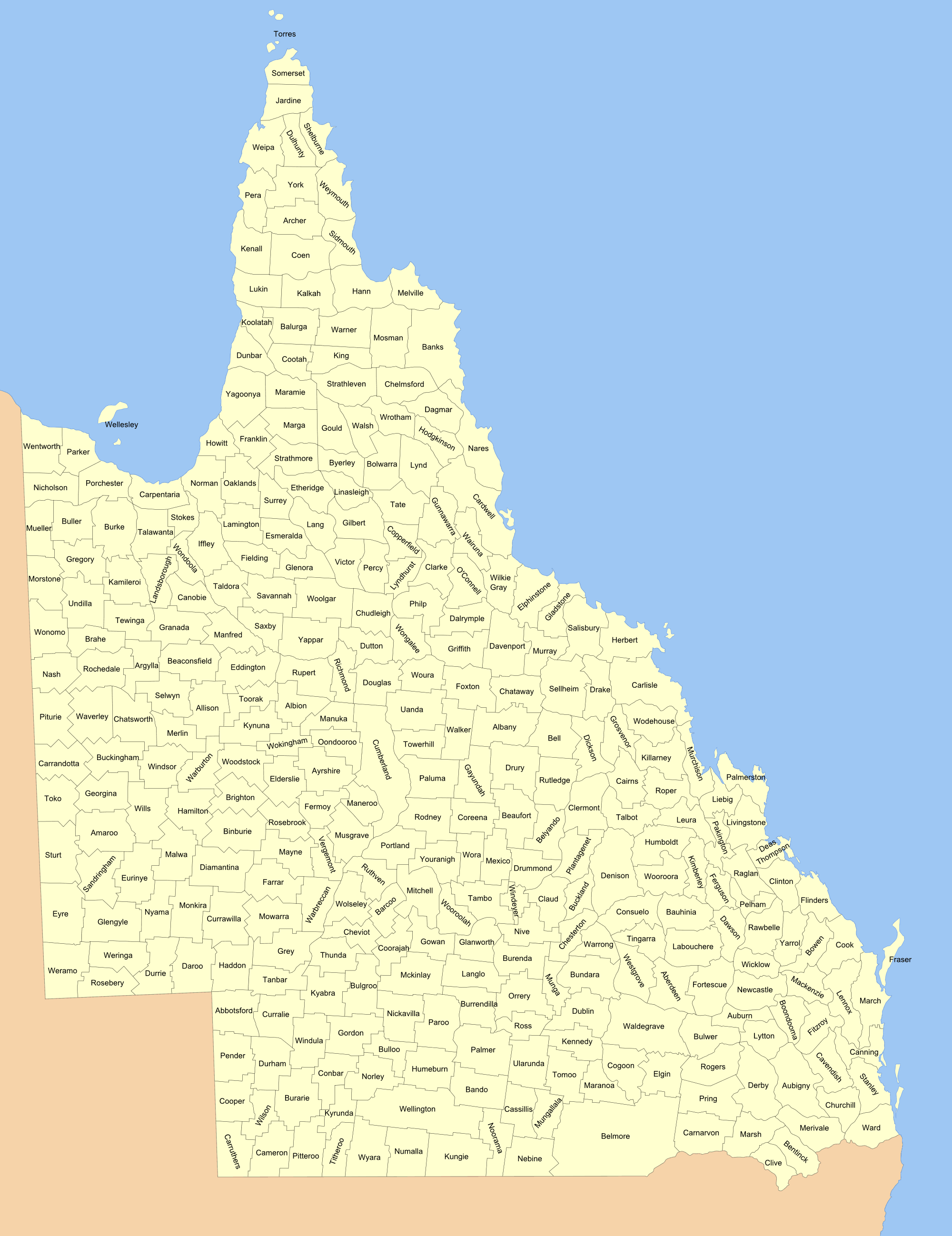
The 319 counties of Queensland in 1901.

The County of Balurga is a county (a cadastral division) in Queensland, Australia. It is located in Far North Queensland, east of Kowanyama on the Cape York Peninsula. On 7 March 1901, the Governor issued a proclamation legally dividing Queensland into counties under the Land Act 1897. Its schedule described Balurga thus:

Bounded on the north by the counties of Kalkah and Lukin; on the west by the county of Koolatah; on the south by the south boundaries of Koolatah, Koolatah No. 4, Koolatah No. 7, Cootah No. 2 and Cootah No. 3 Blocks; and on the east by the east boundaries of Cootah No. 3, Cootah No. 1, Goathland No.3 and Goathland No. 9.

== Parishes ==
The county is divided into civil parishes.

Parish	LGA	Coordinates
Balurga	Cook	14°55′S 142°15′E
Cloughton	Cook	15°04′S 142°24′E
Coleman	Cook	14°55′S 142°28′E
Goathland	Cook	15°06′S 142°40′E
Greenhow	Cook	15°07′S 142°54′E
Harkness	Cook	15°14′S 142°38′E
Helmsley	Cook	15°24′S 142°51′E
Ingleby	Cook	14°59′S 142°55′E
Levisham	Cook	15°12′S 142°22′E
Mungarda	Cook	14°56′S 142°41′E
Sefton	Cook	15°21′S 142°20′E
Snainton	Cook	15°16′S 142°53′E
Wykeham	Cook	15°23′S 142°35′E
