= Haddon County, Queensland =

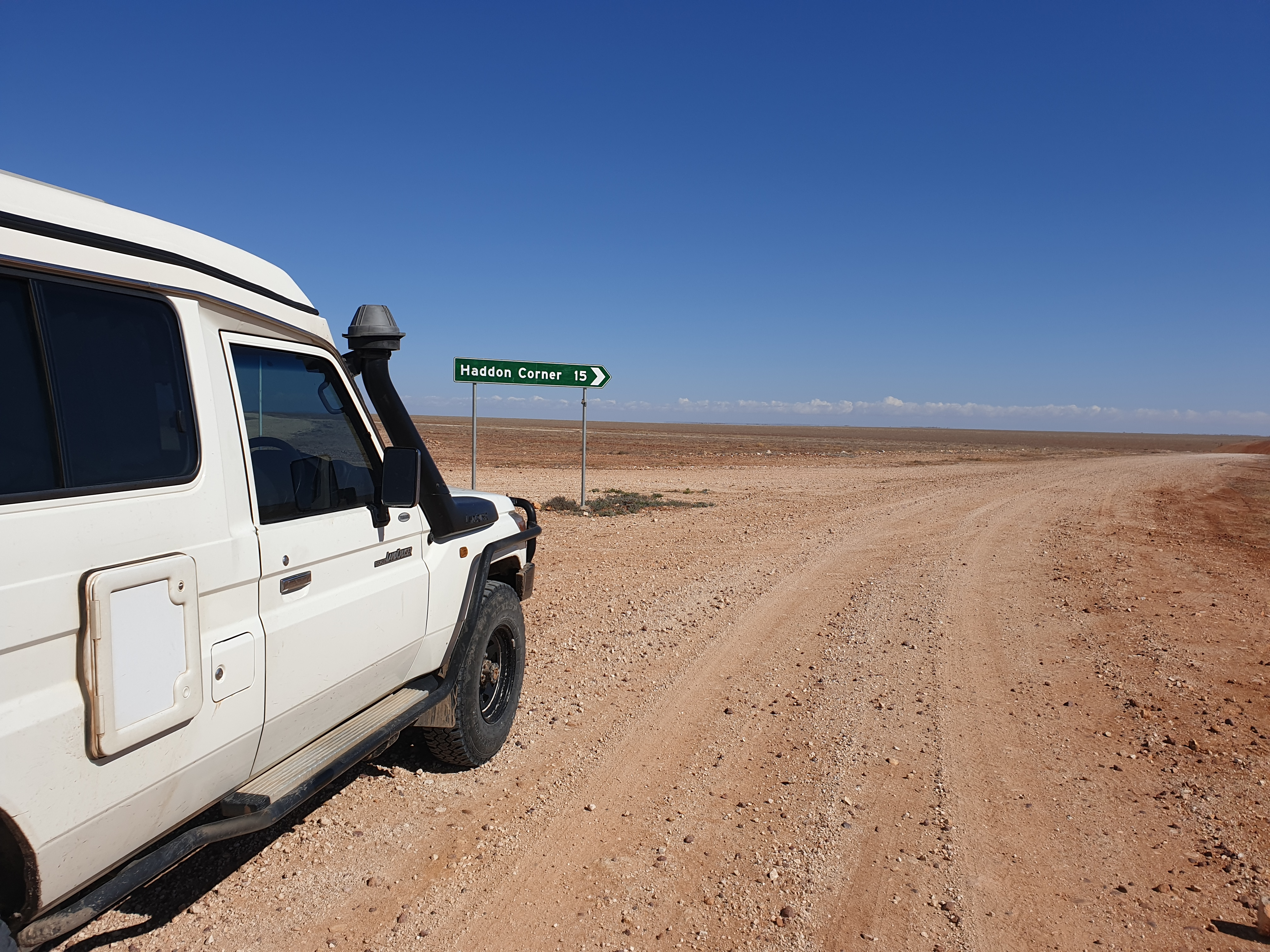
country in Haddon County.

Haddon County is a cadastral division of Queensland, Australia. It is a county of the South Gregory District of far western Queensland (25.80°S 141.45°E). The county is divided into civil parishes.

== History ==
The county has been in its current form since 8 March 1901, when the Governor of Queensland issued a proclamation legally dividing Queensland into counties under the Land Act 1897. Like all counties in Queensland, it is a non-functional administrative unit, that is used mainly for the purpose of registering land titles. From 30 November 2015, the government no longer referenced counties and parishes in land information systems but the Museum of Lands, Mapping and Surveying retains a record for historical purposes.

== Geography ==
The county is known for Haddon Corner and is part of the Channel Country, a flat, arid area of broad acre agriculture.

The center of local government is Thargomindah. approximately 1,000 kilometres (620 mi) west of the state capital, Brisbane.
