= Iffley County, Queensland =

County in Queensland, Australia

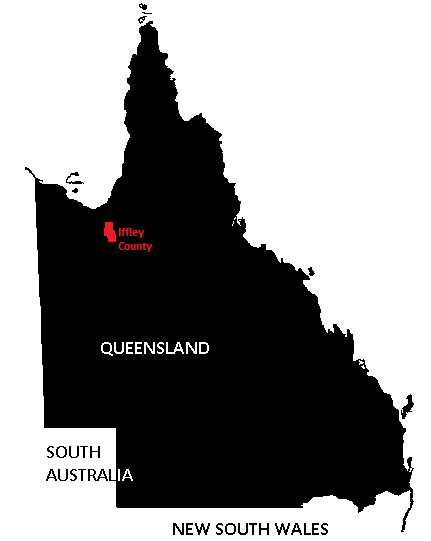
Iffley County, Queensland.

Iffley County is one of the 318 counties of Queensland, Australia. The county is divided into civil parishes.

The county came into existence in the 19th century, and on 8 March 1901, the Governor of Queensland issued a proclamation legally dividing Queensland into counties under the Land Act 1897.

Like all counties in Queensland, it is a non-functional administrative unit, that is used mainly for the purpose of registering land titles. From 30 November 2015, the government no longer referenced counties and parishes in land information systems however the Museum of Lands, Mapping and Surveying retains a record for historical purposes.
