= County of Plantagenet, Queensland =

Plantagenet Queensland
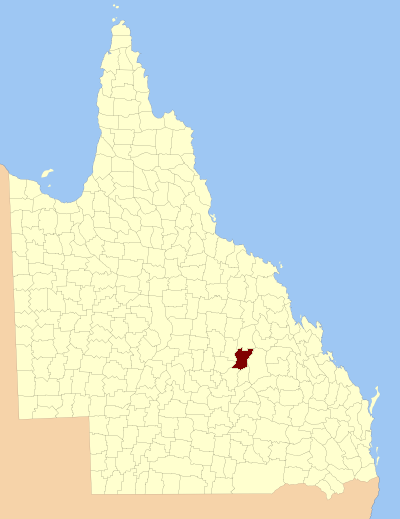
- Location within Queensland
Lands administrative divisions around Plantagenet:
Belyando	Clermont	Clermont
Drummond	Plantagenet	Denison
Claude	Buckland	Buckland

The County of Plantagenet is one of the lands administrative divisions of Queensland that has existed since 1901. The county is divided into civil parishes. It is located in the Central Highlands Region of Central Queensland.

== Parishes ==
It contains the following parishes:

Parish	LGA	Coordinates	Towns
Anakie	Central Highlands	23°30′S 147°51′E	Anakie
Argyll	Central Highlands	23°28′S 147°26′E	
Ducabrook	Central Highlands	23°55′S 147°20′E	
Dunstable	Central Highlands	24°03′S 147°38′E	
Echo Hills	Central Highlands	24°03′S 147°26′E	
Glendarriwell	Central Highlands	23°36′S 147°50′E	
Kilsyth	Central Highlands	24°03′S 147°15′E	
Maaland	Central Highlands	24°09′S 147°09′E	
Medway	Central Highlands	23°48′S 147°20′E	
Narcissus	Central Highlands	24°09′S 147°23′E	
Raymond	Central Highlands	24°09′S 147°37′E	
Riddell	Central Highlands	23°43′S 147°47′E	
Rutland	Central Highlands	23°53′S 147°41′E	
Southernwood	Central Highlands	23°39′S 147°42′E	
Tresswell	Central Highlands	24°14′S 147°30′E	
Wilford	Central Highlands	23°50′S 147°33′E	
Withersfield	Central Highlands	23°35′S 147°30′E	
Woodbine	Central Highlands	23°42′S 147°28′E	
Zamia	Central Highlands	23°37′S 147°18′E	Bogantungan
