= County of Titheroo, Queensland =

County in Queensland, Australia

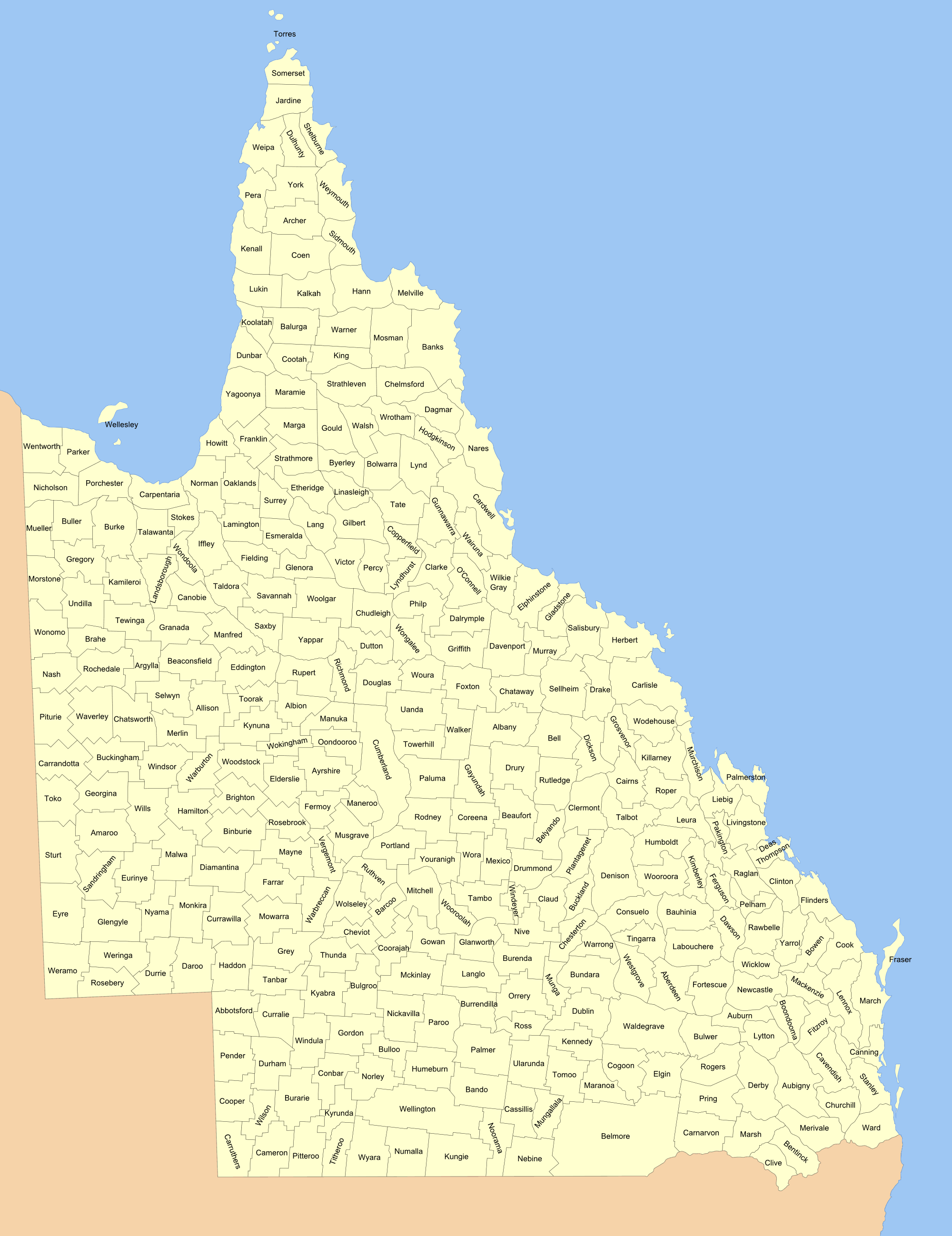
Queensland cadastral divisions 1901

Titheroo County is one of the 318 counties of Queensland, Australia. The county is divided into civil parishes. It is within the South Gregory Land District.

The county was carved off from the adjoining Wellington County in 1901. The county is sparsely settled and lies on the Queensland - New South Wales border. The seat of local government is the town of Cunnamulla which lies in the adjacent Wellington County.

== History ==
The original indigenous inhabitants of the area were the Karenggapa and Kunja people. The area's first European explorer was Thomas Mitchell who passed through the region in 1846.

The state border forms the southern boundary of the County and Narriearra Caryapundy Swamp National Park in New South Wales is to the south of the county.
