= Rosebery County, Queensland =

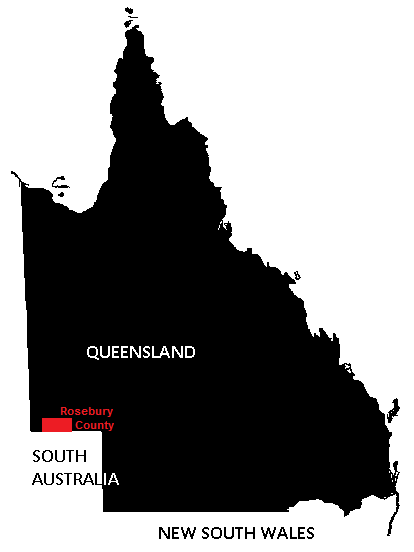

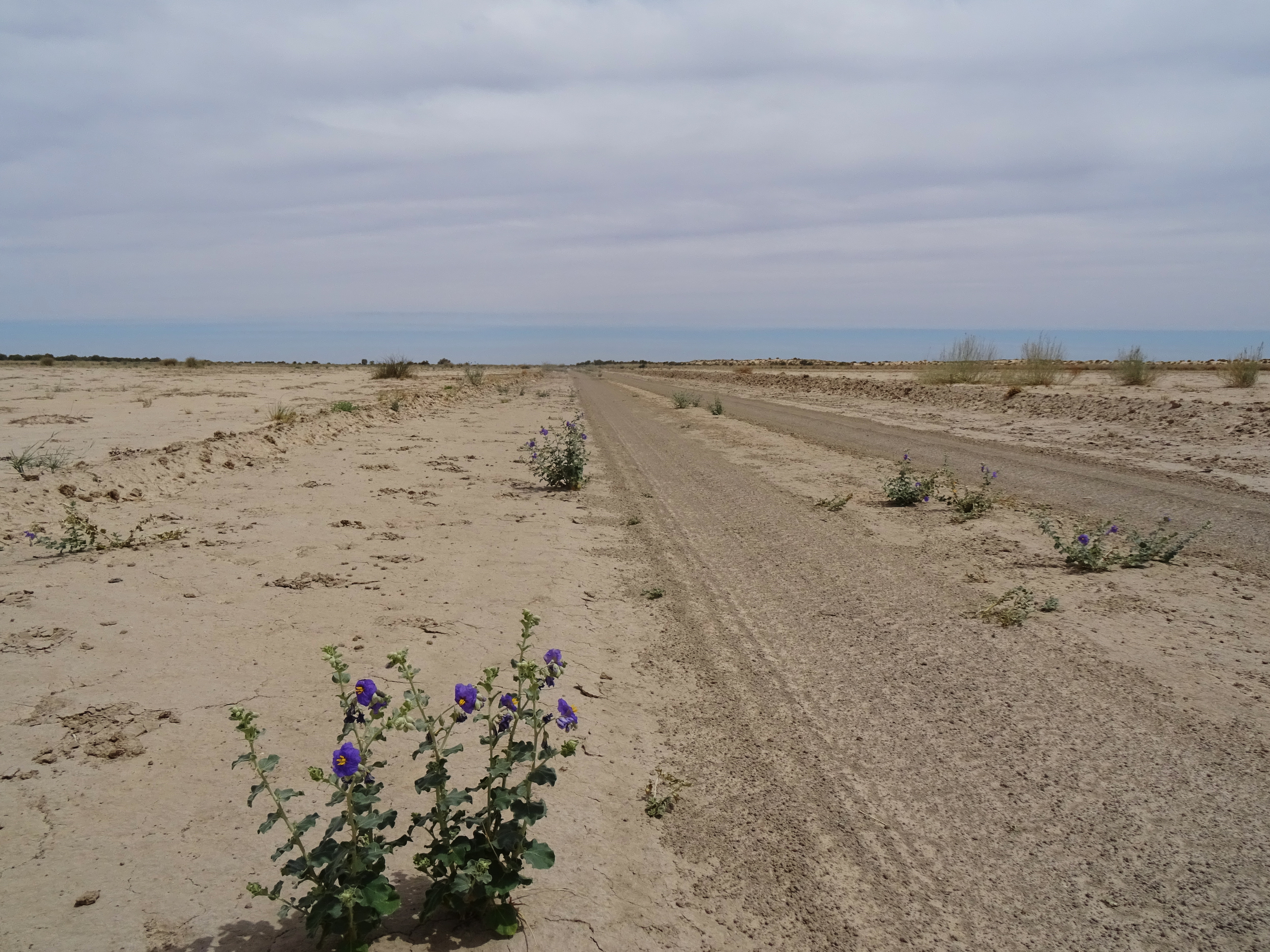
The landscape of Rosebery County

The County of Rosebery is a county (a cadastral division) in Queensland, Australia. It is centred in the South Gregory Lands District. Like all counties in Queensland, it is a non-functional administrative unit, that is used mainly for the purpose of registering land titles.

The county is divided into civil parishes.

== History ==
County of Rosebery was traditional lands of the Wongkanguru people, and the first pastoralists to the area were in the 1870s with the town of Birdsville founded in the early 1880s. The seat of local government is in Bedourie, Queensland, having been in Birdsville till 1953. The Courthouse at Birdsville still operates. The county came into being in March 1901, when the Queensland Governor issued a proclamation legally dividing Queensland into counties under the Land Act 1897.
