= Glanworth County, Queensland =

County of Queensland

Coordinates: 25.23°S 145.75°E

Glanworth is a county in the Blackall-Tambo Region, Queensland, Australia.

It is located on the Westphalia Creek about 760km north-west of Queenland's capital city, Brisbane, and has an elevation of approximately 366m above sea level.

Like all counties in Queensland, it is a non-functional administrative unit, that is used mainly for the purpose of registering land titles. From 30 November 2015, the government no longer referenced counties and parishes in land information systems; however the Museum of Lands, Mapping and Surveying retains a record for historical purposes.
