= Kendall County, Queensland =

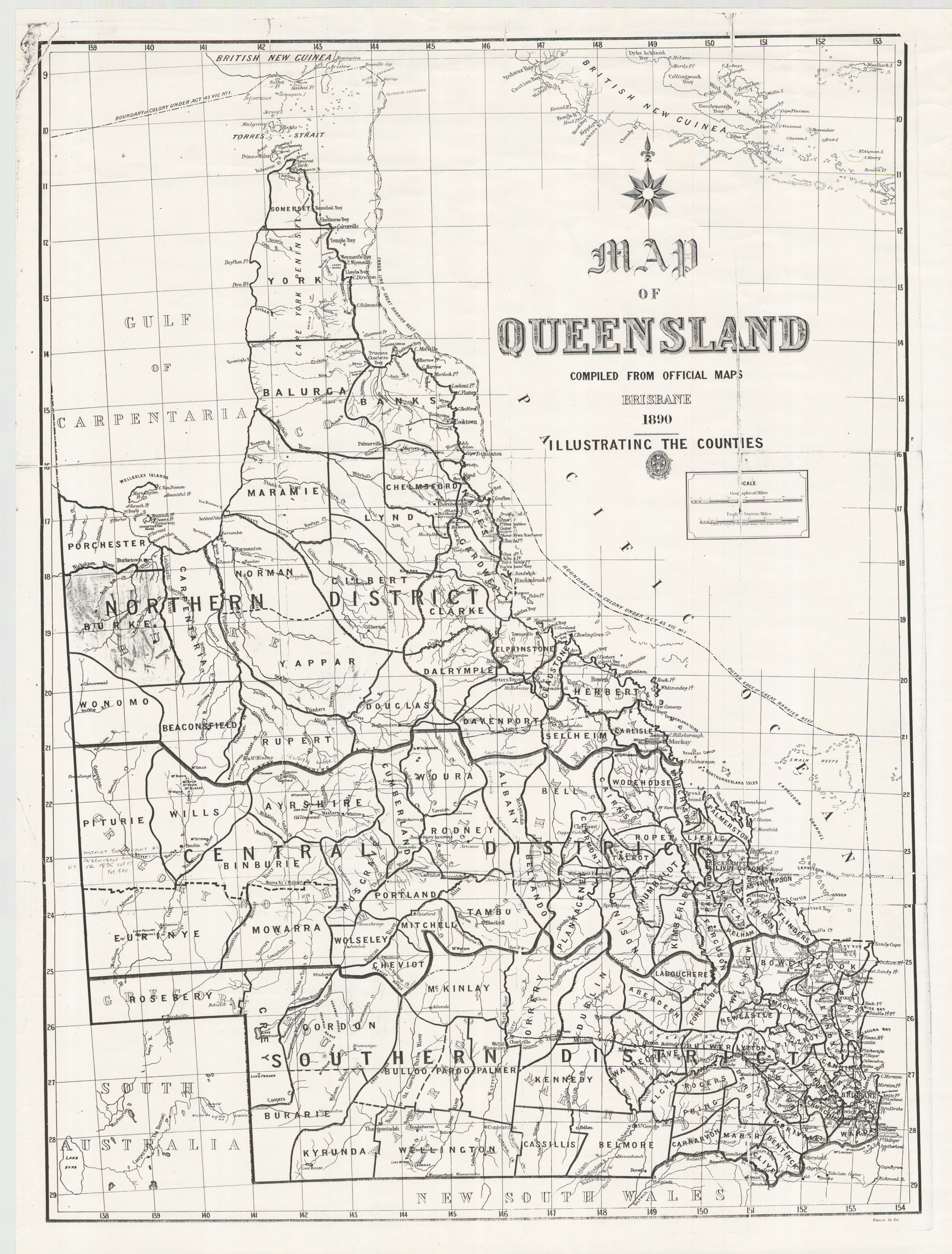
The Queensland counties, 1890

Kendall County is a county of Queensland located at 13.683°S 141.967°E on the Cape York Peninsula in remote far north of Queensland, Australia.

== History ==
The county is probably named for the Kendall River, which flows in the area and was named by Francis Lascelles Jardine (1841–1919) pastoralist and Alexander William Jardine (1843–1920) pastoralist and engineer, on 31 December 1867, after a friend of Archibald John Richardson (1837–1900) surveyor, who accompanied them in 1863. There is an unsupported possibility that this friend was poet Thomas Henry Kendall (1839–1882).

The county was created by Queensland's Governor in Council 7 March 1901 under provisions of the Land Act 1897.

The county came into existence in the 19th century, but on 8 March 1901, when the Governor of Queensland issued a proclamation legally dividing Queensland into counties under the Land Act 1897.

Like all counties in Queensland, it is a non-functional administrative unit, that is used mainly for the purpose of registering land titles. From 30 November 2015, the government no longer referenced counties and parishes in land information systems however the Museum of Lands, Mapping and Surveying retains a record for historical purposes.

The county is divided into civil parishes.
