= Burrandilla County, Queensland =

Burrandilla County is a cadastral division of Queensland and a county of the Warrego Land District of south western Queensland. The county is divided into civil parishes.

== History ==
Prior to colonisation, the county was traditional lands of the Wadjalang people. The county was formally established on 8 March 1901, when the Governor of Queensland issued a proclamation legally dividing Queensland into counties under the Land Act 1897. At that time, the county was apportioned out of Palmer County.

Like all counties in Queensland, it is a non-functional administrative unit, that is used mainly for the purpose of registering land titles. From 30 November 2015, the government no longer referenced counties and parishes in land information systems however the Museum of Lands, Mapping and Surveying retains a record for historical purposes.

== Geography ==
The center of local government for the County is Charleville, Queensland to the east and the postal code is 4470.
