= Porchester County, Queensland =

Porchester County is a cadastral division and a County of Queensland located on the Gulf of Carpentaria adjacent to the Northern Territory border. The county is divided into civil parishes.

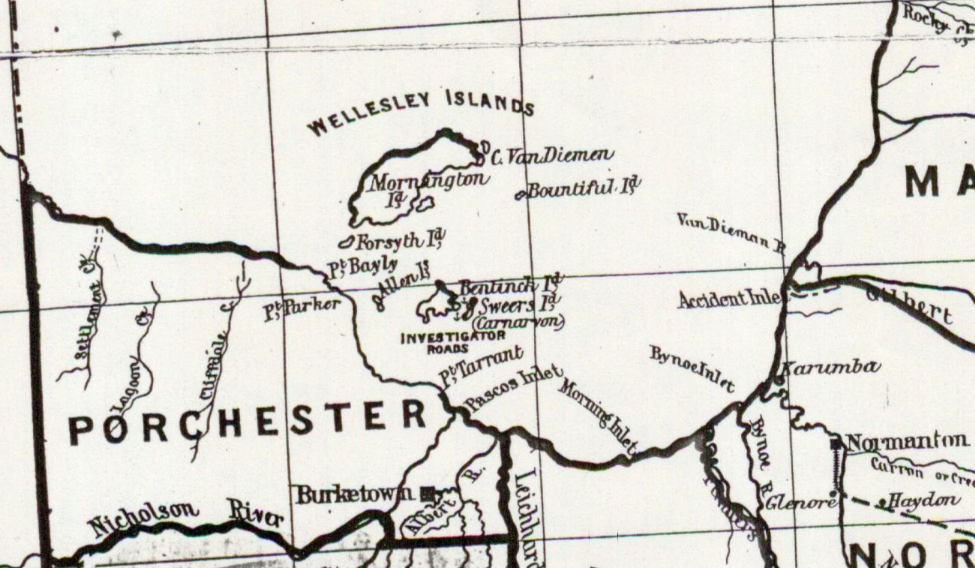
Extract of Map of the Queensland counties, 1890

The county has been in its current form since 8 March 1901, when the Governor of Queensland issued a proclamation legally dividing Queensland into counties under the Land Act 1897. Like all counties in Queensland, it is a non-functional administrative unit, that is used mainly for the purpose of registering land titles. From 30 November 2015, the government no longer referenced counties and parishes in land information systems however the Museum of Lands, Mapping and Surveying retains a record for historical purposes.

The center of local government is Burketown.
