= County of Mackenzie =

Mackenzie Queensland
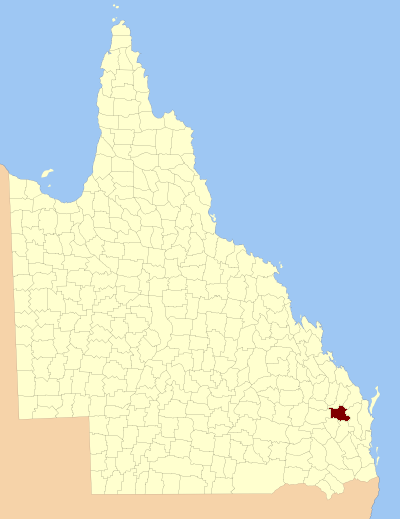
- Location within Queensland
Lands administrative divisions around Mackenzie:
Wicklow	Bowen	Cook
Newcastle	Mackenzie	Lennox
Boondooma	Fitzroy	Lennox

The County of Mackenzie is a county (a cadastral division) in Queensland, Australia, located in the Wide Bay–Burnett region. It was named after Robert Ramsay Mackenzie, who served as Premier of Queensland in 1867–1868 and was also member for Burnett, it was formally named and bounded by the Governor in Council on 7 March 1901 under the Land Act 1897.

== Parishes ==
Mackenzie is divided into parishes, as listed below:

Parish	LGA	Coordinates	Towns
Aranbanga	North Burnett	25°47′S 151°35′E	
Ban Ban	North Burnett	25°46′S 151°54′E	
Barabara	North Burnett	25°50′S 151°25′E	
Beninbi	South Burnett	25°55′S 151°41′E	
Boonara	Gympie	26°03′S 152°04′E	
Boonimba	Gympie	25°52′S 151°50′E	
Booubyjan	Gympie	25°54′S 151°59′E	Booubyjan
Dundar	North Burnett	25°40′S 151°54′E	Coalstoun Lakes
Gayndah	North Burnett	25°40′S 151°35′E	Gayndah (S)
Ginoondan	North Burnett	25°34′S 151°43′E	Wetheron
Gooroolballin	North Burnett	25°34′S 151°50′E	Gooroolba, Byrnestown
Grongah	Gympie	25°57′S 152°08′E	
Johngboon	North Burnett	25°48′S 151°42′E	
Kinellan	North Burnett	25°42′S 151°43′E	
Malmaison	North Burnett	25°44′S 151°26′E	
Mundubbera	North Burnett	25°39′S 151°21′E	Boynewood
Nangur	Gympie	26°06′S 152°01′E	
Toondahra	North Burnett	25°56′S 151°26′E	
Wigton	South Burnett	25°59′S 151°34′E	
Windera	South Burnett	26°02′S 151°52′E	Windera
Woroon	South Burnett	26°04′S 151°43′E	

== External links ==
- "Map of the County of Mackenzie". Queensland Government. 1922.
