= Bribie Island Second World War Fortifications =

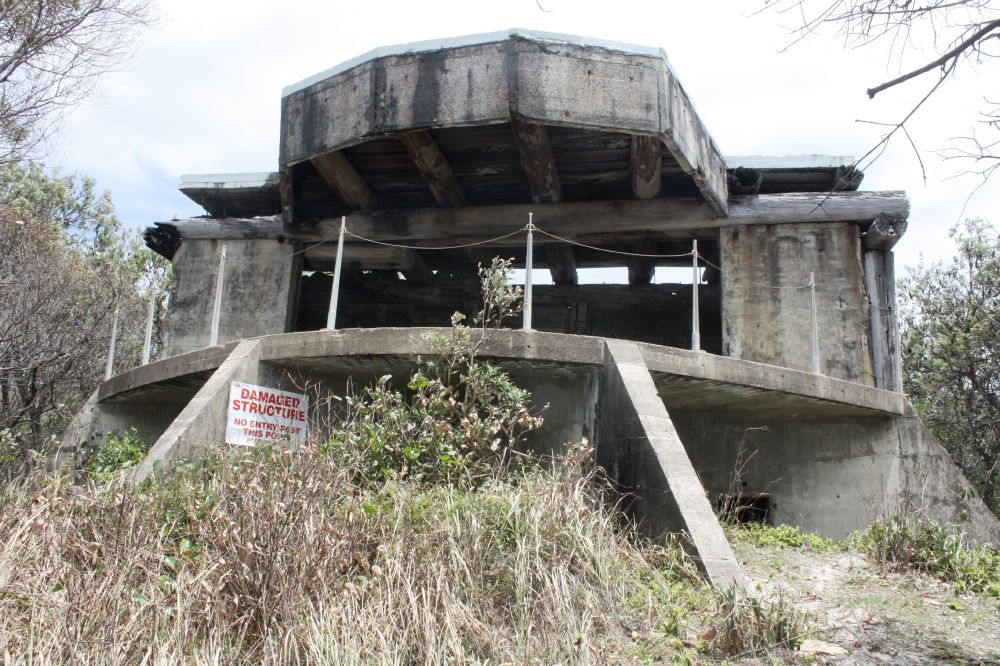
- Southern gun emplacement from east, 2013

- Location within Queensland Location within Australia
- Location: Woorim, City of Moreton Bay and Bribie Island North, Sunshine Coast Region, Queensland, Australia

History
- Design period: 1939–1945 (World War II)
- Built: 1939–1943

Queensland Heritage Register
- Official name: Bribie Island Second World War Fortifications
- Type: state heritage (archaeological, built)
- Designated: 20 July 1993
- Reference no.: 601143
- Significant period: 1939–1943 (fabric); 1939–1945 (historical)
- Significant components: searchlight emplacement, engine/generator shed/room / power supply, pump house, observation post (military), command post, signal station/post, cable – communication, sewage farm/treatment site, mine control station (military), gun emplacement, slab/s – concrete

The Bribie Island Second World War Fortifications are heritage-listed fortifications at Woorim and Bribie Island North on Bribie Island, Queensland, Australia. They were built from 1939 to 1943 and were added to the Queensland Heritage Register on 20 July 1993.

== History ==
The Bribie Island Fortifications were constructed from 1939 to 1943 as part of the systems of defence of southeast Queensland during the Second World War, and to provide artillery training for Australian soldiers for overseas service. Other fortifications were also apparent throughout Moreton Bay during the war, at Caloundra and on Moreton Island at Cowan Cowan Point and Rous, which together with the existing installations at Fort Lytton, provided a coordinated series of defensive batteries for the region.

As events in Europe and Asia in the 1930s moved the world towards war, various sectors of Australia's defence, including coastal fortifications, were examined. There was an increased emphasis on defence rearmament from 1935. As major cities and ports along the coastline would be exposed to damage from naval raids or attack, coastal defences were to be upgraded. Batteries were established in Sydney, Darwin and along the Western Australia coast. Invasion was not a major concern at this stage, rather the batteries were for defence against seaborne shelling or the torpedoing of ports.

The defence of the Moreton Bay region was concentrated on the mouth of the Brisbane River at Fort Lytton, constructed in 1880–81, until the mid 1930s, when attempts were made to upgrade the region's defence.

The shipping channels in Moreton Bay simplified the proposed placement of batteries. The major access route into the Brisbane River was the northwest channel, which ran close to the shore near Caloundra, across the bay in a southeasterly direction towards Moreton Island, and then southwesterly towards the mouth of the river, forming a Z-shaped route. This dictated the ideal positions for artillery batteries, with the most effective sites for guns being the closest points to the channel bends.

On 1 September 1939 Germany invaded Poland, and on 3 September Australia declared war on Germany.

=== Fort Bribie ===
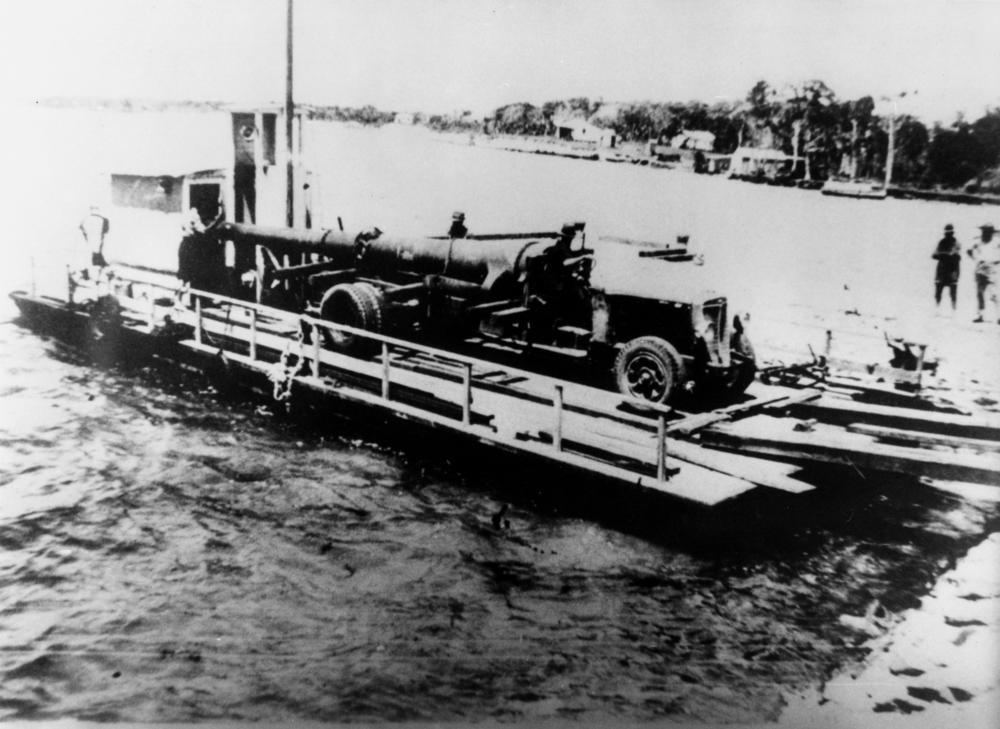
Naval gun being ferried across to Bribie Island, 1939

Bribie Island was a popular holiday destination from the early twentieth century. Steamers from Brisbane docked at the jetty on the southwestern side of the island, and a road led across the island to the settlement of Woorim, the surfing beach of the island. The island supported a small community, and the permanent residents of the eastern side were relocated from their homes when the Australian Army began moving in to the island in 1939.

It appears that in 1939, temporary batteries were installed at Caloundra and northern Bribie Island, to provide defence support for the RAN against light raiding warships. A battery had previously been installed at Cowan Cowan Point on Moreton Island, possibly pre-1934.

Two six inch guns, surplus from the First World War, were transported across Pumicestone Passage from the mainland to form the Battery at the northern end of Bribie Island (26.8540°S 153.1292°E). The guns were originally installed on cruciform mountings, consisting of two steel members forming a cross upon which the gun was sited, which were found to be inadequate, for after firing the guns the pivot tilted quite dramatically.

During 1940, much discussion was carried out as to whether a Battery should be located at Caloundra instead. The two sites were weighted as to their respective advantages and disadvantages, and it was decided that Bribie was tactically better placed than Caloundra. It was decided that Fort Bribie would be developed as the principal defensive site of Moreton Bay, to be the Examination Battery at which ships identified themselves. At this stage, Fort Bribie was considered to be of little value from a defensive viewpoint, and it was announced that a detailed survey was to be made of the site.

Colonel John Whitelaw, Commander Coast Defences, Eastern Command, inspected the Fort Bribie site during 1940–41 and advised on the required structures within the fort. His recommendations were carried out during 1941, and the fort was operational by early 1942. Construction work was undertaken by the Commonwealth Department of the Interior and cost approximately £55,000, including construction of the fortress buildings, administrative, logistical and residential structures, building works and engineering services. The Fort Bribie layout changed often, with the Command Post moving position and new buildings and dugouts being constructed. The fort contained two six inch gun emplacements, and a Battery Observation Post (BOP) 200 yards (180 m) to the north containing the Battery Command and Depression Range Finder with a Barr & Stroud Rangefinder on a concrete platform to the east of this structure. Whitelaw recommended that a Fortress Observation Post (FOP) be installed at Caloundra, to work in conjunction with the BOP at Fort Bribie. Many of the barrack buildings, recreation halls and ablution blocks were constructed of fibrous cement sheeting or timber on a concrete base.

With the entry of Japan into the war in early December 1941, and their subsequent assaults on British and American positions in southeast Asia, Australia was under grave threat of invasion for the first time in its white history. Reinforcements were sent to Fort Bribie and Fort Cowan Cowan, strengthening the existing defences at the two forts.

The onslaught of the Pacific War brought the Americans, with large supplies of men and material. A number of 155 millimetres (6.1 in) guns from the First World War were provided to upgrade Australian coastal defences, and new forts were constructed during 1942–43 at Skirmish Point on south Bribie Island and Rous on Moreton Island. The Skirmish Point Battery at Woorim contained two fixed 155 millimetres (6.1 in) gun emplacements on Panama mounts.

The Australian Women's Army Service (AWAS) arrived in 1943, and were involved in most aspects except the manning of the guns. Other smaller groups in attendance included the Royal Australian Navy (mine control huts), Volunteer Defence Corps, and a group of American artillery who were stationed at Toorbul Point but training at Bribie Island. Mosquitoes were a problem at the fort, and apparently many soldiers suffered from dengue fever and were possibly treated at the camp hospital, not yet located.

=== RAN Station No.4 ===
The defences of the Moreton Bay region were increased during 1942–43 with naval and anti-aircraft defences. Sites were chosen for the latter on the mainland, with the naval defences located at various sites on the Moreton Bay islands.

In June 1942, the Commander of the Allied Naval Forces in the Southwest Pacific Area requested as a matter of high priority that Moreton Bay be developed as a naval operating base. This involved a series of structures on both sides and within the greater bay region. In conjunction with the loop controlled minefields in operation off Fort Bribie (of which the mine control huts at this fort were a part), this naval base involved a system of indicator loops (submerged magnetic cables that would pick up the path of a vessel passing over them on or below the surface) between Skirmish Point at Bribie and Comboyuro Point on Moreton Island, harbour defences ASDICS (anti-submarine detecting systems) south of the loops, and anti-boat gun defences. These activities required a controlling position which would be located in the vicinity of the loop fields, which had been sited between Skirmish Point Battery and Fort Cowan Cowan.

The control position for the naval base installations in Moreton Bay was subsequently sited at Skirmish Point, just north of the 155 millimetres (6.1 in) Battery at Woorim (27.0580°S 153.1989°E).

The buildings were vacated by the RAN and occupied by the Department of the Army in September 1944. An inventory taken in 1945, when buildings were being disposed of, included the reinforced concrete Control Post and two engine houses, along with kitchens, ablutions, sleeping huts and stores.

=== Operations Scaled Down ===
The batteries had been reduced in personnel levels in the latter years of the war as the Japanese threat receded. In 1945, instructions were given for all coastal defences, except those in Darwin, Sydney and Fremantle, to be scaled down and kept in a state of care and maintenance. After the Second World War, the defence of ports came within the ambit of the navy and air force rather than the army. With the reassessment of Australia's defensive arrangements in the 1950s, the role of artillery batteries in coastal defence diminished. At this stage Brisbane was still a defended port, but by 1960 this arrangement was redefined and only the three ports previously mentioned were designated defended ports.

The batteries at Fort Bribie and Skirmish Point were scaled down as a result. Any building material at the fort that could be disassembled and used elsewhere was taken apart and transported off the island. Some of the barracks buildings were cut down off their stumps and sold as housing, with the concrete slabs remaining. The reinforced concrete structures remained however. The remaining fort structures at Fort Bribie have since been used as camping areas, shelter for itinerants and have suffered vandalism and neglect.

With the proximity of the structures of Skirmish Point Battery to the ocean, the gun emplacements and other structures gradually fell into the sea and were disposed of in the 1970s. The only remaining structure of the Battery is the northern Fortress Observation Post.

Most of the RAN Station No.4 buildings, located at Skirmish Point at Woorim, were dismantled. The station was handed over to the Army in October 1944. The reinforced concrete structures remain, and have suffered from vandalism.

In early 1993, a conservation study was carried out. A total of eight reinforced concrete structures were identified at Fort Bribie, one at the Skirmish Point Battery and three at the RAN Station No.4.

== Description ==
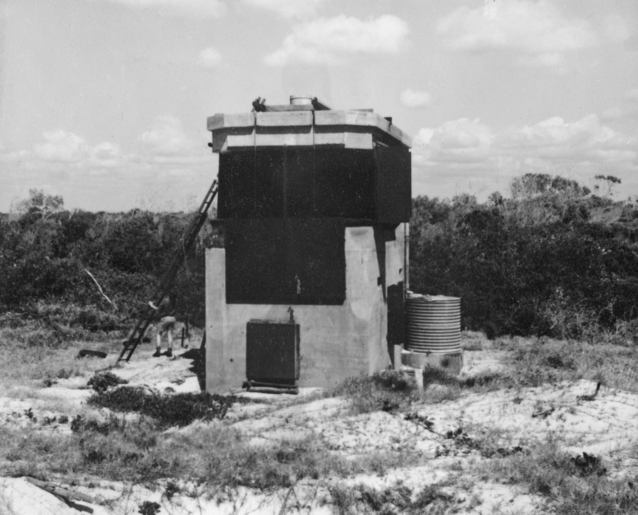
A fortified observation post on Bribie Island in 1943. The post was subsequently camouflaged.

The Bribie Island Second World War Fortifications are located along the eastern shore of Bribie Island and consist of the remains of three groups; Fort Bribie on north Bribie Island, Skirmish Point Battery to the north of Woorim at south Bribie Island, and the Royal Australian Navy Station No.4 at the north end of Woorim.

These groups are located facing the northwest channel, being the entrance to Moreton Bay from the Coral Sea/Pacific Ocean, and within sight of Moreton Island to the southeast and Caloundra to the north.

Bribie Island is relatively flat and the northern end is affected by shifting dune formations and tidal erosion. As a result, some remaining structures do not have the same position in relation to the shoreline as they had when constructed.

=== Fort Bribie ===
Through the 1993 conservation study, a total of eight reinforced concrete structures have been identified; this study did not document the remains of the camp, consisting of concrete slabs and stumps of buildings and showing their layout.

The majority of buildings are located behind the first row of dunes, with the exception being the northern searchlight which now stands exposed on the beach within reach of the high tide. The camp area is overgrown, mainly with lantana, and none of the original tracks and access routes can at this stage be determined.

- No.1 Gun Emplacement: This is the most dominant and visually striking structure within the group, and along with the No.2 Gun is centrally located behind the first dune. This symmetrical two- storeyed structure consists of a raised concrete platform, with buttressed supports, on which the six inch gun was fixed facing east. The structure is open to the east, curved to allow a wide angle of sight, and has a central metal gun mounting. It originally had steel doors. The western side of the platform is enclosed, with a shell handling facility on the northern side which accessed the storage area below. The platform is accessed from the west via an external concrete stair on the central east-west axis. The form of the structure, and the method of ascension, gives a sense of ritual and discovery. The platform is roofed by heavy timber logs, cantilevered to the east, with timber boarding and concrete above and cement filled hessian bag infill. Large timber post and beam support members are located on the exterior walls. Remnants of painted camouflage are visible on the northern wall. The ground floor contains a room at the southwest with the remains of a duty roster on the northern wall, with another room to the east of this. Shell storage rooms are located on the northern side.
- Southern Searchlight: The two searchlights remain at the extreme ends of the site, forming the northern and southern boundaries. This two-storeyed structure, rectangular in plan, is located behind the first dune and has an enclosed ground floor where the generator was housed. The first floor has an open eastern side, exposed to the sea for the operation of the searchlight. Window openings are located on each side, with a first floor doorway and landing on the southern side.
- No.2 Gun Emplacement: This is a similar structure to the No.1 Gun Emplacement, except that due to fire the timber members and roof structure have collapsed, resulting in a predominantly single-storey structure with rubble covering the platform. Rusted remains of the platform steel doors are located to the southeast. The ground floor is relatively intact, with a clearer duty roster than in the No.1 Gun Emplacement.
- Northerly Mine Control Hut: The two mine control huts were operated by the Royal Australian Navy. This single-storeyed structure, rectangular in plan, is mostly buried in the first dune, with an entrance at the southwest end and a vent pipe at the north end. The walls have timber grounds cast into the concrete.
- Southerly Mine Control Hut: This is the larger of the two structures, being square in plan and mostly buried in the first dune. The entrance is from the west, and has a front hall with a steel door which has been attached more recently. The walls have timber grounds cast into the concrete, and the ceiling has two vent pipes.
- Northern Searchlight: This is a similar structure to the Southern Searchlight, but is now exposed on the beach and within reach of the high tide. It was presumably in a similar position to the Southern searchlight originally. Caloundra City Council signs have been attached to the southern side of the structure, preventing further access past this point.
- Battery Observation Post: Originally this structure was approximately 15 metres (49 ft) in height, and overlooked the ocean observing shipping in the bay. It is located at the top of the first dune, and consists of a raised concrete platform, rectangular in plan, with a partial wall to the north and east. It apparently housed a Barr & Stroud Rangefinder.
- Signals Operations Room: This structure is located behind the first dune, and appears to have been originally buried within the dune. A single-storeyed concrete structure, it is rectangular in plan and is accessed via a stair from above on the northwest side. A large hole has been smashed in the western wall.

=== Camp Layout ===
A number of building locations have been identified, with the remains consisting of concrete slabs, concrete perimeter base walls, some of which have metal flashings, concrete stumps and more substantial reinforced concrete structures. These include:

- Camp Area: Concrete slab remains of the Officer's Mess and Kitchen, concrete stumps and steps to the Command Post and other unidentified structures, and the flagpole base to the Command Post.
- Men's Latrines: A concrete slab with a central row of eight WC's, back to back, which have been smashed off at their base. On either side is a concrete trough urinal. To the south is the position of the Officer's Latrines and to the west are the concrete stumps to the former water tanks and a row of timber posts which originally carried a pipe and led to the pump house.
- Pump House: A square, inground concrete structure with stairs on the northwestern side. The structure is filled with water, so it is unclear as to whether there are machinery mounting positions remaining.
- Sewerage Treatment Works: A tall concrete structure, open above, containing a central V-shaped chamber with timber gates/baffles either end and smaller chambers either side. A projection on the western side with a pipe outlet/connection suggests this is where the pipeline to the western side of the island, consisting of a series of concrete mountings, was connected.
- Power House: A rectangular concrete slab, with two raised generator mounting platforms at the eastern end, and a timber power pole to the south.

=== Skirmish Point Battery ===
Due to erosion, most of the Skirmish Point Battery has been lost. The two gun emplacements, command post and two searchlights were located close to the beach between the ocean and North Street. The Battery Plotting Room, located on the corner of North Street and Fourth Avenue, does not survive.

- Fortress Observation Post: This is the only element of the Skirmish Point Battery to survive, located 4–5 kilometres (2.5–3.1 mi) along the beach north of the Battery. Located on top of the first dune, originally it was positioned on tall timber stumps, but now rests on its side. The structure consists of a concrete box with an opening to the east, with concrete stands on which the readings were taken. Concrete footings are located nearby to the south.

=== Royal Australian Navy Station No.4 ===
The RAN Station No.4 was inserted within the Skirmish Point Battery, but it appears that the naval and fort buildings had no direct relationship with each other. There are three remaining reinforced concrete structures, located at the north end of North Street Woorim.

- Naval Control Post: This single-storeyed structure is located at the crest of the first dune, with a long corner window with a view to the north east. The structure has a flat concrete roof, and window openings have concrete hoods. The entry is from the west via a short hall with a steel door, leading into a central corridor with six rooms. Communication cables and ducting is attached to the ceiling in the corridor, and the interior of the building is covered in graffiti.
- Southerly Engine Room: This single-storeyed, single roomed structure is located in a park behind the first dune. The structure has a flat concrete roof and has been painted green with bars attached to window openings and to the western entrance.
- Northerly Engine Room: This is a similar structure to the Southerly Engine Room. It is located in the undergrowth to the north of a gravel car parking area which accesses the beach and four wheel drive track. The structure does not have bars to window openings or to the northwestern entrance.

== Heritage listing ==
Bribie Island Second World War Fortifications was listed on the Queensland Heritage Register on 20 July 1993 having satisfied the following criteria.

The place is important in demonstrating the evolution or pattern of Queensland's history.

The Bribie Island Second World War Fortifications are important in demonstrating the pattern of Queensland's history, being part of the preparations for the defence of Australia, in particular the Moreton Bay region, during the 1930s and the Second World War.

The place has potential to yield information that will contribute to an understanding of Queensland's history.

They have potential to yield information that will contribute to the understanding of Queensland's history, in that there are extensive remnants of Second World War fortification sites.

The place is important in demonstrating the principal characteristics of a particular class of cultural places.

They are important in demonstrating the principal characteristics of Australia's Second World War coastal defence fortifications.

The place is important because of its aesthetic significance.

They are important in exhibiting a range of aesthetic characteristics valued by the community, in particular the isolation, and sense of place, of the Fort Bribie fortifications, and the sense of discovery enhanced by the overgrown landscape; the form, scale and materials of the Fort Bribie, Skirmish Point Battery and Royal Australian Navy Station No.4 fortifications; and the siting and landmark quality of Fort Bribie, Skirmish Point Battery and the Royal Australian Navy Station No.4 fortifications.

The place has a special association with the life or work of a particular person, group or organisation of importance in Queensland's history.

They have a strong association with the Second World War Queensland defence efforts of the Australian Military Force and Royal Australian Navy.
