= County of Dawson =

Dawson Queensland
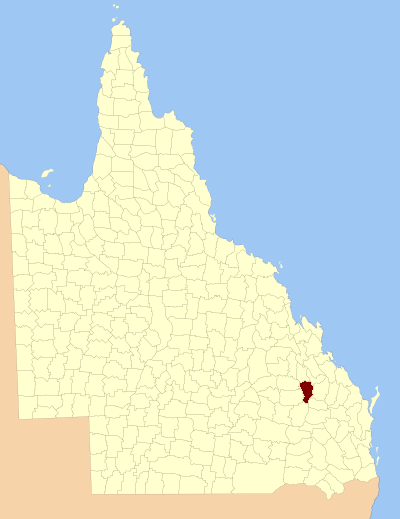
- Location within Queensland
Lands administrative divisions around Dawson:
Bauhinia	Ferguson	Pelham
Labouchere	Dawson	Rawbelle
Labouchere	Fortescue	Wicklow

The County of Dawson is a county (a cadastral division) in Queensland, Australia, located in the Shire of Banana in Central Queensland. The county is divided into civil parishes. The county was officially named and bounded by the Governor in Council on 7 March 1901 under the Land Act 1897.

== Parishes ==
Dawson is divided into parishes, as listed below:

Parish	LGA	Coordinates	Towns
Belmont	Banana	24°47′S 150°21′E	
Blackman	Banana	25°21′S 150°12′E	
Camboon	Banana	25°05′S 150°30′E	Camboon
Colombo	Banana	24°51′S 150°30′E	
Coteeda	Banana	25°09′S 150°12′E	
Cracow	Banana	25°24′S 150°19′E	Cracow
Dresden	Banana	25°16′S 150°22′E	
Kianga	Banana	24°43′S 150°07′E	
Mungungal	Banana	25°08′S 150°21′E	
Okangal	Banana	25°01′S 150°19′E	
Tarramba	Banana	24°39′S 150°14′E	
Walloon	Banana	24°57′S 150°08′E	Theodore
Woolthorpe	Banana	24°51′S 150°05′E	
Woolton	Banana	24°54′S 150°20′E	

== External links ==
- "Map of the County of Dawson". Queensland Government. 1918.
