= Golden Beach, Queensland =

Golden Beach
- Suburb
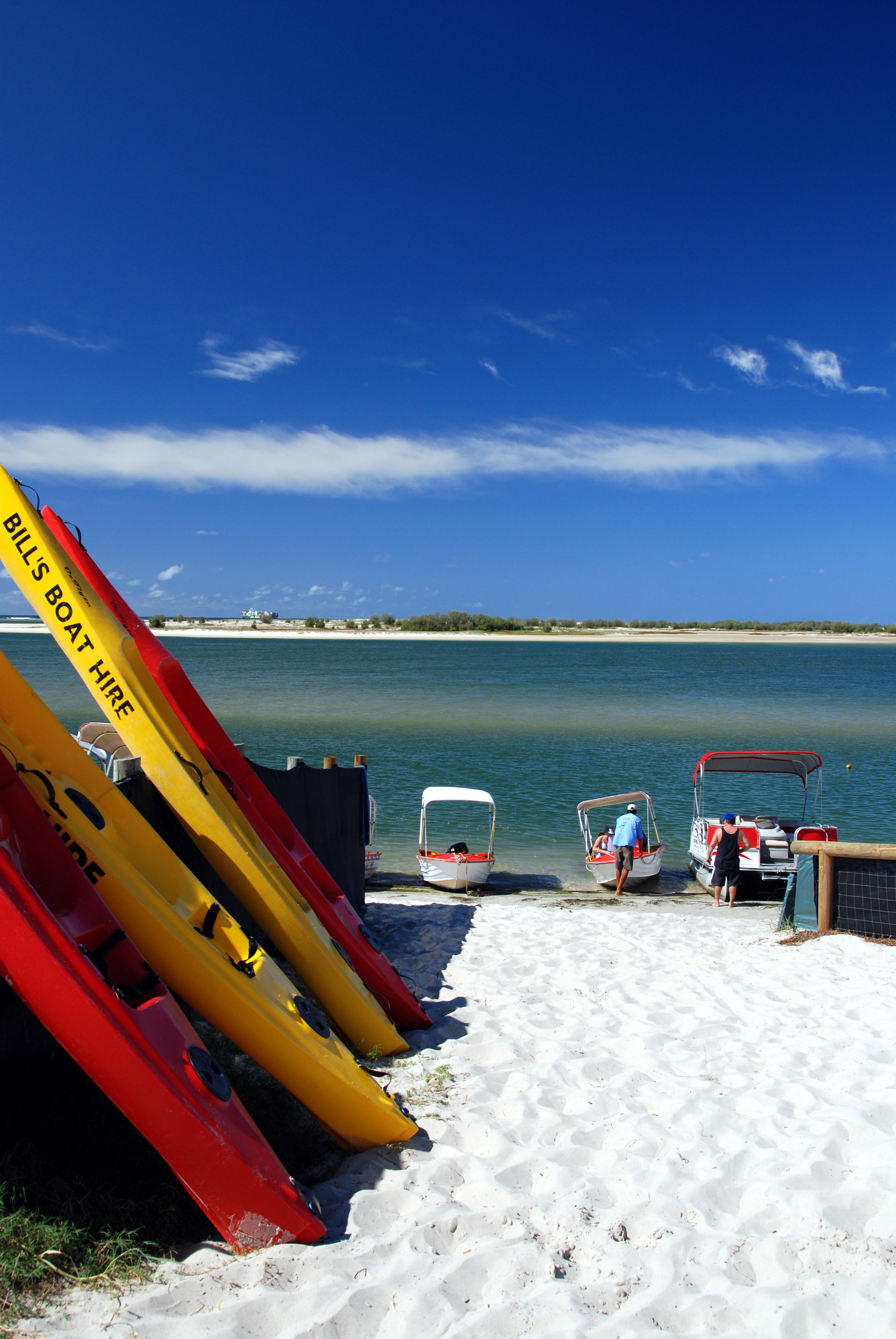
- Golden Beach, looking across Pumicestone Passage towards Bribie Island

- Interactive map of Golden Beach
- Coordinates: 26.8227°S 153.1219°E
- Country: Australia
- State: Queensland
- City: Caloundra
- LGA: Sunshine Coast Region
- Location: 2.1 km (1.3 mi) S of Caloundra CBD; 22.3 km (13.9 mi) S of Maroochydore; 96.7 km (60.1 mi) N of Brisbane

Government
  - State electorate: Caloundra
  - Federal division: Fisher

Area
  - Total: 4.2 km^{2} (1.6 sq mi)

Population
  - Total: 5,646 (2021 census)
  - Density: 1,344/km^{2} (3,480/sq mi)
- Time zone: UTC+10:00 (AEST)
- Postcode: 4551
- County: Canning
- Parish: Bribie
Suburbs around Golden Beach
Caloundra West	Caloundra	Bribie Island North
Pelican Waters	Golden Beach	Bribie Island North
Pelican Waters	Coochin Creek	Bribie Island North

Golden Beach is a coastal suburb of Caloundra in the Sunshine Coast Region, Queensland, Australia. It is located within the Caloundra urban centre directly southwest of the Caloundra CBD. In the 2021 census, Golden Beach had a population of 5,646 people.

The suburb is under threat of beach erosion as the tip of Bribie Island is washed away.

== Geography ==
Golden Beach is a coastal suburb with the Pumicestone Passage forming its eastern boundary. It is mostly fully developed with low density residential housing. A canal from the passage passes through the suburb from east to west leading into the canal developments of the neighbouring suburb of Pelican Waters.

The long sandspit at the northern tip of Bribie Island protects Golden Beach from the Coral Sea. However, this section of the Pumicestone Passage is very narrow and very shallow (less than 2 metres (6 ft 7 in)) with shifting sand and mud banks, which makes the northern sandspit highly dynamic in shape through natural processes of sand/mud buildup and erosion. During storms, waves may cross over the sandspit from the Coral Sea into the Pumicestone Passage, with the potential to break through the sandspit to create new entrances to Pumicestone Passage. The creation of new entrances would impact on Golden Beach and Pelican Waters, which would then be exposed more directly to the stronger wave action of the Coral Sea as opposed to the calmer waters of the Pumicestone Passage. In December 2020, wild weather began creating channels from the ocean through the northern sandspit into Pumicestone Passage.

== History ==
Settlement of Golden Beach dates from the late 19th century, with land used mainly for farming and grazing. Development of the suburb started from the 1950s, with rapid growth from the 1960s into the 1980s. The suburb was named by the Caloundra Golden Beach Ltd, the developers of the area.

Golden Beach State School opened on 24 January 1983.

== Demographics ==
In the 2016 census, Golden Beach had a population of 5,575 people.

In the 2021 census, Golden Beach had a population of 5,646 people.

== Education ==
Golden Beach State School is a government primary (Prep–6) school for boys and girls at Gregory Street (26.8144°S 153.1168°E). In 2017, the school had an enrolment of 657 students with 51 teachers (44 full-time equivalent) and 33 non-teaching staff (23 full-time equivalent). It includes a special education program.

There are no secondary schools in Golden Beach; the nearest government secondary school is Caloundra State High School in neighbouring Caloundra to the north.
