= Bribie Island North =

Bribie Island North Queensland
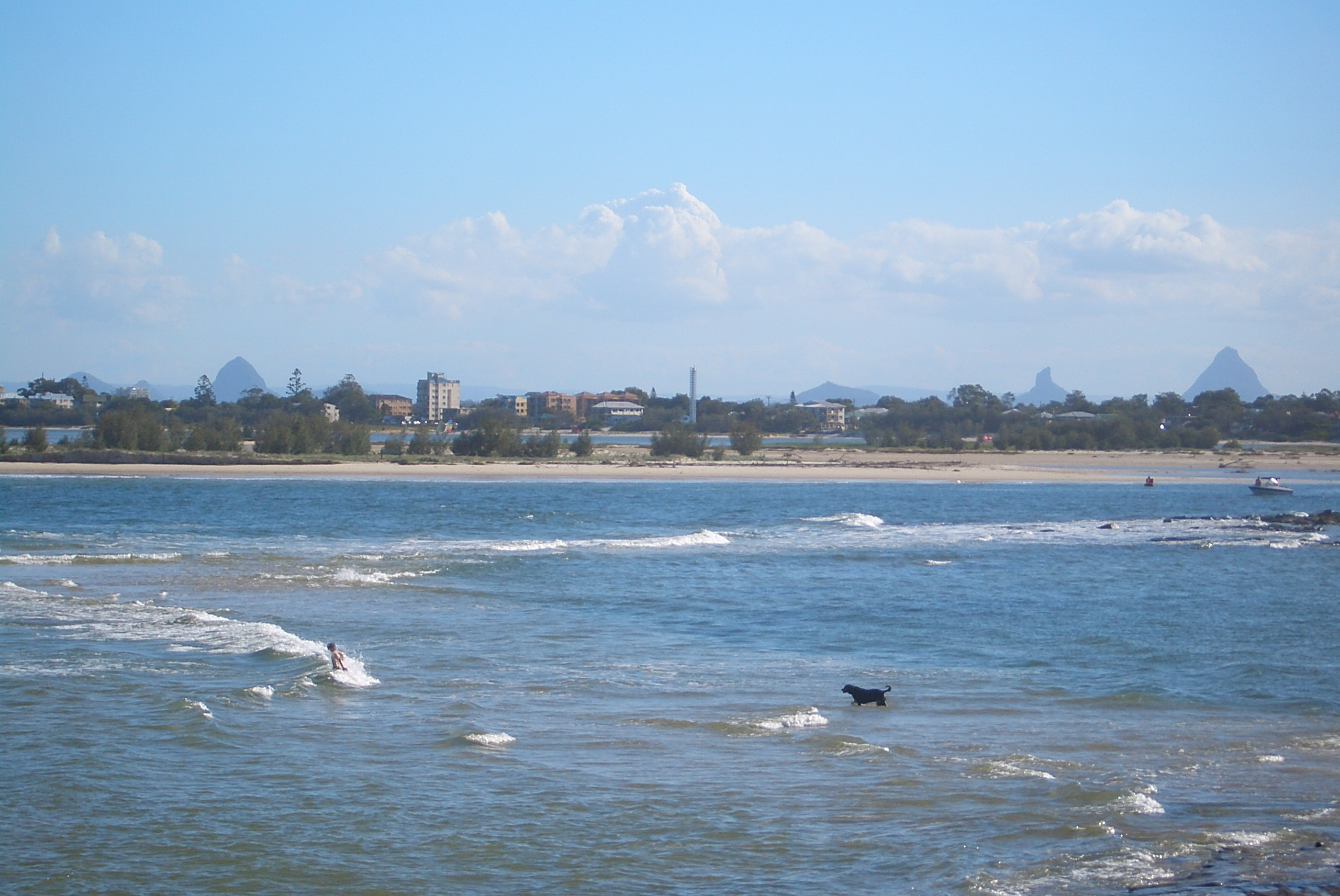
- The northern tip of Bribie Island is not far from Caloundra. The Glass House Mountains can be seen in the background

- Coordinates: 26.8827°S 153.1227°E
- Population: 0 (2021 census)
  - Density: 0.000/km^{2} (0.000/sq mi)
- Postcode(s): 4507
- Area: 46.6 km^{2} (18.0 sq mi)
- Time zone: AEST (UTC+10:00)
- Location: 23.5 km (15 mi) N of Bongaree; 44.4 km (28 mi) NE of Caboolture; 85.3 km (53 mi) S of Caloundra; 96.3 km (60 mi) NNE of Brisbane
- LGA(s): Sunshine Coast Region
- State electorate(s): Caloundra
- Federal division(s): Longman
Suburbs around Bribie Island North:
Golden Beach	Caloundra	Coral Sea
Coochin Creek	Bribie Island North	Coral Sea
Beerburrum	Welsby	Coral Sea

Bribie Island North is a locality on Bribie Island in the Sunshine Coast Region, Queensland, Australia. It is the only part of Bribie Island in the Sunshine Coast Region with all the rest of the Bribie Island being part of the City of Moreton Bay. In the 2021 census, Bribie Island North had "no people or a very low population".

== Geography ==
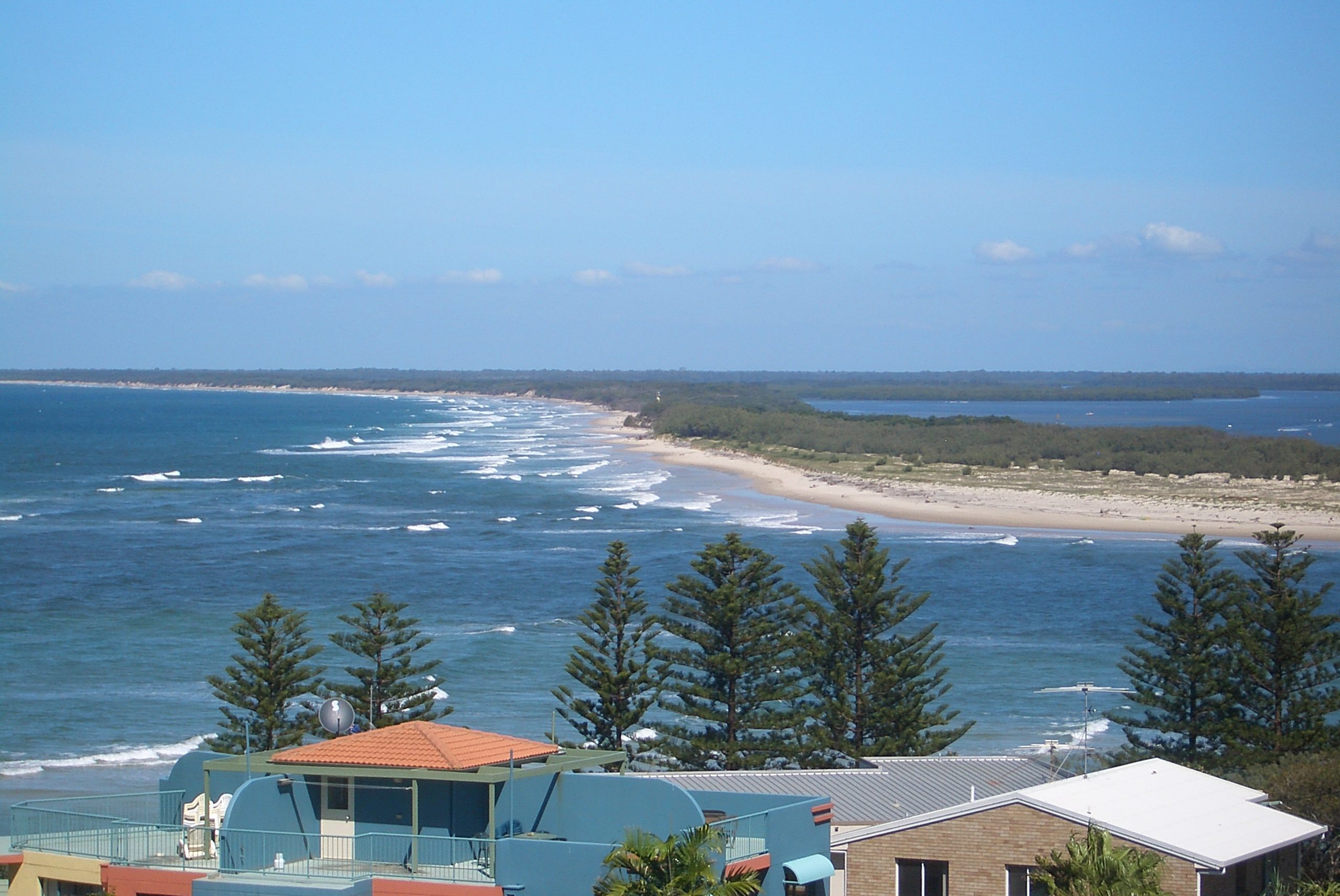
View from Caloundra, 2008

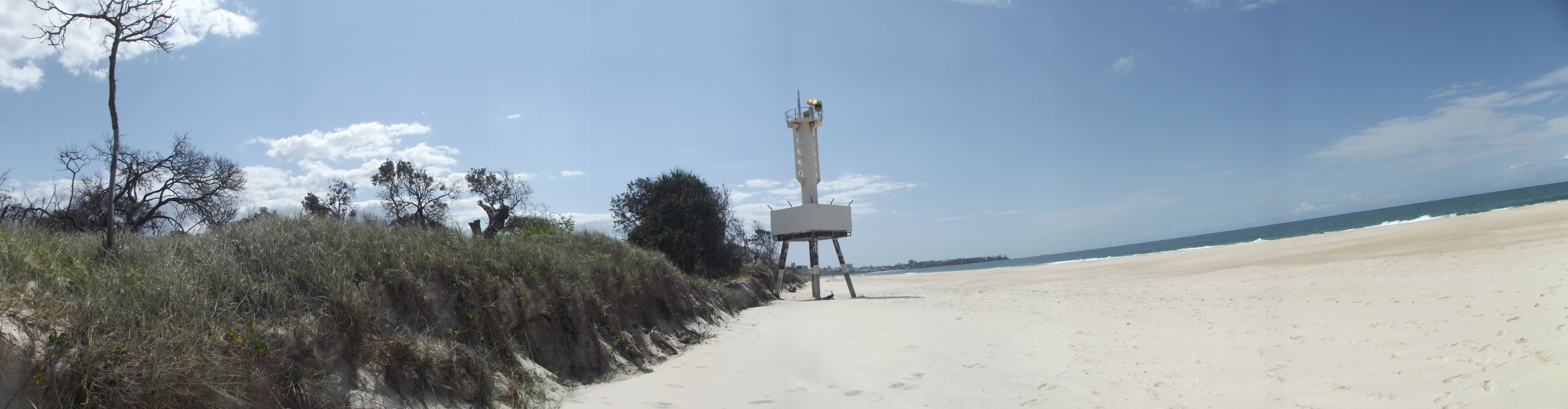
Northern spit light stick, 2015

As the name suggests, Bribie Island North is the northerly peninsula of Bribie Island. It lies very close to the mainland, narrowly separated by the Pumicestone Passage which forms the western border of the locality, while the eastern border is the Pacific Ocean. To the north, it tapers to a long low narrow sandspit. The locality is undeveloped land, most of it being within the Bribie Island National Park.

This section of the Pumicestone Passage is very narrow and very shallow (less than 2 metres (6 ft 7 in)) with shifting sand and mud banks, which makes the northern sandspit highly dynamic in shape through natural processes of sand/mud buildup and erosion. During storms, waves may cross over the sandspit from the Coral Sea into the Pumicestone Passage, with the potential to break through the sandspit to create new entrances to Pumicestone Passage. The creation of new entrances would impact on the Caloundra suburbs of Golden Beach and Pelican Waters which would then be exposed more directly to the stronger wave action of the Coral Sea as opposed to the calmer waters of the Pumicestone Passage.

Most of the locality is within the Bribie Island National Park with two sections of the Bribie Island State Forest in the south of the locality.

== History ==
In December 2020, wild weather began creating channels from the ocean through the northern sandspit into Pumicestone Passage. There was another breakthrough in 2022, while Cyclone Alfred in 2025 caused extensive erosion in the Lions Park area.

== Demographics ==
In the 2016 census, Bribie Island North had "no people or a very low population".

In the 2021 census, Bribie Island North had "no people or a very low population".

== Heritage listings ==
Bribie Island North has a number of heritage sites, including:

- Bribie Island Second World War Fortifications (26.8540°S 153.1292°E)

== Education ==
There are no schools in Bribie Island North. The nearest government primary school is Banksia Beach State School in Banksia Beach to the south. The nearest government secondary school is Bribie Island State High School in Bongaree to the south.
