= County of Lytton =

County of Lytton may refer to:

- County of Lytton, Queensland
- County of Lytton (South Australia)
