= County of Newcastle, Queensland =

Newcastle Queensland
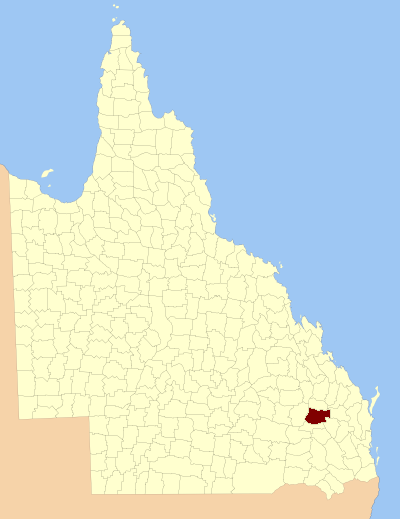
- Location within Queensland
Lands administrative divisions around Newcastle:
Fortescue	Wicklow	Bowen
Fortescue	Newcastle	Mackenzie
Auburn	Auburn	Boondooma

The County of Newcastle is a county (a cadastral division) in the Wide Bay–Burnett region of Queensland, Australia. On 7 March 1901, the Governor issued a proclamation legally dividing Queensland into counties under the Land Act 1897. Its schedule described Newcastle thus:

Bounded on the east by the counties of Mackenzie and Boondooma; on the south by the Main Dividing Range; on the west by the eastern watershed of the Dawson River; on the north by the northern boundaries of the leased parts of Auburn and Hawkwood Runs and the Auburn River from the confluence of Narayen Creek downwards to its junction with the Burnett River.

== Parishes ==
Newcastle is divided into parishes, as listed below:

Parish	LGA	Coordinates
Ballymore	Western Downs	25°44′S 150°30′E
Beeron	North Burnett	25°57′S 151°16′E
Brovinia	North Burnett	25°54′S 151°07′E
Cadarga	Western Downs	26°07′S 151°02′E
Chessborough	North Burnett	25°47′S 151°07′E
Coondarra	Western Downs	26°13′S 150°38′E
Currieside	North Burnett	25°56′S 150°56′E
Delembra	North Burnett	25°46′S 150°59′E
Derra	North Burnett	25°43′S 151°15′E
Goldsmith	Western Downs	26°09′S 150°26′E
Halloran	North Burnett	25°46′S 150°45′E
Hawkwood	North Burnett	25°51′S 150°52′E
Jarrah	Western Downs	26°12′S 150°50′E
Kilbeggan	Western Downs	25°54′S 150°29′E
Koko	North Burnett	25°59′S 150°49′E
Kragra	Western Downs	26°07′S 150°51′E
Maclaren	Western Downs	26°03′S 150°33′E
Monogorilby	North Burnett	26°01′S 151°04′E
Moonboonbury	North Burnett	25°49′S 151°15′E
Roscommon	Western Downs	26°04′S 150°42′E
Rosehall	Western Downs	25°52′S 150°40′E
Sujeewong	Western Downs	25°42′S 150°36′E
Warranna	Western Downs	26°01′S 150°24′E
