= Yellow Patch =

Yellow Patch may refer to:

- The yellow badge
- Colotis halimede, a butterfly in the genus Colotis
- Yellow Patch Light, a former lighthouse on Moreton Island, Australia
- Yellow Patch, a 2011 film by the Ugandan Asian artist Zarina Bhimji
