= County of Raglan =

Raglan Queensland
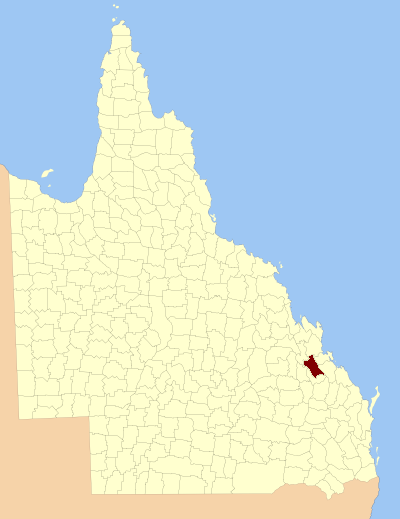
- Location within Queensland
Lands administrative divisions around Raglan:
Pakington	Livingstone	Deas Thompson
Ferguson	Raglan	Clinton
Pelham	Pelham	Pelham

The County of Raglan is a county (a cadastral division) in Queensland, Australia, located mostly within the Shire of Banana in Central Queensland. The county was first created in January 1854 by the office of the Colonial Secretary of New South Wales. On 7 March 1901, the Governor issued a proclamation legally dividing Queensland into counties under the Land Act 1897. Its schedule described Raglan thus:

Bounded on the south by the southern boundaries of Winterbourne, Callide and Prairie; on the west by the western boundaries of the parishes of Prairie, Spier, Earlsfield, Bundalba, Dundee, Gelobera and Calliungal; on the north by the county of Livingstone; and on the east by the counties of Livingstone, Deas Thompson, and Clinton.

== Parishes ==
Raglan is divided into parishes, as listed below:

Parish	LGA	Coordinates	Towns
Annandale	Banana	24°06′S 150°30′E	
Bundalba	Banana	24°02′S 150°14′E	
Bunerba	Banana	23°54′S 150°20′E	
Callide	Banana	24°22′S 150°43′E	
Calliungal	Rockhampton	23°41′S 150°22′E	Mount Morgan
Craiglands	Banana	24°04′S 150°39′E	
Don	Banana	24°03′S 150°23′E	
Dumgree	Banana	24°10′S 150°40′E	
Dundee	Banana	23°53′S 150°10′E	Dululu, Wowan
Earlsfield	Banana	24°11′S 150°23′E	Jambin
Gelobera	Rockhampton	23°46′S 150°28′E	
Manton	Banana	23°57′S 150°37′E	
Prairie	Banana	24°25′S 150°32′E	Biloela, Thangool
Spier	Banana	24°17′S 150°30′E	
Thalberg	Banana	24°18′S 150°41′E	
Ulogie	Banana	23°55′S 150°29′E	
Winterbourne	Gladstone	24°19′S 150°53′E	

== External links ==
- "Map of the County of Raglan". Queensland Government. 1919.
