= County of Deas Thompson =

Deas Thompson Queensland
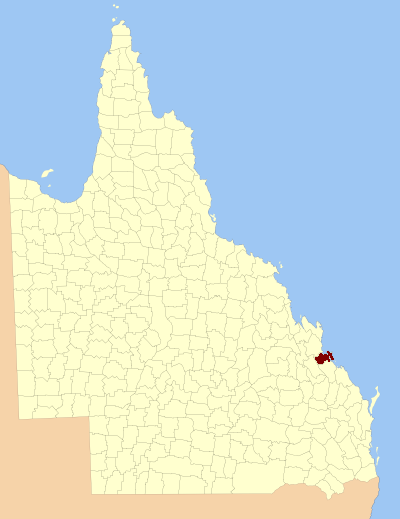
- Location within Queensland
Lands administrative divisions around Deas Thompson:
Livingstone	Livingstone	Coral Sea
Raglan	Deas Thompson	Coral Sea
Raglan	Clinton	Clinton

The County of Deas Thompson is a county (a cadastral division) in Queensland, Australia. It is situated between the cities of Gladstone and Rockhampton. The county is divided into civil parishes. The county was named for Edward Deas Thomson, a New South Wales politician, but the name was misspelt Thompson when applied to the county.

The county was created on 1 September 1855 by royal proclamation under the Waste Lands Australia Act 1846. On 7 March 1901, the Governor issued a proclamation legally dividing Queensland into counties under the Land Act 1897. Its schedule described Deas Thompson thus:

Bounded on the south by the county of Clinton; on the west by the western boundaries of the parishes of Raglan and Ultimo; on the north by the northern boundaries of the parishes of Ultimo, San Jose and Casuarina; and on the east by the Pacific Ocean,—including Curtis and Facing and other adjacent islands.

== Parishes ==
Deas Thompson is divided into parishes, as listed below:

Parish	LGA	Coordinates	Towns
Casuarina	Rockhampton	23°35′S 150°47′E	
Curtis	Gladstone	23°43′S 151°13′E	Southend (Curtis Island)
Langmorn	Gladstone	23°47′S 150°52′E	Ambrose, Mount Larcom, Raglan
Monte Christo	Gladstone	23°34′S 151°07′E	
Nolan	Gladstone	23°54′S 150°51′E	
Raglan	Gladstone	23°52′S 150°42′E	
Rundle	Gladstone	23°37′S 150°57′E	
San Jose	Rockhampton	23°42′S 150°45′E	Marmor
Targinie	Gladstone	23°43′S 151°05′E	
Ultimo	Rockhampton	23°43′S 150°36′E	Bajool

== External links ==
- "Map of the County of Deas Thompson". Queensland Government. 1910.
- "Map of the County of Deas Thompson". Queensland Government. 1921.
