= County of Cavendish =

Cavendish Queensland
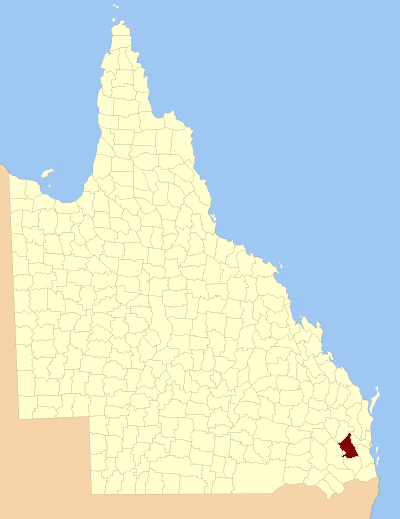
- Location within Queensland
Lands administrative divisions around Cavendish:
Fitzroy	Fitzroy	Canning
Aubigny	Cavendish	Canning
Aubigny	Churchill	Stanley

The County of Cavendish is a county (a cadastral division) in Queensland, Australia. Like all counties in Queensland, it is a non-functional administrative unit, that is used mainly for the purpose of registering land titles. The county includes the northern part of the Toowoomba Region and the western part of the Somerset Region. The county was officially named and bounded by the Governor in Council on 7 March 1901 under the Land Act 1897.

== Parishes ==
Cavendish is divided into parishes, listed as follows:

Parish	LGA	Coordinates	Towns	Parish map
Anduramba	Somerset	27°12′S 152°10′E		
Avoca	Somerset	26°37′S 152°12′E		
Biarra	Somerset	27°06′S 152°19′E	Toogoolawah	
Buaraba	Somerset	27°22′S 152°18′E		
Clarendon	Lockyer Valley	27°29′S 152°22′E		
Colinton	Somerset	26°52′S 152°15′E	Moore	
Cooyar	Toowoomba	26°55′S 151°55′E	Cooyar, Yarraman	
Cressbrook	Somerset	27°07′S 152°26′E		
Crows Nest	Toowoomba	27°15′S 152°03′E	Crows Nest	
Deongwar	Somerset	27°15′S 152°11′E		
Djuan	Toowoomba	27°08′S 151°56′E	Haden	
Emu Creek	Toowoomba	27°00′S 152°02′E		
England	Somerset	27°25′S 152°27′E	Coominya, Mount Tarampa	
Esk	Somerset	27°14′S 152°25′E	Esk	
Eskdale	Toowoomba	27°06′S 152°10′E		
Helidon	Lockyer Valley	27°30′S 152°07′E	Helidon	
Lockyer	Lockyer Valley	27°30′S 152°14′E	Grantham	
Murphy	Lockyer Valley	27°27′S 152°06′E		
Nukinenda	Somerset	27°01′S 152°11′E		
Ravensbourne	Toowoomba	27°21′S 152°08′E	Ravensbourne	
Taromeo	South Burnett	26°49′S 152°07′E	Benarkin, Blackbutt	1976
Wivenhoe	Somerset	27°21′S 152°32′E	Lake Wivenhoe	
