= County of Fitzroy, Queensland =

Fitzroy Queensland
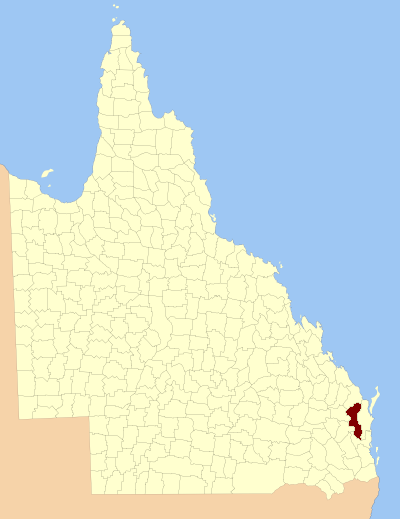
- Location within Queensland
Lands administrative divisions around Fitzroy:
Mackenzie	Mackenzie	Lennox
Boondooma	Fitzroy	Canning
Aubigny	Cavendish	Cavendish

The County of Fitzroy is a county (a cadastral division) in Queensland, Australia. Like all counties in Queensland, it is a non-functional administrative unit, that is used mainly for the purpose of registering land titles.

Fitzroy includes the eastern and central parts of the South Burnett Region and part of the former Shire of Kilkivan in the Gympie Region. It was named by the Surveyor-General of New South Wales in the 1850s after Charles Augustus FitzRoy, who served as the Governor of New South Wales from 1848 to 1855. The county was officially named and bounded by the Governor in Council on 7 March 1901 under the Land Act 1897. The county is unrelated to the Fitzroy River, which is centred on the County of Livingstone.

== Parishes ==
Fitzroy is divided into parishes, as listed below:

Parish	LGA	Coordinates	Towns
Barambah	South Burnett	26°19′S 152°05′E	Moffatdale
Booie	South Burnett	26°32′S 152°00′E	
Boonenne	South Burnett	26°35′S 151°44′E	Kingaroy, Inverlaw
Charlestown	South Burnett	26°25′S 151°56′E	
Cherbourg	South Burnett	26°19′S 151°56′E	Cherbourg
Cloyna	South Burnett	26°08′S 151°53′E	Cloyna
Coolabunia	South Burnett	26°37′S 151°59′E	Coolabunia
Gallangowan	Gympie	26°27′S 152°17′E	
Goomeribong	Gympie	26°12′S 152°04′E	Goomeri
Haly	South Burnett	26°46′S 151°37′E	
Johnstown	South Burnett	26°25′S 152°06′E	
Kunioon	South Burnett	26°41′S 151°52′E	Goodger
Manumbar	Gympie	26°22′S 152°18′E	Manumbar
McEuen	South Burnett	26°18′S 151°50′E	Wondai, Tingoora
Mondure	South Burnett	26°12′S 151°45′E	Hivesville
Murgon	South Burnett	26°13′S 151°55′E	Murgon
Nanango	South Burnett	26°41′S 151°59′E	Nanango
Neumgna	South Burnett	26°53′S 151°48′E	
Taabinga	South Burnett	26°41′S 151°42′E	Kumbia
Tarong	South Burnett	26°47′S 151°50′E	Brooklands
Tureen	South Burnett	26°50′S 151°40′E	
Wooroolin	South Burnett	26°28′S 151°46′E	Kingaroy, Wooroolin

== External links ==
- "Map of the County of Fitzroy". Queensland Government. 1909.
- "Map of the County of Fitzroy". Queensland Government. 1915.
- "Map of the County of Fitzroy". Queensland Government. 1921.
- "Map of the County of Fitzroy (revised)". Queensland Government. 1921.
