= County of Pelham =

Pelham Queensland
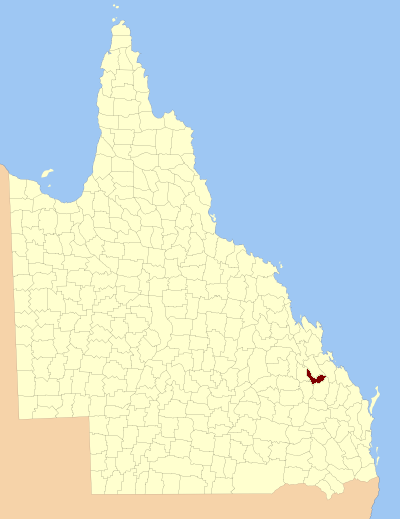
- Location within Queensland
Lands administrative divisions around Pelham:
Ferguson	Raglan	Clinton
Ferguson	Pelham	Rawbelle
Dawson	Rawbelle	Rawbelle

The County of Pelham is a county (a cadastral division) in Queensland, Australia, located in the Shire of Banana in Central Queensland. The county is divided into civil parishes. The county was created on 1 September 1855 by royal proclamation under the Waste Lands Australia Act 1846. On 7 March 1901, the Governor issued a proclamation legally dividing Queensland into counties under the Land Act 1897. Its schedule described Pelham thus:

Bounded on the north by the county of Raglan; on the east by the counties of Clinton and Rawbelle; on the south by the county of Rawbelle and the southern watershed of Scoria and Prospect Creeks; and on the west by the eastern watershed of the Dawson River.

== Parishes ==
Pelham is divided into parishes, as listed below:

Parish	LGA	Coordinates	Towns
Clifford	Banana	24°25′S 150°53′E	
Coreen	Banana	24°23′S 150°19′E	
Grevillea	Banana	24°39′S 150°47′E	Lawgi
Greycliffe	Banana	24°16′S 150°18′E	Goovigen
Kariboe	Banana	24°33′S 150°55′E	
Kooingal	Banana	24°31′S 150°27′E	
Kroombit	Banana	24°30′S 150°45′E	
Prospect	Banana	24°40′S 150°35′E	
Scoria	Banana	24°35′S 150°37′E	
Tiamby	Banana	24°40′S 150°28′E	

== External links ==
- "Map of the County of Pelham". Queensland Government. 1922.
