= County of Ferguson =

Ferguson Queensland
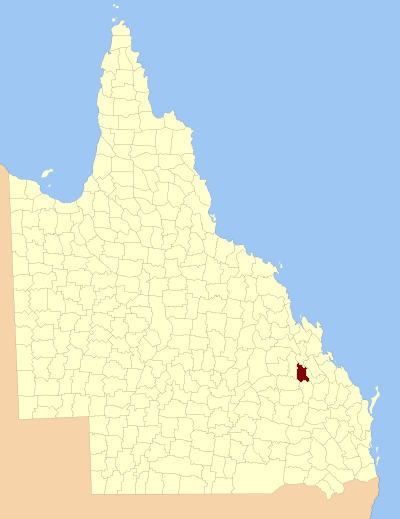
- Location within Queensland
Lands administrative divisions around Ferguson:
Kimberley	Pakington	Raglan
Kimberley	Ferguson	Pelham
Bauhinia	Dawson	Dawson

The County of Ferguson is a county (a cadastral division) in Queensland, Australia, located in the Shire of Banana in Central Queensland. The county is divided into civil parishes. The county was officially named and bounded by the Governor in Council on 7 March 1901 under the Land Act 1897.

== Parishes ==
Ferguson is divided into parishes, as listed below:

Parish	LGA	Coordinates	Towns
Banana	Banana	24°30′S 150°07′E	Banana
Barfield	Banana	24°34′S 150°15′E	Tarramba
Benleith	Banana	24°11′S 149°54′E	Baralaba
Capayan	Banana	24°28′S 149°56′E	
Cottenham	Banana	24°22′S 150°08′E	
Fairview	Banana	24°20′S 149°55′E	
Granville	Banana	24°10′S 150°03′E	Kokotungo
Moura	Banana	24°36′S 150°00′E	Moura
Neimen	Banana	24°28′S 150°15′E	
Olinda	Banana	24°02′S 149°54′E	
Woolein	Banana	24°11′S 150°10′E	Rannes
