= County of Boondooma =

Boondooma Queensland
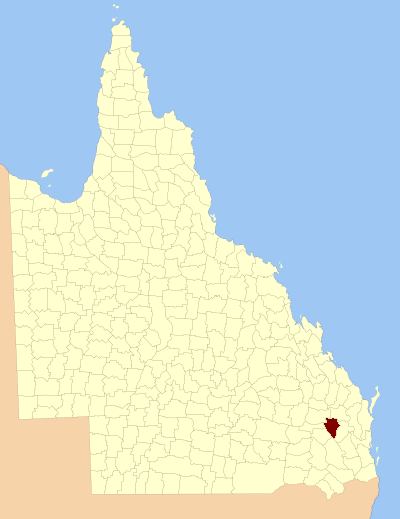
- Location within Queensland
Lands administrative divisions around Boondooma:
| Newcastle | Mackenzie | Mackenzie |
| Auburn | Boondooma | Fitzroy |
| Lytton | Aubigny | Fitzroy |

The County of Boondooma is a county (a cadastral division) in the Wide Bay–Burnett region of Queensland, Australia. It was named and bounded by the Governor in Council on 7 March 1901 under the Land Act 1897.

== Parishes ==
Boondooma is divided into parishes, as listed below:

| Parish | LGA | Coordinates | Towns |
|---|---|---|---|
| Ballogie | South Burnett | 26°19′S 151°35′E | |
| Boondooma | South Burnett | 26°14′S 151°09′E | Boondooma |
| Burrandowan | South Burnett | 26°40′S 151°30′E | |
| Chahpingah | South Burnett | 26°29′S 151°19′E | Durong |
| Cushnie | South Burnett | 26°17′S 151°43′E | |
| Dangore | South Burnett | 26°28′S 151°35′E | |
| Durong | South Burnett | 26°20′S 151°12′E | |
| Jua | South Burnett | 26°19′S 151°23′E | |
| Lawson | South Burnett | 26°13′S 151°23′E | |
| Mannuem | South Burnett | 26°25′S 151°28′E | |
| Okeden | South Burnett | 26°06′S 151°30′E | |
| Peroone | South Burnett | 26°24′S 151°26′E | |
| Proston | South Burnett | 26°11′S 151°34′E | Proston |
| Waringa | South Burnett | 26°06′S 151°21′E | |
| Weir Weir | South Burnett | 26°04′S 151°11′E | |

== External links ==
- "Map of the County of Boondooma". Queensland Government. 1923.
