= County of Yarrol =

Yarrol Queensland
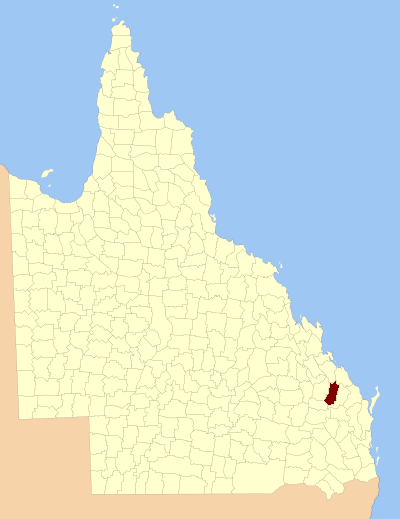
- Location within Queensland
Lands administrative divisions around Yarrol:
Rawbelle	Clinton	Flinders
Rawbelle	Yarrol	Bowen
Wicklow	Bowen	Bowen

The County of Yarrol is a county (a cadastral division) in Queensland, Australia, located in the Wide Bay–Burnett region to the west of Bundaberg. On 7 March 1901, the Governor issued a proclamation legally dividing Queensland into counties under the Land Act 1897. Its schedule described Yarrol thus:

Bounded on the east by the county of Bowen; on the south and west by the Burnett River upwards to the western watershed of Three Moon Creek, by that watershed northerly to the southern watershed of Glassford Creek; and on the north by the southern boundary of the parish of Bompa.

== Parishes ==
Yarrol is divided into parishes, as listed below:

Parish	LGA	Coordinates	Towns
Bania	North Burnett	24°57′S 151°30′E	
Baywulla	North Burnett	25°05′S 151°25′E	Yarrol
Borilla	North Burnett	24°46′S 151°26′E	
Cannindah	North Burnett	24°52′S 151°16′E	Bancroft
Cynthia	North Burnett	25°11′S 151°09′E	Abercorn
Dalgangal	North Burnett	25°13′S 151°16′E	
Hollywell	North Burnett	25°21′S 151°09′E	Eidsvold
Lochaber	North Burnett	25°25′S 151°16′E	
Malmoe	North Burnett	25°29′S 151°13′E	Riverleigh
Minerva	Bundaberg	24°38′S 151°27′E	
Molangul	Bundaberg	24°47′S 151°34′E	
Mundowran	North Burnett	25°33′S 151°19′E	Mundubbera
Mungy	North Burnett	25°17′S 151°26′E	
New Cannindah	North Burnett	24°43′S 151°16′E	Kalpowar
Nour Nour	North Burnett	25°10′S 151°27′E	
Reid	North Burnett	25°25′S 151°24′E	Gurgeena
Tellebang	North Burnett	25°03′S 151°14′E	
Yarrol	North Burnett	24°54′S 151°25′E	

== External links ==
- "Map of the County of Yarrol". Queensland Government. 1922.
