= County of Auburn =

Auburn Queensland
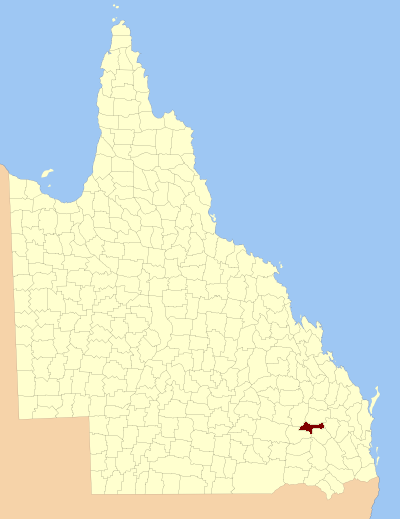
- Location within Queensland
Lands administrative divisions around Auburn:
Fortescue	Newcastle	Newcastle
Bulwer	Auburn	Boondooma
Bulwer	Lytton	Lytton

County of Auburn map, 2 miles to an inch, 1922

The County of Auburn is a county (a cadastral division) in the Darling Downs region of Queensland, Australia. Much of its area is within the Barakula State Forest. It was named and bounded by the Governor in Council on 7 March 1901 under the Land Act 1897.

== Parishes ==
Auburn is divided into parishes, as listed below:

Parish	LGA	Coordinates
Athlone	Western Downs	26°19′S 150°51′E
Ballon	Western Downs	26°25′S 150°51′E
Bartsch	Western Downs	26°30′S 150°07′E
Bembil	Western Downs	26°14′S 150°57′E
Binkey	Western Downs	26°21′S 150°11′E
Burraburri	Western Downs	26°25′S 151°06′E
Delger	Western Downs	26°19′S 151°03′E
Hookswood	Western Downs	26°29′S 150°21′E
Macdonald	Western Downs	26°21′S 150°40′E
Malcolm	Western Downs	26°20′S 150°29′E
Pelham	Western Downs	26°22′S 150°20′E
Quandong	Western Downs	26°14′S 150°18′E
Wongongera	Western Downs	26°32′S 150°31′E
