= County of Rawbelle =

Rawbelle Queensland
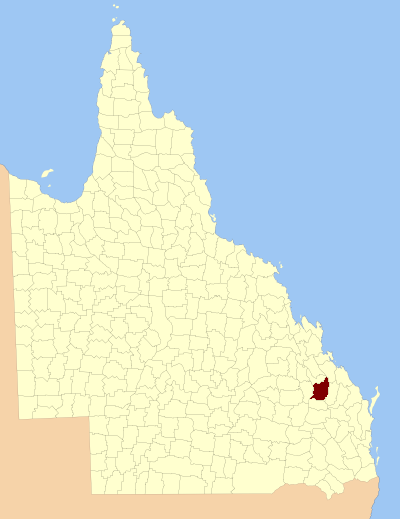
- Location within Queensland
Lands administrative divisions around Rawbelle:
Pelham	Pelham	Clinton
Dawson	Rawbelle	Yarrol
Wicklow	Wicklow	Yarrol

The County of Rawbelle is a county (a cadastral division) in Queensland, Australia, located in the Wide Bay–Burnett region. On 7 March 1901, the Governor issued a proclamation legally dividing Queensland into counties under the Land Act 1897. Its schedule described Rawbelle thus:

Bounded on the south by the county of Wicklow; on the west by the eastern watershed of the Dawson River; on the north by the northern watersheds of Rawbelle River and Three Moon Creek; and on the east by the county of Yarrol.

== Parishes ==
Rawbelle is divided into parishes, as listed below:

Parish	LGA	Coordinates	Towns
Bailey	North Burnett	24°54′S 151°04′E	Monto, Mulgildie
Bingmann	North Burnett	24°48′S 150°53′E	
Calrossie	North Burnett	25°14′S 150°35′E	
Cania	North Burnett	24°32′S 151°00′E	
Clonmel	North Burnett	24°43′S 151°04′E	
Coominglah	North Burnett	24°55′S 150°56′E	
Coppin	North Burnett	24°48′S 151°04′E	Moonford, Mungungo
Culcraigie	North Burnett	25°16′S 151°01′E	
Harrami	North Burnett	24°47′S 150°42′E	
Monal	North Burnett	24°34′S 151°06′E	
Montour	North Burnett	24°56′S 150°40′E	
Mungon	North Burnett	25°07′S 150°58′E	Wuruma Dam
Rawbelle	North Burnett	24°59′S 150°49′E	
Selene	North Burnett	25°02′S 151°06′E	
Telemark	North Burnett	25°18′S 150°50′E	
Tireen	North Burnett	25°10′S 150°41′E	
Trevethan	North Burnett	25°05′S 150°39′E	
Yule	North Burnett	25°10′S 150°51′E	
