= County of Fraser =

Fraser Queensland
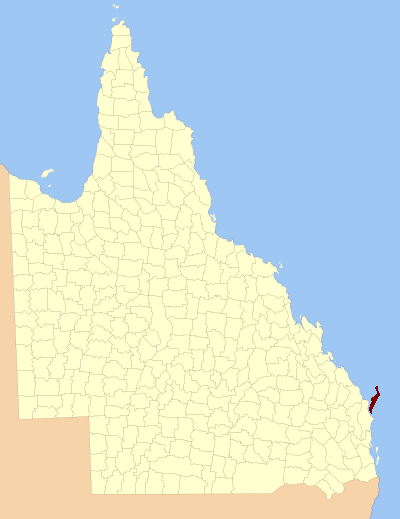
- Location within Queensland

The County of Fraser is one of 322 counties (a cadastral division) of Queensland, Australia, in the Wide Bay–Burnett region, which consists Fraser Island and some satellite islands off its southwestern coast. It was established on 7 March 1901 under the Land Act 1897, and borders County of March, which lies mainly on the Queensland mainland, but also includes Big Woody Island and other islands in the northern Great Sandy Strait.

== Parishes ==
Fraser Island is divided into six parishes, listed as follows, from North to South (a seventh parish of County of Fraser, namely Dayman, is not located on Fraser Island, but on Big Woody Island and nearby smaller islands):

Parish	Coordinates
Carree	24°48′S 153°13′E
Wathumba	25°00′S 153°19′E
Bowarrady	25°07′S 153°15′E
Moonbi	25°15′S 153°08′E
Poyungan	25°27′S 153°05′E
Talboor	25°40′S 153°02′E

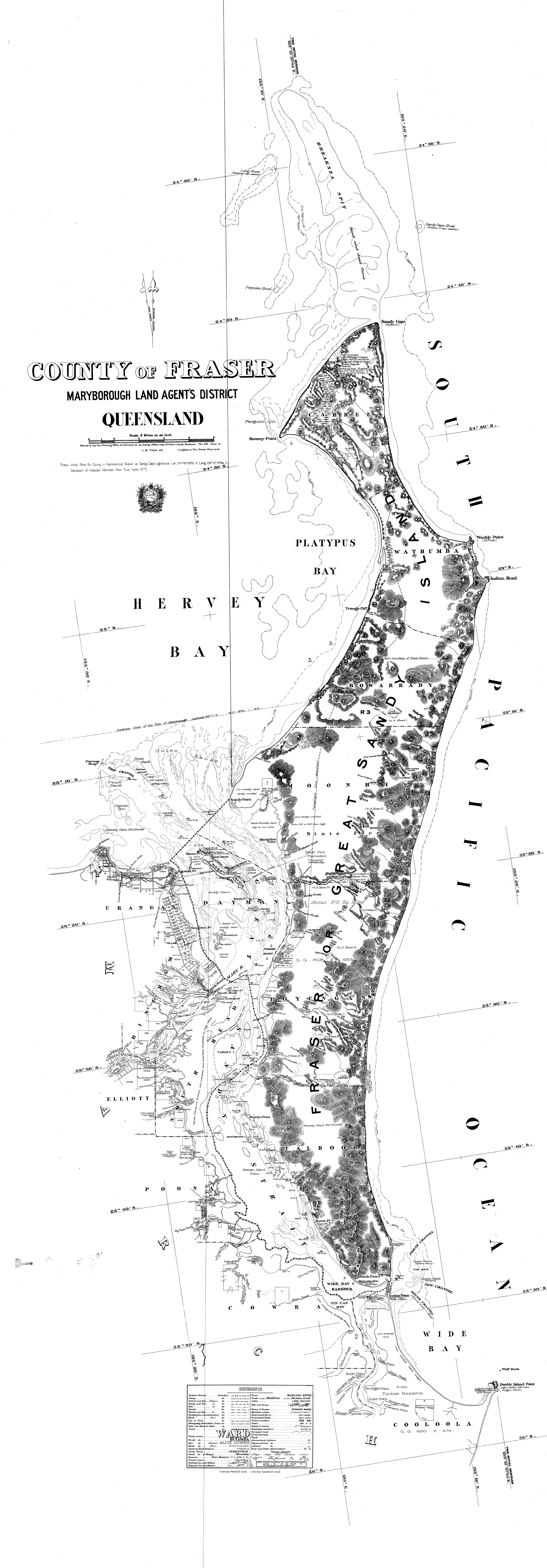
1913 parish map (north sheet)

Some nearshore islands off the southern west coast and thus in the Great Sandy Strait also belong to the County of Fraser, specifically to its southernmost parish, Talboor. Among them are Slain Island, Tooth Island, Roundbush Island, Moonboom Island, Gardner Island, Dream Island, Stewart Island, and the Reef Islands.
