= County of Derby, Queensland =

Derby Queensland
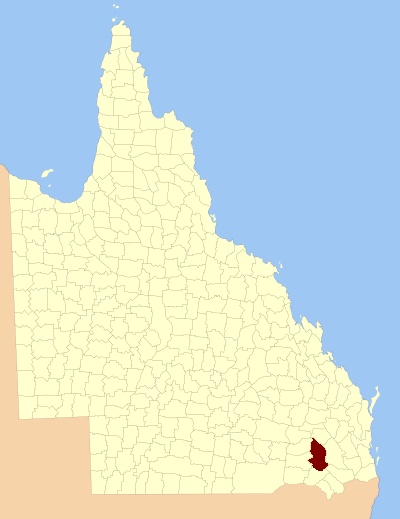
- Location within Queensland
Lands administrative divisions around Derby:
Bulwer	Lytton	Lytton
Rogers	Derby	Aubigny
Pring	Marsh	Merivale

The County of Derby is a county (a cadastral division) in the Darling Downs region of Queensland, Australia. It was named and bounded by the Governor in Council on 7 March 1901 under the Land Act 1897.

== Parishes ==
Derby is divided into parishes, as listed below:

Parish	LGA	Coordinates	Towns
Bingeyrang	Western Downs	27°40′S 150°31′E	
Boondandilla	Goondiwindi	27°50′S 150°38′E	
Braemar	Western Downs	27°10′S 150°49′E	
Brigalow	Toowoomba	27°50′S 151°04′E	
Bulli	Toowoomba	27°58′S 150°50′E	
Cecil Plains	Toowoomba	27°34′S 151°08′E	Cecil Plains
Daandine	Western Downs	27°17′S 151°00′E	Ducklo
Domville	Toowoomba	27°52′S 151°16′E	Millmerran
Dunmore	Toowoomba	27°37′S 150°58′E	
Durabilla	Western Downs	27°29′S 150°45′E	
Ewer	Western Downs	26°52′S 150°37′E	
Greenbank	Western Downs	27°09′S 151°05′E	
Halliford	Western Downs	27°25′S 150°57′E	
Hill	Western Downs	27°16′S 151°09′E	Nandi
Hunter	Western Downs	26°56′S 150°46′E	
Kogan	Western Downs	27°03′S 150°47′E	Kogan
Malara	Western Downs	27°06′S 150°37′E	
Marmadua	Western Downs	27°27′S 150°35′E	
Miles	Western Downs	27°05′S 150°57′E	
Montrose	Western Downs	27°02′S 150°38′E	
Mundagai	Western Downs	27°44′S 150°29′E	
Myra	Western Downs	27°13′S 150°32′E	
Perth	Western Downs	27°14′S 150°41′E	
Stretchworth	Western Downs	27°31′S 150°57′E	
Vickery	Western Downs	27°21′S 150°35′E	
Vignoles	Toowoomba	27°50′S 150°50′E	
Waar Waar	Western Downs	27°37′S 150°43′E	
Waggaba	Western Downs	27°42′S 150°43′E	
Weale	Toowoomba	27°25′S 151°10′E	
Weranga	Western Downs	27°20′S 150°46′E	Weranga
Western Creek	Toowoomba	27°59′S 151°05′E	
Wilkie	Toowoomba	27°43′S 150°58′E	
Yandilla	Toowoomba	27°44′S 151°11′E	Kurrowah

== External links ==
- "Map of the County of Derby (sheet 1)". Queensland Government. 1921.
- "Map of the County of Derby (sheet 2)". Queensland Government. 1921.
