= County of Fortescue =

Fortescue Queensland
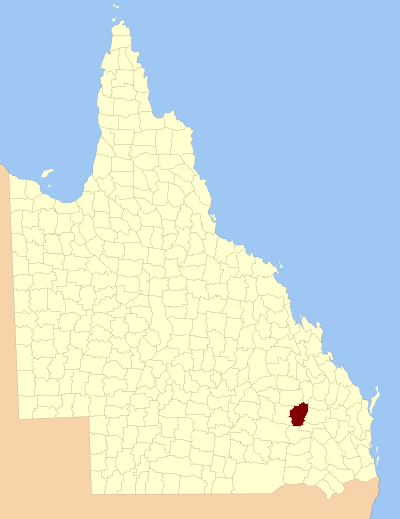
- Location within Queensland
Lands administrative divisions around Fortescue:
Labouchere	Dawson	Wicklow
Aberdeen	Fortescue	Newcastle
Aberdeen	Bulwer	Auburn

The County of Fortescue is a county (a cadastral division) in Central Queensland, Queensland, Australia. Much of its area is within the Barakula State Forest. It was named and bounded by the Governor in Council on 7 March 1901 under the Land Act 1897.

== Parishes ==
Fortescue is divided into parishes, as listed below:

Parish	LGA	Coordinates	Towns
Ardah	Banana	25°51′S 149°39′E	
Bentley	Banana	25°42′S 150°02′E	
Biloela	Banana	25°46′S 150°10′E	
Bockemurry	Banana	25°46′S 150°20′E	
Bundi	Western Downs	25°58′S 149°40′E	
Bungaban	Western Downs	25°57′S 150°09′E	
Carraba	Banana	25°47′S 149°45′E	
Cherwondah	Western Downs	26°15′S 150°00′E	Guluguba
Cockatoo	Banana	25°37′S 150°02′E	
Conloi	Western Downs	26°20′S 149°55′E	
Cooaga	Western Downs	26°06′S 150°15′E	
Dawson	Banana	25°33′S 150°20′E	
Downfall	Western Downs	26°14′S 150°07′E	
Glebe	Banana	25°32′S 150°02′E	
Hinchley	Western Downs	26°08′S 149°44′E	
Jerrard	Western Downs	26°02′S 150°04′E	
Juandah	Western Downs	26°08′S 149°50′E	
Juliet	Western Downs	25°52′S 150°02′E	
Kera	Banana	25°44′S 149°54′E	
Kroomgah	Banana	25°40′S 150°18′E	
Langhorne	Western Downs	25°51′S 149°54′E	
McLeod	Banana	25°35′S 150°12′E	
Mundell	Western Downs	25°56′S 150°17′E	
Price	Banana	25°28′S 150°12′E	
Rochedale	Western Downs	25°58′S 149°50′E	Grosmont
Taroom	Banana	25°38′S 149°51′E	Taroom
Wandoan	Western Downs	26°08′S 150°00′E	Wandoan
Woleebee	Maranoa	26°18′S 149°45′E	

== External links ==
- "Map of the County of Fortescue". Queensland Government. 1923.
- "Map of the County of Fortescue". Queensland Government. 1931.
