= County of Aubigny =

Aubigny Queensland
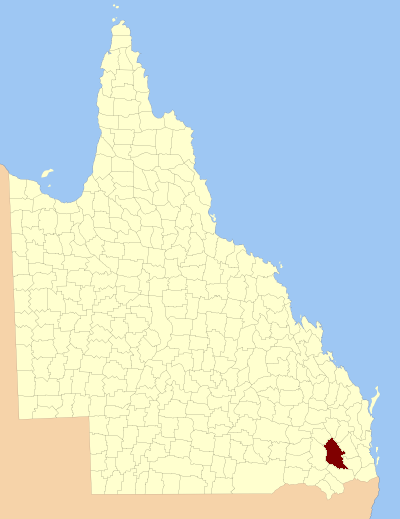
- Location within Queensland
Lands administrative divisions around Aubigny:
Lytton	Boondooma	Fitzroy
Derby	Aubigny	Cavendish
Derby	Merivale	Churchill

The County of Aubigny is a county (a cadastral division) in Queensland, Australia. Like all counties in Queensland, it is a non-functional administrative unit, that is used mainly for the purpose of registering land titles. The county lies between 151°E and 152°E longitude, and it covers the Toowoomba Region and the Dalby part of the Western Downs Region, The county was named by the Surveyor-General of New South Wales in 1850, possibly to honour the Earl of Arundel who had a long association with the name Aubigny. The area was officially named and bounded by the Governor in Council on 7 March 1901 under the Land Act 1897.

== Parishes ==
Aubigny is divided into parishes, listed as follows:

Parish	LGA	Coordinates	Towns / Localities	Maps
Beauaraba	Toowoomba	27°41′S 151°35′E	Pittsworth	
Bowenville	Toowoomba	27°19′S 151°28′E	Bowenville	
Cambooya	Toowoomba	27°42′S 151°51′E	Cambooya	
Cecil Plains	Toowoomba	27°38′S 151°22′E	Brookstead, Cecil Plains	
Clifton	Toowoomba	27°55′S 152°00′E	Clifton	
Cumkillenbar	Western Downs	27°02′S 151°23′E	Kaimkillenbun	
Dalby	Western Downs	27°09′S 151°18′E	Dalby	
Douglas	Toowoomba	27°19′S 151°59′E		
Drayton	Toowoomba	27°35′S 151°56′E	Toowoomba, Drayton	
East Prairie	Toowoomba	27°34′S 151°27′E		
Elphinstone	Toowoomba	27°57′S 151°52′E		
Eton Vale	Toowoomba	27°39′S 151°53′E		
Felton	Toowoomba	27°51′S 151°40′E		
Geham	Toowoomba	27°24′S 152°00′E	Geham, Hampton	
Goombungee	Toowoomba	27°17′S 151°53′E	Goombungee	
Gowrie	Toowoomba	27°32′S 151°53′E		
Haldon	Toowoomba	27°49′S 152°02′E		
Hodgson	Toowoomba	27°48′S 151°50′E		
Irvingdale	Western Downs	27°09′S 151°27′E		
Isaac	Toowoomba	27°30′S 151°48′E	Kingsthorpe	
Jimbour	Western Downs	27°00′S 151°16′E	Jimbour	
Jondaryan	Toowoomba	27°23′S 151°28′E	Jondaryan	
King	Toowoomba	27°21′S 151°48′E		
Macalister	Western Downs	27°04′S 151°08′E	Macalister	
Maida Hill	Western Downs	26°54′S 151°30′E	Bell	
Meringandan	Toowoomba	27°26′S 151°50′E	Meringandan	
Milton	Toowoomba	27°10′S 151°46′E		
Moola	Western Downs	27°03′S 151°32′E		
Motley	Toowoomba	27°35′S 151°37′E	Motley	1941 1976
Myall	Western Downs	27°09′S 151°10′E		
North Branch	Toowoomba	27°48′S 151°33′E		
Pilton	Toowoomba	27°54′S 152°07′E	Pilton	
Ramsay	Toowoomba	27°44′S 151°58′E		
Rolleston	Toowoomba	27°43′S 151°42′E	Pittsworth, Southbrook	
Rosalie	Toowoomba	27°09′S 151°37′E		
St Ruth	Western Downs	27°24′S 151°17′E	St Ruth	
Stephens	Toowoomba	27°56′S 151°46′E		
Tabletop	Toowoomba	27°57′S 152°00′E		
Tooth	Toowoomba	27°53′S 151°49′E	Nobby	
Toowoomba	Toowoomba	27°29′S 151°56′E	Charlton, Gowrie Jn, Highfields	
Watts	Toowoomba	27°22′S 151°40′E	Oakey	
West Prairie	Toowoomba	27°28′S 151°22′E		
Westbrook	Toowoomba	27°35′S 151°45′E	Westbrook, Biddeston	
Wienholt	Western Downs	27°13′S 151°26′E		
Yandilla	Toowoomba	27°43′S 151°20′E		
Young	Toowoomba	27°17′S 151°23′E		
