= County of March =

March
- Cadastral division
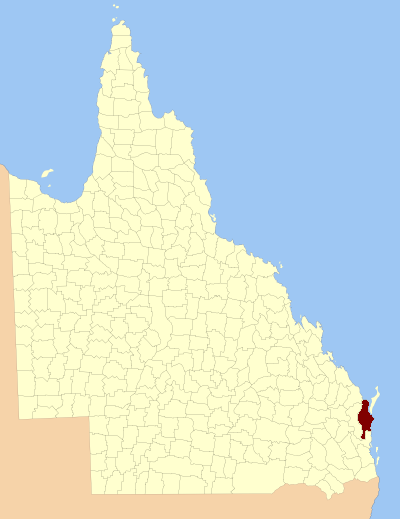
- Location within Queensland
- Country: Australia
- State: Queensland
Lands administrative divisions around March
Cook	Coral Sea	Coral Sea
Lennox	March	Fraser
Canning	Canning	Coral Sea

The County of March is a county (a cadastral division) in Queensland, Australia. The county consists of the Noosa area, plus the eastern parts of the Gympie and Fraser Coast regions.

== History ==
March was first created by an Order in Council by the Governor of New South Wales on 30 December 1848. It was named by the Surveyor-General in honour of a medical practitioner based in the area. The county was described in the following terms:

County of March, containing about 1925 square miles. Bounded on the south by Moroochydore river (sic) to its source, thence by the range dividing the system of the river Mary from that of the Brisbane, to the main source of the Mary; on the west by the Mary; on the north-east by the coast of Wide Bay; and on the east by the seacoast to the mouth of the Moroochydore.

On 7 March 1901, the Governor of Queensland proclaimed new boundaries under the Land Act 1897, which were described as follows:

Bounded on the south by the county of Canning; on the west by the western boundaries of the parishes of Kenilworth, Tuchekoi, Traveston, Gympie, Curra, Gutchy, Gundiah, Tiaro, Young, Maryborough, Wallibum and Vernon; on the north by the Pacific Ocean and on the east by Great Sandy Strait and the Pacific Ocean.

== Parishes ==
March is divided into parishes, as listed below:

Parish	LGA	Coordinates	Towns
Bidwill	Fraser Coast	25°38′S 152°42′E	
Bingham	Fraser Coast	25°24′S 152°52′E	
Como	Noosa	26°10′S 153°00′E	
Conondale	Sunshine Coast	26°45′S 152°46′E	
Cooloola	Gympie	25°58′S 153°06′E	Rainbow Beach
Cowra	Fraser Coast	25°47′S 152°56′E	Tinnanbar
Curra	Gympie	26°02′S 152°36′E	Curra
Dayman	Fraser Coast	25°20′S 152°58′E	(Big Woody Island)
Elliott	Fraser Coast	25°31′S 152°48′E	
Goomboorian	Gympie	26°05′S 152°45′E	
Gundiah	Fraser Coast	25°50′S 152°37′E	Bauple
Gutchy	Gympie	25°55′S 152°36′E	Theebine
Gympie	Gympie	26°08′S 152°42′E	Gympie
Kenilworth	Sunshine Coast	26°34′S 152°48′E	Kenilworth
Laguna	Noosa	26°17′S 153°00′E	
Maleny	Sunshine Coast	26°40′S 152°48′E	Maleny
Maryborough	Fraser Coast	25°30′S 152°42′E	Maryborough
Neerdie	Gympie	25°57′S 152°44′E	
Noosa	Noosa	26°17′S 152°56′E	Tewantin, Boreen Point
Poona	Fraser Coast	25°38′S 152°52′E	Boonooroo
South Head	Fraser Coast	25°30′S 152°55′E	
Tagigan	Gympie	26°09′S 152°51′E	
Tahiti	Fraser Coast	25°46′S 152°47′E	
Tewantin	Noosa	26°24′S 152°59′E	Cooroy
Tiaro	Fraser Coast	25°45′S 152°37′E	Tiaro
Tinana	Fraser Coast	25°34′S 152°40′E	Tinana
Toolara	Gympie	25°58′S 152°56′E	Tin Can Bay
Traveston	Gympie	26°17′S 152°44′E	Traveston
Tuchekoi	Gympie	26°24′S 152°48′E	Pomona
Ulirrah	Gympie	25°54′S 152°49′E	
Urangan	Fraser Coast	25°20′S 152°52′E	Hervey Bay South
Vernon	Fraser Coast	25°20′S 152°42′E	Hervey Bay North
Walliebum	Fraser Coast	25°26′S 152°44′E	Aldershot
Weyba	Noosa	26°26′S 153°03′E	Noosaville, Peregian Beach
Womalah	Gympie	26°06′S 153°00′E	
Woondum	Gympie	26°16′S 152°48′E	Cooran, Kin Kin
Young	Fraser Coast	25°38′S 152°38′E	
