= Pelican Waters, Queensland =

Pelican Waters
- Suburb
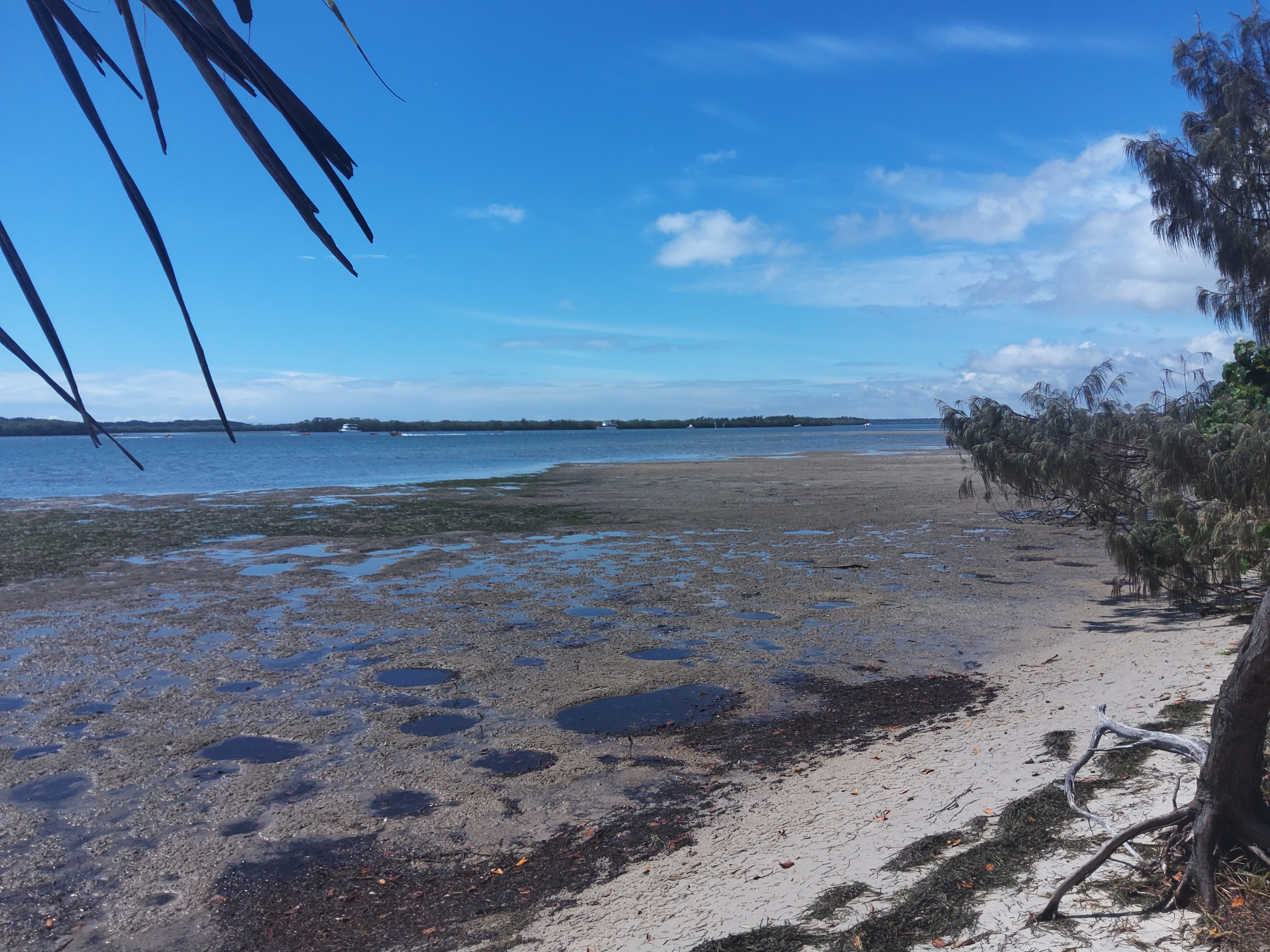
- Pumicestone Passage beach, 2021

- Interactive map of Pelican Waters
- Coordinates: 26.8325°S 153.1002°E
- Country: Australia
- State: Queensland
- City: Caloundra
- LGA: Sunshine Coast Region
- Location: 7.7 km (4.8 mi) SW of Caloundra; 96.0 km (59.7 mi) N of Brisbane
- Established: 1995

Government
  - State electorate: Caloundra
  - Federal division: Fisher

Area
  - Total: 8.4 km^{2} (3.2 sq mi)

Population
  - Total: 7,393 (2021 census)
  - Density: 880/km^{2} (2,279/sq mi)
- Time zone: UTC+10:00 (AEST)
- Postcode: 4551
- County: Canning
- Parish: Bribie
Suburbs around Pelican Waters
Caloundra West	Caloundra West	Golden Beach
Bells Creek	Pelican Waters	Golden Beach
Bells Creek	Coochin Creek	Coochin Creek

Pelican Waters is a suburb of Caloundra in the Sunshine Coast Region, Queensland, Australia. In the 2021 census, Pelican Waters had a population of 7,393 people.

== Geography ==
Pelican Waters is located within the Caloundra urban centre 7.7 kilometres (5 mi) by road southwest of Caloundra CBD.

Pelican Waters is bounded to the north and north-west loosely by unnamed creeks, to the south-west by Bells Creek (North Branch), and to the south by Bells Creek (26.8533°S 153.0934°E).

The northern and eastern parts of the suburb are predominantly canal estates (26.8216°S 153.1080°E).

== History ==
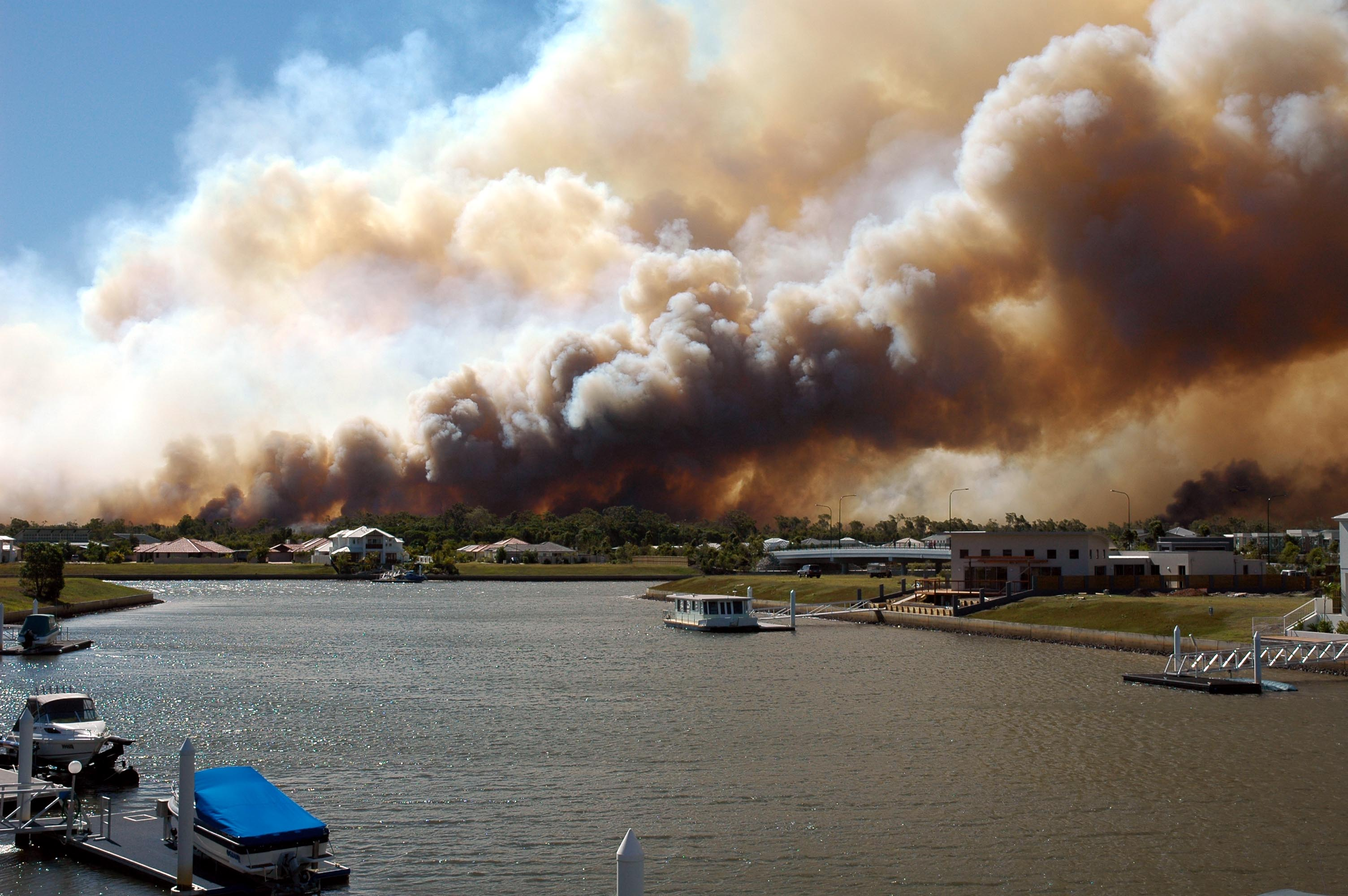
Bush fires, 2006

In 1881 explorer William Landsborough acquired land in the area now Pelican Waters and Golden Beach, calling his property Loch Lamerough. He died at this property in 1886. In 1946, 2,372 acres (960 ha) of Landsborough's property was sold to cover unpaid rates. It was purchased by real estate agent Roy Henzell. In 1989 Henzell's agency commences the construction of a canal estate from the wetlands of the Bell Creek estuary to create Pelican Waters.

The suburb named and bounded on 8 December 1995. The name Pelican Waters was proposed by the land developer.

Caloundra City School opened on 27 January 2005.

== Demographics ==
In the 2016 census, Pelican Waters had a population of 6,277 people.

In the 2021 census, Pelican Waters had a population of 7,393 people.

== Education ==
Caloundra City Private School is a private primary and secondary (Prep–12) school for boys and girls on Pelican Waters Boulevard (26.8240°S 153.1039°E). In 2017, the school had an enrolment of 281 students with 24 teachers (21 full-time equivalent) and 9 non-teaching staff (8 full-time equivalent).

There are no government schools in the suburb. The nearest government primary school is Golden Beach State School at Golden Beach. The nearest government secondary school is Caloundra State High School in Caloundra.

== Amenities ==
The Sunshine Coast Regional Council operates a mobile library service which visits the Shopping Village (26.8336°S 153.1086°E).
