= County of Clinton, Queensland =

Clinton Queensland
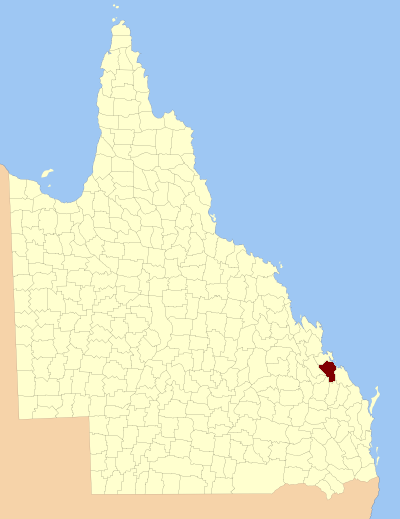
- Location within Queensland
Lands administrative divisions around Clinton:
| Deas Thompson | Deas Thompson | Coral Sea |
| Raglan | Clinton | Coral Sea |
| Pelham; Rawbelle | Yarrol | Flinders |

The County of Clinton is a county (a cadastral division) in Queensland, Australia. It is centred on the city of Gladstone and includes most of the Gladstone Region. The county was created on 1 September 1855 by royal proclamation under the Waste Lands Australia Act 1846. On 7 March 1901, the Governor issued a proclamation legally dividing Queensland into counties under the Land Act 1897. Its schedule described Clinton thus:

Bounded on the south by the county of Yarrol; on the west by the county of Rawbelle and the eastern watershed of Callide Creek and the Don River; on the north by the northern watershed of the Calliope River; and on the east by the Pacific Ocean and the county of Flinders.

== Parishes ==
Clinton is divided into parishes, as listed below:

| Parish | LGA | Coordinates | Towns |
|---|---|---|---|
| Alma | Gladstone | 24°02′S 150°51′E | |
| Auckland | Gladstone | 23°52′S 151°13′E | Clinton |
| Balaclava | Gladstone | 23°59′S 150°45′E | |
| Barmundoo | Gladstone | 24°12′S 151°07′E | |
| Bompa | Gladstone | 24°36′S 151°22′E | |
| Booroom | Gladstone | 24°05′S 151°05′E | |
| Boyne | Gladstone | 24°01′S 151°18′E | Benaraby |
| Calliope | Gladstone | 23°52′S 151°09′E | Yarwun, Targinie |
| Dawes | Gladstone | 24°35′S 151°13′E | |
| Degalgil | Gladstone | 24°24′S 151°08′E | |
| Diglum | Gladstone | 24°17′S 151°03′E | |
| East Stowe | Gladstone | 23°59′S 151°12′E | Calliope |
| Gatcombe | Gladstone | 23°51′S 151°21′E | |
| Gayfield | Gladstone | 24°07′S 150°47′E | |
| Gladstone | Gladstone | 23°52′S 151°16′E | Gladstone, Toolooa |
| Iveragh | Gladstone | 24°01′S 151°23′E | Tannum Sands, Bangalee |
| Maxwelton | Gladstone | 24°08′S 150°56′E | |
| Milton | Gladstone | 24°24′S 151°20′E | Nagoorin, Ubobo |
| Mount Larcom | Gladstone | 23°53′S 151°01′E | |
| O'Connell | Gladstone | 24°07′S 151°22′E | Iveragh |
| Pemberton | Gladstone | 24°14′S 151°20′E | |
| Radley | Gladstone | 24°28′S 151°14′E | |
| Riverston | Gladstone | 24°05′S 151°12′E | |
| Rule | Gladstone | 24°31′S 151°21′E | Builyan |
| South Trees | Gladstone | 23°55′S 151°20′E | Boyne Island |
| Tondoon | Gladstone | 23°54′S 151°17′E | Glen Eden |
| Toolooa | Gladstone | 23°57′S 151°16′E | |
| West Stowe | Gladstone | 23°58′S 151°07′E | |
| Wietalaba | Gladstone | 24°17′S 151°14′E | |
