= County of Flinders, Queensland =

Flinders Queensland
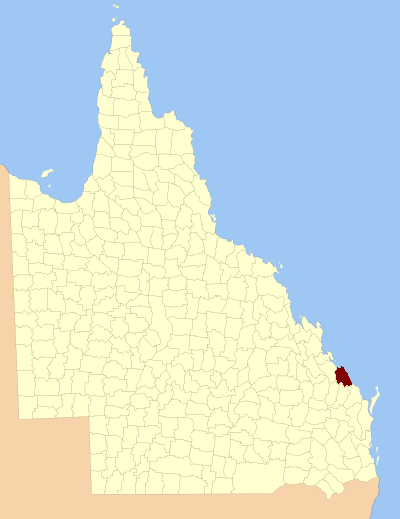
- Location within Queensland
Lands administrative divisions around Flinders:
Clinton	Coral Sea	Coral Sea
Clinton	Flinders	Coral Sea
Yarrol	Bowen	Cook

The County of Flinders is a county (a cadastral division) in Queensland, Australia, located in the Central Queensland region between Gladstone and Bundaberg. The county is divided into civil parishes. It was named for Matthew Flinders who explored the Australian coastline.

The county was created on 1 September 1855 by royal proclamation under the Waste Lands Australia Act 1846. On 7 March 1901, the Governor issued a proclamation legally dividing Queensland into counties under the Land Act 1897. Its schedule described Flinders thus:

Bounded on the south by the counties of Cook and Bowen; on the west by the county of Yarrol, the eastern watershed of the Boyne River, and the western boundary of the parist of Rodds Bay; and on the north and east by the Pacific Ocean.

== Parishes ==
Flinders is divided into parishes, as listed below:

Parish	LGA	Coordinates	Towns
Arthurs Seat	Gladstone	24°17′S 151°42′E	
Baffle	Gladstone	24°28′S 151°57′E	
Bulburin	Gladstone	24°32′S 151°34′E	
Bunker	Gladstone	23°46′S 152°22′E	
Euleilah	Gladstone	24°31′S 151°50′E	
Eurimbula	Gladstone	24°07′S 151°43′E	Town of 1770
Littabella	Bundaberg	24°40′S 152°05′E	Watalgan
Miriam Vale	Gladstone	24°22′S 151°35′E	Miriam Vale
Polmaily	Gladstone	24°20′S 151°29′E	Bororen
Rodds Bay	Gladstone	24°06′S 151°32′E	
Rosedale	Gladstone	24°41′S 151°51′E	Rosedale (S)
Taunton	Gladstone	24°24′S 151°44′E	
Thornhill	Gladstone	24°39′S 151°36′E	
Tottenham	Gladstone	24°36′S 151°59′E	Rosedale (N)
Uxbridge	Gladstone	24°19′S 151°53′E	Agnes Water
Warro	Gladstone	24°33′S 151°44′E	Lowmead

== External links ==
- "Map of the County of Flinders". Queensland Government. 1922.
