= County of Lennox =

Lennox Queensland
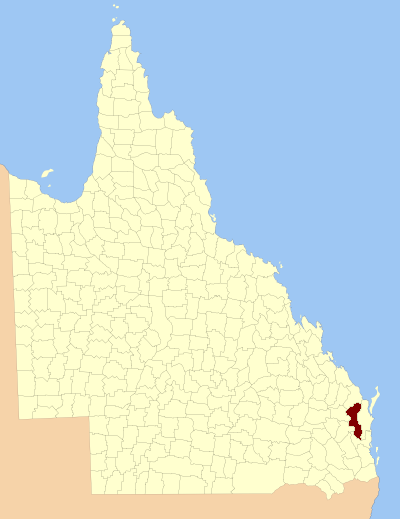
- Location within Queensland
Lands administrative divisions around Lennox:
Cook	Cook	March
Mackenzie	Lennox	March
Fitzroy	Canning	Canning

The County of Lennox is a county (a cadastral division) in Queensland, Australia. Like all counties in Queensland, it is a non-functional administrative unit, that is used mainly for the purpose of registering land titles.

The county consists of the inland region forming the western parts of the Gympie and Fraser Coast regions. It was officially named and bounded by the Governor in Council on 7 March 1901 under the Land Act 1897.

== Parishes ==
Lennox is divided into parishes, as listed below:

Parish	LGA	Coordinates	Towns
Amamoor	Gympie	26°21′S 152°39′E	Amamoor
Boompa	Fraser Coast	25°40′S 152°06′E	
Brooloo	Gympie	26°31′S 152°40′E	Brooloo, Imbil
Brooyar	Gympie	26°06′S 152°26′E	Glastonbury
Cambroon	Sunshine Coast	26°37′S 152°38′E	Kenilworth
Conondale	Sunshine Coast	26°43′S 153°36′E	
Denison	Fraser Coast	25°36′S 152°35′E	Mungar
Doongul	Fraser Coast	25°30′S 152°20′E	
Dunmora	Fraser Coast	25°31′S 152°30′E	
Ferguson	Fraser Coast	25°28′S 152°36′E	Oakhurst
Gigoomgan	Fraser Coast	25°47′S 152°15′E	
Glastonbury	Gympie	26°18′S 152°34′E	
Glenbar	Fraser Coast	25°48′S 152°24′E	
Gungaloon	Fraser Coast	25°34′S 152°28′E	
Imbil	Gympie	26°26′S 152°38′E	
Kandanga	Gympie	26°24′S 152°30′E	
Kilkivan	Gympie	26°09′S 152°14′E	Kilkivan
King	Gympie	26°12′S 152°35′E	
Marodian	Gympie	25°57′S 152°16′E	
Miva	Gympie	25°56′S 152°26′E	
St Mary	Fraser Coast	25°41′S 152°30′E	
Teebar	Fraser Coast	25°45′S 152°09′E	
Warrah	Fraser Coast	25°25′S 152°29′E	
Widgee	Gympie	26°16′S 152°24′E	
Woocoo	Fraser Coast	25°37′S 152°19′E	Brooweena
Woonga	Gympie	26°14′S 152°40′E	Southside, Jones Hill
Yabba	Gympie	26°34′S 152°28′E	

== External links ==
- "Map of the County of Lennox (sheet 1)". Queensland Government. 1921.
- "Map of the County of Lennox (sheet 2)". Queensland Government. 1921.
