= County of Livingstone, Queensland =

Livingstone Queensland
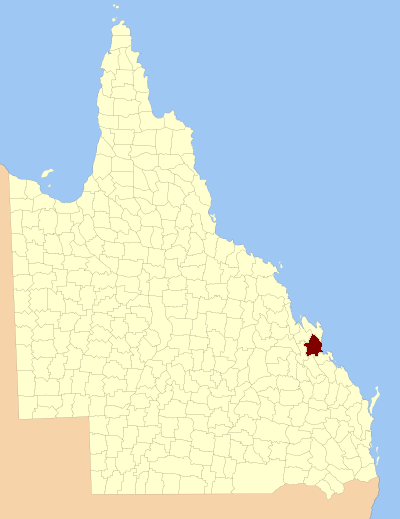
- Location within Queensland
Lands administrative divisions around Livingstone:
Liebig	Palmerston	Palmerston
Pakington	Livingstone	Coral Sea
Pakington	Raglan	Deas Thompson

The County of Livingstone is a county (a cadastral division) in Queensland, Australia. It is centred on the city of Rockhampton and includes most of the Rockhampton Region. The county was created on 1 September 1855 by royal proclamation under the Waste Lands Australia Act 1846. On 7 March 1901, the Governor issued a proclamation legally dividing Queensland into counties under the Land Act 1897. Its schedule described Livingstone thus:

Bounded on the south by the county of Deas Thompson and the southern boundaries of the parishes of Plews, Bouldercombe, Mooninera and Playfair; on the west by the western boundaries of the parishes of Playfair, Stanwell, Neerkol, Limestone, Morinish, Yaamba, Canoona and Werribee; on the north by the northern boundaries of the parishes of Werribee, Rosslynn and Yeppoon, and on the east by the Pacific Ocean,—inclusive of Great Keppel, North Keppel, and other adjacent islands.

== Parishes ==
Livingstone is divided into parishes, as listed below:

Parish	LGA	Coordinates	Towns
Archer	Rockhampton	23°22′S 150°36′E	North Rockhampton, Lakes Creek
Barmoya	Rockhampton	23°07′S 150°34′E	
Bouldercombe	Rockhampton	23°32′S 150°26′E	Bouldercombe
Calioran	Rockhampton	23°11′S 150°20′E	
Canoona	Rockhampton	22°57′S 150°21′E	
Cawarral	Rockhampton	23°14′S 150°38′E	Cawarral
Cecil	Rockhampton	23°33′S 150°39′E	
Faraday	Rockhampton	23°16′S 150°16′E	Ridgelands
Fitzroy	Rockhampton	23°12′S 150°27′E	The Caves
Gavial	Rockhampton	23°28′S 150°35′E	Midgee
Gracemere	Rockhampton	23°27′S 150°27′E	Gracemere, Kabra
Herbert	Rockhampton	23°28′S 150°51′E	
Hewittville	Rockhampton	23°14′S 150°46′E	Emu Park, Cooee Bay
Jardine	Rockhampton	23°05′S 150°25′E	Milman
Karkol	Rockhampton	23°21′S 150°26′E	
Keppel	Rockhampton	23°08′S 150°55′E	Great Keppel Island
Limestone	Rockhampton	23°22′S 150°15′E	
Meadow Flats	Rockhampton	23°21′S 150°49′E	Keppel Sands
Moonmera	Rockhampton	23°36′S 150°19′E	
Morinish	Rockhampton	23°12′S 150°10′E	
Murchison	Rockhampton	23°17′S 150°30′E	Norman Gardens, Kawana
Neerkol	Rockhampton	23°25′S 150°18′E	
Nicholson	Rockhampton	23°18′S 150°24′E	Alton Downs
Playfair	Rockhampton	23°33′S 150°11′E	Wycarbah
Plews	Rockhampton	23°35′S 150°33′E	
Rockhampton	Rockhampton	23°24′S 150°30′E	Rockhampton, Port Curtis
Rosslyn	Rockhampton	22°59′S 150°33′E	Rossmoya
Stanwell	Rockhampton	23°29′S 150°16′E	Stanwell
Thozet	Rockhampton	23°27′S 150°41′E	
Werribee	Rockhampton	22°52′S 150°29′E	
Wiseman	Rockhampton	23°22′S 150°23′E	
Yaamba	Rockhampton	23°04′S 150°18′E	Yaamba
Yeppoon	Rockhampton	23°07′S 150°43′E	Yeppoon

== External links ==
- "Map of the County of Livingstone (sheet 1)". Queensland Government. 1912.
- "Map of the County of Livingstone (sheet 1)". Queensland Government. 1921.
- "Map of the County of Livingstone (sheet 1)". Queensland Government. 1924.
- "Map of the County of Livingstone (sheet 2)". Queensland Government. 1921.
