= County of Lytton, Queensland =

Lytton Queensland
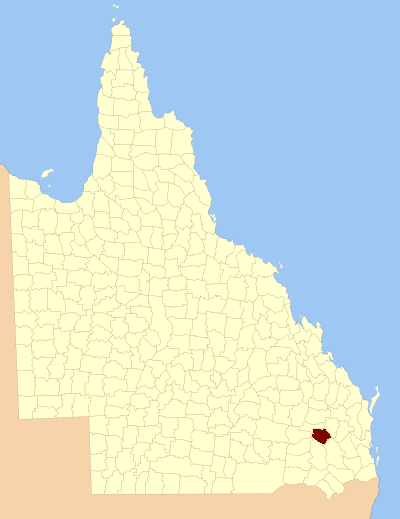
- Location within Queensland
Lands administrative divisions around Lytton:
Auburn	Auburn	Boondooma
Bulwer	Lytton	Boondooma
Rogers	Derby	Aubigny

The County of Lytton is a county (a cadastral division) in the Darling Downs region of Queensland, Australia. It was named and bounded by the Governor in Council on 7 March 1901 under the Land Act 1897.

== Parishes ==
Lytton is divided into parishes, as listed below:

Parish	LGA	Coordinates	
Bell	Western Downs	26°59′S 151°08′E	
Brownlie	Western Downs	26°32′S 150°44′E	
Buchan	Western Downs	26°31′S 150°50′E	
Burncluith	Western Downs	26°36′S 150°41′E	
Canaga	Western Downs	26°40′S 151°00′E	
Chinchilla	Western Downs	26°46′S 150°40′E	Chinchilla
Colamba	Western Downs	26°42′S 150°36′E	
Cooranga	Western Downs	26°52′S 151°10′E	
Diamondy	Western Downs	26°35′S 151°16′E	
Earle	Western Downs	26°50′S 150°49′E	Brigalow
Jandowae	Western Downs	26°44′S 151°11′E	Jandowae
Jingi Jingi	Western Downs	26°34′S 151°07′E	
Logie	Western Downs	26°39′S 150°50′E	
Macalister	Western Downs	27°01′S 151°04′E	Macalister
Mahen	Western Downs	26°44′S 151°22′E	
Nudley	Western Downs	26°32′S 150°59′E	
Palmer	Western Downs	26°51′S 151°18′E	
Thorn	Western Downs	26°55′S 150°56′E	Warra
Tuckerang	Western Downs	26°48′S 151°00′E	
Tully	Western Downs	26°55′S 151°02′E	

== External links ==
- "Map of the County of Lytton". Queensland Government. 1921.
