= County of Cook, Queensland =

Cook Queensland
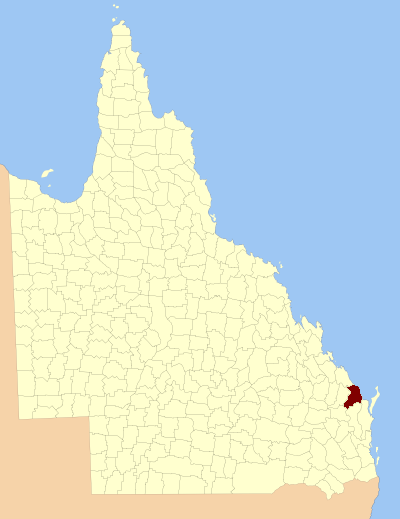
- Location within Queensland
Lands administrative divisions around Cook:
Flinders	Coral Sea	Coral Sea
Bowen	Cook	Coral Sea
Mackenzie	Lennox	March

The county of Cook is a cadastral division of Queensland, centred on the city of Bundaberg, and its name honours Captain James Cook. It was officially named and bounded by the Governor in Council on 7 March 1901 under the Land Act 1897.

== Parishes ==
Cook is divided into parishes, as listed below:

Parish	LGA	Coordinates	Towns
Barns	Bundaberg	25°01′S 152°26′E	
Barolin	Bundaberg	24°50′S 152°26′E	Bargara, Burnett Heads, Elliott Heads
Bingera	Bundaberg	25°02′S 152°16′E	
Booyal	Bundaberg	25°09′S 152°03′E	Booyal
Broomfield	North Burnett	25°27′S 152°12′E	
Bundaberg	Bundaberg	24°56′S 152°20′E	Bundaberg, Avoca, Branyan
Burrum	Fraser Coast	25°19′S 152°32′E	Howard
Cherwell	Fraser Coast	25°16′S 152°28′E	
Childers	Bundaberg	25°15′S 152°18′E	Childers
Chowey	North Burnett	25°28′S 151°52′E	Didcot
Coringa	North Burnett	25°21′S 151°57′E	
Dallarnil	North Burnett	25°22′S 152°04′E	Dallarnil
Degilbo	North Burnett	25°31′S 151°57′E	Biggenden, Degilbo
Electra	Bundaberg	25°04′S 152°08′E	
Eureka	Bundaberg	25°18′S 152°10′E	
Gooburrum	Bundaberg	24°47′S 152°20′E	Bundaberg North, Gooburrum
Gregory	Bundaberg	25°09′S 152°16′E	Cordalba
Hercules	Bundaberg	25°09′S 152°35′E	Woodgate (S)
Isis	Bundaberg	25°11′S 152°27′E	Buxton
Kalkie	Bundaberg	24°54′S 152°24′E	Bundaberg East, Kalkie, Walkervale
Kinagin	Bundaberg	24°50′S 152°01′E	
Kolbore	Fraser Coast	25°20′S 152°25′E	
Kullogum	Bundaberg	25°21′S 152°16′E	
Marathon	Bundaberg	25°06′S 152°26′E	Goodwood, Woodgate (N)
Mungore	North Burnett	25°35′S 152°04′E	
North Kolan	Bundaberg	24°47′S 152°12′E	
Otoo	Bundaberg	24°47′S 152°15′E	Oakwood
South Kolan	Bundaberg	24°55′S 152°10′E	
Stanton	Bundaberg	25°14′S 152°04′E	
Takalvan	Bundaberg	24°55′S 152°16′E	
Tantitha	Bundaberg	24°52′S 152°16′E	Sharon
Walsh	Fraser Coast	25°16′S 152°36′E	Burrum Heads, Torbanlea
Woowoonga	North Burnett	25°28′S 152°05′E	
Yandaran	Bundaberg	24°46′S 152°07′E	Yandaran, Avondale

== See also ==
- Lands administrative divisions of Queensland
