= County of Bowen =

Bowen Queensland
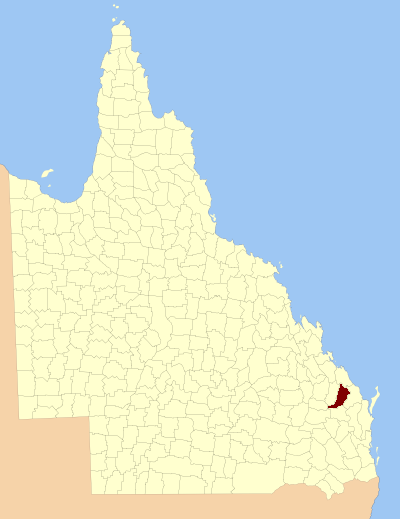
- Location within Queensland
Lands administrative divisions around Bowen:
Yarrol	Flinders	Cook
Yarrol	Bowen	Cook
Wicklow	Mackenzie	Cook

The County of Bowen is a county (a cadastral division) in Queensland, Australia, located in the Wide Bay–Burnett region to the west of Bundaberg. It was named in honour of Sir George Ferguson Bowen, the first Governor of Queensland. On 7 March 1901, the Governor issued a proclamation legally dividing Queensland into counties under the Land Act 1897. Its schedule described Bowen thus:

Bounded on the east by the county of Cook; on the south by the county of Mackenzie; on the west by [...] the parishes of Mundowran, Boomerang, Binjour, Jonday, Yenda, Wolca, Wombah, Kolonga and Toweran; and on the north by the northern boundaries of the parishes of Toweran, Kolonga and Manduran.

== Parishes ==
Bowen is divided into parishes, as listed below:

Parish	LGA	Coordinates	Towns	Parish map
Binjour	North Burnett	25°33′S 151°29′E	Binjour	1973 map
Boolbunda	Bundaberg	25°03′S 151°42′E	Boolboonda	1968 map
Chin Chin	North Burnett	25°11′S 151°50′E		1876 map
Gin Gin	Bundaberg	25°00′S 152°00′E	Gin Gin, Bullyard, Tirroan	1972 map
Grosvenor	North Burnett	25°14′S 151°41′E		1969 map
Joanborough	Bundaberg	24°56′S 151°54′E		1971 map
Jonday	North Burnett	25°25′S 151°30′E		1969 map
Kolonga	Bundaberg	24°51′S 151°43′E	Kolonga	1977 map (sheet 2 only)
Mingo	North Burnett	25°20′S 151°46′E		1967 map
Monduran	Bundaberg	24°49′S 151°54′E	Monduran	1971 map
Moolboolaman	Bundaberg	25°01′S 151°49′E	Moolboolaman	1972 map
Mount Perry	North Burnett	25°09′S 151°42′E	Mount Perry	1971 map
St Agnes	Bundaberg	25°16′S 151°57′E		1972 map
Tarrara	North Burnett	25°27′S 151°37′E	Yenda	1971 map
Taughboyne	North Burnett	25°33′S 151°37′E	Gayndah (N), Ideraway	1971 map
Toweran	Gladstone	24°42′S 151°41′E		1976 map
Walla	Bundaberg	25°06′S 151°56′E	Wallaville	1971 map
Wateranga	North Burnett	25°23′S 151°50′E		1972 map
Wetheron	North Burnett	25°27′S 151°44′E		1971 map
Wolca	North Burnett	25°11′S 151°34′E		1973 map
Wonbah	Bundaberg	25°01′S 151°37′E		1971 map
Yenda	North Burnett	25°20′S 151°38′E		1966 map
