= County of Wicklow, Queensland =

Wicklow Queensland
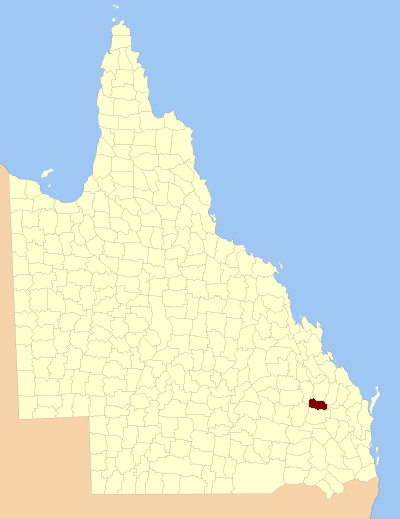
- Location within Queensland
Lands administrative divisions around Wicklow:
Dawson	Rawbelle	Yarrol
Fortescue	Wicklow	Bowen
Fortescue	Newcastle	Mackenzie

Wicklow County is a county (a cadastral division) in Queensland, Australia, located in the Wide Bay–Burnett region. On 7 March 1901, the Governor issued a proclamation legally dividing Queensland into counties under the Land Act 1897. Its schedule described Wicklow thus:

Bounded on the east by the county of Yarrol; on the south by the county of Newcastle; on the west by the eastern watershed of the Dawson River; and on the north by the south boundaries of Knockbreak Lease, Calrossie Resumption, Culcragie Lease, part of Culcragie Resumption, and by the north boundary of Eidsvold Resumption.

== Parishes ==
Parish	LGA	Coordinates
Auburn	North Burnett	25°36′S 151°07′E
Boolgal	North Burnett	25°27′S 150°55′E
Borania	North Burnett	25°22′S 150°30′E
Cheltenham	North Burnett	25°34′S 150°49′E
Cloncose	North Burnett	25°23′S 150°38′E
Dykehead	North Burnett	25°37′S 151°00′E
Dyngie	North Burnett	25°28′S 150°31′E
Eidsvold	North Burnett	25°27′S 151°03′E
Narayen	North Burnett	25°39′S 150°51′E
Redbank	North Burnett	25°36′S 150°41′E
Woodbank	North Burnett	25°35′S 150°30′E
Yerilla	North Burnett	25°24′S 150°48′E

== External links ==
- "Map of the County of Wicklow". Queensland Government. 1923.
