= County of Canning =

Canning Queensland
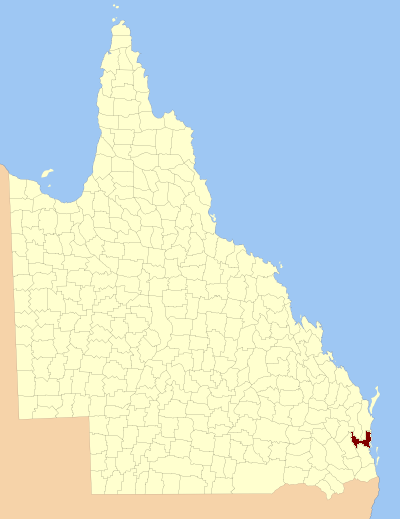
- Location within Queensland
Lands administrative divisions around Canning:
Fitzroy	Lennox	March
Cavendish	Canning	Coral Sea
Cavendish	Stanley	Coral Sea

The County of Canning is a county (a cadastral division) in Queensland, Australia. The county consists of almost all of the former Shires of Caboolture, Maroochy and Kilcoy and the former City of Caloundra. Its main urbanised areas are centred on the Sunshine Coast (excluding Noosa) and the areas surrounding Caboolture.

== History ==
Canning was first created by an Order in Council by the Governor of New South Wales on 30 December 1848. It was named in honour of Sir George Canning, who had served as British Foreign Secretary and briefly as Prime Minister. The county was then described in the following terms:

County of Canning, containing about 1330 square miles. Bounded on the east by the sea-coast from the 27th parallel of south latitude to the river Maroochydore (sic), including part of Bribie Island and other islands within these limits; on the north by the Maroochy river to its source, thence by the range dividing the waters from the river Mary from those of the Brisbane to Jimna at the source of the Brisbane; on the south-west by the river Brisbane until it reaches the 27th parallel of south latitude; and on the south by the 27th parallel of south latitude, which is the northern boundary of the present reputed county of Stanley.

On 7 March 1901, the Governor of Queensland proclaimed new boundaries under the Land Act 1897. The south boundary was altered from the 27th parallel to the Caboolture River while the north boundary was extended to the Shire of Noosa boundary.

Bounded on the south by the county of Stanley; on the west by the Brisbane River and the parish of Monsildale; on the north by the parishes of Monsildale, Kilcoy and Durundur; again on the west by the west boundaries of the parishes of Bribie and Maroochy; again on north by the north boundary of the parish of Maroochy; and on the east by the Pacific Ocean,—including Bribie Island.

== Parishes ==
Canning is divided into parishes, as listed below:

Parish	LGA	Coordinates	Towns
Beerwah	Sunshine Coast	26°56′S 152°58′E	Beerwah, Beerburrum
Bowman	Somerset	27°05′S 152°33′E	Somerset Dam, Hazeldean
Bribie	Sunshine Coast	26°49′S 153°00′E	Caloundra, Landsborough
Canning	Moreton Bay	27°03′S 152°57′E	Caboolture, Elimbah
Cressbrook	Somerset	27°03′S 152°27′E	
Durundur	Moreton Bay	26°54′S 152°47′E	Woodford
Kilcoy	Somerset	26°52′S 152°34′E	Kilcoy
Maroochy	Sunshine Coast	26°33′S 153°00′E	Nambour, Eumundi, Coolum
Monsildale	Somerset	26°39′S 152°22′E	
Mooloolah	Sunshine Coast	26°40′S 153°00′E	Maroochydore, Eudlo, Sippy Downs
Neara	Somerset	26°54′S 152°24′E	
Toorbul	Moreton Bay	27°05′S 153°05′E	Toorbul, Ningi
Wararba	Moreton Bay	27°03′S 152°51′E	Wamuran
Woorim	Moreton Bay	26°58′S 153°07′E	Bribie Island
