= Moreton Island lighthouses =

List of lighthouses on Moreton Island, Australia

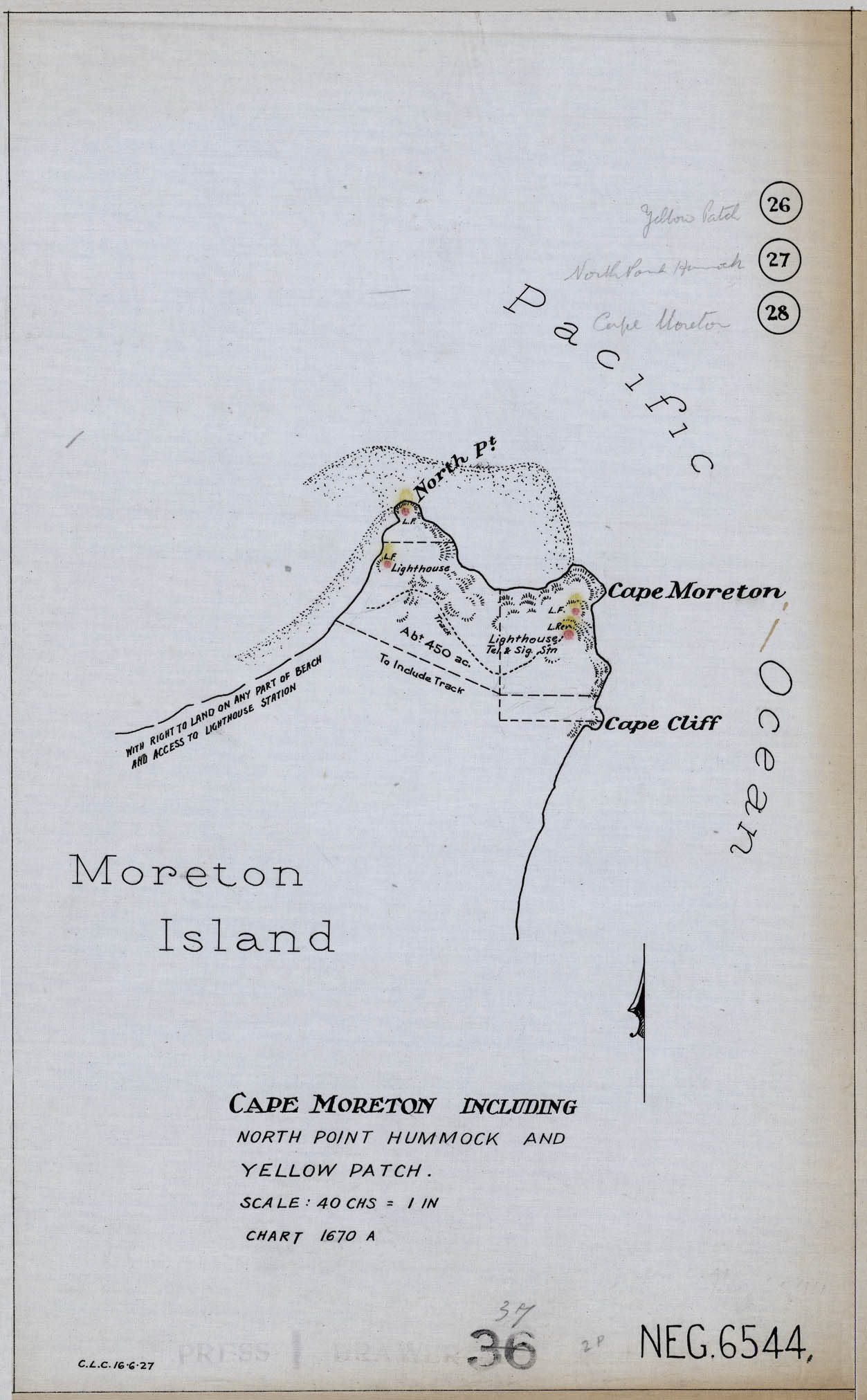
1927 Plan of the northern tip of Moreton Island, showing the locations of Cape Moreton Light, North Point Light and Yellow Patch Light

Moreton Island is a large sand island on the eastern side of Moreton Bay, on the coast of South East Queensland, Australia. Due to the island's importance in navigating the northern passage into Moreton Bay and Brisbane, at least five lighthouses were constructed on the island, starting with Cape Moreton Light in 1857 (168 years ago), the first lighthouse in Queensland, and followed by at least four more lighthouses established from the 1860s, at Comboyuro Point, North Point, Cowan Cowan Point and Yellow Patch. Comboyuro Point Light, Cowan Cowan Point Light and Yellow Patch Light all had to be moved from their original location due to coastal erosion. Of the five lighthouses, only Cape Moreton Light survived and is still active today.

== Background ==
In 1825, Brisbane was established as a penal settlement. In spite of the hazards, the preferred access to Moreton Bay and Brisbane was through the southern entrance, between Moreton Island and North Stradbroke Island, mainly due to shorter shipping route and better shipping conditions. The southern entrance was therefore marked in 1825 and a pilot station was established at Amity Point on North Stradbroke Island in 1827. Although the northern entrance was considered in the 1830s, it was only with the increased shipping activity due to the proclamation of Moreton Bay as a free settlement in 1842 that vessels began to use the northern entrance. Buoys marking the entrance were laid in 1846–1847, and in 1848 the Pilot Station was moved to Cowan Cowan on Moreton island and then to Bulwer. By then the northern entry was regarded as the main entry.

== Cape Moreton Light ==
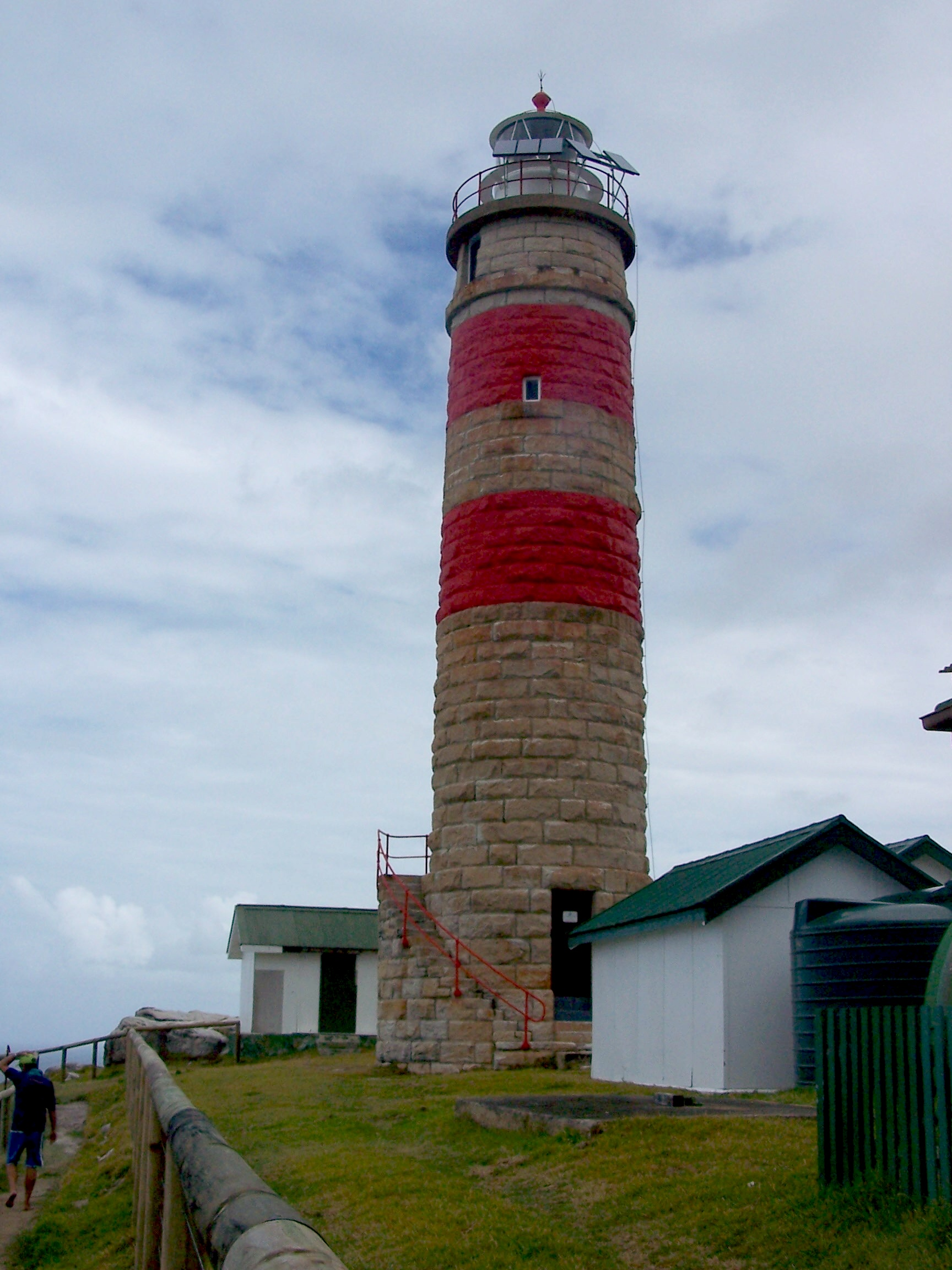
Cape Moreton Light, the only lighthouse still active on Moreton Bay

Cape Moreton Light is located on Cape Moreton, a rocky headland at the northeastern tip of Moreton Island, and was the first lighthouse to be constructed to mark the northern entrance. The lighthouse was constructed by the New South Wales Government, which controlled the Queensland area until Queensland's separation in 1859, following Brisbane residents petitions in 1850, and was first displayed in February 1857. From the five lighthouses, it is the only one still extant. Since its conversion to solar powered VRB-25 in 1993, it shows light characteristic of four white flashes, separated by 3.3 seconds, every 20 seconds (Fl.(4)W. 20s), visible for 15 nautical miles (28 km; 17 mi).

== Comboyuro Point Light ==
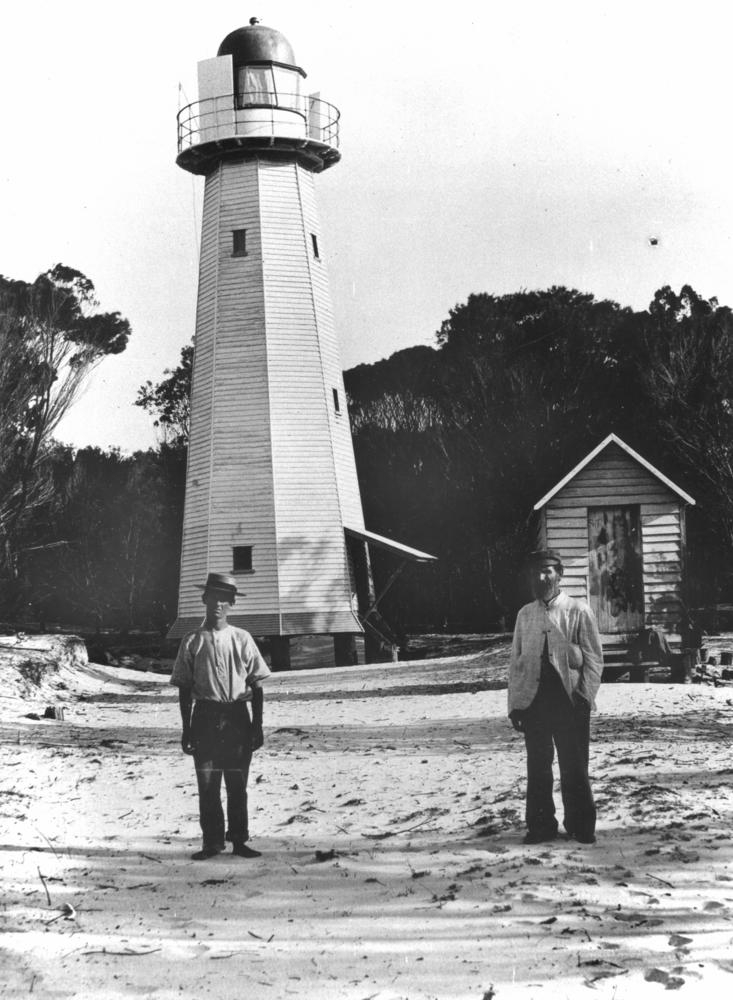
Comboyuro Point Light in 1906

Comboyuro Point Light, which was also known later as Comboyuro Light, was located Comboyuro Point, at the north western tip of Moreton Island.

== North Point Light ==
North Point Light, also known as North Point Hummock Light, was located on North Point, the most northern point on Moreton Island.

== Cowan Cowan Point Light ==
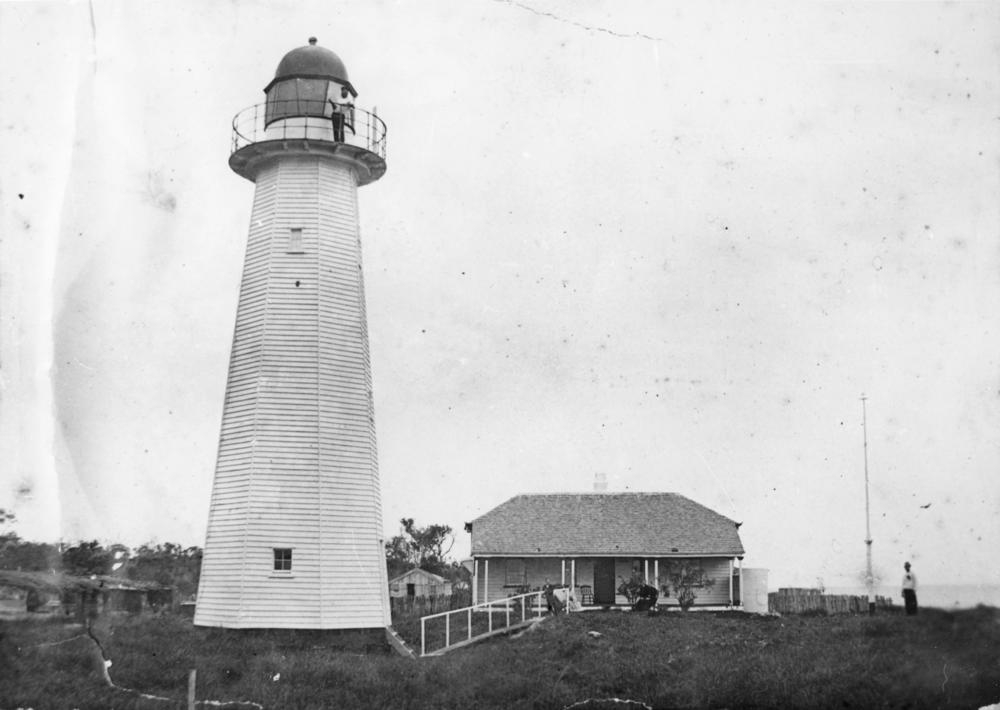
Cowan Cowan Point Light in 1899

Cowan Cowan Point Light, was also known as Cowan Cowan Light or Cowan Point Light, was located on Cowan Cowan Point, on the western shore of Moreton Island.

== Yellow Patch Light ==
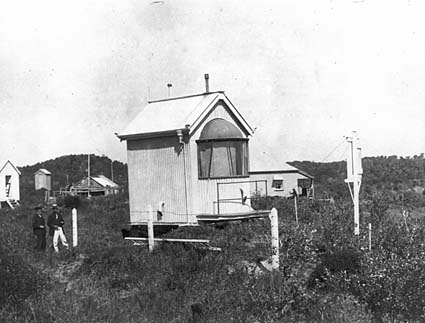
Yellow Patch Light, 1917

Yellow Patch Light was located about 0.5 miles (0.80 km) southwest of North Point. An 1877 book describes it as a 43 feet (13 m) high wooden tower, showing a fixed white light.

Yellow Patch Light also suffered from coastal erosion. In 1882 it had to be shifted 300 feet (91 m) to the northeast, and by 1891 it was moved four times.

A 1909 listing describes it as a square wooden lightroom, carrying a fixed fourth order dioptric apparatus. The light shown was red and white sectors, visible for 11 nautical miles (20 km; 13 mi).

The 2010 List of Lights does not list a light at the location.

== See also ==
- List of lighthouses in Australia
