= Jimna Single Men's Barracks =

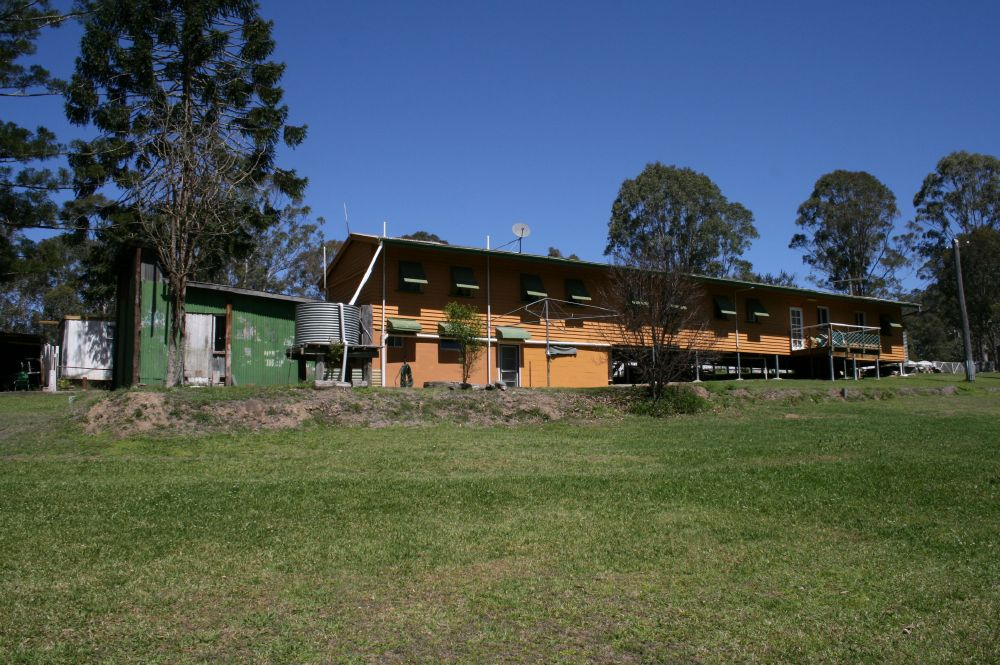
- Former Jimna Single Men's Barracks, 2007

- Location within Queensland Location within Australia
- 26.6579°S 152.4641°E
- Location: J4 Tip Road, Jimna, Somerset Region, Queensland, Australia

History
- Design period: 1919–1930s (interwar period)
- Built: 1930s

Queensland Heritage Register
- Official name: Jimna Single Men's Barracks (former)
- Type: state heritage (built)
- Designated: 27 November 2008
- Reference no.: 602685
- Significant period: 1930s
- Significant components: barracks – workers, kitchen/kitchen house, room/unit/suite

Jimna Single Men's Barracks is a heritage-listed workers' housing at 4 Tip Road, Jimna, Somerset Region, Queensland, Australia. It was built in 1930s. It was added to the Queensland Heritage Register on 27 November 2008.

== History ==
Jimna Single Men's Barracks in Tip Road constructed at Jimna, 40 kilometres (25 mi) north of Kilcoy, demonstrate the development of the timber industry in southern Queensland. The Jimna Single Men's Barracks is a remnant of the accommodation for workers in this privately operated timber town. The barracks provided accommodation in a remote location for timber workers and demonstrates the principal characteristics of workers' accommodation. It has a strong association with the Hancock and Gore Ltd, a major Queensland timber firm, which operated the timber town of Jimna from 1922 for approximately 50 years while milling timber obtained from native forest, then forestry plantations, around Jimna.

By the turn of the 20th century the most desirable timbers in the easily accessible coastal areas of southeast Queensland were heavily depleted and the main focus of activity was moving inland. The opening of the Kilcoy railway line between Caboolture and Woodford in 1909, which was extended to Kilcoy in 1913, stimulated more timber-getting and sawmilling along its route and in forested areas within travelling distance of the railhead.

The siting of Jimna conformed to a number of criteria for establishment of sawmilling townships. Jimna is situated on the Jimna Range approximately 1,690 feet (520 m) above sea level on the western side of Yabba Creek about 40 kilometres (25 mi) from Kilcoy. Proximity to the Kilcoy branch line made timber-felling and sawmilling there viable. According to E.S. Hancock of Hancock and Gore Ltd. bush sawmills were set up because royalties for the timber were assessed on the basis of the cost of extraction of logs to the nearest railway siding plus freight to the market, which was either a provincial city or Brisbane. When the logs were converted to timber in the country there was a saving in freight because, in the case of pine, there was a loss of approximately 25 per cent in sawdust and edging, and in hardwood a 50 per cent loss. Consequently, the saving in freight costs to market by railway, although not equivalent to the sawdust reduction was attractive. Furthermore, sawmill settlements were placed close to well-timbered forests on a site with a good water supply.

Hancock and Gore Ltd evolved from the firm Hancock Brothers Ltd sawmillers and timber merchants, established at North Ipswich in 1872 by Thomas Hancock. Born in Cornwall in 1816, Hancock came to Queensland via Sydney with his three sons and one daughter. He started a steam sawmill at the Rosewood Scrub and later opened a timber yard in North Ipswich and a small mill in Canning Street, Ipswich. When Thomas Hancock retired in 1884 the firm was taken over by his sons, Josiah and Thomas, jnr. The firm of Hancock and Gore was established in 1898 and converted to a limited liability company in 1904. Under the managing directorship of Josias Henry Hancock, grandson of the founder, the company expanded rapidly. It built mills at 13 rural centres in Queensland, five locations in Brisbane and at Rosebery and Lismore in New South Wales. In 1911 the firm moved to its Ipswich Road, Brisbane headquarters. In this period, sawmilling commenced at Monsildale in the Upper Brisbane Valley where in 1912 Hancock and Gore Ltd built a new mill on land rented from James Horne. The company's business interests expanded to include a case mill in Ipswich Road, Brisbane c. 1920, a ply mill and a hot press for plywood manufacture in the 1930s. The company became Australia's largest producer of plywood by 1945. Hancock and Gore continued to grow and expand to include the businesses: Brown & Broad, the Timber Corporation Ltd, The Rosebery Sawmilling Co, Cypress Timbers Ltd, Burts Transport Ltd, and Hancock and Gore Homes Ltd; forming the largest timber organisation in Queensland c. 1955. In 1981 the company was taken over by Takone Pty Limited.

Established in 1922, Jimna resulted from the relocation from Monsildale (seven miles away) of the sawmill, 16 houses, shop, store and provisional school. In 1922 the Jimna area was called Foxlowe the name purportedly given by George Byrne who had selected land along Yabba Creek in 1878. It was renamed Jimna by the GPO Department when naming the post office of the township between 1924 and June 1926. The removal and relocation of buildings from Monsildale occurred over a period of a few months. The first residents arrived to occupy the houses in August 1922. By November the mill was in working order and commenced cutting timber to be used for the construction of new houses and repairs to the old ones brought from Monsildale. In the same month, the store and butcher's shop were removed from Monsildale to Foxlowe and opened for business immediately.

Growth of Jimna township ensued over the next few decades. The population in 1924 was about 150 including 65 children, of whom 35 attended the provisional school. This school was replaced by a state school in 1934. Jimna expanded to a population of over 300 after re-forestation around Jimna commenced in the 1930s. Its population was at its highest when both pine and hardwood mills operated at Jimna, after 1943. The settlement had its own tennis and cricket club and a local hall was the venue for dances and religious services. The township was self-contained with Hancock and Gore supplying meat from their own fattening paddocks and slaughter yards.

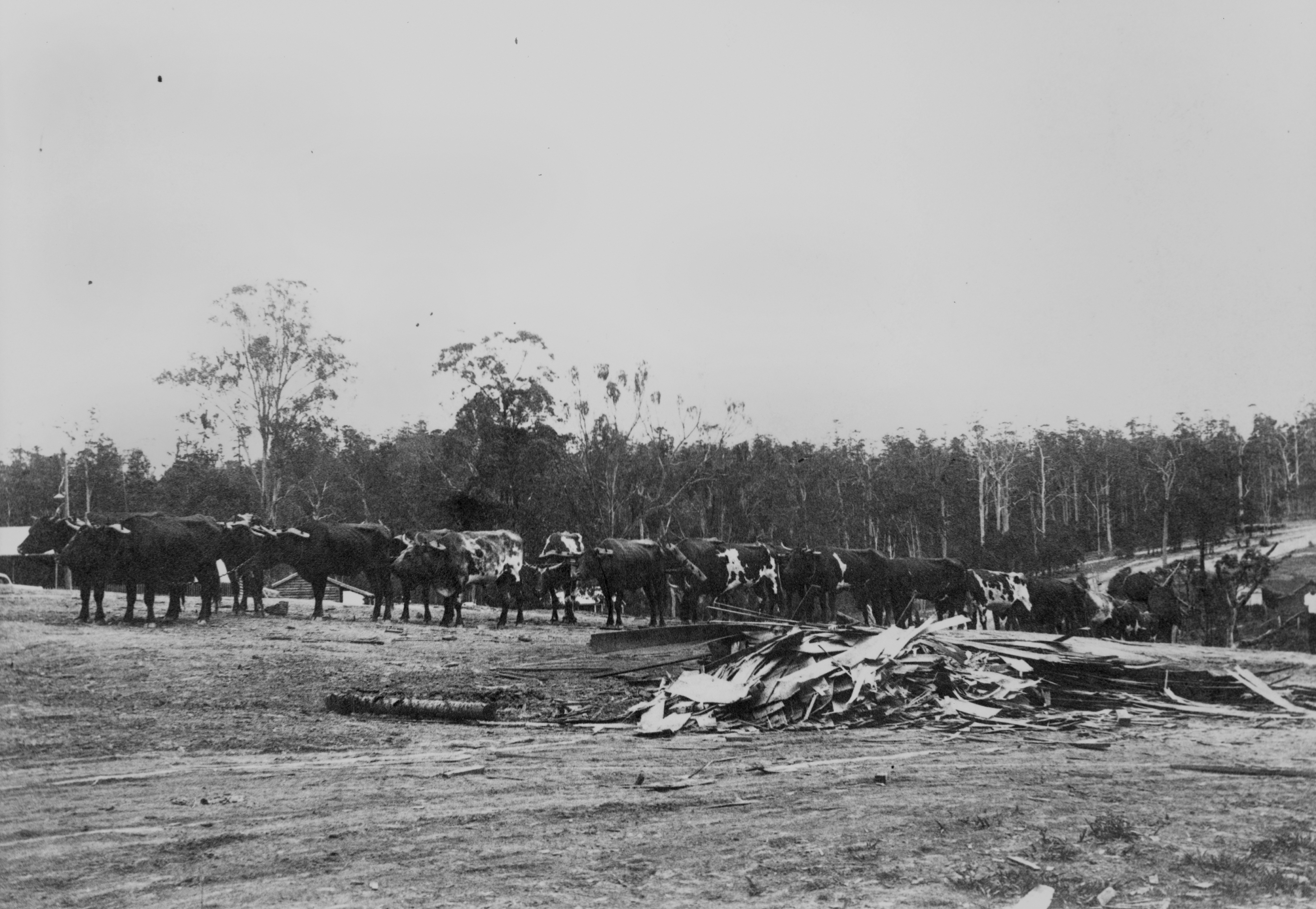
Bullock teams at Hancock and Gores sawmill, Jimna, circa 1928

The entire Jimna operation including timber cutters was controlled by Hancock and Gore Ltd. Once re-erected in 1922, the mill at Jimna was enlarged and in 1924 it was capable of turning out 80,000 super feet of sawn pine weekly. Initially the mill cut only hoop pine using steam-driven saws. In 1933 the Architectural and Building Journal of Queensland reported that Jimna Mill milled approximately 23,000 feet (7,000 m) of logs into wide boards and building timbers each day while the top logs were milled into case timber. At Brisbane the building timbers were planed on Hancock and Gore's planing machines and manufactured into all kinds of building timbers including lining boards and flooring. The case timbers were re-sawn and manufactured into butter boxes, jam cases, fruit cases, kerosene cases etc. Specially selected logs were transported to Brisbane for manufacture into "Bull-dog" plywood and Hancock and Gore Ltd high class joinery. Bringing timber to the mill were 15 bullock teams and 11 lorries, while five lorries delivered the sawn and seasoned timber to Kilcoy railway station for transportation to Hancock and Gore establishments in Brisbane. The record for the greatest daily output of pine was 48,000 super feet in 8 hours and for 10 hours work on the same day the cut was 64,500 super feet.

The area around Jimna was predominantly rainforest, thick with hoop pine when the Hancock and Gore mill commenced operations in 1922. This valuable resource was eventually cut out. Jimna became the site of reforestation experiments c. 1935 when a Forest Ranger was sent to Jimna to establish a nursery located on the site of the present forestry administration building. The establishment of hoop pine plantations in the region began in 1938.

Concerns about the depletion of native timbers in the period leading up to the 1930s led to the establishment of plantation forestry in south-east Queensland. As early as the late 19th century, it had become clear that the logging of native timbers at its current rate was unsustainable. The Queensland Acclimatisation Society and sawmillers such as William Pettigrew were among those calling for better management of the colony's forests. Various attempts to regulate timber-getters proved unsuccessful and by 1906, cedar was virtually extinct in south east Queensland. In 1897, in a bid to improve forest management, amendments were made to the Crown Lands Act which allowed for the proclamation of State Forests and in 1900 a Forestry Branch was created in the Department of Public Lands to continue reservation of well-timbered lands where necessary. From 1905, a policy of setting aside land for managed forests began to be pursued on the recommendations of the Forestry Branch. However, tension continued to persist between the advocates of forest conservation and interests associated with agriculture, pastoralism and timber industries both inside and outside of government.

Progress was made when Norman William Jolly, appointed as Director of Forests in 1910, recognised the urgent need for regeneration of native forests and for plantations of native and exotic timbers. He established a number of experimental stations and conducted experiments with the natural and artificial regeneration of hoop, bunya, cedar and exotics. Plantation forestry began in earnest during the tenure of Jolly's successor, Edward Swain (1918–1932). Swain established the State's first commercial plantations in 1920 to 1921, planting native seedlings in the Mary Valley, Atherton and Fraser Island. An independent Forestry Department was created in 1924, with much of its workforce supplied from returned soldiers employed under a Federal Government subsidy. A comprehensive survey of remaining forests was conducted by the Forestry Department in the 1920s. It was clear that more State Forests would be needed and also substantial plantations of exotic pines. With the exception of hoop pine, native timbers did not do well in plantations.

During the 1930s and 1940s upgrading and expansion of the Jimna sawmill continued. In 1935 when an electric planing machine was installed, a generator was used as the power source. It was also utilised to supply homes and streetlights with power. The planer was closed in 1942 to concentrate on timber for the war effort. In 1943 a hardwood mill was started. When the pine mill burned down in 1947 it was immediately re-built with much more modern machinery. Thinnings from the Forestry Department's hoop pine plantations were first milled at Jimna in 1947 or 1948. The Forestry Department maintained a presence in the area thereafter. Upgrading of machinery and power sources continued into the 1960s.

The Jimna mill closed in the early 1970s when it became more economical for the company to transport logs to mills on the coast than keep the sawmill operating. The mill was dismantled in the mid-1970s and thereafter the store, butcher and baker shops and post office closed as the workforce left. Where houses were occupied the Forestry Department offered to transfer the occupation leases to the occupants. Unoccupied houses were demolished or burned and almost half the buildings in the town disappeared. In 1984 the Forestry Department offered to freehold property and most residents purchased their houses.

In 2007, the remaining evidence of the town's 50-year history as a timber-milling settlement are the Single Men's Barracks with associated cookhouse; some houses for married workers in Dingo Parade, which was previously known as Honeymoon Avenue; the store, which has been altered significantly; the provisional school and state school buildings; the community hall; married men's quarters that date from 1957 or 1958 and have been relocated; and the concrete slab and mountings of the generator that powered the mill.

Some changes to the Single Men's Barracks have occurred over time. The original verandah is now only partly enclosed with windows, has been divided in two with a wall and door, and has had a store room erected at its eastern end. Openings have been made between a number of single rooms to allow them to operate as flats. A small, northern deck has been added and can be accessed from one of the newly created flats or suite of rooms. Underneath, steel support columns with individual pad footings have been installed; except for at the eastern end the building where concrete block has been used to enclose a number of wet service rooms. The cookhouse does not appear to have been altered significantly, other than to have the original range removed and another installed. The garden and fence to the southern facade of the barracks building has been altered since 1984, as the only close-up photographic evidence reveals.

Without any evidence from historical records, dating the building by its fabric alone is difficult, but it is most likely to have been erected between late 1922 when the sawmill began operation and the beginning of WW II. This estimate is based on its overall form, which features an enclosed verandah and a single roof over the entire structure; and the use of a single skin of fibrous cement sheeting on internal partition walls; as well as a number of elements believed to be original: the style of the casement windows with a number of lights and a predominance of mottled glazing, and the dark brown Bakelite electrolier light fittings (lights and adjacent cord-operated switch fixed to ceiling on timber board). Such an estimate would place the construction of the barracks at a time when the mill's operations was expanding in the 1930s and 40s.

== Description ==
On the Jimna Range, in the northern part of the Jimna State Forest, the Single Men's Barracks and cookhouse site is approximately 1.5 kilometres (0.93 mi) north from the turn-off to the Kilcoy-Murgon Road and approximately 1.5 kilometres (0.93 mi) east of the Jimna Fire Tower (which is also heritage-listed). The barracks building and its associated cookhouse occupy the eastern end of a 5408 square metre allotment in Tip Road on the northern edge of the remnant township of Jimna. At the western end of the long, rectangular allotment are a collection of other timber buildings, two of which are reputed to be married quarters shifted from another location within the settlement. They include at least one permanent dwelling, a shed and attached carport, and a fenced chicken run built around a mature bunya pine. Access to the site is from the adjacent allotment to the south. The line of the barracks and cookhouse sits perpendicular to the slope of a grassed hillside that falls to the north and a valley line that would connect with Yabba Creek to the east.

The Single Men's Barracks is a gable-roofed structure, approximately 30 metres (98 ft) long and 5 metres (16 ft) wide, which is raised off the ground on steel columns except at the eastern end where a set of understorey rooms, taking advantage of the slope of the ground, have been enclosed in concrete block and founded on a slab. The cookhouse sits approximately 2 metres (6 ft 7 in) away at the barracks' eastern, short end, its floor about level with that of the understorey rooms. To the south-east of this there is a timber-clad shed, caravan and rough-sawn timber-framed shelter with corrugated iron roof. Amidst these structures stand three mature bunya and hoop pine trees. Between the southern facade and site boundary is a grassed and fenced yard with maintained garden beds that, according to photographic evidence has been formed after 1984. The boundary fence is timber and parts are reputedly made of reclaimed cedar posts. To the south in the adjacent allotment the remains of the sawmilling town's ant-bed tennis court are visible.

=== The barracks ===
The gable roof of the barracks is clad in corrugated iron; however its ridge line is not symmetrically disposed over the building, being approximately 1.5 metres (4 ft 11 in) from the northern facade. The pitch of both roof faces is approximately 11 Degrees. The walls are clad in weatherboards. A semi-enclosed verandah stretches the full length of the building on its southern side. To the height of the timber handrail, which is approximately 1 metre (3 ft 3 in), it is clad in weatherboards, while above this it is partially enclosed with a variety of windows, including timber-framed casements and aluminium-framed sliders. The verandah can be accessed at two points: via a small, timber ramp on the western facade and from timber stairs, approximately 1.2 metres (3 ft 11 in) wide, positioned in the centre of the southern facade. A recent metal roof shelters these stairs, and a set of timber-framed, 10-light double doors open into the verandah at the head of them; while a high- waisted timber door provides access from the ramp.

A corrugated iron tank on a low, timber-framed tank stand is positioned adjacent to the door on the western facade. Between these two features a series of cuts in the weatherboards correspond to the internal width of the verandah. The eastern facade to the cookhouse has no openings, although it also has a series of consecutive cuts, which have been covered by metal plates, in an upper section of the weatherboard cladding. What these cuts in the weatherboarding means is unclear, as there are no close-up photographs of the building taken prior to 1984.

There are twelve openings on the northern facade. The original rhythm of six sets of two has been maintained, although the fourth from the west has been formed into a door to give access to a small timber deck. This door and the two windows toward the west belong to a set of later additions, the former being timber-framed and painted white and the latter two being aluminium-framed casements. The remaining windows are merely openings that are sealed with flyscreen and can only be closed by bringing down the timber awning shutters, which are propped open with pieces of timber dowel.

Running off the verandah, on the northern side of the barracks building, the demarcation of twelve small rooms can still be easily discerned, despite a number of openings being made to allow access between them. These rooms are approximately 3 metres (9.8 ft) deep and 2.4 metres (7 ft 10 in) wide, and all except one have a floor to ceiling height of 2.8 metres (9 ft 2 in). The verandah has been partitioned by a wall with a board door, the western end serving the first four rooms and the eastern end the remaining eight. The outer walls in both sections are unlined, while the opposing ones are clad in weatherboards. The floors are made with wide timber boards that are carpeted in places, and the ceiling is unlined.

The first room at the westernmost end of the building is used as a laundry and the framing of the walls, and the roof as there is no ceiling, is visible here. The wall studs are housed or notched directly into the end rafter and there is a ridge beam and widely spaced battens. Openings have been made into the shared walls to allow Room Numbers 2, 3, 4 and 5 (refer sketch plan drawing below) to operate as a flat for the owner of the barracks building, containing bath, bed, and living rooms as well as a kitchen. The walls and ceilings of all twelve rooms in the barracks are clad in fibrous cement sheeting. Those on the northern and southern sides have timber cover strips. Those shared are single-skin, with exposed timber framing decorated with rounded cover strips, on each face. Any later openings between rooms have been kept within this framing grid, where the single horizontal rail is approximately 1.8 metres (5 ft 11 in) from the floor. Room Numbers 10, 11 and 12 have been joined in a similar way with a small store room having been installed at the easternmost end of the verandah. In addition Room Numbers 8 and 9 have been joined. The internal linings, rails and cover strips have been painted.

In the understorey rooms, at the eastern end of the building, the floor framing is visible, revealing that the wall studs are housed or notched into the bearers, requiring the floorboards to be fitted around them. Much of the timber framing and cladding in the barracks building bear the marks of a circular saw. The studs to the internal partition walls bear on the floorboards.

There are two types of timber casement window, which are likely to be original. The only close-up photograph of the barracks was taken in 1984 when the property was purchased by its current owner. It is after this time that changes have been made to suit their personal requirements. The first window type is divided by mullions into four equal lights of mottled glazing. The second is divided in half, and then the upper section has two narrow lights in its lower half. These are clear glazing while the other two are mottled.

=== The cookhouse ===
The cookhouse is rectangular in plan, approximately 4.5 metres (15 ft) to the east and west, and 6.5 metres (21 ft) in the opposite direction. It is clad entirely in corrugated iron, which on the walls is fitted between large undressed timber posts and continues to the underside of the ceiling joists, leaving a narrow gap. The eaves are unlined. The corner posts at the eastern end are notched to take horizontal timber wall members. A narrow section of roof, approximately 4 metres (13 ft) from the ground and running along the cookhouse's eastern end, projects approximately one metre above the remaining skillion roof to form a chimney for the range inside. A large sliding, corrugated iron-clad door takes up the entire western facade to the barracks to a height of approximately 2 metres (6 ft 7 in). It runs on a metal head track, and when open, projects past the northern facade of the structure. There is a timber-framed awning window in the southern facade. There are no openings on the eastern facade. To the north, there is a single board door and narrow fixed window. A set of logs and large rocks form a number of steps away from this door. A large corrugated iron tank and timber- framed stand sits adjacent to the cookhouse to the north.

On the interior, the cookhouse is a single room with unlined walls. Along the eastern wall are two Crown cast-iron ranges, the one in the middle being used when the sawmilling township was operational, having been moved from the boarding house. It is supported at each end on half-height brick walls. A tubular, metal flue sits at its rear. The floor is brick with some patchy carpeting. Around the walls a concrete edge-beam that rises above the floor level by approximately 20 centimetres (7.9 in) is visible. The walls, particularly those on the east where the range is situated, are covered in blackened grease and smoke residue.

== Heritage listing ==
The former Jimna Single Men's Barracks was listed on the Queensland Heritage Register on 27 November 2008 having satisfied the following criteria.

The place is important in demonstrating the evolution or pattern of Queensland's history.

Jimna Single Men's Barracks (c. 1930) is important in demonstrating the evolution or pattern of Queensland history relating to the timber industry in southern Queensland, which was the most productive timber-getting region in the State. Jimna demonstrates the phase of inland timber-getting after the easily accessible coastal softwoods were depleted in the 19th century. Dating from 1922 Jimna was one of the sites of timber retrieval facilitated and intrinsically linked to branch rail line development.

Jimna Single Men's Barracks demonstrates the practice by private companies involved in the removal and milling of Queensland timbers from native and later plantation forests of providing the infrastructure, in particular accommodation, of inland timber towns built around mill sites.

The place demonstrates rare, uncommon or endangered aspects of Queensland's cultural heritage.

Jimna Single Men's Barracks, is a remnant of a privately operated timber town, a form of settlement which was once common but has been almost entirely dismantled. The barracks is a rare example of workers' accommodation provided by a private timber company.

The place is important in demonstrating the principal characteristics of a particular class of cultural places.

Jimna Single Men's Barracks is representative of the infrastructure of private timber towns. It is important in demonstrating the principal characteristics of the accommodation that was created for the express purpose of housing unmarried timber workers in remote locations. Its features include: a long, gable-roofed timber building containing a row of single rooms serving as men's sleeping quarters and opening onto a building-length verandah, and an intact and distinctively formed cookhouse framed with timber and clad in corrugated iron.

The place has a special association with the life or work of a particular person, group or organisation of importance in Queensland's history.

The Jimna Single Men's Barracks has a strong association with the company, Hancock and Gore Limited, once one of Queensland's largest timber firms, which established the township at Jimna in 1922 for the express purpose of timber retrieval and milling, and which also provided accommodation and services for its employees; functions which continued for approximately 50 years.
