= Monsildale Homestead =

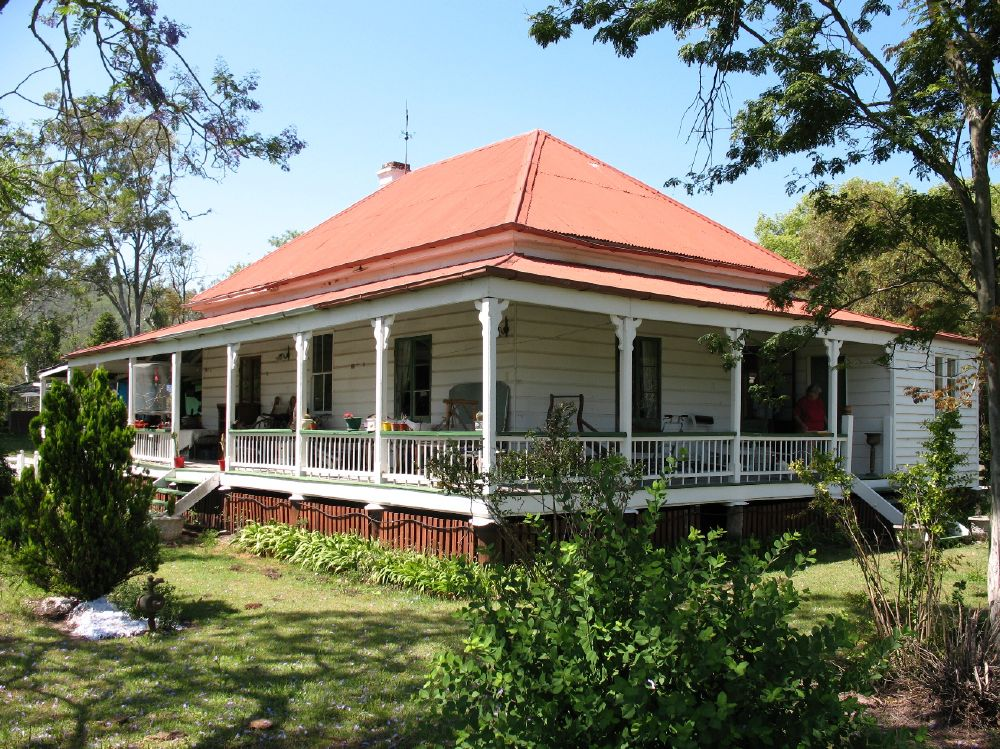
- Monsildale Homestead, 2007

- Location within Queensland Location within Australia
- 26.705216°S 152.397667°E
- Location: 2532 Monsildale Road, Monsildale, Somerset Region, Queensland, Australia

Queensland Heritage Register
- Official name: Monsildale Homestead
- Type: state heritage
- Designated: 3 April 2009
- Reference no.: 602704

Monsildale Homestead is a heritage-listed homestead at 2532 Monsildale Road, Monsildale, Somerset Region, Queensland, Australia. It was added to the Queensland Heritage Register on 3 April 2009.

== History ==
Monsildale Homestead is a grazing property distinguished by a large timber residence which stands in a picturesque setting on a knoll to the east of Monsildale Road, within a loop of Monsildale Creek. The core section of the main residence was built between 1871 and 1877 on land selected by cattle grazier James Steven during the second phase of the settlement of the Brisbane River Valley, and an extension to the south was added by the Horne family, probably during the 1910s. The property was owned by members of the Horne and Woodrow families between c.1912 and 1978, and although the original cattle station has been subdivided and deer are now farmed close to the main residence, the property still runs cattle. A slab timber combined barn and shed still stands to the southeast of the main residence, and east of the barn is a derelict two-room timber single-men's barrack. At some distance to the south of the main residence is a former quarters for Aboriginal workers, which was later used as a piggery. These structures are characteristic elements of a grazier's homestead complex.

The Brisbane River's watershed, of which Monsildale Creek is a part, was one of the earliest areas of Queensland to be settled outside of the Moreton Bay penal settlement. Pastoralists first drove their sheep onto the Darling Downs from New South Wales in 1840, and squatters moved into the Brisbane River Valley the following year. David Cannon McConnel formally established Cressbrook Station in July 1841, and was the first squatter to settle with his stock east of the Great Dividing Range in the future colony of Queensland. He was followed in late 1841 by John Balfour (Colinton Station), the Mackenzie brothers (Kilcoy Station), the Archer brothers (Durundur Station), and the Bigge brothers (Mount Brisbane Station). Pastoralists in the Brisbane River Valley soon switched from sheep to cattle, as sheep were not well suited to the local climate.

In 1848 the northern boundary of Colinton Station was described in the New South Wales Government Gazette as running from a marked tree beyond Mount Stanley to a point on the range at the head of Mackenzie's Sheep Station Creek, and thus the site of the Monsildale property may have fallen within the boundary of Colinton Station. It is also reported that at one stage David O'Connel from Cressbrook station considered grazing at Monsildale, but decided against it. Monsildale was apparently named after the property of David's brother Henry in Derbyshire.

Little else is known about the history of the land around Monsildale until May 1871, when James Steven applied to select a homestead under the Crown Lands Alienation Act 1868. James Steven is not listed in the 1868 Queensland Alphabetical Post Office Directory, nor is he listed under the Squatters or Cattle Graziers sections in the 1874 or 1876 Trades Directories. However, Monsildale is listed under "Stations" in the 1878 to 1879 Trades Directory as being run by Swanson and Steven. Alexander Swanson apparently selected Portion 43, some distance to the south of Monsildale homestead, in partnership with James Steven in 1877.

Alexander was most likely one of the Swanson brothers who established Yabba Station on the Gympie side of the Jimna Range c.1852. Although it was originally stocked with sheep, Yabba was running cattle by the time it was transferred to the Queensland National Bank in 1882. Two men named Swanson and Stevens supposedly discovered the Jimna goldfield in 1860, when the latter was the head stockman at Yabba. This goldfield was gazetted in 1868, and attracted 1500 men at its peak, although by 1871 the population had dropped to 300. It is possible that James Steven was the head stockman at Yabba Station in 1860, and it can be speculated as to whether or not he made his fortune on the Jimna gold field, given the amount of money later spent on his homestead at Monsildale.

The land Steven wanted for his homestead was surveyed by R. Atkinson as Portion 1, Parish of Mount Stanley (later parish of Monsildale), in the County of Canning. In February 1872 it consisted of 22 acres (8.9 ha) of Agricultural land and 116 acres (47 ha) of 1st Class Pastoral land (138 acres (56 ha)). During the 1870s Steven selected thousands of acres in the vicinity, including adjacent portions 2, 3, 11 12, 27 and 44, along with Portion 4 to the south, plus other portions. Donald Steven selected Portion 7 opposite Portion 1. Subdivision of the large pastoral runs to the south of Monsildale also began during the 1870s, and in 1876 the first selections at Hazeldean were excised from the Kilcoy Run. In 1877 closer settlement commenced at Villeneuve with the resumptions out of Durundur holdings.

In March 1875, in a letter to the Commissioner for Crown Lands for West Moreton, Steven requested that his homestead selection be transferred to a conditional purchase, as "it is most likely that other arrangements may soon interfere with my personal residence on the land". In April 1876 a letter to the Commissioner from Steven stated that, as he had spent so much money on one selection at Monsildale (Portion 1), it could be argued that he had met the requirements of the 1868 Act for improving his surrounding selections. His selections were inspected in April 1877, and a report on his fulfilment of the selection conditions regarding Portion 1 was issued in July 1877. In this report, Steven's occupation was listed as "Grazier". Steven applied to purchase in November 1877, and a Deed of Grant was issued in February 1878.

Steven's selections were in an isolated valley, and his homestead needed to be self-contained. A list of Steven's improvements to Portion 1, as inspected in April 1877, included the following: a chamferboard house with shingle roof and verandah all round, containing seven rooms and a hall. Lined and ceiled with cedar, with two brick chimneys and spouted all round, it was valued at £800. There was also a 9000-gallon underground brick and cemented tank and pump valued at £60; and a slab and shingle kitchen containing five rooms, with verandahs front and back, built on piles and enclosed underneath, valued at £100. A slab and shingle store, meat-house, and bathroom with verandah were worth £80; and a second slab and shingle kitchen of two rooms and a verandah was valued at £30. Other outbuildings included a fowl house and piggery (£15); a blacksmith's shop (£20); and a stable with three stalls, two loose boxes, a buggy house, a harness room, a corn loft, spouting all around and a large tank (£150). In addition, there were two men's huts, one of three rooms (£25) and one of two rooms (£20). Along with various fences and gates, there was also a 1.5 acres (0.61 ha) fenced garden which included fruit trees.

Yards included a horse yard, and a milking yard around a calf pen and milking bails. A stockyard enclosed 10 small yards, and included a branding lane, speying bails, a killing yard and gallows. A herding yard was attached. A map of Portion 1 in 1877 shows stockyards near the location of the current stockyards. The existing cattle dip within these yards has the dates 1903 and 1905 carved into posts and rails at the north end of the dip pit.

The history of the homestead selection from this time on can be gleaned from the land titles. Although existing titles for Portion 1 only go back as far as 1926, the ownership of neighbouring portions 2 and 12, just outside the loop of Monsildale Creek, gives a fair indication of events at Monsildale prior to 1926. Steven applied to lease Portion 2 before survey in May 1871 and again in November 1871 (as selection 2024). It was leased from January 1872, and a Deed of Grant for its 321 acres (130 ha) was issued to Steven in February 1878. Steven also applied to lease Portion 12 (selection 2841) before survey in July 1873, and a Deed of Grant for its 1,216 acres (492 ha) was issued in March 1878.

Most of portions 2 and 12 were combined and subdivided in 1880 to form two new holdings. One (964 acres (390 ha)) was located to the north of a road leading east from Monsildale Road, and another (419 acres (170 ha)) was located to the south of this road. In 1882 new joint titles for these holdings were issued to James Steven and Alexander Swanson. In March 1893 both holdings were transferred to the British and Australasian Trust and Loan Company Limited. Information on the history of the district published by the Kilcoy District Historical Society notes that Thomas E. Robertson was at Monsildale in 1895, and that he was listed as property manager from 1904 to 1908. He was probably employed by the British and Australasian Trust and Loan Company Limited.

In 1912 the above holdings were obtained by James Horne, and the titles were transferred to Hornes Limited in 1921. James Horne was born in Newchapel, England in 1861, and he married Elizabeth Maddicks in 1888. Prior to moving to Monsildale the Hornes owned the property Fairlymeade, near Woodford. James Horne also served a term on the Kilcoy Shire Council from 1918. It has been claimed that Horne purchased the Monsildale property in 1908, but this could be confirmed from the titles examined. Portion 1 could have been purchased in 1908, but as pointed out above, the surrounding land was not purchased by Horne until 1912. James Horne is first listed at "Monsildale" in the 1911–1912 Trades Directory of the Queensland Post Office Directory, under the Pastoral and Agricultural section. At this time he had 33 horses and 502 cattle. Horne family photographs in 1913 and 1914 show quite a large family, and the main residence was probably extended to the south soon after Horne purchased the property.

Local knowledge claims that the hut to the south of the homestead at Monsildale (visible in a photograph taken from the south before the homestead was extended) was used as Aboriginal quarters, and there were Aboriginal workers in the area. A photograph taken on Yabba station prior to World War I shows two Aboriginal workers in European dress. Due to shortages of European labour in the nineteenth century, station owners turned to Aboriginal workers, who adapted well to work in the pastoral industry whilst - initially - maintaining aspects of their traditional lifestyle, with the families of workers camping on the stations. By the mid-1880s well over half of the employees on cattle stations in North Queensland were Aboriginal. Later, after a collapse in the Queensland export beef trade in the 1920s led to the removal of non-working dependants from stations and seasonal employment of Aboriginal workers, Aboriginal labour was usually drawn from fringe camps near towns, or from Missions. European and Aboriginal workers were quartered and fed separately, and Aboriginal camps were usually located some distance from the homestead. Aboriginals who were in regular employment and who did not have a strong tie with local Aboriginals might be housed in a station hut.

Although cattle-grazing was the main activity at Monsildale, the area's timber was also a source of local economic activity. At various times between 1912 and 1961 sawmills operated on a flat part of Portion 2, just over the creek to the north of the homestead, on land rented from Horne. A small township developed on the site, between the Monsildale Road and Monsildale Creek to the west, including a store, butcher's shop and a school. When Gladys and Vera Horne attended Monsildale School in 1913, their father was listed as a "Squatter".

By 1920 Graham and Vera Horne (née Hunter), and Harry and Grace Woodrow (née Horne) were running Monsildale Station, as James Horne had retired. Harry Woodrow, born in 1885, had married Grace Horne (born 1898) in 1917. Harry worked in the Gympie gold mines between 1901 and 1911 before becoming the first cadet taken on by the Queensland Forestry Department. He then acted as a Forest Ranger in the Little Yabba area near Jimna before working at Monsildale and meeting Grace. After they married, the couple lived at Blackbutt, and then Nanango.

In 1920 Grace bought her sisters out of their land in the southern portion of Monsildale, and cleared it of timber. At this time Harry joined Hancock and Gore at Monsildale as their scrub boss, retiring from the Forestry Department. Harry and Grace had a large house of their own, across the road and to the north of the homestead, where they lived for four years. The stumps of this house are still visible. Harry helped to locate and inspect Hancock and Gore's new mill site at Foxlowe, along with Gympie Land Ranger George Carter and Boy MacDonald of Yabba station. Harry was also a Kilcoy Shire Councillor between 1933 and 1946, and was one of the first three trustees of the Jimna Hall, which was built in 1934.

The Horne family continued to operate Monsildale as a large cattle property. In the 1923–1924 Trades Directory, Hornes Limited is listed at Monsildale (under the Nanango District) with 1231 cattle, and when Horne's Limited Monsildale Estate was auctioned on 16 May 1924, it consisted of 9,000 acres (3,600 ha) of freehold grazing land (stretching from Portion 24 in the south to Portion 44 in the north) which had been subdivided into 17 farms. About 1000 cattle and 50 horses were also for sale. At the auction, Harry and Grace Woodrow purchased a lot of the land, including the land of former Portion 1. In June 1924 Queensland Trustees Limited was appointed liquidator to wind up Hornes Limited, and the Deed of Grant for Portion 1 was surrendered to the Crown in November 1925, before being re-issued to Queensland Trustees in October 1926. However, the title was then altered to read "Hornes Limited, its Successors". The same sequence of events occurred for the two holdings outside the loop of Monsildale Creek.

Harry and Grace moved into the homestead's main residence after they purchased the former Portion 1. George Atthow bought a block of the Monsildale Estate, and Alf Stanton also purchased two blocks, one of which contained Woodrow's old house, which was removed in 1942. These three blocks were later sold to Harry Runge.

In November 1935 that part of the former Portion 1 located east of the Monsildale road (a total of 112 acres (45 ha) and 20.6 perches (520 m^{2})), was transferred from Horne's Limited to Harry Woodrow. Harry died in 1956, and the land passed to Grace in 1959. The land was transferred to Grace, James and Robert Woodrow in 1966, and finally to James Woodrow alone in 1976. This land was subdivided in 1978, and the section which contained the homestead complex and 109 acres (44 ha) within the loop of Monsildale Creek was sold to Peter Kurts Developments Pty Limited before being immediately on-sold to Trevor D. Hawkins in May 1978. The Hawkins used the homestead as a holiday home for children. The house, its outbuildings, and 109 acres (44 ha) was transferred to Dawn Evans and Ian Mac Lachlan in June 1984, and in 2007 Dawn Evans owned the main residence as part of a 611-acre farm which included parts of former portions 1, 2, 12 and 27. In 2007 the land within the loop of the creek was used to raise deer, and the rest ran beef cattle.

The remainder of the homestead land, containing 3.3 acres (1.3 ha) and the stockyards and cattle dip to the north of the homestead, was transferred to Peter Kurts Development Pty Ltd in June 1978, and then immediately transferred to new owners. Grace Woodrow died in 1983, but members of the Woodrow family still farm to the north of Monsildale at "Cowah".

Changes to the main residence over time include the large 1910s extension to the south of Steven's original 1870s residence, and the 1870s section appears to have been was raised off the ground on round logs and stumps, with a new balustrade, at this time. The extension's western verandah balustrade is original, but the balustrade around the original residence has lost its top rail. An extension has also been made to the east side of the verandah around the original residence.

The main door in the centre of the north elevation of the 1870s core of the residence has been replaced with a window, and the western chimney has been removed. The central north–south hallway in the core has been incorporated into the north-western room, and the core now includes four rooms (two bedrooms, one lounge, and one study), plus a small southern hall that is open to the western verandah of the 1910s extension. There is also a boxroom on the southern end of the western verandah of the 1870s residence. The southern verandah of the 1910s extension has been enclosed by the current owner, who has also expanded a part of the kitchen to the north. A large coloured-glass window has been added between the kitchen and living room in the 1910s section of the residence.

A gate in the fence to the north of the house, and its associated steps, has disappeared, as has a tennis court that used to exist to the west of the house. There is no sign of the 1870s underground brick tank, and its location is not known. The south end of the combined barn and shed to the southeast of the residence was flattened by a falling tree branch in a storm in 2007, and the roof has been reconstructed. The same storm removed the roof and verandah of a two-room single men's barrack located to the east of the garage, and the barrack was knocked off its stumps and was deposited to south. The roof of the former quarters for Aboriginal workers was also lost in the storm.

== Description ==
On the east side of Monsildale Road approximately 30 kilometres (19 mi) north-northwest of Kilcoy, Monsildale Homestead occupies undulating land within a loop of Monsildale Creek. Approaching along Monsildale Road, the view is dominated by the homestead's main house and associated outbuildings set within a backdrop of treed mountains, undulating fenced paddocks and lush river flats. The homestead complex consists of the main house, slab barn and shed, single men's barrack and former Aboriginal quarters. There are a number of striking mature trees in the house yard including jacarandas, silky oaks, pines and eucalypts. Monsildale Creek makes a wide loop around the property. A vehicle shed southeast of the barracks is not of heritage significance.

The property is entered by a driveway to the west of the residence off Monsildale Road.

=== Main house ===
Standing on a grassed knoll, the distinctive white-painted main house consists of the early 1870s core to the north and an L-shaped extension (c.1912) to the south. Timber framed and sheltered by hipped and gabled roofs clad with red painted corrugated iron, the house stands on low timber stumps. Once entered through the main entrance door to the north and organised around a central hall, the house now functions as a series of rooms operating off verandahs which run around the west, north and east of the house. A recently enclosed verandah to the south functions as an informal entrance.

The early house comprises a living room, two bedrooms (northeast and southwest), study/library, box room and porch. A short hall links the early house with the extension. The extension consists of a bedroom, living room, office, enclosed verandah and a service wing of kitchen, bathroom, store, toilet and laundry.

A 2.4-metre (7 ft 10 in) wide verandah runs around the west, north and east of the early house, and has dowel balustrading with the handrail sitting on the top rail and bold Y-shaped moulded brackets to the posts. Timber steps alight from the north side and west sides. An extended verandah at the northeast corner has weatherboard infill balustrading. The west and east verandahs to the south extension have dowel balustrading, with a handrail separate from the top rail and only the west verandah has the Y-shaped brackets matching those on the early verandah. There is a batten infill to the understoreys of the early house and the extension.

The earlier part of the house is timber-framed, clad with 220-millimetre (8.7 in) chamferboards and lined with 230-millimetre (9.1 in) vertical beaded tongue and groove boards in the former hall, to the ceiling of the living room and parts of the porch; and narrower unbeaded boards line the other spaces. The box room, the south wall of the south bedroom and the study in the extension are clad with weatherboards. The early main entrance is infilled with timber boards and a sash window. A doorway from the hall into the east bedroom is infilled with timber boards and infilling to the south wall of the living room indicates the location of an earlier fireplace. The coved ceiling to the south bedroom is lined with beaded timber boards. The south bedroom interior walls and parts of the porch are lined with a textured fibre board over earlier timber boards. The east bedroom has a fireplace with a polished timber surround. The early part of the house is distinguished by wide elaborately moulded skirting boards. French doors (some painted, some varnished) open out onto the verandahs and sash windows have narrow glazing mullions.

The extension is of post and rail construction lined with vertical timber boards. Mortice and tenon joints are visible in the window and door framing. Painted French doors open out onto the verandahs. The arrangement of timber boards in the ceiling indicates that the large bedroom may earlier have been two rooms. A large picture window is inserted in the west wall of the living room and a coloured glass window inserted between the living room and kitchen to the east. The kitchen has been upgraded with new joinery, stove and other kitchen equipment and appliances. A narrow verandah with a balustrade infilled with horizontal weatherboards runs along the north of the wing accommodating the kitchen and service areas.

The house yard is marked by a low horizontal timber boarded fence painted white.

=== Slab barn and shed ===
Standing to the southeast of the main house within the house yard, the slab barn and shed are sheltered by a gable roof recently clad with new corrugated metal sheeting. The timber slabs to the east and north walls are set into bedlogs and notched to take top rails. Sheets of corrugated iron cover a window opening in the east wall and an open doorway stands to the middle of this side of the building. The north elevation has two entrances and a pair of casement windows to the northwest end. The north gable is infilled with weatherboards. The west wall of the barn and shed is clad with weatherboards and has two timber door entrances and a metal tilt-a-door. The south end of the shed is open, timber-framed, partly clad with weatherboards and has a timber floor. The west and south sides of the building stand on low timber stumps. The roof throughout is framed with log beams and sawn timber rafters and battens and is supported by log posts. The floor of the slab barn is dirt to the north with a concrete slab to the middle. A small room with a raised timber floor and internal slab walls to the east and south sits within the barn to the northwest corner. A timber-framed skillion extension to the southeast is clad with weatherboards and accommodates a small office and storage room. The slabs are painted with red oxide and weatherboards are white painted.

=== Single men's barrack ===
East of the slab barn and shed, the roofless remains of the single men's barrack stand on temporary props, the building having been dislodged from its stumps during a violent storm. Rectangular in plan, the barrack consists of two rooms each entered by a door from the south and separated by an internal partition with a single doorway between the rooms. The building is timber-framed, has a timber floor, is clad with weatherboards and unlined except for vertical timber boards around the north window in the west room. There is a window with sunhood to each short end and to each room on the north side. Salvaged roof framing and sheeting is stacked adjacent to the propped building (one piece of roof sheeting remains caught high in a nearby tree).

=== Aboriginal quarters ===
The former Aboriginal quarters is a timber-framed building, once sheltered by a gable roof with skillion roofs extending to the north and south, that stands in a paddock some 240 metres (790 ft) south of the main house. The roof framing and corrugated iron roof sheeting has blown off in a violent storm and lies stacked nearby. The north wall is constructed of vertical timber slabs set into a bedlog and notched to take a top rail; a concrete half wall stands to the west, and the south and east walls are clad with corrugated galvanised iron. The building has concrete floors, upstands and drains, and metal gates and fences remaining from its use as a piggery.

=== Other structures ===
The cattle dip and yards once associated with the homestead are extensively altered and not included within the heritage listing.

== Heritage listing ==
Monsildale Homestead was listed on the Queensland Heritage Register on 3 April 2009 having satisfied the following criteria.

The place is important in demonstrating the evolution or pattern of Queensland's history.

The Monsildale Homestead is a product of the second phase of settlement in the Brisbane River Valley, an early and important area of cattle-raising in Queensland. Monsildale was settled in the 1870s, at a time when parts of the nearby large squatter's runs of the 1840s were being resumed for closer settlement under the Crown Lands Alienation Act 1868.

The establishment of Monsildale run reflected both the push towards closer settlement at the time and also the conflicting need to aggregate selections to form viable cattle runs.

The land has been in continuous use for pastoral purposes since the 1870s. Although the size of the station's land holdings has varied over the years, and the property surrounding the main residence has shrunk to 611 acres (247 ha), grazing still occurs on Monsildale homestead and on its former lands to the north and south.

The place is important in demonstrating the principal characteristics of a particular class of cultural places.

Monsildale Homestead with its complex of structures and yards including the main residence (1870s, with 1910s extension), slab barn and shed (pre-1910s), single men's barracks, and Aboriginal workers' quarters (sited at a distance from the main buildings, pre 1910s) comprises elements typical of a grazier's homestead complex. The main residence in its layout and use of a range and quality of timbers and construction techniques is a good example of a substantial late 19th-century grazier's home expanded in the early 20th century to accommodate a large family.
