= Linville War Memorial =

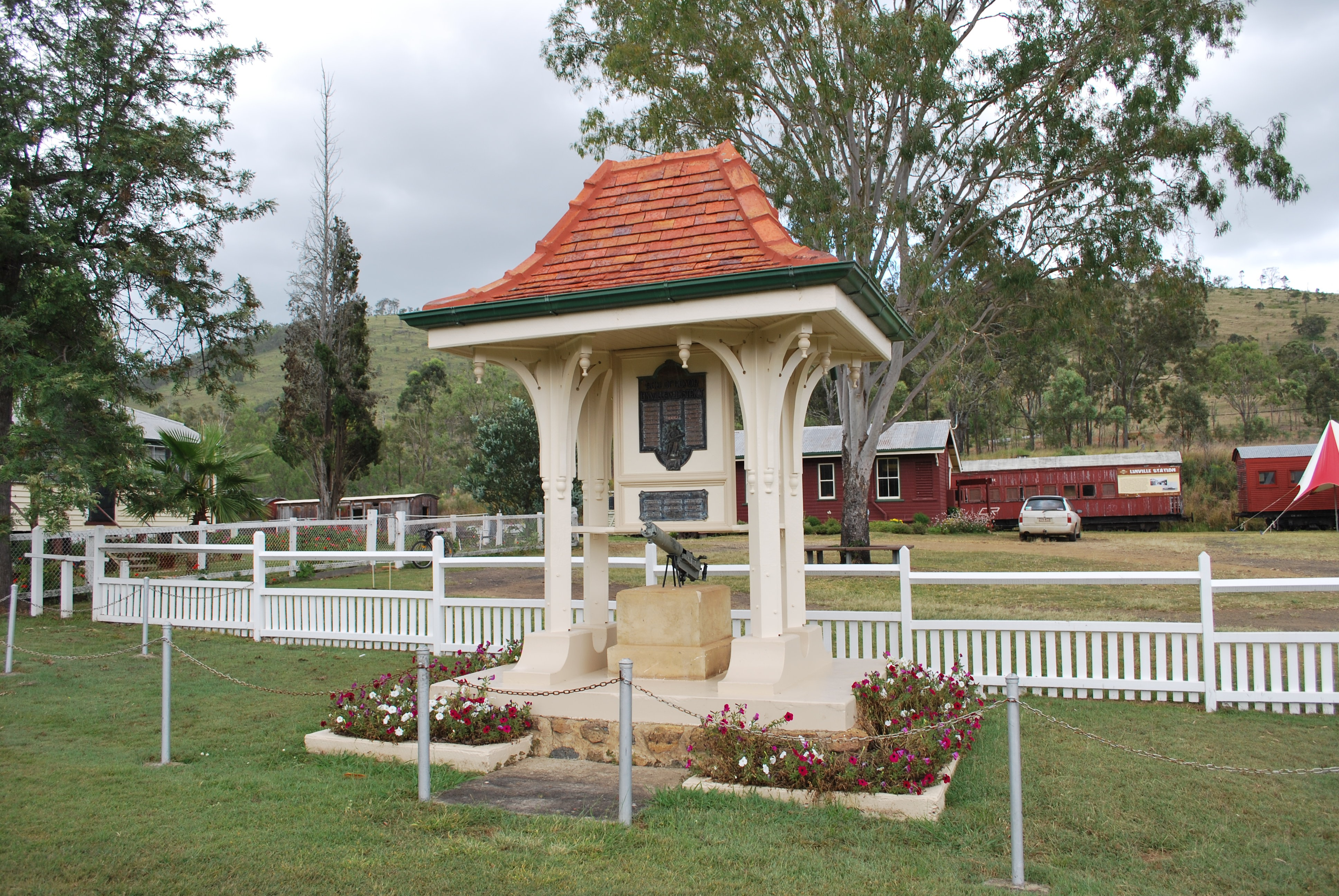
- Linville War Memorial, 2010

- Location within Queensland Location within Australia
- 26.8436°S 152.2765°E
- Location: George Street, Linville, Somerset Region, Queensland, Australia

History
- Design period: 1914–1919 (World War I)
- Built: 1921

Site notes
- Architect: Tom Cross

Queensland Heritage Register
- Official name: Linville War Memorial
- Type: state heritage (built)
- Designated: 11 December 2008
- Reference no.: 602701
- Significant period: 1914–1921
- Significant components: memorial – gun, memorial – honour board/ roll of honour, memorial – cenotaph
- Builders: Frank and Jim Cross

Linville War Memorial is a heritage-listed memorial at George Street, Linville, Somerset Region, Queensland, Australia. It was designed by Tom Cross and built in 1921 by his brothers Frank and Jim Cross. The Memorial was unveiled on 1 August 1922 with Mr A Smith (Chairman of the Esk Shire Council) presiding. It was added to the Queensland Heritage Register on 11 December 2008.

== History ==
The Linville War Memorial is a small timber structure with a terracotta-tiled roof, prominently located in road reserve adjacent to the railway reserve, opposite the store, hotel and Progress Hall. It was designed by Linville photographer, cartoonist, artist and World War I veteran, Tom Cross, and constructed in the early 1920s by his brothers Frank and Jim, with materials donated by the community. The memorial commemorates all local volunteers who served in World War I including eight young men from Linville who did not return. The names of the fallen appear on one side of the panel and are listed in the newspaper article of the unveiling.

The Town of Linville is situated on what was earlier part of Colinton Run, taken up by the Balfour Brothers in 1841. Colinton lands were opened for selection in 1897, and closer settlement around what is now Linville intensified following the announcement in 1900 that the Brisbane Valley Branch Railway was to be extended to Moore. The line to Toogoolawah opened on 8 February 1904. Yimbun became the terminus in September 1904 and a further 45k extension was authorised on 1 April 1908, including a 300 metres (980 ft) climb to Linville. Colinton School was established in 1901, but was renamed Linville in 1906. The Town of Linville was surveyed privately c. 1909 and offered for sale, with the first land transfers occurring from April 1910. The railway line reached the town later in the year. This further cemented the dairying industry in the region allowing easier access to local dairy factories. A sawmill opened in the town in 1912.

One of the first selectors in the district was William Cross of Ipswich, who took up Portion 106V in February 1897. In 1898 some of his family moved to the new property, which they named Crossdale. Son Tom was 15 at the time. When his older brother Ben came to live on the family property in 1906, Tom decided to relocate to Ipswich to pursue his artistic interests, taking a job in a photographic studio and producing artworks in his spare time. He later moved to Sydney to study art, while continuing to work in photography.

During the Great War (1914–1918) twenty-four Linville men – some as young as 18 – volunteered for service overseas. Eight of them never returned. For the small community of Linville this was a significant loss.

Ben and Tom Cross joined the services in 1915. During the war years, Tom became well known for his cartoons and drawings depicting life aboard the troop ships, training in Egypt and scenes of the battlefields of France and Belgium. Some were reproduced as postcards, and he reportedly sold six thousand of these. Others were published in Punch magazine. Many are now held by the Australian War Memorial. Tom suffered from "trench feet", a form of frostbite, which was to plague him for years after he returned home in 1919. Ben gave his life in the service of his country.

During and immediately after the Great War, local communities across Australia began working towards the erection of memorials to those who had served in the war. The impact had been significant with 60,000 men lost from a population of about four million, representing one in five men of those who served. Many were not buried in cemeteries. The construction of a local memorial was often the only tangible reminder of servicemen who lay in graves and battlefields across Europe and the Middle East, and the memorials were considered sacred.

Australian War Memorials are unique in that they generally honour all who served, not just those who died. Australians were proud that their first great national army was composed entirely of volunteers. All who served were considered worthy of honour whether or not they made the supreme sacrifice. Many memorials honour all who served from a locality, providing valuable evidence of community involvement in the war. This evidence is not readily available from military records, or from state or national listings, where names are categorised alphabetically or by military unit. Linville is one such memorial.

Tom Cross designed the Linville War Memorial, which was built by his brothers Frank, a cabinetmaker, and Jim. Frank managed the project in which all of the materials, labour and construction were donated by local people. The memorial was not completed for ANZAC Day in 1921 as a newspaper article indicates that Linville residents attended the unveiling of Toogoolawah's machine gun trophy on Sunday 24 April 1921.

In May 1921, the Linville community was allocated a war trophy. The collection of war trophies was coordinated through the Australian War Records Section and was initially carried out in accordance with the British War Office regulations. The British government assumed it would select the best trophies for the British National War Museum, but the Australian Government objected, insisting that the trophies claimed by their troops should be made available to them. In 1919 it was decided that the Australian War Museum (later the Australian War Memorial) should retain the larger trophies and the smaller ones be distributed to Australian towns according to the size and population of the town. Small towns with a population of between 300 and 3,000, such as Linville, were allocated a machine gun. Consideration was given to allocating trophies captured by units raised in a particular area. Linville was allocated a German machine gun captured in April 1918 by the 9th Battalion to which 5 local men had been attached.

The procurement of a war trophy may have expedited the process of building the Linville memorial, because the Queensland State War Trophy Committee specified that a war trophy was to be an integral part of the local memorial. The design of a memorial became contentious also, with New South Wales establishing a War Memorials Advisory Board attempting to influence the design process to stem the tide of "inartistic" memorials being erected. While Queensland did not regulate design and construction, the Queensland Institute of Architects regretted the "deplorable artistic character of many war memorials recently erected in Queensland". The design for the Linville War Memorial, prepared by local artist Tom Cross, would have adequately appeased this desire for quality public memorial design.

On 1 August 1922 the unveiling of the war memorial was reported in the Daily Mail.

The memorial remains in its original location in the centre of Linville. Repair work to the memorial was commissioned by Somerset Regional Council in 2008.

== Description ==
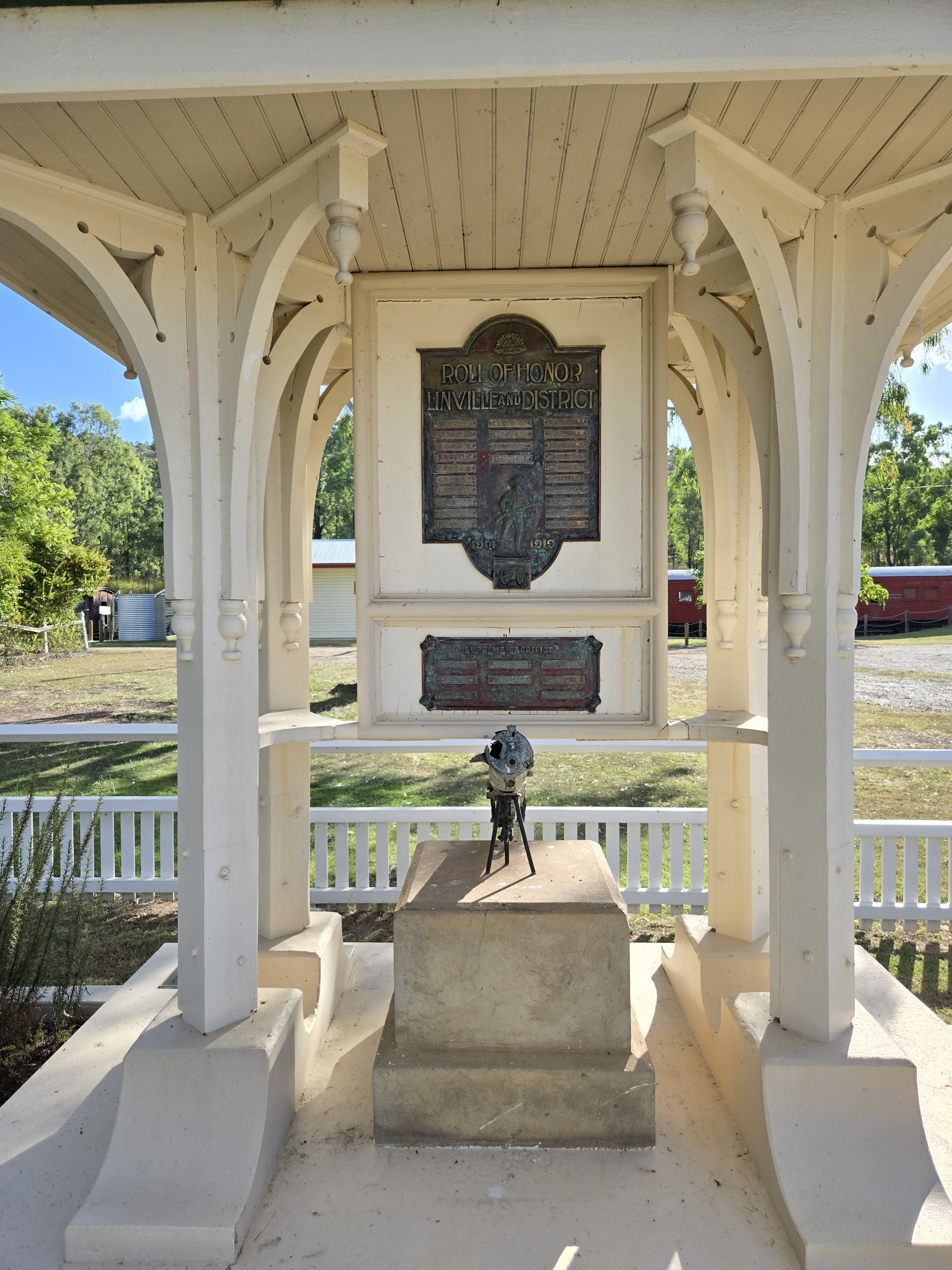
Honour Board Plaque

The Linville War Memorial is a timber structure on a stone and concrete base. It is located in the road reserve and situated parallel to the railway fence, 1.4 metres (4 ft 7 in) from the fence. It is 4 metres (13 ft) wide and 2.7 metres (8 ft 10 in) deep. The pagoda-style roof is clad in terracotta shingles and has terracotta ridge capping. The timber support posts have been set diagonally to allow for four decorative brackets on each corner. The two southern posts appear to be replacements as they are set on metal saddle brackets, whereas the northern posts are set within the curved concrete supports. These supports sit on a concrete slab which then sits on an exposed stonewall footing. Small gardens border the north and south of the footings.

The honour board is copper attached to a timber backing board with the roll of honour facing the street (east). A second plaque below this honours those who made the supreme sacrifice. On the western side facing the railway line, back to back with the honour board is a shield – "Linville's tribute to the memory of the brave". Also on the western face is another plaque describing the machine gun which is set in concrete at base of the memorial: "German machine gun captured on the Western Front by the 9th Battalion AIF 11-4-1918". The timber supports for the honour board backing board are also in poor repair and in need of remedial work. The machine gun is set in a concrete block painted to resemble sandstone.

== Heritage listing ==
Linville War Memorial was listed on the Queensland Heritage Register on 11 December 2008 having satisfied the following criteria.

The place is important in demonstrating the evolution or pattern of Queensland's history.

War memorials are important in demonstrating the pattern of Queensland's history as they are representative of periods of turmoil and loss that affected communities throughout the State. They provide evidence of an era of widespread Australian patriotism and nationalism, particularly during and following World War 1. The war memorial at Linville, recording the names of the 24 local men who served during the war, one-third of whom did not return, illustrates the impact of this war on one small Queensland rural community, and is indicative of a pattern that occurred throughout the State.

The place demonstrates rare, uncommon or endangered aspects of Queensland's cultural heritage.

The monument manifests a unique and enduring documentary record of the involvement of the Linville community in an international event.

The place is important in demonstrating an uncommon aspect of Queensland's history, being designed by local returned serviceman Tom Cross. The design of the Linville War Memorial is uncommon in Queensland, and being designed by a returned serviceman for his local community was equally uncommon. War memorials of this era were more likely to be the work of a commissioned architect or stonemason.

The place is important in demonstrating the principal characteristics of a particular class of cultural places.

The Linville War Memorial demonstrates the principal characteristics of a World War I memorial: the inclusion of a memorial plaque to local residents who served in World War 1; the integration of the machine gun war trophy into the design; and the prominent location.

The place is important because of its aesthetic significance.

The memorial in its setting is of aesthetic significance for its quality of design, workmanship and use of materials.

The place has a strong or special association with a particular community or cultural group for social, cultural or spiritual reasons.

The Linville War Memorial has a strong association with the local community as evidence of a major historic event and a focal point for the remembrance of that event.
