= Linville, Queensland =

Linville
- Town
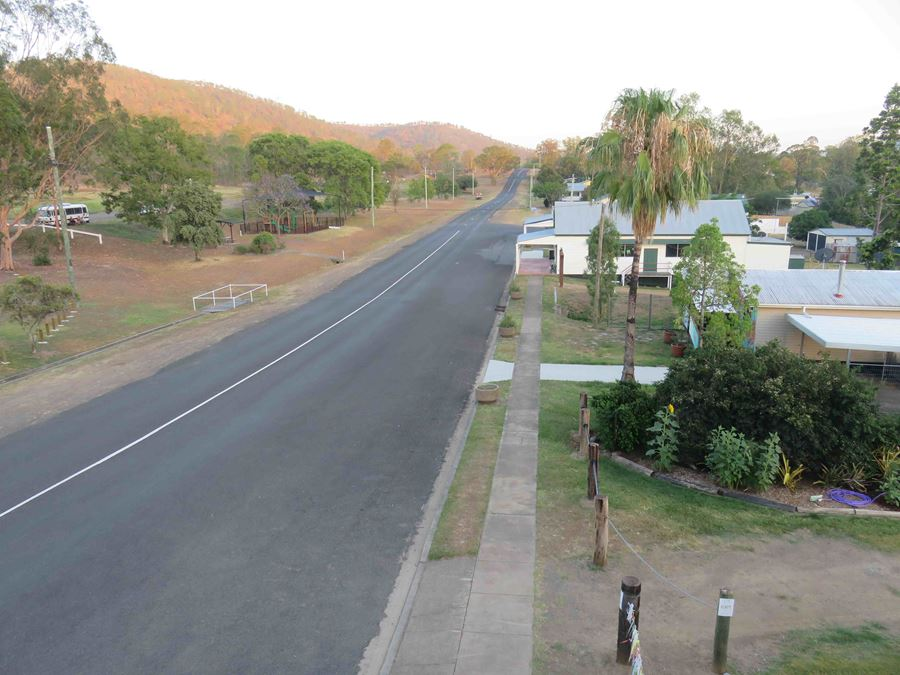
- Linville main street from the Linville Hotel, 2021

- Interactive map of Linville
- Coordinates: 26.8419°S 152.2769°E
- Country: Australia
- State: Queensland
- LGA: Somerset Region
- Location: 39.7 km (24.7 mi) NW of Kilcoy; 50.8 km (31.6 mi) N of Esk; 64.9 km (40.3 mi) SE of Nanango; 141 km (88 mi) NW of Brisbane
- Established: 1901

Government
  - State electorate: Nanango
  - Federal division: Blair

Area
  - Total: 145.0 km^{2} (56.0 sq mi)

Population
  - Total: 133 (2021 census)
  - Density: 0.917/km^{2} (2.376/sq mi)
- Time zone: UTC+10:00 (AEST)
- Postcode: 4314
- County: Cavendish
- Parish: Colinton
Localities around Linville
Taromeo	Avoca Vale	Monsildale
Taromeo	Linville	Sheep Station Creek
Moore	Moore	Moore

Linville is a rural town and locality in the Somerset Region, Queensland, Australia. In the 2021 census, the locality of Linville had a population of 133 people.

== History ==
On 19 August 1841, the Balfour brothers - John, Charles and Robert, took up Colinton run which included the present site of the town of Linville. The Balfours originally intended to build their homestead where Linville now stands but decided to establish it instead about 10 kilometres (6.2 mi) to the south, near where Emu Creek enters the Brisbane River.

During their occupancy of Colinton the Balfours built stockyards on the north bank of Greenhide Creek near its junction with the Brisbane River. The yards became known as "Nine Mile Yards". By about 1886 a small private township grew up at the spot and the Nine Mile Receiving Office opened there in 1898. The name was used up till 1901.

Surveyor E.M. Waraker laid out a town at Nine Mile and the plans of sections 2 to 7 of the town, to be known as Linton, were lodged with the Survey office on 6 December 1901. Linton was situated about 1 kilometre (0.62 mi) south east of where Linville now stands. Local residents wanted the name Linton, which was formed by dropping the syllable "Co" from "Colinton". The postal authorities did not favour this as there was already a place in Victoria called Linton, 30 kilometres (19 mi) west-south-west of Ballarat. A compromise was reached and at the request of residents the name of the receiving office was changed to Linville in November 1905; it became a post office in January 1910.

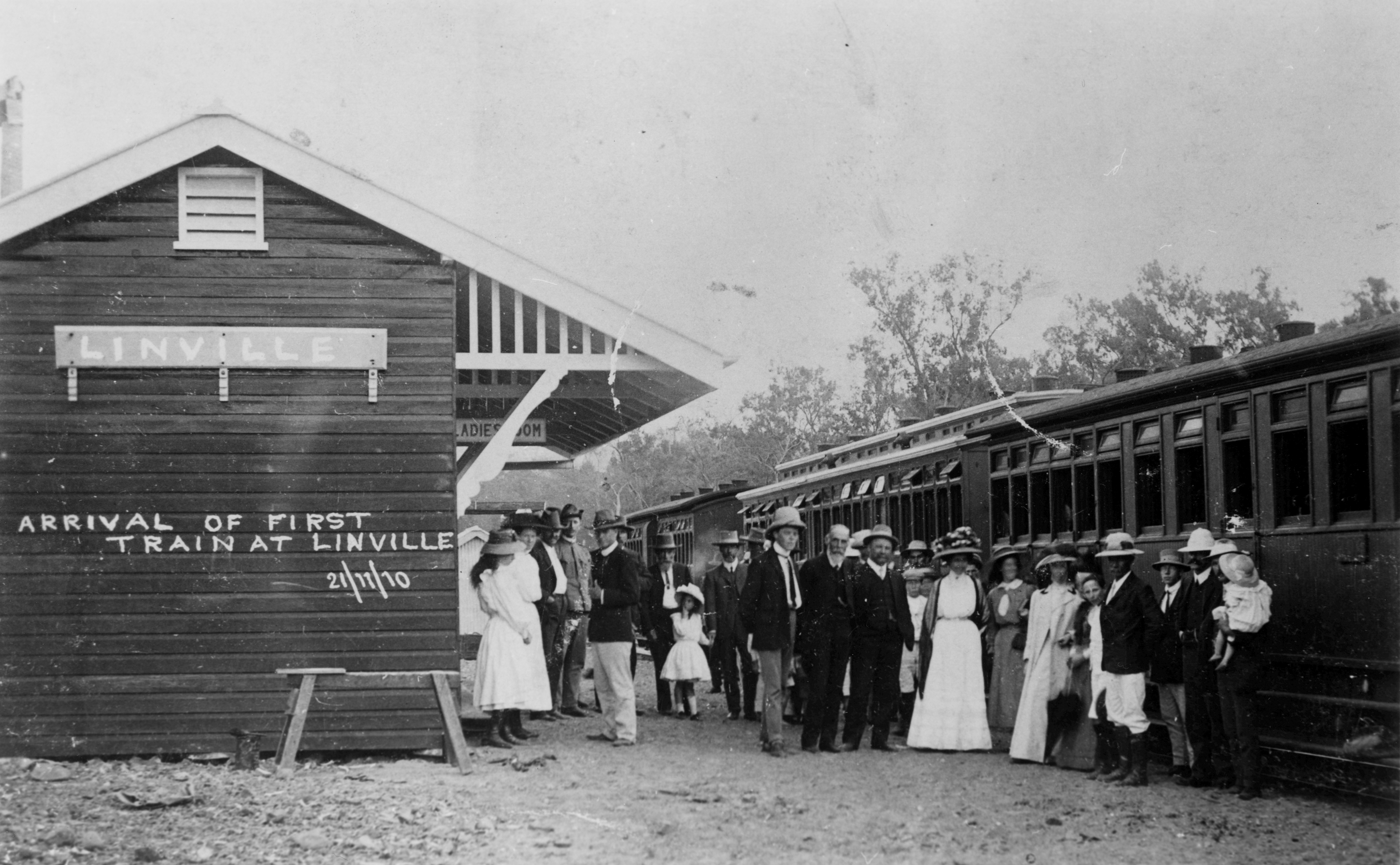
Arrival of first train at Linville Station, 1910

In 1910, the Brisbane Valley railway line was extended from Toogoolawah to Linville with Linville railway station (26.8438°S 152.2757°E) serving the town. The railway line closed in 1989.

The railway link allowed the timber industry to develop, with a sawmill opening in 1912 and logging continuing to be an important industry until the 1950s when cattle grazing become the predominant local industry. In 1920 some of the land was allocated to returning soldiers, some of whom setup dairy farms.

Colinton Provisional School opened on 11 November 1901. In April 1905, it was renamed Oakey Provisional School. In September 1906, it was renamed Linville Provisional School. It became Linville State School in 1909.

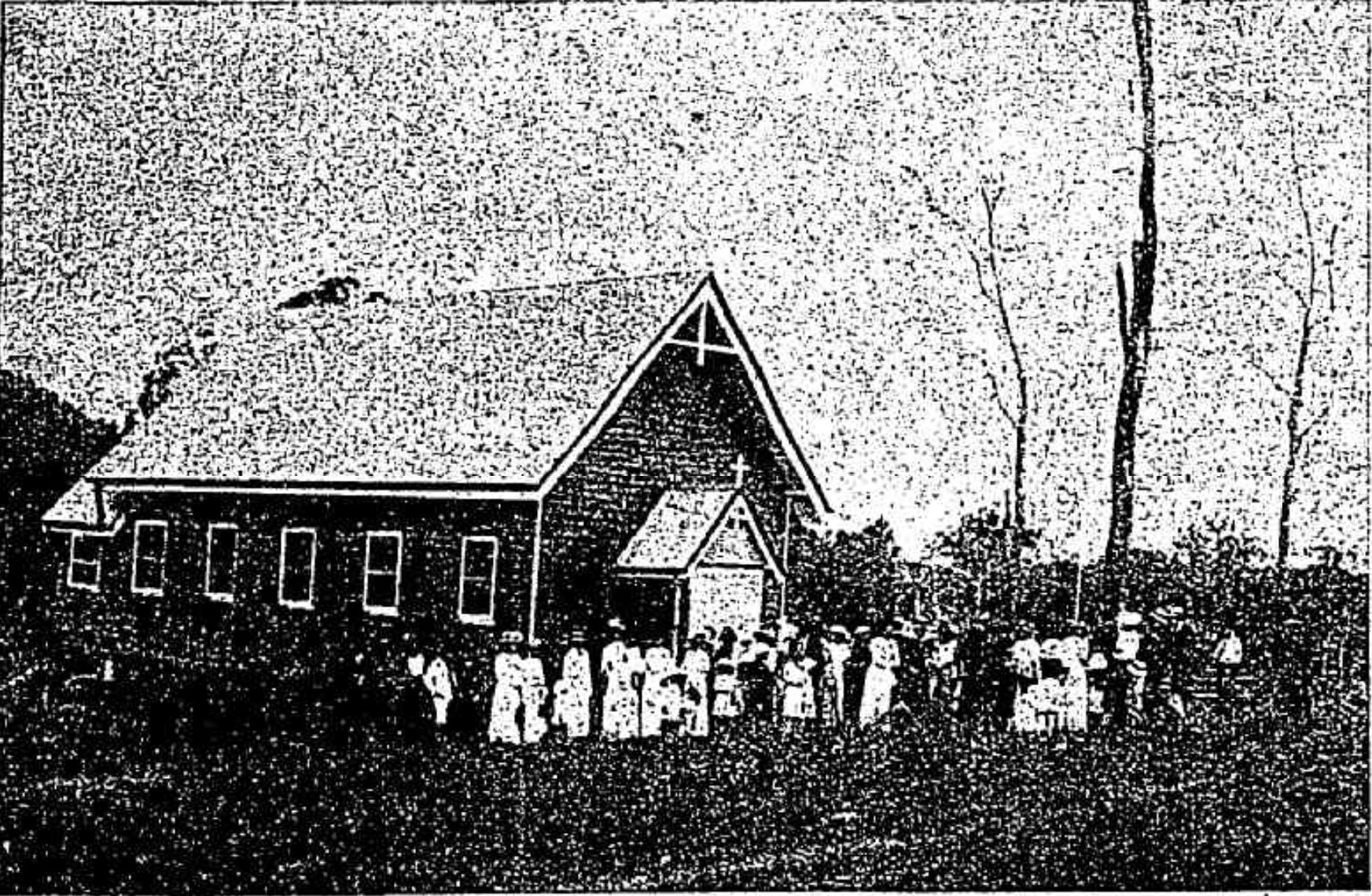
Opening of St George's Anglican Church, 19 April 1915

St George's Anglican Church was dedicated on Monday 19 April 1915 by Archbishop St Clair Donaldson. It was at 52 David Street (26.8396°S 152.2760°E). It was sold on 1 June 2020 for $134,200. It was converted into a private residence.

On 1 August 1922, the chairman of the Esk Shire Council, Mr A. Smith, unveiled the Linville War Memorial in George Street; it commemorates those from the district who served in World War I.

On Sunday 1 October 1927, the Linville Methodist Church was opened and dedicated by local minister Reverend Thomas Burgess. The church building was 30 by 20 feet (9.1 by 6.1 m).

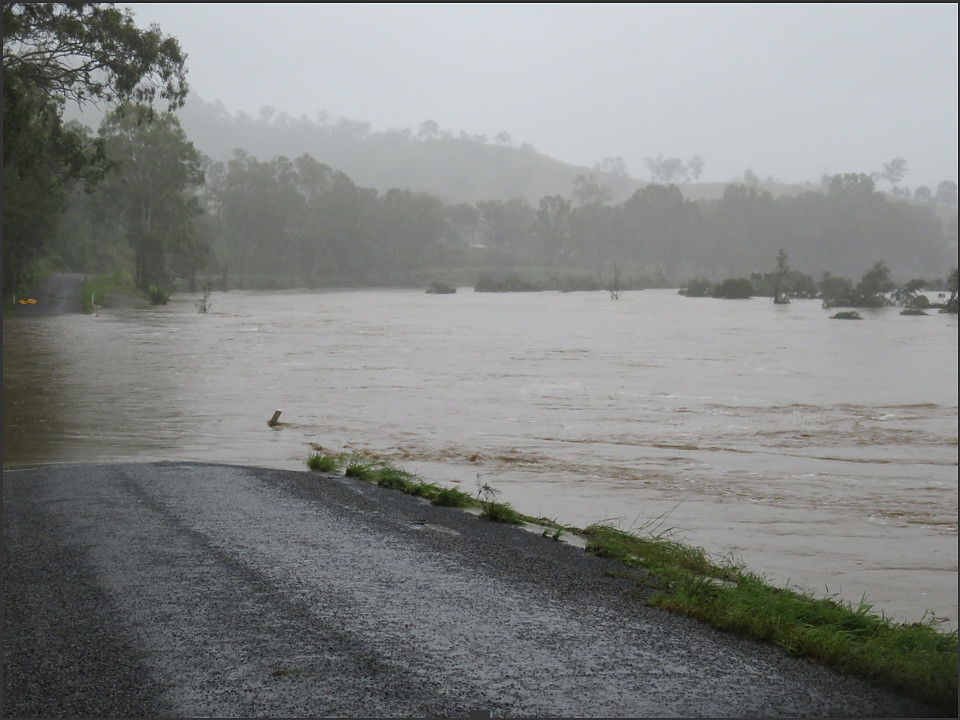
Brisbane River in flood, Linville, 2022

On 1 February 2018, Linville's postcode changed from 4306 to 4314.

== Demographics ==
In the 2006 census, the locality of Linville had a population of 110 people.

In the 2011 census, the locality of Linville and surrounding districts had a population of 431 people.

In the 2016 census, the locality of Linville had a population of 156 people.

In the 2021 census, the locality of Linville had a population of 133 people.

== Heritage listings ==
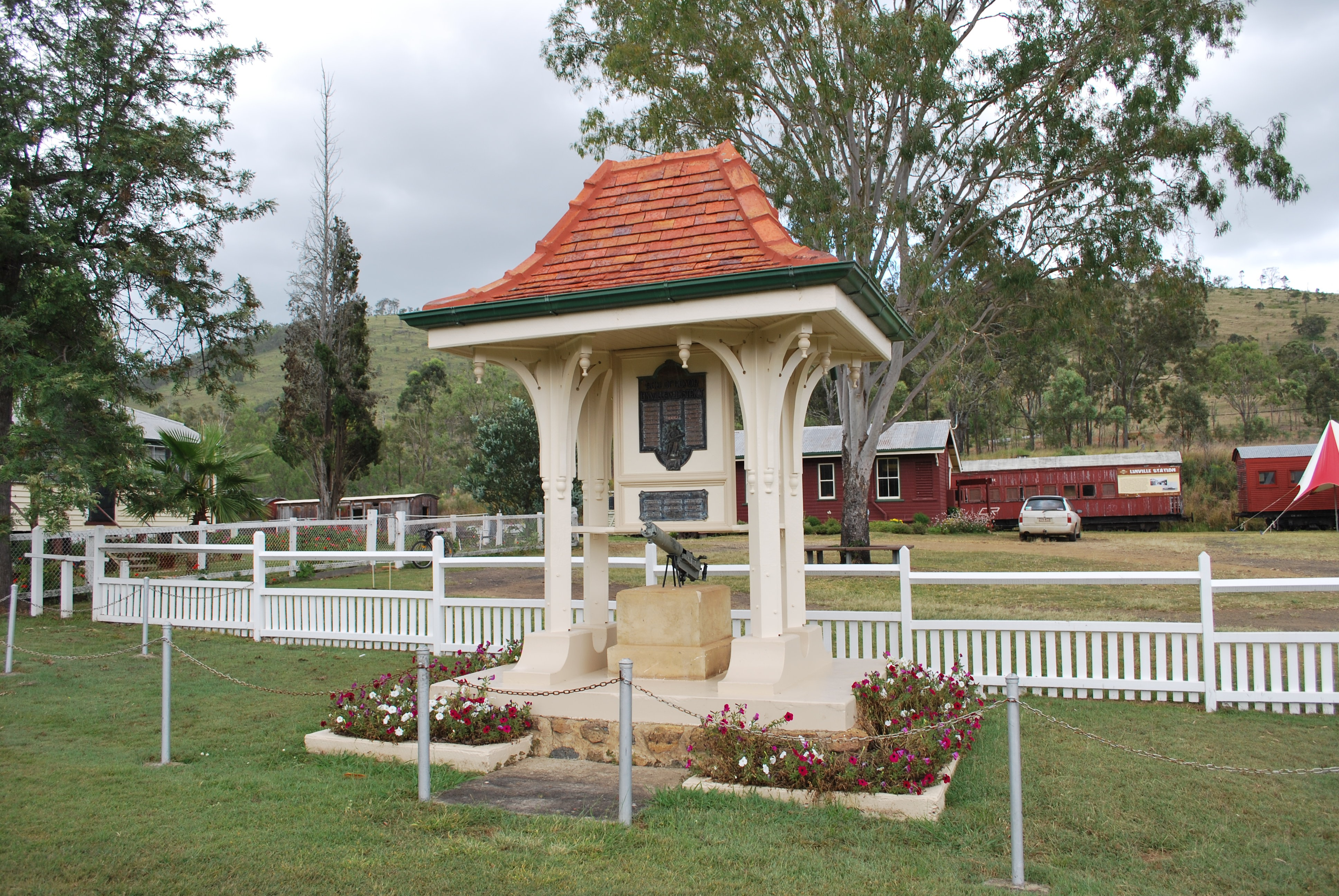
Linville War Memorial, 2010

Linville has a number of heritage-listed sites, including:

- Linville War Memorial, George Street (26.8436°S 152.2765°E)

== Education ==
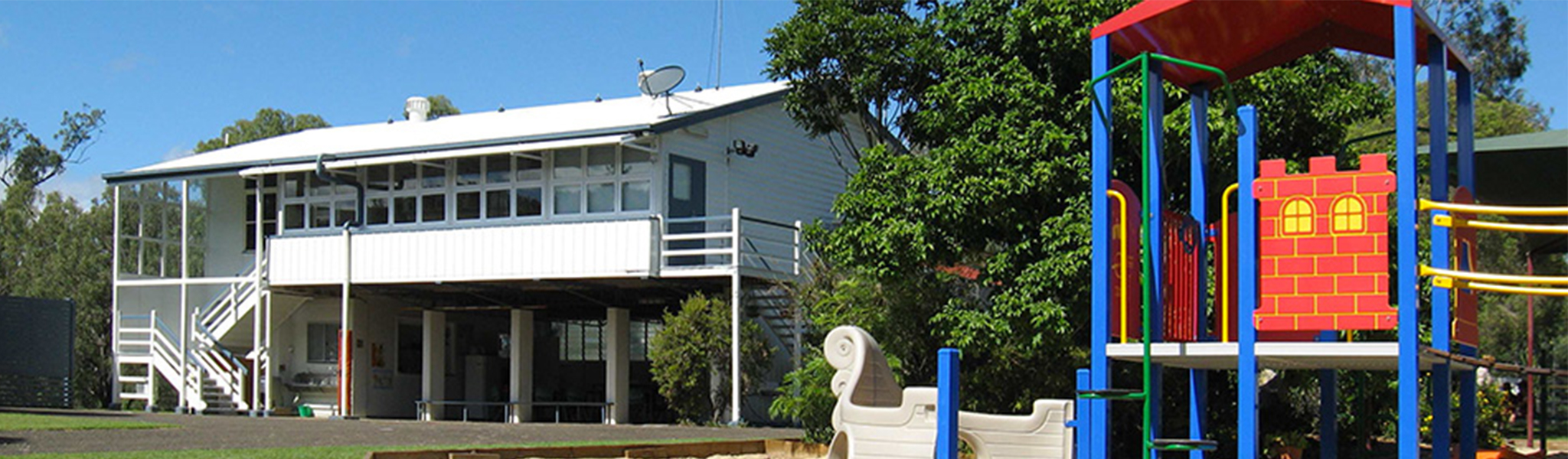
Linville State School, 2025

Linville State School is a government primary (Prep–6) school for boys and girls at 15 Wells Street (corner of George Street, 26.8467°S 152.2784°E). In 2018, the school had an enrolment of 28 students with six teachers (three full-time equivalent) and six non-teaching staff (two full-time equivalent).

There are no secondary schools in Linville. The nearest government secondary schools are Toogoolawah State High School in Toogoolawah to the south and Kilcoy State High School in Kilcoy to the south-east.

== Economy ==
There is a timber mill in Linville.

== Amenities ==
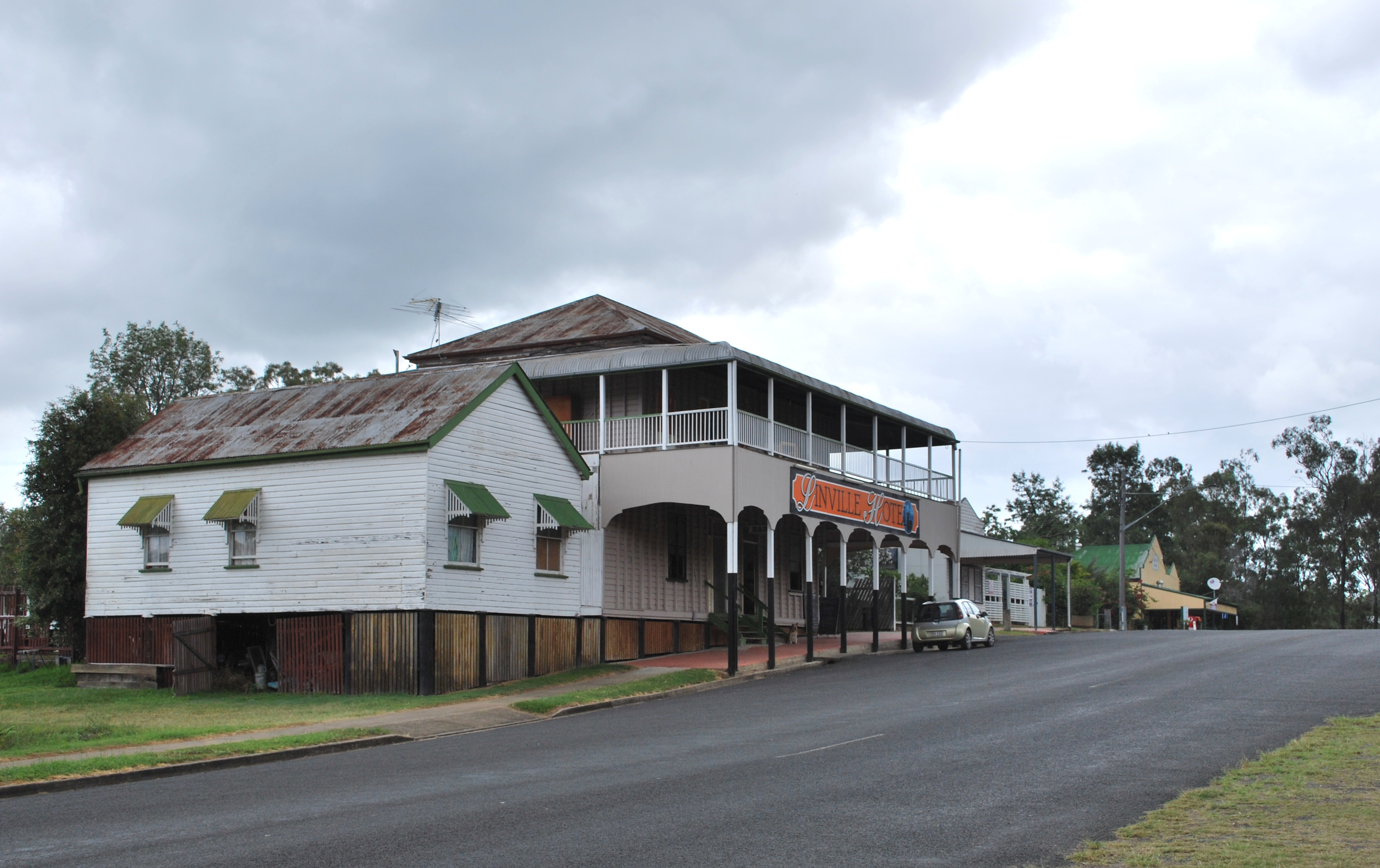
Linville Hotel & General Store

The town has a general store, the Linville Hotel, and the memorial hall.

There is a free camping area, playground, bbq's and toilets.

== Attractions ==
The old railway station and carriages are in the centre of the town.

The 161 km (100 mi) Brisbane Valley Rail Trail passes through the town of Linville; it is Australia's longest rail trail for hiking, cycling and horse riding.

The Linville War Memorial is in George Street.
