= Kilcoy–Murgon Road =

Road in Queensland, Australia

Kilcoy–Murgon Road Queensland

General information
- Type: Rural road
- Length: 120 km (75 mi)

Major junctions
- South end: D'Aguilar Highway, Kilcoy, Queensland
- Burnett Highway Murgon–Barambah Road
- North end: Bunya Highway, Murgon, Queensland

Kilcoy–Murgon Road is a major inland rural road located in Queensland, Australia. It is a state-controlled district road (number 491) rated as a local road of regional significance (LRRS).

The road runs from the D'Aguilar Highway in Kilcoy to the Bunya Highway in Murgon, a distance of 120 kilometres (75 mi). In Barambah it runs concurrent with the Burnett Highway for a short distance. It intersects with Murgon–Barambah Road in Murgon. The road provides a vital link between Kilcoy and Murgon. It travels through large forests of pine plantations and the historic timber town of Jimna.

== Route description ==
The route starts off at Kilcoy and is a sealed two-laned road from Kilcoy to Jimna, there are some long windy sections that require some care. The road beyond Jimna is mostly unsealed but is maintained as a good gravel road, that is unfenced in some sections. Tourist attractions along or shortly off the road include Jimna and its surrounds, the heritage-listed Elgin Vale Sawmill and Jimna Fire Tower, plus Yabba Falls near Jimna and Bjelke-Petersen Dam in the north.

=== List of towns ===
From north to south

- Jimna
- Manumbar
- Goomeri

== History ==
In January 2013, Cyclone Oswald caused flood damage and many landslides along the road and a partial closure, which took some time to repair.

== See also ==
- List of road routes in Queensland
