= Yabba Falls =

Yabba Falls (Top Plunge)
- Location within Queensland
- Location: Jimna, Queensland, Australia
- Coordinates: 26°33′45″S 152°26′53″E
- Type: Plunge
- Total height: 152 m (499 ft)
- Number of drops: 2
- Longest drop: 140 m (460 ft)
- Total width: Dependant
- Watercourse: Yabba Creek

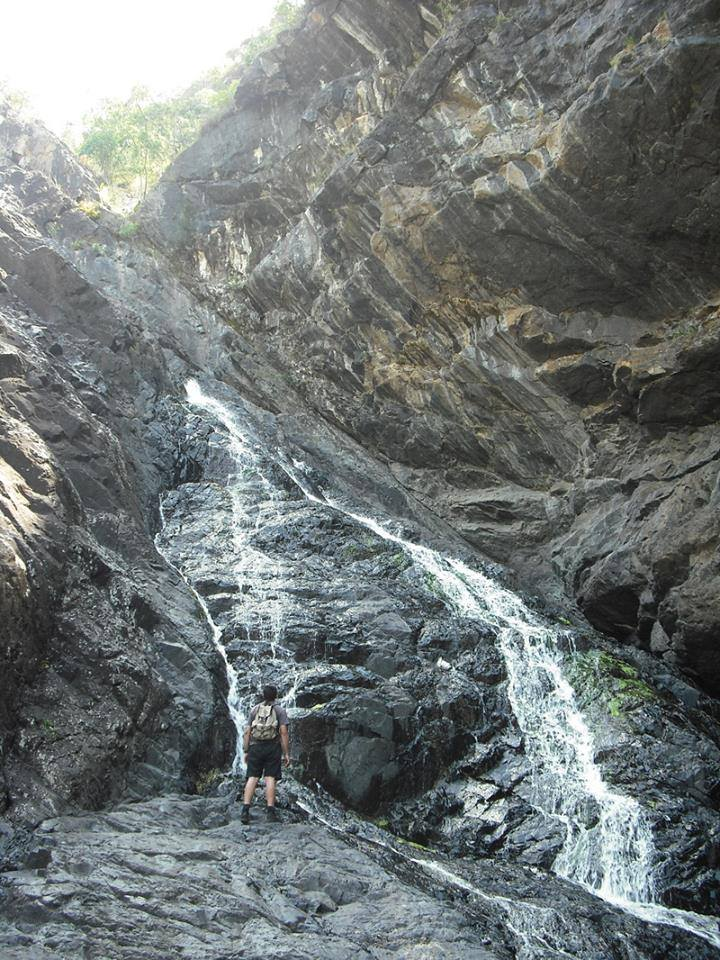
Yabba Falls, looking up at Stehbens Chute

Yabba Falls is a waterfall on Yabba Creek, a tributary of the Mary River, in Queensland, Australia. The waterfall is located within a 101 hectare reserve near Lake Borumba, in the Gympie Region, near the town of Jimna in the Conondale Range. Like other waterfalls in the area, Yabba Falls is surrounded by dense bush and pine plantations.

== Features ==
Yabba Falls is a set of 2 large drops and various cascades along the entire length of Baiyambora Gorge. The total descent from Swansons Washpool (410m amsl) to Corner Pools (250m amsl) is 160m. The features are as follows from top to bottom:

1. Swansons Washpool – Large, wide waterhole with a large portion located on the private property of Old Yabba Station. This pastoral station was the site of a Native Police barracks during the 1850s and 1860s.

2. Annette Cascades – Shallow, rocky cascades leading to the Top Plunge, mostly located in Public Land Reserve.

3. Top Plunge – Seventy-metre plunge into the middle gorge, top accessible via faint walking track, base access requires rock climbing and/or abseiling gear.

4. Kenny's Cataract – Very short, narrow gorge between Top Plunge and Stehbens Chute, access requires rock climbing and/or abseiling gear.

5. Stehbens Chute – 2nd major drop descending beneath overhanging cliffs, and orientated almost at right angles to the upper section of the falls. May be accessed from downstream by way of Fishermens Spur descent from Bella Creek Road and then hiking upstream into and through Gates of Yabba gorge. This gorge is 1 km south–north section of the valley in which large boulders and large rock pools are located. Gates of Yabba is hazardous in high flow periods. The left wall of Gates of Yabba is a Scenic Reserve, whilst the eastern side is a section of Wratten National Park.

6. Owen Cascades- Last section of the falls bears the streams of water over a convex profile into a series of pools, Corner Pools, at the right-angled corner on the gorge that leads into Gates of Yabba section of the gorge.

== See also ==
- List of waterfalls
- List of waterfalls in Australia
