= Sheep Station Creek, Queensland =

Sheep Station Creek
- Suburb
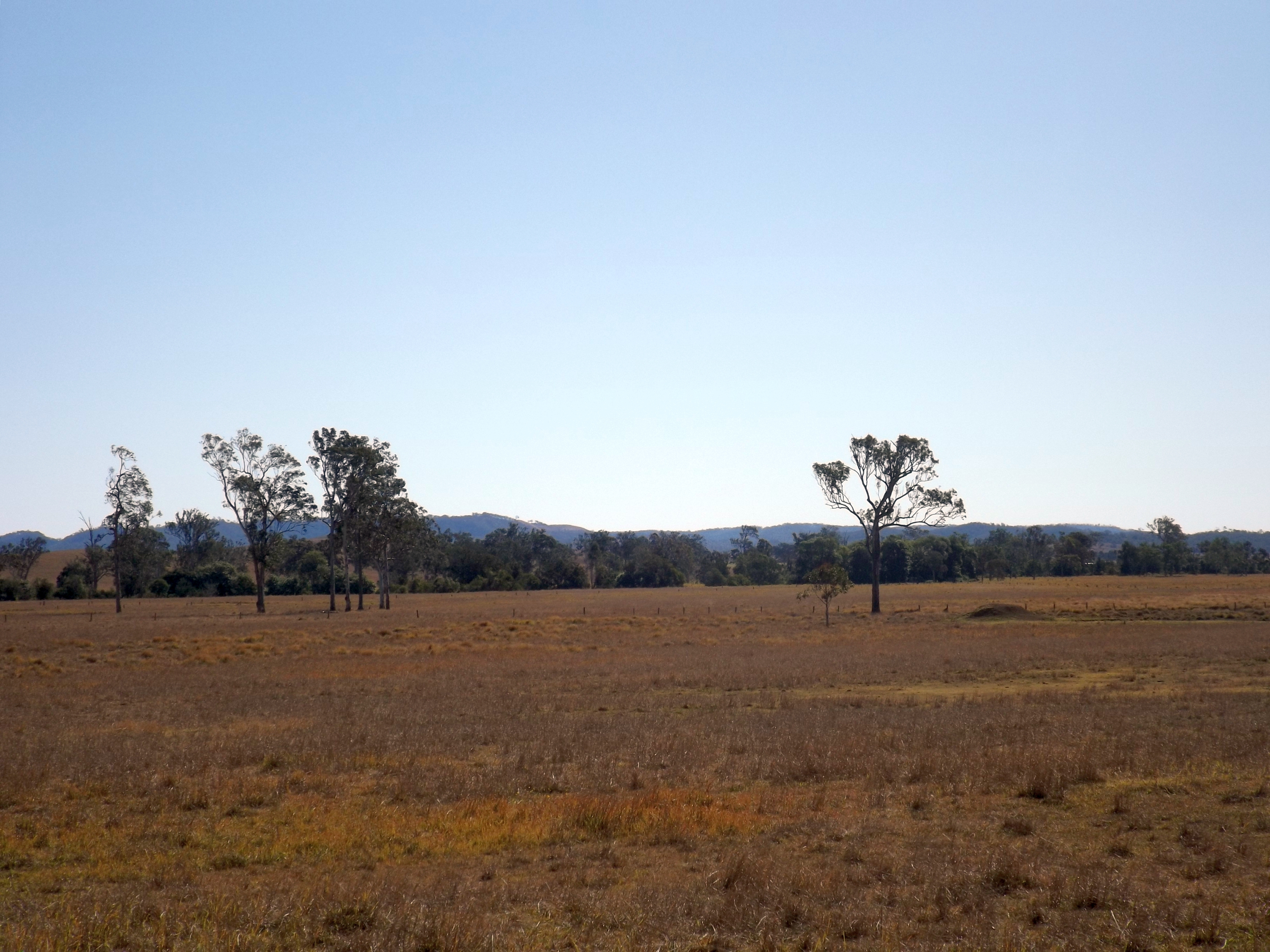
- Paddocks along Kilcoy Murgon Road, 2015

- Interactive map of Sheep Station Creek
- Coordinates: 26.8630°S 152.505°E
- Country: Australia
- State: Queensland
- LGA: Somerset Region
- Location: 14.3 km (8.9 mi) NNE of Kilcoy; 65.9 km (40.9 mi) NNE of Esk; 119 km (74 mi) WNW of Brisbane

Government
  - State electorate: Nanango
  - Federal division: Blair

Area
  - Total: 137.5 km^{2} (53.1 sq mi)

Population
  - Total: 116 (2021 census)
  - Density: 0.844/km^{2} (2.185/sq mi)
- Time zone: UTC+10:00 (AEST)
- Postcode: 4515
Suburbs around Sheep Station Creek
| Linville | Monsildale | Jimna |
| Moore; Harlin | Sheep Station Creek | Mount Kilcoy |
| Woolmar | Kilcoy | Winya |

Sheep Station Creek is a rural locality in the Somerset Region, Queensland, Australia. In the 2021 census, Sheep Station Creek had a population of 116 people.

== Geography ==
Northern parts rise in elevation along the south-western extent of the Conondale Range. The majority of Sheep Station Creek has been cleared of native vegetation and is now used for agriculture purposes.

== History ==
In December 1878, the Queensland Government established a temporary reserve of 21 acres 1 rood (8.6 ha) for a school. On 8 July 1882, a public meeting was held and resulted in an application being made to establish a provisional school with an expected enrolment of 14 students, noting that the nearest school was 15 miles (24 km) distant in Neurum. In 1884, the school opened under the name Kilcoy Provisional School. In 1894, it was renamed Sheep Station Creek Provisional School. On 1 January 1909, it became Sheep Station Creek State School. On 24 May 1919, the school's old decaying building was replaced by a school building relocated from Kandanga, which had outgrown its building. Sheep Station Creek State School closed in 1941. It was on Kilcoy Murgon Road (26.8738°S 152.5392°E).

In 1942 during World War II, the school was part of a site used for training by the Adelaide Rifles, a military unit of 760 men. The Sheep Station Creek 2/10th Battalion Memorial to the immediate west of the school (26.87364°S 152.53843°E) commemorates this unit from which 237 men were killed and 319 wounded in the Battle of Milne Bay and the Battle of Buna–Gona. The memorial was unveiled on Saturday 3 November 1951.

After the army abandoned the school site, the local community constructed a dance hall as an extension of the school building, using the school building as a supper room. In November 2018, the hall was damaged in a storm. In January 2019, the Somerset Regional Council decided that the building was not a valuable asset and not worth the cost of repairing and had the building quickly demolished. This upset the local community who believed they were not consulted about the future of the hall. The local community managed to obtain the materials from the demolished building and proposed to reconstruct the hall incorporating the recycled materials. As at February 2020, the council has invited the Sheep Station Creek Progress Association to submit a formal proposal.

== Demographics ==
In the 2011 census, the locality recorded a very low population, so it was included in the population statistics for a wider area which totalled 431 people.

In the 2016 census, Sheep Station Creek had a population of 108 people.

In the 2021 census, Sheep Station Creek had a population of 116 people.

== Education ==
There are no schools in Sheep Station Creek. The nearest government primary schools are Kilcoy State School in neighbouring Kilcoy to the south and Mount Kilcoy State School in neighbouring Mount Kilcoy to the east. The nearest government secondary school is Kilcoy State High School in Kilcoy.
