= Bella Creek, Queensland =

Bella Creek
- Suburb
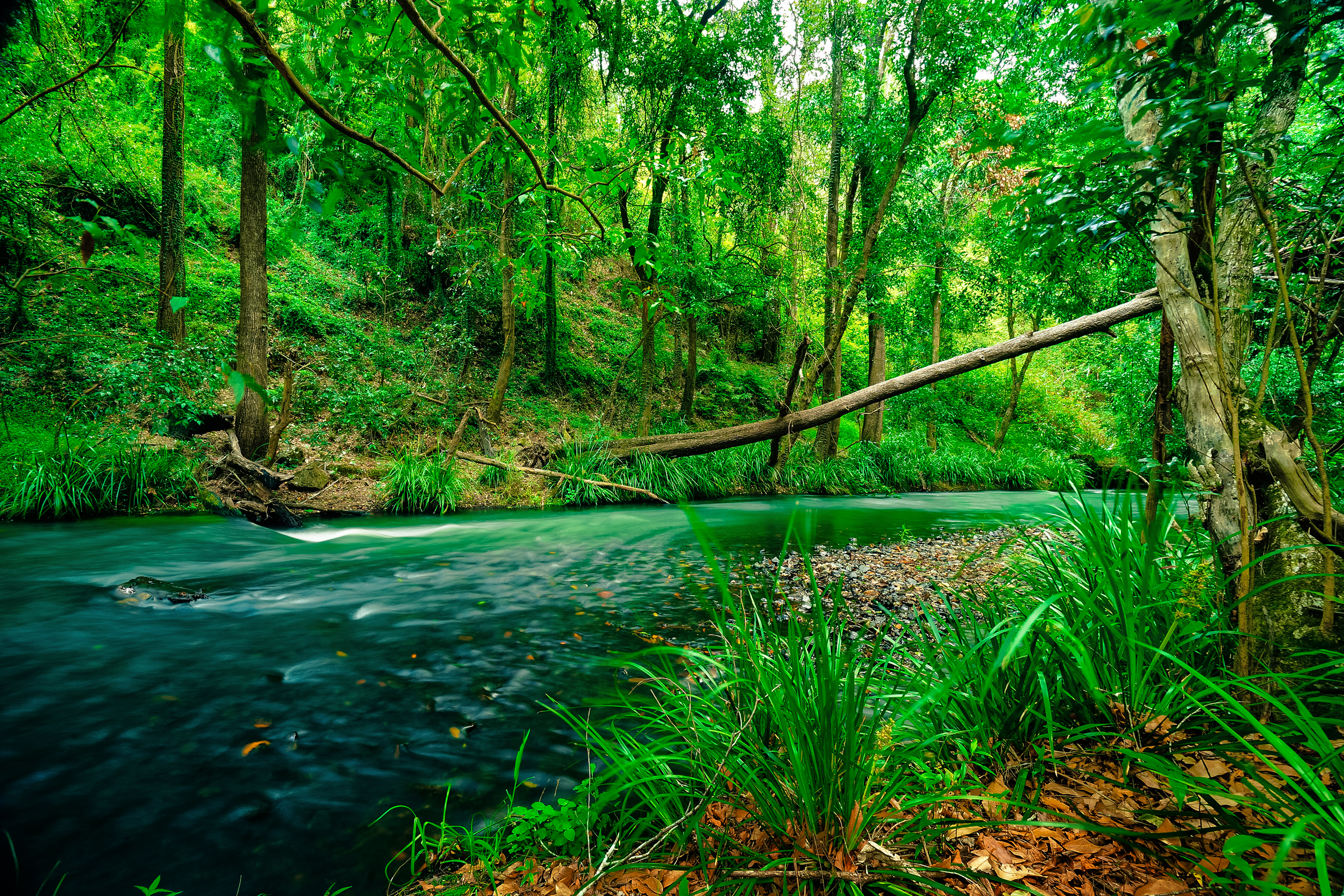
- Yabba Creek at Bella Creek, 2017

- Interactive map of Bella Creek
- Coordinates: 26.4777°S 152.5611°E
- Country: Australia
- State: Queensland
- LGA: Gympie Region
- Location: 14.8 km (9.2 mi) W of Imbil; 50.5 km (31.4 mi) SSW of Gympie; 174 km (108 mi) NNW of Brisbane

Government
  - State electorate: Gympie
  - Federal division: Wide Bay

Area
  - Total: 27.8 km^{2} (10.7 sq mi)

Population
  - Total: 50 (2021 census)
  - Density: 1.80/km^{2} (4.7/sq mi)
- Time zone: UTC+10:00 (AEST)
- Postcode: 4570
Suburbs around Bella Creek
Upper Kandanga	Upper Kandanga	Imbil
Lake Borumba	Bella Creek	Imbil
Lake Borumba	Lake Borumba	Lake Borumba

Bella Creek is a rural locality in the Gympie Region, Queensland, Australia. In the 2021 census, Bella Creek had a population of 50 people.

== Geography ==
The watercourse Bella Creek rises to the west of the locality in Lake Borumba and flows east into the locality of Bella Creek where it takes a meandering but generally eastward route through the locality. It becomes a tributary of Yabba Creek near the south-eastern boundary of the suburb.

Bella Creek Road enters the locality from the south-east (Lake Borumba) and proceeds west through the locality. It loosely follows the course of the creek on its southern side. The road exits to the south-west (Lake Borumba). Little Bella Creek Road branches off from Bella Creek Road and proceeds north crossing the creek, terminating before the locality's northern boundary.

The land use is predominantly grazing on native vegetation, but there are some rural residential lots along Litle Bella Creek Road.

== History ==
Bella Junction Provisional School opened on 28 May 1928 with 13 students. It was built with timber donated by local people and built by local farmer Frank Edward Schellbach. Declining enrolments forced the school to close on 11 July 1932. The school was located at the junction of the Bella Creek and Yabba Creek beside the state forest reserve (at approx 26.4912°S 152.5879°E).

== Demographics ==
In the 2016 census, Bella Creek had a population of 43 people.

In the 2021 census, Bella Creek had a population of 50 people.

== Education ==
There are no schools in Bella Creek. The nearest government primary school is Mary Valley State College in neighbouring Imbil to the north-east. The nearest government secondary schools are Mary Valley State College (to Year 10) and Gympie State High School (to Year 12) in Gympie to the north.
