= Avoca Vale =

- Suburb
- Interactive map of Avoca Vale
- Coordinates: 26.7316°S 152.2427°E
- Country: Australia
- State: Queensland
- LGA: Somerset Region
- Location: 48.1 km (29.9 mi) E of Nanango; 49.9 km (31.0 mi) N of Toogoolawah; 67.4 km (41.9 mi) N of Esk; 131 km (81 mi) NNW of Ipswich; 168 km (104 mi) NW of Brisbane

Government
  - State electorate: Nanango
  - Federal division: Blair

Area
  - Total: 205.1 km^{2} (79.2 sq mi)

Population
  - Total: 20 (2021 census)
  - Density: 0.098/km^{2} (0.25/sq mi)
- Time zone: UTC+10:00 (AEST)
- Postcode: 4314
Suburbs around Avoca Vale
Mount Stanley	Mount Stanley	Kingaham
Mount Stanley	Avoca Vale	Monsildale
East Nanango; Teelah	Taromeo; Linville	Monsildale

Avoca Vale is a rural locality in the Somerset Region, Queensland, Australia. In the 2021 census, Avoca Vale had a population of 20 people.

== Geography ==
The Brisbane River passes through the south of the locality, entering from the west (Mount Stanley) and exit to the south-east (Linville / Monsildale). Avoca Creek rises in the north of the locality and flows, becoming a tributary of the Brisbane River in the south of the locality (26.75°S 152.25°E).

The main road route through the locality is Mount Stanley Road which enters from the south (Linville) and loosely follows the Brisbane River (crossing it a number of times) and then is renamed Linville Road, before exiting to the west (Mount Stanley).

Squirrel Creek National Park is in the east of the locality, extending into neighbouring Monsildale. Diaper State Forest is in the north of the locality, extending into neighbouring Kingham. Apart from these protected areas, the land use is predominantly grazing on native vegetation.

== History ==
The locality was officially named and bounded on 9 July 1999.

On 1 February 2018, Avoca Vale's postcode changed from 4306 to 4314.

Squirrel Creek National Park was officially gazetted in 2024 to protect endangered riverine wetlands and vulnerable species including the plumed frogmouth and black-breasted buttonquail.

== Demographics ==
In the 2016 census, Avoca Vale had a population of 34 people.

In the 2021 census, Avoca Vale had a population of 20 people.

== Education ==
There are no schools in Avoca Vale. The nearest government primary schools are Linville State School in neighbouring Linville to the south and Nanango State School in Nanango to the west. The nearest government secondary schools are Mary Valley State College (to Year 10) in Imbil to the north-east, Toogoolawah State High School (to Year 12) in Toogoolawah to the south, and Nanango State High School (to Year 12) in Nanango to the west. However, some students in the locality would be too distant to attend any of these secondary schools; the alternatives are distance education and boarding school.

There is also a Catholic primary school in Nanango.
