= Kingaham, Queensland =

Kingaham
- Suburb
- Interactive map of Kingaham
- Coordinates: 26.5508°S 152.3755°E
- Country: Australia
- State: Queensland
- LGA: Somerset Region
- Location: 57.3 km (35.6 mi) NNW of Kilcoy; 109 km (68 mi) N of Esk; 165 km (103 mi) NNW of Brisbane

Government
  - State electorate: Nanango
  - Federal division: Blair

Area
  - Total: 206.5 km^{2} (79.7 sq mi)

Population
  - Total: 21 (2021 census)
  - Density: 0.1017/km^{2} (0.263/sq mi)
- Time zone: UTC+10:00 (AEST)
- Postcode: 4515
Suburbs around Kingaham
Manumbar	Upper Kandanga	Upper Kandanga
Mount Stanley	Kingaham	Lake Borumba
Avoca Vale	Monsildale	Jimna

Kingaham is a rural locality in the Somerset Region, Queensland, Australia. In the 2021 census, Kingaham had a population of 21 people.

== Geography ==
Over half of the land in Kingaham is state forest, including Yabba State Forest in the north, Jimna State Forest in the south, and Diaper State Forest in the south-west. Wrattens National Park is in the south of the locality.

The remaining land is freehold, predominantly used for grazing on native vegetation.

== History ==
In 1887, 42,880 acres (17,350 ha) of land were resumed from the Yabba pastoral run for the establishment of small farms. The land was offered for selection on 17 April 1887.

== Demographics ==
In the 2016 census, Kingaham had a population of 14 people.

In the 2021 census, Kingaham had a population of 21 people.

== Education ==
There are no schools in Kingaham. The nearest government primary schools are Mary Valley State College in Imbil to the east and Kilcoy State School in Kilcoy to the south-east. The nearest government secondary schools are Mary Valley State College (to Year 10) and Kilcoy State High School in Kilcoy (to Year 12). Some parts of Kingaham may be too distant to attend Kilcoy State High School; the alternatives are distance education and boarding school.
