= Jimna, Queensland =

Jimna
- Town
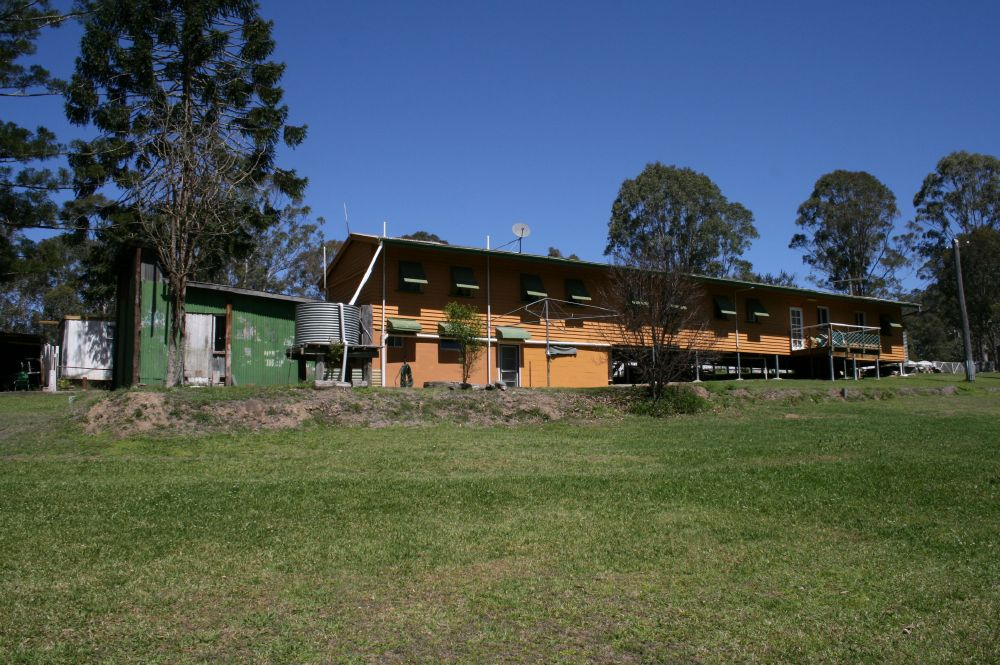
- Jimna Single Men's Barracks (former), 2007

- Interactive map of Jimna
- Coordinates: 26.6609°S 152.4649°E
- Country: Australia
- State: Queensland
- LGA: Somerset Region
- Location: 39.3 km (24.4 mi) N of Kilcoy; 90.9 km (56.5 mi) N of Esk; 138 km (86 mi) N of Ipswich; 143 km (89 mi) NW of Brisbane

Government
  - State electorate: Nanango
  - Federal division: Blair

Area
  - Total: 315.8 km^{2} (121.9 sq mi)

Population
  - Total: 70 (2021 census)
  - Density: 0.222/km^{2} (0.57/sq mi)
- Time zone: UTC+10:00 (AEST)
- Postcode: 4515
Localities around Jimna
Kingaham	Lake Borumba	Lake Borumba
Monsildale	Jimna	Kenilworth
Sheep Station Creek	Mount Kilcoy; Sandy Creek	Conondale

Jimna is a rural town and locality in the Somerset Region, Queensland, Australia. In the 2021 census, the locality of Jimna had a population of 70 people.

== Geography ==
Jimna is situated on the Jimna Range approximately 1690 feet (515.11 metres) above sea level.

Jimna Diggings is a neighbourhood in the east of the locality, an area historically used for gold mining (26.7078°S 152.5350°E).

=== Mountains ===
Jimna has the following mountains (from north to south):

- Summer Mountain (26.6645°S 152.5650°E), rising to 790 metres (2,590 ft) above sea level
- Mount Rollman (26.6981°S 152.5491°E) 733 metres (2,405 ft)
- Mount Cabinet (26.7128°S 152.5670°E) 816 metres (2,677 ft)
- Mount Constance (26.7276°S 152.5613°E) 777 metres (2,549 ft)
- Mount Langley (26.7337°S 152.5852°E) 868 metres (2,848 ft)
- Mount Denmark (26.7344°S 152.5476°E) 735 metres (2,411 ft)
- Jinker Hill (26.7367°S 152.4658°E) 545 metres (1,788 ft)
- Mount Adelaide (26.7370°S 152.5531°E) 752 metres (2,467 ft)
- Mount Lofty (26.7449°S 152.5573°E) 763 metres (2,503 ft)
- Grey Bluff (26.7505°S 152.4729°E) 450 metres (1,480 ft)
- Little Bluff (26.7518°S 152.4783°E) 450 metres (1,480 ft)
- Red Bluff (26.7588°S 152.4801°E) 465 metres (1,526 ft)

== History ==
Duungidjawu (also known as Wakka Wakka) is an Australian Aboriginal language spoken on Duungidjawu country. The Duungidjawu language region includes the landscape within the local government boundaries of Somerset Region, particularly the towns of Kilcoy and Moore.

The name Jimna is believed to be an Aboriginal word djimna meaning place of leeches.

The first Jimna Post Office opened on 1 July 1868 and closed in 1879. A receiving office was open from 1891 to 1909, and from 1925 until the second Jimna Post Office opened on 1 July 1927. This closed in 1981.

In 1887, 42,880 acres (17,350 ha) of land were resumed from the Yabba pastoral run for the establishment of small farms. The land was offered for selection on 17 April 1887.

Monsildale Provisional School opened on 2 June 1913. In 1923, the school was moved and renamed Foxlowe Provisional School. On 25 June 1926 it was renamed Jimna Provisional School. On 1 October 1934, it became Jimna State School. It was mothballed on 31 December 2006 and closed on 31 December 2009. (In about 1941, a separate Monsildale State School was opened but closed about 1961.) It was at 21 School Road (26.6619°S 152.4623°E). The Jimna school site was developed as a camping ground retaining the school buildings and other facilities. The school's website was archived.

Commercial loggers Hancock and Gore moved their sawmill from Monsildale to what would become Jimna in 1922. The sawmill was burnt down in 1947.

The state government established a hoop pine nursery at Jimna in 1935. Jimna hall was opened in 1934. When sawmilling contracted in the mid 1970s, the town's population reduced significantly.

== Demographics ==
In the 2016 census, the locality of Jimna had a population of 91 people.

In the 2021 census, the locality of Jimna had a population of 70 people.

== Heritage listings ==
Jimna has a number of heritage-listed sites, including:

- Jimna Fire Tower, Kilcoy-Murgon Road
- former Jimna Single Men's Barracks, 4 Tip Road

== Education ==
There are no schools in Jimna. The nearest government primary schools are Kenilworth State Community College in Kenilworth to the east, Woodford State School in Woodford to the south-east, Mount Kilcoy State School in neighbouring Mount Kilcoy to the south, and Kilcoy State School in Kilcoy to the south. The nearest government secondary schools are Kilcoy State High School (to Year 12) in Kilcoy to the south, Woodford State School (to Year 10) in Woodford to the south-east, and Mary Valley State College (to Year 10) in Imbil to the north-east.

== Amentities ==
Jimna Cricket Oval also serves as a camping ground and heliport (26.6627°S 152.4620°E). It is adjacent to the Jimna Hall and the Jimna Sporting Club.

== Attractions ==
Jimna has a number of tourist attractions:

- Eugenia Track Viewing Platform, off Peach Trees Road (26.6380°S 152.4584°E)
- Yednia Lookout (26.7604°S 152.4794°E)
- Yeilo Lookout (26.7592°S 152.4799°E)
