= Lake Borumba, Queensland =

Lake Borumba
- Suburb
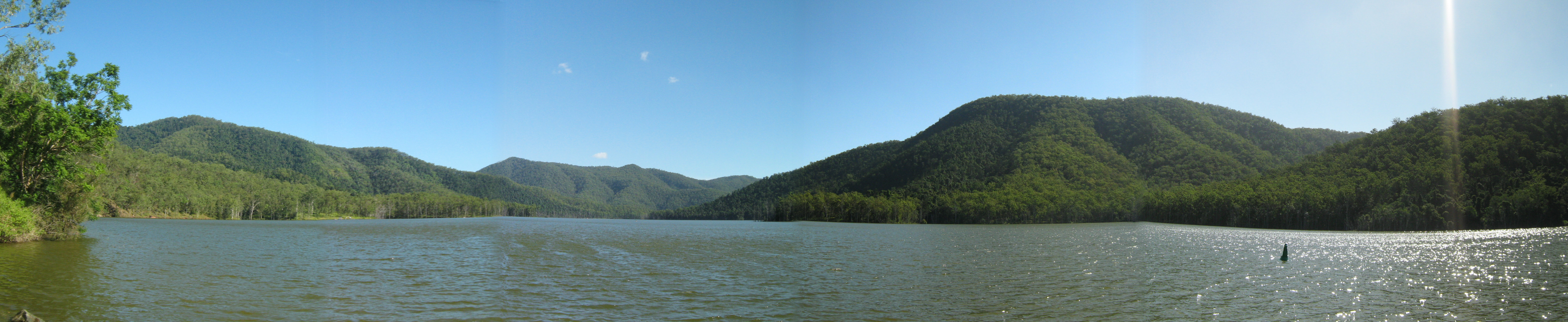
- Lake Borumba panorama, 2009

- Interactive map of Lake Borumba
- Coordinates: 26.5277°S 152.5500°E
- Country: Australia
- State: Queensland
- LGA: Gympie Region
- Location: 55.8 km (34.7 mi) SW of Gympie; 182 km (113 mi) NNW of Brisbane

Government
  - State electorate: Gympie
  - Federal division: Wide Bay

Area
  - Total: 163.2 km^{2} (63.0 sq mi)

Population
  - Total: 12 (2021 census)
  - Density: 0.0735/km^{2} (0.190/sq mi)
- Time zone: UTC+10:00 (AEST)
- Postcode: 4570
Suburbs around Lake Borumba
Upper Kandanga	Bella Creek	Bella Creek
Kingaham	Lake Borumba	Imbil
Jimna	Jimna	Kenilworth

Lake Borumba is a rural locality in the Gympie Region, Queensland, Australia. In the 2021 census, Lake Borumba had a population of 12 people.

== Geography ==
The reservoir Lake Borumba (26.5158°S 152.5764°E) was created by building the Borumba Dam (26.5069°S 152.5818°E) across Yabba Creek.

Large areas to the north and south of the lake are within the Conondale National Park which extends south-east into neighbouring Kenilworth.

== History ==
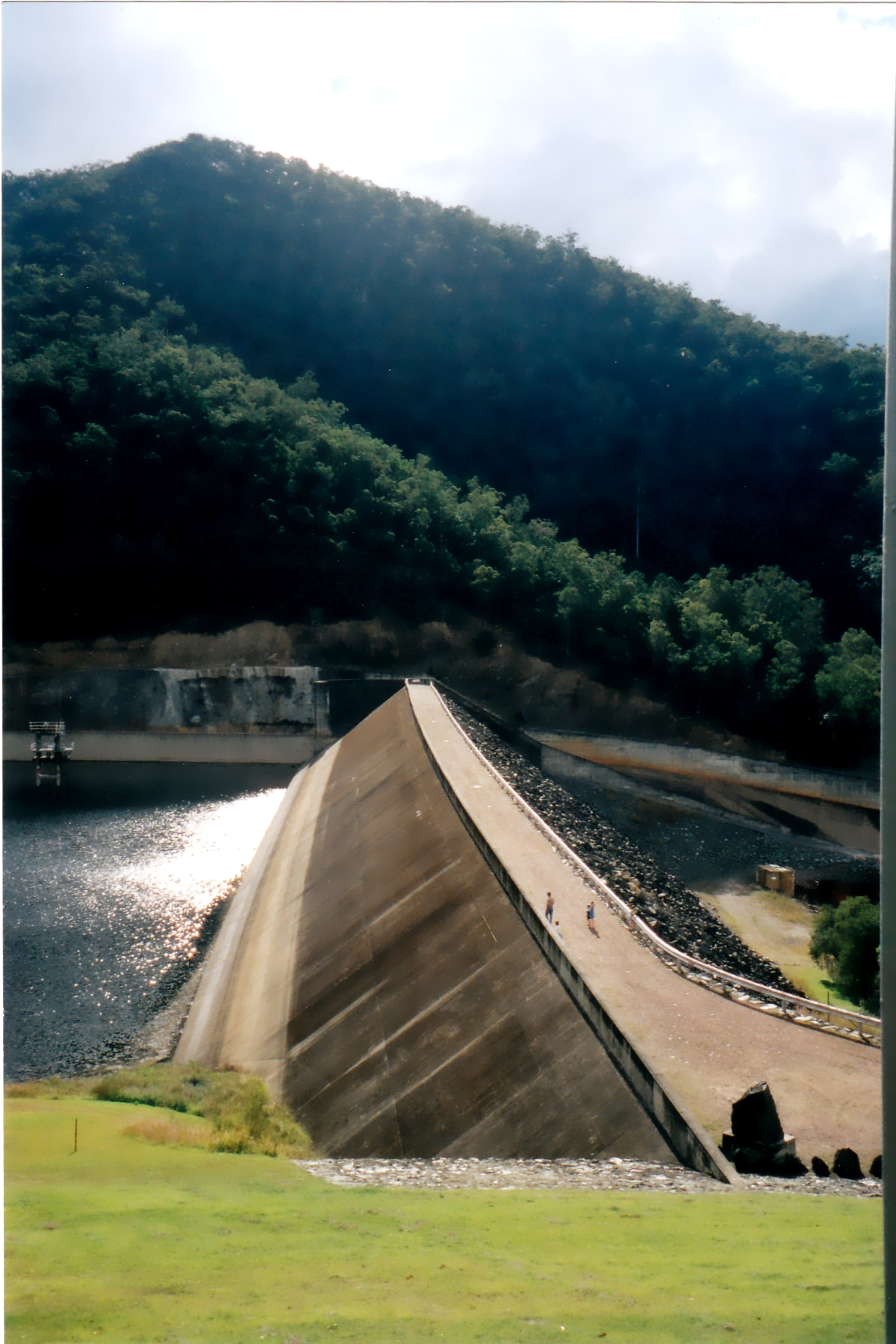
Borumba dam wall

The Borumba Dam was designed and built by the Queensland Government's Irrigation and Water Supply Commission. The Snowy Mountains Hydro Electric Authority provided advice on the hydro-electricity and spillway design. The first part of the work was the construction of a village for the workers.

Borumba Dam Provisional School opened on 23 January 1961. It was established to provide schooling to the children of the dam workers who lived at the construction site. There were two teachers at the school. Average attendance numbers in 1961 were 35 students. At the start of 1962, it became Borumba Dam State School with an average attendance of 54 students rising to an average of 61 students in 1963. The dam was completed in March 1964 and the workers and their children moved away with average attendance of 17 children in early 1964. The school closed on 29 May 1964. It was on the eastern side of Yabba Creek north of the dam wall (approx 26.50188°S 152.58773°E).

== Demographics ==
In the 2016 census, Lake Borumba had a population of 6 people.

In the 2021 census, Lake Borumba had a population of 12 people.

== Education ==
There are no schools in Lake Borumba. The nearest government primary schools are Mary Valley State College in neighbouring Imbil to the east and Kenilworth State Community College in neighbouring Kenilworth to the south-east. The nearest government secondary schools are Mary Valley State College (to Year 10) in Imbil, Kilcoy State High School (to Year 12) in Kilcoy to the south and Gympie State High School (to Year 12) in Gympie to the north-east.

== Amenities ==
There is a boat ramp into the Borumba Dam (26.5097°S 152.5814°E). It is accessed via Yabba Creek Road in neighbouring Imbil. It is managed by the South East Queensland Water Corporation.

At the lake, there are facilities for picnics and camping. Boating is permitted, both motorised and non-motorised. Water sports such as jetskiing, waterskiing, wakeboarding and tube riding are allowed. The dams are stocked with fish suitable for lure and fish fishing, but a permit must be obtained.
