= Monsildale, Queensland =

Monsildale
- Suburb
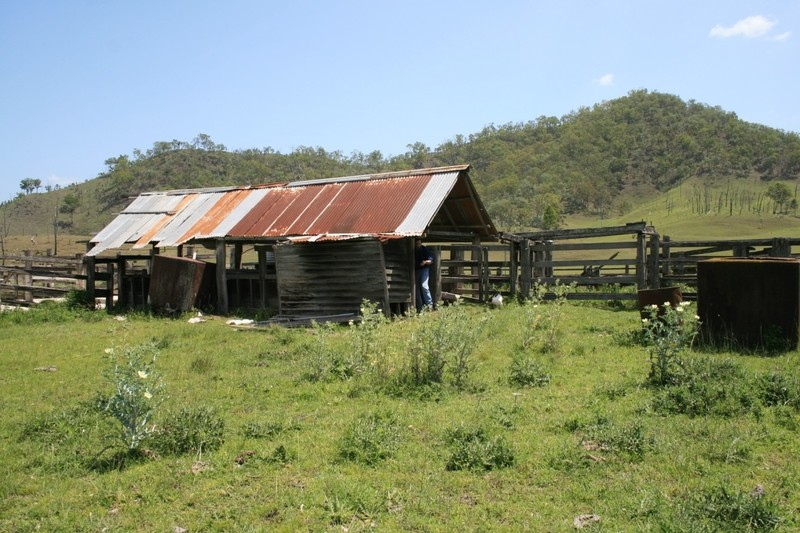
- Outbuilding, Monsildale Homestead, 2007

- Interactive map of Monsildale
- Coordinates: 26.7733°S 152.3094°E
- Country: Australia
- State: Queensland
- LGA: Somerset Region
- Location: 33.1 km (20.6 mi) NNW of Kilcoy; 67.3 km (41.8 mi) N of Toogoolawah; 84.7 km (52.6 mi) N of Esk; 137 km (85 mi) NNW of Brisbane

Government
  - State electorate: Nanango
  - Federal division: Blair

Area
  - Total: 329.2 km^{2} (127.1 sq mi)

Population
  - Total: 18 (2021 census)
  - Density: 0.0547/km^{2} (0.142/sq mi)
- Time zone: UTC+10:00 (AEST)
- Postcode: 4515
Suburbs around Monsildale
Kingaham	Kingaham	Kingaham
Avoca Vale	Monsildale	Jimna
Avoca Vale	Linville	Sheep Station Creek

Monsildale is a rural locality in the Somerset Region, Queensland, Australia. In the 2021 census, Monsildale had a population of 18 people.

== Geography ==
The Kilcoy Murgon Road forms the eastern boundary of the locality.

Monsildale Creek rises in the north-west of the locality and meanders towards the south-western boundary of the locality where it becomes a tributary of the Brisbane River (26.78525°S 152.26928°E), which forms a small section of the south-western boundary before exiting south to neighbouring Linville.

There are a number of protected areas in the locality:

- Squirrel Creek National Park, in the west of the locality, extending into neighbouring Avoca Vale
- Squirrel Creek State Forest, in the west of the locality
- Wrattens National Park, in the north of the locality
- Jimna State Forest, in the north-east of the locality, extending into neighbouring Kingaham and Jimna
- Sunday Creek State Forest, in the east of the locality, extending into neighbouring Jimna
- Conondale National Park, in the south-east of the locality, extending into neighbouring Jimna

Monsildale has the following mountains:

- Mount Monsildale in the west of the locality (26.6874°S 152.3454°E) 726 metres (2,382 ft)
- Mount Pascoe in the south-west of the locality (26.7672°S 152.3000°E) 395 metres (1,296 ft)

Apart from the protected areas, the land use is grazing on native vegetation.

== History ==
The name Monsildale comes from the name of pastoral run used by David Cannon McConnel (1818–1885), which was named after the Derbyshire valley which contained Cressbrook, his home town.

Monsildale Provisional School opened on 2 June 1913. In 1923, the school was relocated and renamed Foxlowe Provisional School. Then on 25 June 1926, it was renamed Jimna Provisional School and on 1 October 1934 became Jimna State School. It was mothballed in 2006 and officially closed on 31 December 2009.

Louisavale Provisional School opened on 11 November 1915. It closed on closed on 1 February 1934 due to low student numbers, but reopened on 25 July 1934. It closed permanently on 9 September 1940.

In about 1941, a separate Monsildale State School was opened but closed about 1961.

Squirrel Creek National Park was officially gazetted in 2024 to protect endangered riverine wetlands and vulnerable species including the plumed frogmouth and black-breasted buttonquail.

== Demographics ==
In the 2016 census, Monsildale had a population of 21 people.

In the 2021 census, Monsildale had a population of 18 people.

== Heritage listings ==
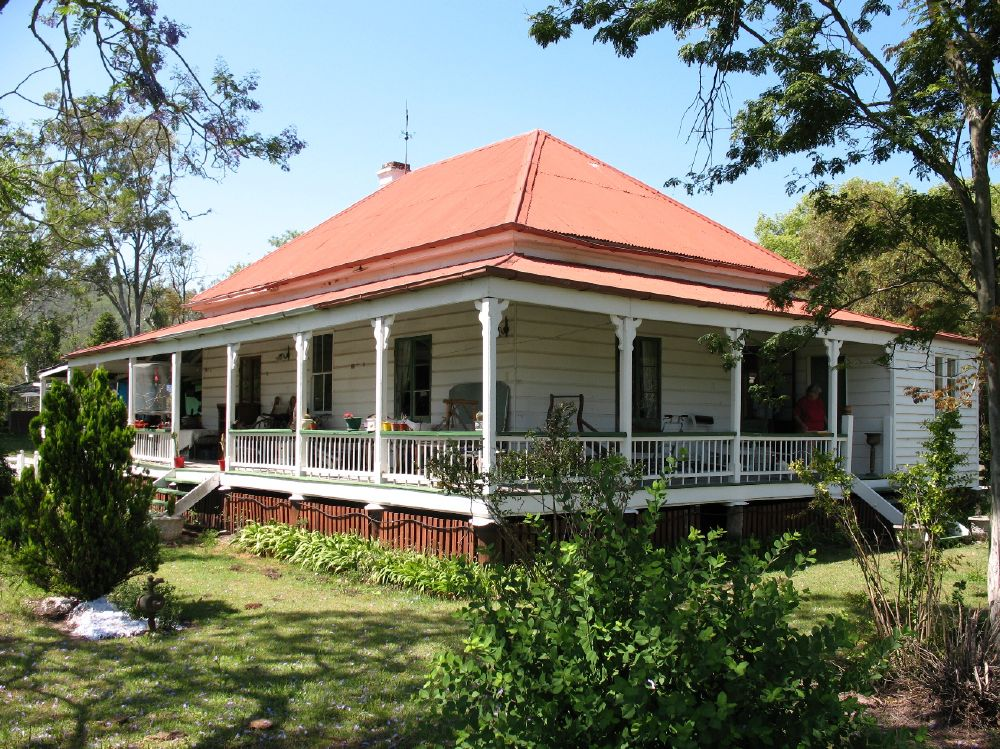
Monsildale Homestead, 2007

Monsildale has a number of heritage-listed sites, including:

- Monsildale Homestead, 2532 Monsildale Road (26.705216°S 152.397667°E)

== Education ==
There are no schools in Monsildale. The nearest government primary schools are Mary Valley State College in Imbil to the north-east, Kilcoy State School in Kilcoy to the south-east, and Linville State School in neighbouring Linville to the south. The nearest government secondary schools are Mary Valley State College (to Year 10) in Imbil, Kilcoy State High School (to Year 12) in Kilcoy, and Toogoolawah State High School (to Year 12) in Toogoolawah to the south. Some parts of Monsildale are too distant to attend any of these secondary schools with the alternatives being distance education and boarding school.
