= Jimna Fire Tower =

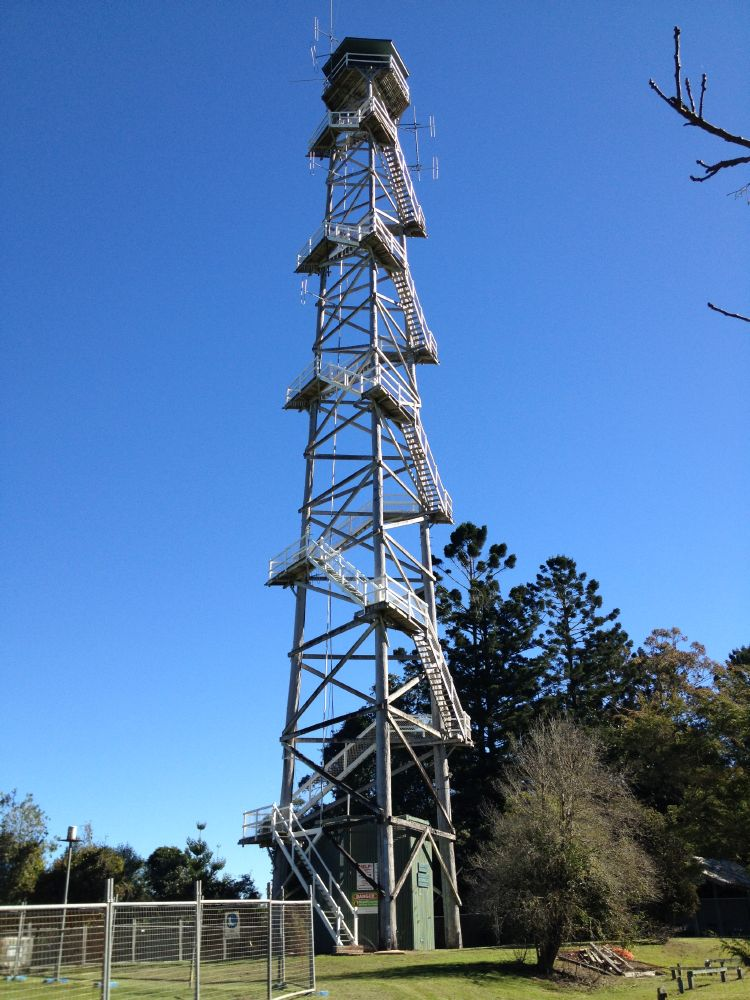
- Jimna Fire Tower, 2013

- Location within Queensland Location within Australia
- 26.6592°S 152.4522°E
- Location: Jimna State Forest, Murgon-Kilcoy Road, Jimna, Somerset Region, Queensland, Australia

History
- Built: c. 1975–1977

Site notes
- Architect: Arthur Leis

Queensland Heritage Register
- Official name: Jimna Fire Tower, SEQ-4C 8
- Type: state heritage (built)
- Designated: 23 July 1999
- Reference no.: 601814
- Significant period: 1970s (fabric)
- Builders: Arthur Leis

Jimna Fire Tower is a heritage-listed former fire lookout tower at Jimna State Forest, Murgon-Kilcoy Road, Jimna, Somerset Region, Queensland, Australia. It was designed by Arthur Leis and built from c. 1975 to 1977 by Arthur Leis. It is also known as SEQ-4C 8. It was added to the Queensland Heritage Register on 23 July 1999.

== History ==
Completed in 1977 by Arthur Leis, this timber fire tower is located one kilometre west of the township of Jimna, at the top of the Jimna Range. Supported by three ironbark poles or "legs", the Jimna fire tower is the tallest fire tower in Queensland with a tower height of 47 metres (154 ft) (pole length is 44 metres (144 ft)).

The township of Jimna (formerly Foxlowe) was established in 1922, following the relocation from Monsildale of the sawmill operated by the firm of Hancock and Gore. Hancock and Gore had commenced sawmilling operations at Monsildale in 1912. The entire township was moved, including sawmill, houses, shop, store and school.

Prior to 1935 a Forest Ranger looked after Forestry interests in the Jimna area. A nursery was subsequently established on the site of the present administration building and scrub clearing for the establishment of hoop pine plantations commenced in 1938, approximately 18 years after the commercial hoop pine plantations were established in Queensland, in the Mary Valley.

Consideration had been given to the need for effective fire protection as early as 1911, when discussed at an Interstate Conference on Forestry held in Sydney that year. Various methods of fire control appear to have been applied in subsequent years, including firelines and firebreaks of fire including in hoop pine forests, and in new plantations. Such outbreaks were serious as hoop pine is particularly vulnerable to fire.

In Queensland, construction of towers for fire detection commenced during the mid-1930s as part of a fire protection system which also included firebreaks. Fire towers continued to be erected as plantations were established through the 1940s and the 1950s.

The area of softwood plantations increased considerably during the 1960s and the 1970s. During this period there was also a program of construction of fire towers to serve new plantation areas and 16 towers were constructed. Nearly all these new towers were over 30 metres (98 ft) high, indicating the need to have towers taller than the surrounding plantations. By the mid-1960s some of the plantations would have been approximately 40 to 45 years old and in some areas had no doubt "outgrown" the original fire tower. Fire towers were also used in conjunction with each other to pinpoint fires by taking crossbearings between towers.

Arthur Leis commenced working for the Department of Forestry in 1957. Until his retirement in 1991, Leis was responsible for the erection of over 20 fire towers in Queensland. Leis designed the towers himself, cutting all the timber on site, and usually erecting each tower with the help of an off-sider and a block and tackle. Initially Leis' towers followed conventional design, supported by four timber legs. In 1967 Leis completed the first three-legged timber fire tower to be erected in Queensland, at Mount Binga in the Yarraman Forestry District. It is generally understood that Leis was responsible for the innovative new design. In 1968 the Department reported on "the wisdom of converting to this type of structure. Costs per foot at $66 was about 25 per cent down on the 4-legged design, formerly adopted, and the structure is very stable and firm". Leis constructed his last fire tower in 1986–87; a three-legged wooden tower at Mount Wolvi, south-east of Gympie. At the opening ceremony for the Mount Wolvi tower, the Hon. Bill Glasson, Minister for Lands, Forestry, Mapping and Surveying, presented Leis with a model of the new tower "in commemoration of the many wooden fire towers he [had] constructed over the past 30 years".

In 1975–76 construction commenced on a new fire tower at Jimna which "would be the tallest built to date", with a designed height of approximately 50 metres (160 ft). Replacing an earlier tower, the new Jimna fire tower was erected by Leis and his son. Two ironbark logs were spliced together to make each of the three legs. To erect the tower the first leg was winched into position and the remaining two legs were hauled upright, bracing and stairs were attached, and finally the cabin constructed on top. The new tower was intended to work "in conjunction with existing towers in the Jimna and Gallangowan areas, [to] improve the detection of wildfire's likely to affect the extensive Hoop Pine plantations and native forests in the district".

The Jimna fire tower was opened in October 1977 by the Hon. Ken Tomkins, Minister for Lands, Forestry, National Parks and Wildlife. A picnic area has been established surrounding the base of the fire tower.

The Jimna fire tower thresholded for National Estate social value at the Maryborough, Crows Nest and Nambour (non-Indigenous) community workshops conducted as part of the Comprehensive Regional Assessment for the South East Queensland biogeographic region Regional Forest Agreement.

The tower was popular with tourists, with claims of up to 30,000 per year. However, the deteriorating condition of the tower resulted in its closure to tourists in 2006 and it was proposed to delist it from the Queensland Heritage Register. Although funding was spent on restoring the tower, in 2014 it was still judged unsafe for public access. However (in 2015) it remains listed on the Queensland Heritage register.

== Description ==
The Jimna fire tower is located approximately one kilometre west of Jimna, on the southern side of the Kilcoy-Murgon Road. The Jimna fire tower is 47 metres (154 ft) high (pole length is 44 metres (144 ft)).

The tower comprises three ironbark poles in a triangular plan, which taper inwards from the base of the tower to the top of the tower. Each pole consists of two logs spliced together approximately halfway up the height of the tower, and is set into a concrete footing at the base of the tower. Poles are braced and cross-braced.

The poles support a hexagonal cabin at the top of the tower, accessed by a timber staircase which wraps around the outside of the tower. The staircase includes a series of small platforms.

A picnic area surrounding the base of the tower includes a car park. The toilet block has been decommissioned and the nearest public toilets are adjacent to the Jimna Hall, corner of Bellbird Road and School Road, Jimna.

== Heritage listing ==
Jimna Fire Tower was listed on the Queensland Heritage Register on 23 July 1999 having satisfied the following criteria.

The place is important in demonstrating the principal characteristics of a particular class of cultural places.

As the tallest tower in Queensland, and constructed using three poles, the Jimna fire tower is a fine example of a three-legged timber fire tower.

The place has a strong or special association with a particular community or cultural group for social, cultural or spiritual reasons.

Jimna fire tower is valued by the community as the tallest fire tower in Queensland, for the views available from the top of the fire tower, and for its construction by a father and son team.

The place has a special association with the life or work of a particular person, group or organisation of importance in Queensland's history.

Jimna fire tower is important for its association with Arthur Leis, who was influential in the design and construction of fire towers in Queensland from the 1960s to the late 1980s.
