= John Balfour (Queensland politician) =

Australian politician

The Hon John Balfour
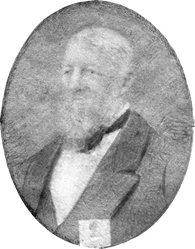

Member of the Queensland Legislative Council
- In office 1 May 1860 – 23 April 1864

Personal details
- Born: John Balfour; 1820 Edinburgh, Scotland
- Died: 1875 (aged 54–55) Edinburgh, Scotland
- Spouse: Jane Graham (m.1854)
- Relations: Robert Louis Stevenson (nephew)
- Occupation: Station owner

John Balfour (1820 – 21 March 1875) was a Station owner and Member of the Queensland Legislative Council.

== Early life ==
John Balfour was born in Edinburgh, Scotland in 1820 to Melville Balfour and his wife Joanna (née Brunton) and was the uncle of Robert Louis Stevenson. He arrived in Queensland around 1846 and, along with his brother, became Lessees of Colinton Station, Moreton. From 1849 till 1862 he was Lessee of Cumkillenbar Station, Darling Downs, and Columba Station, Leichhardt.

The locations of stations shown above refer to regions by which parts of the state were known at the time. They do not necessarily relate to current or former locality or local authority names.

== Politics ==
Balfour was appointed to the Queensland Legislative Council on 1 May 1860 and resigned his seat in 1864.

== Later life ==
Retiring to his home in Cleveland in 1865, he returned home to Scotland around 1872. Balfour died 21 March 1875.
