= Kerwalli =

Australian foreman and fishmonger

Sandy
- King of the Yagara (Yuggara)
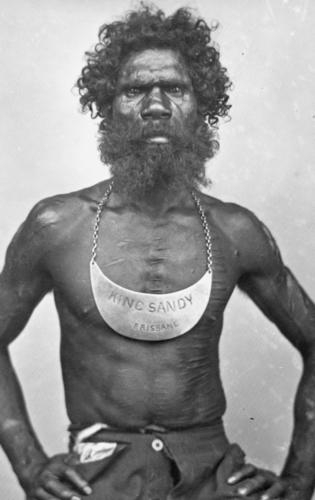
- Kerwalli, c. 1862–1869
- Reign: before 1853 – 1900
- Born: Gairballie c. 1832; Brisbane, Queensland
- Died: May 1900; Wynnum, Queensland
- Spouses: Sarah; Kitty Catchpenny
- Occupation: Foreman; Fishmonger

Kerwalli (nicknamed King Sandy; c. 1820 – May 1900) was an Aboriginal Australian foreman, fishmonger and headman of the Yagara people. He was a prominent member of Queensland's Aboriginal community in the 19th century.

He is not to be confused with King Sandy of the Brymedura tribe (died c. 1860) who assisted explorer Thomas Mitchell in 1835 and also wore a king plate.

== Family background ==
Kerwalli was born in Brisbane around 1820. His name meant "spilt". His wife was named Naewin also Sarah. Their daughter Dinaba also named Sarah married Dandruba Charlie Moreton of Stradbroke Island. Either he or Naewin was possibly related to Dalaipi, another Aboriginal headman from the Pine Rivers area of Queensland. He is the direct ancestor of the Moreton families of South East Queensland although many others claim Kerwalli as an ancestor.

== Career ==
From 1862 to 1880, Kerwalli worked for Thomas Petrie and William Pettigrew. He captained the first Aboriginal timber team in Queensland - a team of about 45 men, women and children. Kerwalli led his team around Mooloolaba and Buderim, eventually expanding to Noosa, the Blackall Ranges and Maroochy.

Kerwalli accompanied Petrie to the Mary River and Wide Bay regions. Around this time, he also travelled with a timber-hauling steamer, the Gneering, working as a fishmonger. After he ceased working as a foreman, he continued to sell fish and oysters in Brisbane City.

In 1875, Kerwalli famously opined that "white people had taken Brisbane from him" and given him a breastplate in exchange. In 1877, several Australian capitals produced medallions to commemorate the supplanting of Aboriginal headmen by the British colonies. One medallion was cast with Kerwalli's image and inscribed with "Sandy: Ex: Rex: Queensland".

In 1880 he assisted police during a search for a body in the Brisbane River.

On the request of Assistant Clerk Henry Wyatt Radford, Kerwalli would often advise the Queensland Parliament on local placenames. Radford and Kerwalli were responsible for officially retitling One Tree Hill to Mount Coot-tha in 1883. Politician Archibald Meston (Protector of Aborigines, 1898–1903) referenced Kerwalli as one of his main informants. However, Meston wrote in 1923 that "Gootcha" is a more accurate transcription, and that "Coot-tha" is a separate word translating to an obscenity; supposedly a joke played on Radford by Kerwalli.

Kerwalli was the subject of numerous photographs and drawings, most notably an 1899 portrait by Swedish-born painter Oscar Fristrom.

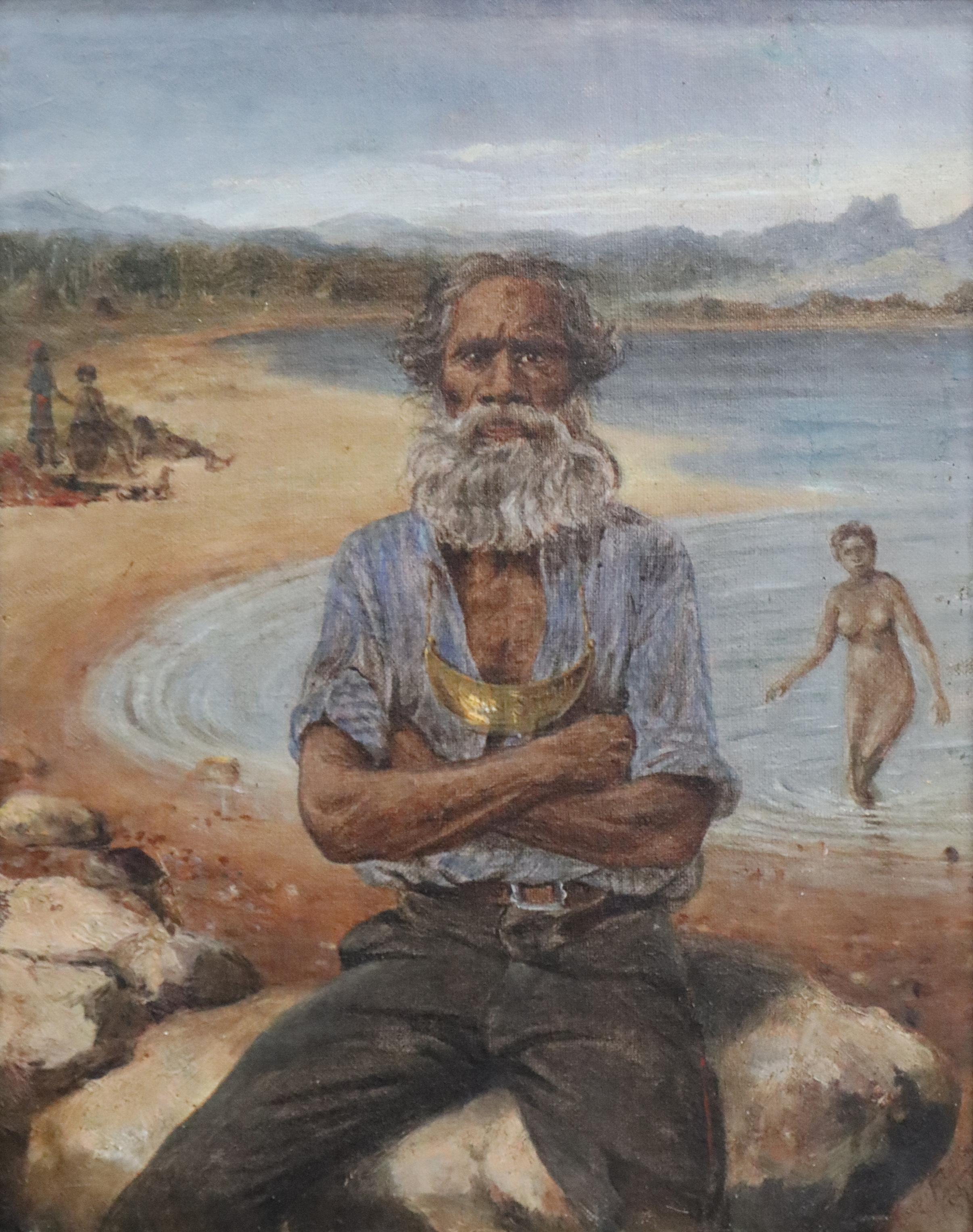
1899 portrait of Kerwalli by Oscar Fristrom

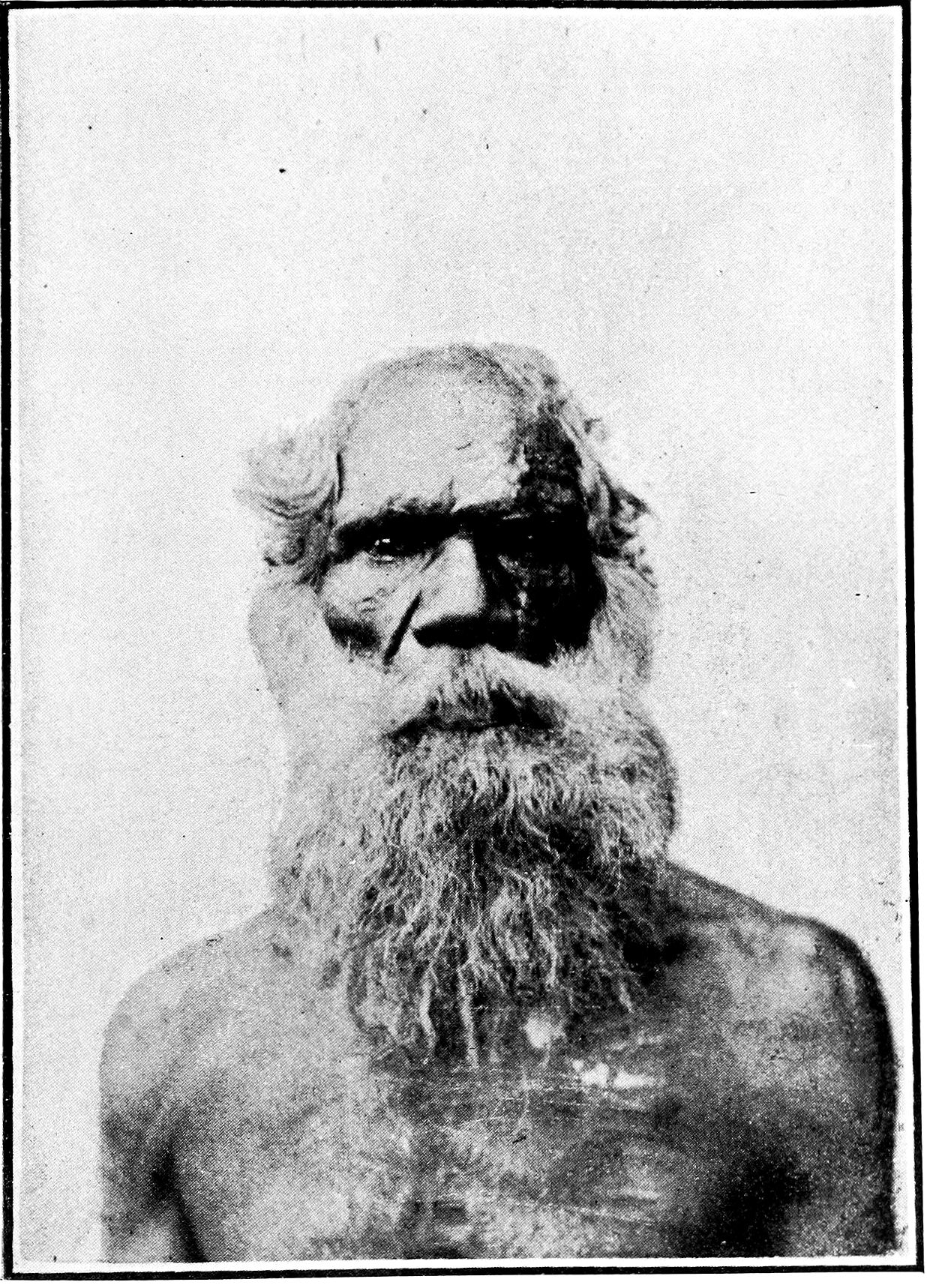
Photograph of Kerwalli ("King Sandy" in his old age

== Personal life ==
After the death of his first wife Sarah, he married well-known Aboriginal busker Kitty Catchpenny.

Later in life, Kerwalli resided in coastal areas such as Sandgate and the Moreton Bay Region (Toorbul and Redcliffe). Commonly seen selling fish in Brisbane, he became known as a popular and much-loved character.

For the last few years of his life, Kerwalli resided in Wynnum; he died there in May 1900.

== See also ==
- List of Indigenous Australian historical figures
