= Kudajarnd =

Aboriginal elder and performer (c.1845 - c.1905)

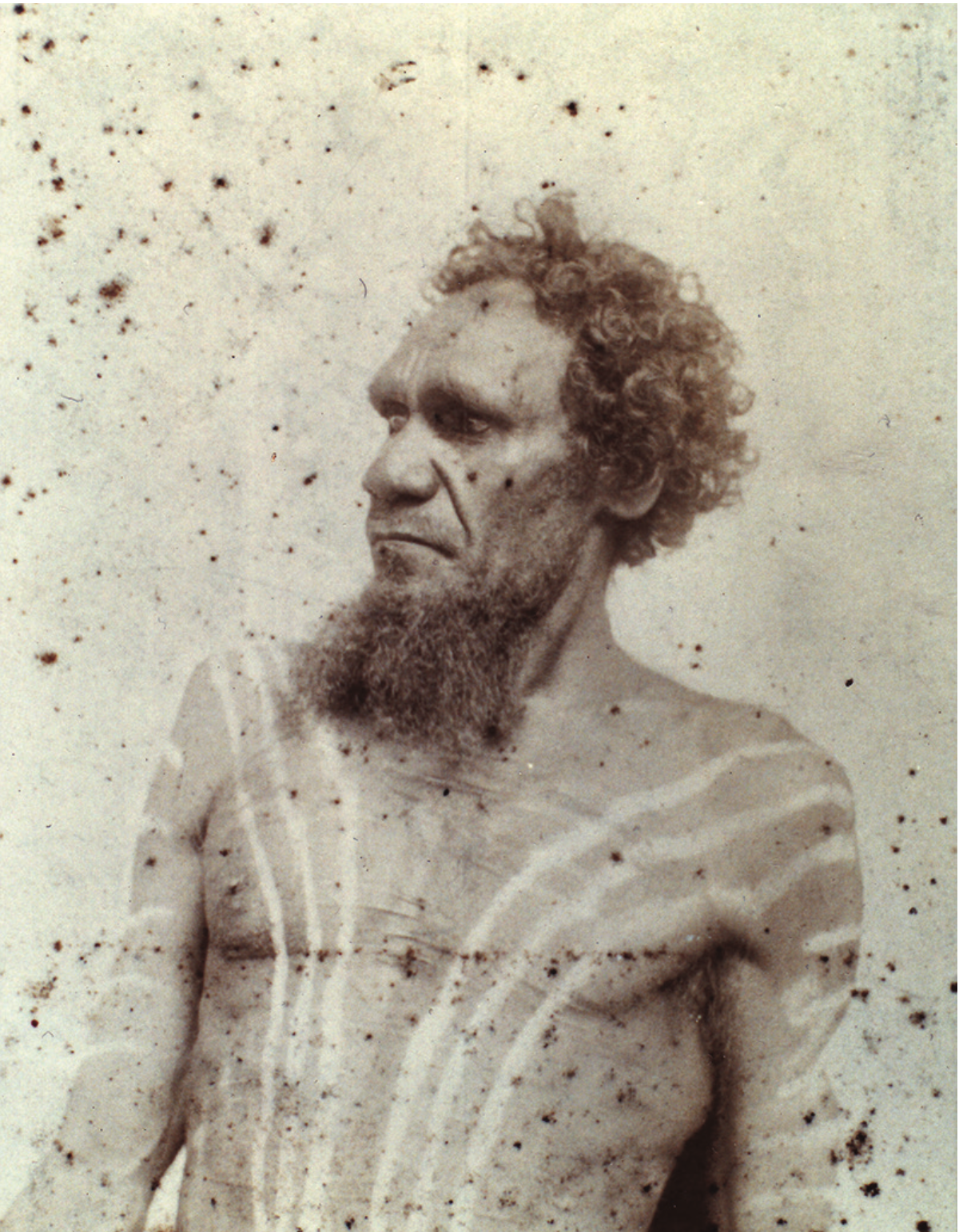
Portrait of Kudajarnd by Charles Kerry in 1893

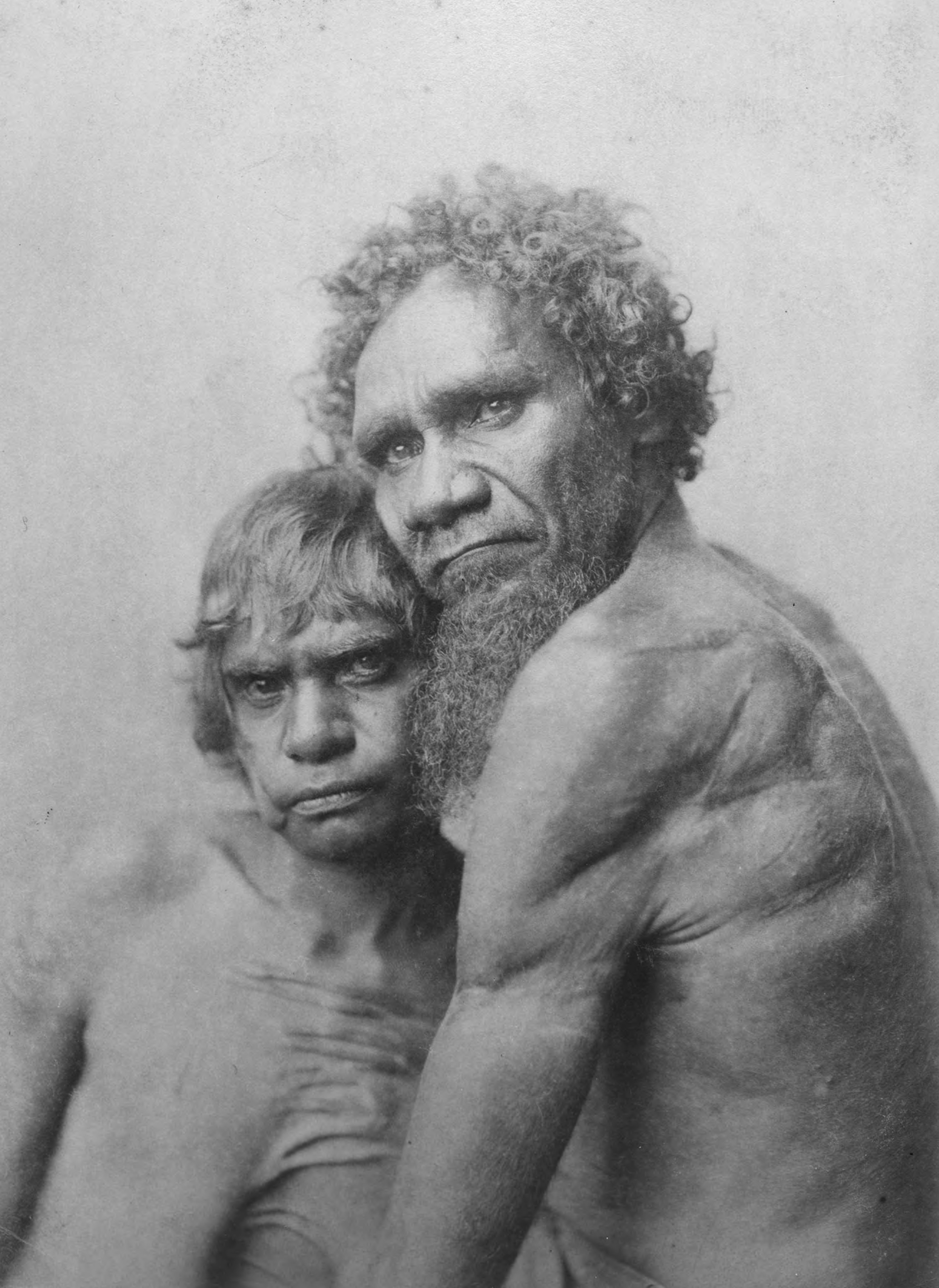
Portrait of Kudajarnd and Langinkab by John William Lindt, 1893

Kudajarnd or Coontajandra (c. 1845 – c. 1905) was a Wakaya man from the Northern Territory who became a Wild Australia Show performer and, later in his life, an elder and senior lawman within his community.

== Early life ==
Very little is known of Kudajarnd's early life and it is an estimation that he was born in the mid-1840s and that he was born on the land of his people, the Wakaya, in the Barkly Region of the Northern Territory. His, and his peoples, first contact with Europeans did not come until 1861 or 1862 when they were approached by William Landsborough who was searching for the missing people from the Burke and Wills expedition. During this period in the early 1860s Kudajarnd was living with his first wife, Langinkab, who was a Wakaya woman.

Following Landsborough's arrival and his report of the conditions, and availability of water, in that area European interest increased and, between 1864 and 1867 a number of pastoral stations were established. Along with the damaging environmental and cultural impacts of the Europeans arrival they also brought with the previously unknown diseases which killed many of the Wakaya and other Aboriginal peoples living in the region and there were also many bloody conflicts between the Europeans and the Wakaya.

By the 1880s Kudajarnd had reached a higher level of initiation within his community and married another woman, Kulindab, who was a Wakaya/Indjalandji woman.

In 1891 Kudajarnd, leading a number of his people, travelled to Lake Nash Station and there he met Brabazon Harry Purcell. Purcell was a stock and station agent who was in the region purchasing Aboriginal artefacts on behalf of Archibald Meston. The group sold Purcell some artefects, which are now at the Pitt Rivers Museum.

Purcell was also recruiting performers for the Wild Australia Show, also for Meston, but it was not until they met some months later, that Kudajarnd, both of his wives and two other Wakaya men Narimbu and Dangakura that had decided to join the show. The group of Wakaya were the first to join the show and their motivations for doing so are not clear; there are accusations that Purcell used force. They then travelled with Purcell to Brisbane with the distance between Townsville and Brisbane being via steamship and they initially understood that they would be away for 2 years.

Meston and Purcell promoted the presence of the Wakaya people, who they called the 'Spinifex people' (which is generally used to refer to the Pila Nguru), in the show and the publicity prepared by them presented them as a 'wild and primitive people' and claimed they had 'not been contaminated by civilization' and that they were 'a lot like children'. As a result of this publicity they received more attention than other people on the show which was made up of 27 Aboriginal people, reportedly from 9 different tribes, with only 5 of these being women and 1 child. While on tour Kudajarnd held a leadership position within the group in recognition of his age, life experience and cultural knowledge as a highly initiated man; he was also considered to be charismatic.

Within the group Kudajarnd also became the most photographed member with many of these photographs taken by John William Lindt and Charles Kerry, his popularity was likely due to his heavy ceremonial scarring and full beard. Kudajarnd was also painted several times by Oscar Fristrom, a Swedish painter who was then based in Brisbane and was known for portraits of Aboriginal Australians. It is most likely that Fristrom painted Kudajarnd from Lindt's pictures taken as there is no record of sittings having occurred and he attributed him as ''Coontajandra"; these painting were also produced in the early years of the 20th century.

The Wild Australia show toured through Brisbane, Sydney and Melbourne between December 1892 and June 1893 and it was planned that they would travel overseas and attend the World's Columbian Exposition, and other international events, but Meston's financial arrangements fell through during the Australian banking crisis of 1893 and he left Kudajarnd, and all of the other performers, stranded in Melbourne and, soon after, he was bankrupt. Despite a lack of resources Kudajarnd was eventually able to return home with the four other Wakaya people and they had reached Camooweal by August 1893.

There are no other records relating to Kudajarnd after this and it is estimated that he likely died around 1905.
