= Mary Costello =

Mary Costello may refer to:

- Mary Ann Costello (1747–1827), Irish actress
- Mary Costello (pastoralist) (1839–1924), pastoralist in the Northern Territory of Australia
- Mary Costello (writer), Irish short story writer and novelist

== See also ==
- Murray Costello
