= Mary Costello (pastoralist) =

Pioneering pastoralist (1839–1924)

- Born: 6 January 1839; Scariff, County Clare, Ireland
- Died: 18 December 1924 (aged 85); Hillston, New South Wales, New South Wales
- Occupation: Pastoralist
- Spouse: John Costello
- Children: Michael, Mary Jane Gertrude, Kate, Ellen, Annie, John Patrick, Patrick
- Parent(s): Patrick Scanlan and wife

Mary Costello (née Scanlan) (6 January 1839 – 18 December 1924) was a pioneering pastoralist in the Northern Territory of Australia.

== Early life ==
Costello was born in County Clare in Ireland, the daughter of Patrick Scanlan and his wife. After immigrating to Australia in 1861, she married John Costello at Grabben Gullen in New South Wales on 7 January 1865. They had two sons before leaving New South Wales for Kyabra Creek in western Queensland. There they had a daughter Mary and later another four children.

== Life in the Northern Territory ==
In 1882 Costello and her husband bought Lake Nash Station. After a year in Ireland, Mary settled her daughters into a convent in Townsville. They bought Valley of the Springs, another isolated property, in 1887. After six years, the couple moved back to Lake Nash around 1891 with seven of their children. They were known for their "close and equitable partnership".

Costello was well-read and politically informed. She was an enthusiastic correspondent. She and her daughters registered to vote in Warnardo in 1894. She was one of the first women in Australia to vote, as the Northern Territory and South Australia were the first to grant women the right to vote.

== Later life ==
The Costellos returned to New South Wales in 1902. They acquired property near Goulburn but both were foreclosed upon by creditors. She died in 1924. She is buried in Hillston.
