= John Costello (pastoralist) =

Australian pastoralist (1838–1923)

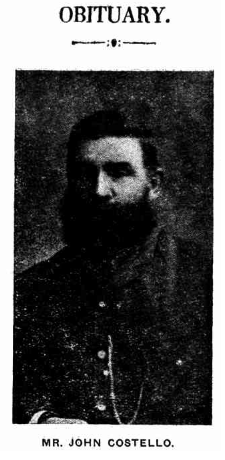
- John Costello
- Born: 31 March 1838; Yass, Colony of New South Wales
- Died: 25 February 1923 (aged 84); Hillston, New South Wales, New South Wales
- Occupation: Pastoralist
- Spouse: Mary Scanlan
- Children: Michael Costello, Patrick Costello and four daughters
- Parent(s): Michael & Mary Costello

John Costello (31 March 1838 – 25 February 1923) was a pioneer and pastoralist in outback Queensland.

== Early life ==
Born in Yass, New South Wales, Costello was the fifth child of Michael and Mary Costello. His father was a store-keeper and grazier who had come to Australia with his wife from Ireland in 1837. All four of his siblings died en route to Australia, the family later had a daughter named Mary. The family had settled in Yass in 1851 after selling their store and acquired 405 hectares (1,000 acres) in the area. Costello quickly became a renowned stockman.

== Pastoral endeavours ==
In 1863 his younger sister, Mary, married Patrick Durack. Costello and Durack both shared a hunger for land and were fascinated by stories of explorers travelling through outback Queensland. In 1863 the pair met William Landsborough and decided to lead a party to acquire land in south west Queensland. Drought conditions almost killed the men, but Costello was encouraged by his wife Mary Scanlan, whom he married in 1865. The Costellos along with Durack formed a depot at Warroo Springs in outback New South Wales then later moved north to Mobel Creek. The Costellos had a son that died of fever, and then they had a daughter. In 1867 Costello overlanded 200 horses from Mobel Creek through uncharted territory to Kapunda, South Australia. Earning £3000 on the sale, Costello returned and acquired the lease to Mobel Springs, a holding of 160 square kilometres (40,000 acres). Costello and Durack moved north again and established both Kyabra and Thylungra Station in 1868 with 100 cattle. In 1869 both drought and depression were taking their toll on the state but Costello continued to acquire lands around the Channel Country and lightly stock them. The 1870s saw better seasons in the area and buyers moved in to acquire land controlled by Costello and Durack. Costello himself held leases over 33,670 square kilometres (13,000 sq mi) of lands through the Channel Country of Queensland.

Costello established many stations through the Channel Country including Kyabra, Davenport Downs, Morney Plains, Currawilla and Connemara Stations.

In 1877 Costello sold Kyabra and bought a racing stud, Cawarral, near Rockhampton and another property near Gladstone. But in 1879 he went back to the bush and acquired Lake Nash Station, which straddles the Northern Territory and Queensland border. While drought was taking its toll on his coastal properties Costello acquired another 5,200 square kilometres (2,000 sq mi) in the Northern Territory.
