= Lake Nash Station =

Cattle station in Northern Territory

Coordinates: 20.98433°S 137.84785°E

Location in Northern Territory

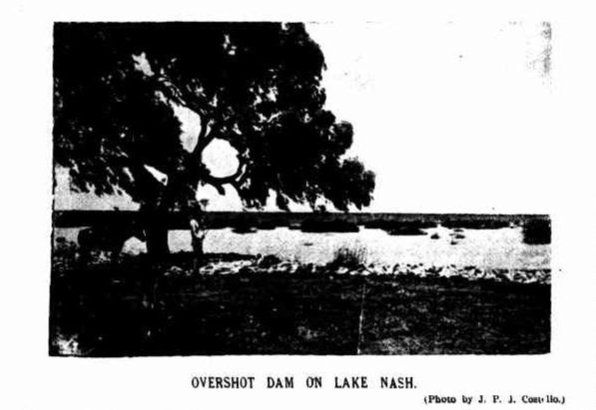
Overshot dam on Lake Nash c. 1902

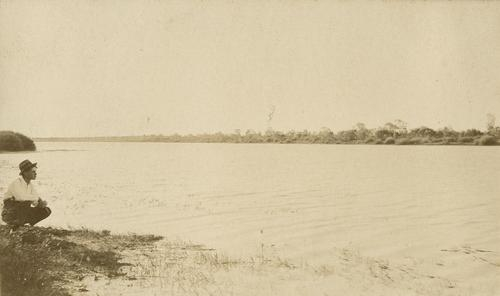
View of Lake Nash c. 1925

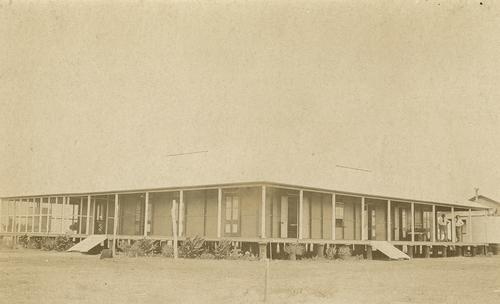
Manager's homestead on Lake Nash Station, c. 1925

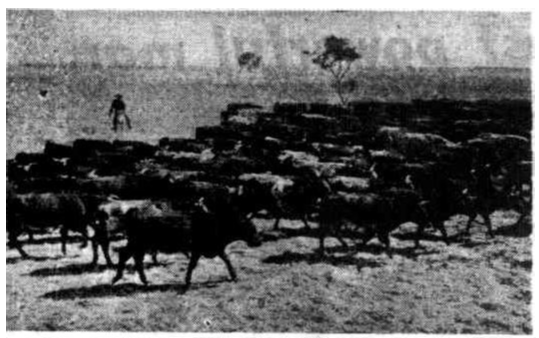
Stock on Murranji Track after being dipped at Lake Nash c. 1953

Lake Nash Station, most commonly known as Lake Nash, is a cattle station on the Barkly Tableland in the Northern Territory, Australia.

== Location ==
It is situated approximately 8 kilometres (5 mi) east of Alpurrurulam and 117 kilometres (73 mi) south of Camooweal. The property shares a boundary with Georgina Downs and Austral Downs to the north, Argadargada to the west, Manners Creek Station to the south and the Queensland border to the east. Several waterways such as the Georgina River, Milne River, Manners Creek, Georgina Creek, Goyder Creek and Gordon Creek cross the property.

== Description ==
The station occupies an area of 12,000 square kilometres (4,633 sq mi), or three million acres, and is bisected by the Georgina River. The property includes the historic homestead and original police station. The area is rolling plains of black soil well covered with Mitchell grass overlaying limestone. The limestone contains many caves, many filled with pools of water; Lake Nash has several, some of which are accessible and reach a depth of over 300 feet (91 m).

== History ==
=== Indigenous people ===
The traditional owners of the area are the Yaroinga people, who inhabited around 11,900 square miles (31,000 km^{2}) of country straddling both the Northern Territory and Queensland including Lake Nash toward the northern edge of their range.

=== Arrival of the British ===
The first British people to enter the region were part of the 1861 expedition of William Landsborough who followed the headwaters of the Georgina River south but turned around just before reaching Lake Nash due to a lack of water.

In 1866, graziers Francis Nash and William Greig overlanded sheep and cattle to the area and established Stony Plains station around a large waterhole of the Georgina River. This waterhole became known as Lake Nash, named after Francis Nash. William Greig brought his wife and daughter to Stony Plains while forming the property. However, a severe drought in 1867 forced Nash and Greig to abandon the station.

In the 1870s crown lands commissioner, Frank Scarr, obtained the lease but appears to have only held it as a speculative investment.

=== Lake Nash station ===
==== Establishment under John Costello ====
The Lake Nash station was formally established by John Costello, the famous frontiersman son of Irish immigrants, who bought the unstocked property in 1879 from Scarr. Costello began to stock the station later the same year when he had 700 head of mixed cattle overlanded from Carrawal where he had previously worked. Fattened cattle were taken overland to Adelaide for market in the 1880s.

The remaining Aboriginal people at Lake Nash were used by Costello as cheap labour and the females were used for sex by itinerant white workers. A traveler to Lake Nash in 1891 reported the Aboriginal people there were starving and reeking with disease. Girls as young as 11 were chronically ill with gonorrhea and syphilis.

In 1892, several Wakaya people were taken from Lake Nash station to perform in the Wild Australia Show.

Costello became insolvent in 1903 and the Queensland National Bank subsequently acquired the property.

==== Development during the 20th century ====
The area was subjected to severe flooding in 1901 when Lake Nash experienced over 10 inches (254 mm) of rain in a single day, with the Georgina River running at almost record high levels. The area was inundated with 12 inches (305 mm) of rain in 1909, enough to get all the rivers running and reopen closed stock routes.

In 1915 the station was acquired by the Queensland National Pastoral Company, which had been formed to take over the pastoral properties owned by the Queensland National Bank. The company had raised capital of £850,000 and had invested in properties totalling 9,362 square miles (24,247 km^{2})in area, of which Lake Nash comprised 2,808 square miles (7,273 km^{2}).

Two Aboriginal men known as Dynamite Joe and Paddy Fraser were arguing over a woman when Joe attacked Fraser with an axe causing severe abdominal injuries. Fraser died en route to Cloncurry from internal injuries. Joe made his escape but was later caught and sent back to Lake Nash for trial.

In 1917 some 800 head of cattle were stolen from the station with two men, Thomas Hanlan and James Wickham, being arrested after they were found in possession of 200 of the stolen cattle near Frew River. Both men were found to be guilty and sentenced to five years hard labour and fined £100.

By 1923 the size of the property was estimated at 3,400 square miles (8,806 km^{2}) and was one of the larger runs in the Northern Territory, although it was dwarfed by the largest of the day, Victoria River Downs, which occupied 13,100 square miles (33,929 km^{2}).

In the late 1920s and early 1930s, many Alyawarre speaking people to the southwest of the station migrated to Lake Nash to avoid the police and settler violence associated with the Coniston massacres. They were also attracted to the opportunities of obtaining work and rations there.

In 1950, Lake Nash came under scrutiny for using slave labour on the property. The station was allowed to use much cheaper native labour only if white labour was not available, but this rule had been found to have been seriously breached by the station owners. The Queensland National Pastoral Company, who still owned Lake Nash at the time, were not paying their Aboriginal workers at all or giving them enough food to live. Eventually the Aboriginal workers were paid £2 per month with half of this being inaccessible to them. Those who worked as pumpers received £1 per week, which was only an eighth of what white workers were paid.

The property was in the grip of drought in 1952 with less than a quarter of the normal number of cattle being led along the Murranji Track. The surrounding areas then received over 4 inches (102 mm) of rain in March 1953 resulting in the Georgina River rising over 23 feet (7 m), the highest level in over 36 years. The following year the property was hit by drought with only 2 inches (51 mm) of rain falling in the first eight months; this in turn meant that cattle could not be moved far from waterholes or bores, as little water lay along the stock routes.

In the mid-1960s, with the rise of equal pay and human rights, Aboriginal workers were pushed off the station as the cheap labour they provided was replaced with more mechanised methods. Most were forced into unemployment and dumped at Alpurrurulam.

==== Georgina Pastoral Company ====
The station was acquired by the Georgina Pastoral Company, a partnership between Peter Hughes and Bill Scott, and Scott's son George took up management of the property in 2004. After suffering a drought through 2008 the area received good rains in the summer of 2009 when the property was still being managed by George Scott and had 20-25 employees working on the station. The station is made up of three separate leases that are run as one entity – Lake Nash, Georgina Downs and Argadargada – and has a carrying capacity of 55,000 head in a good season including approximately 30,000 cross-bred breeders. The herd is a mix of Santa Gertrudis, Brahman, Charbrais, Senepol and Waggui cattle.

In 2009, the partnership between the Scott family and the Hughes family dissolved and since then the Georgina Pastoral Company, including Lake Nash station, has been run by the Hughes family as a subsidiary of their Hughes Pastoral Group. The primary focus being the production of wagyu beef cattle.

== See also ==
- List of ranches and stations
- List of the largest stations in Australia
