= Wild Australia Show =

Indigenous Australian travelling theatre troupe

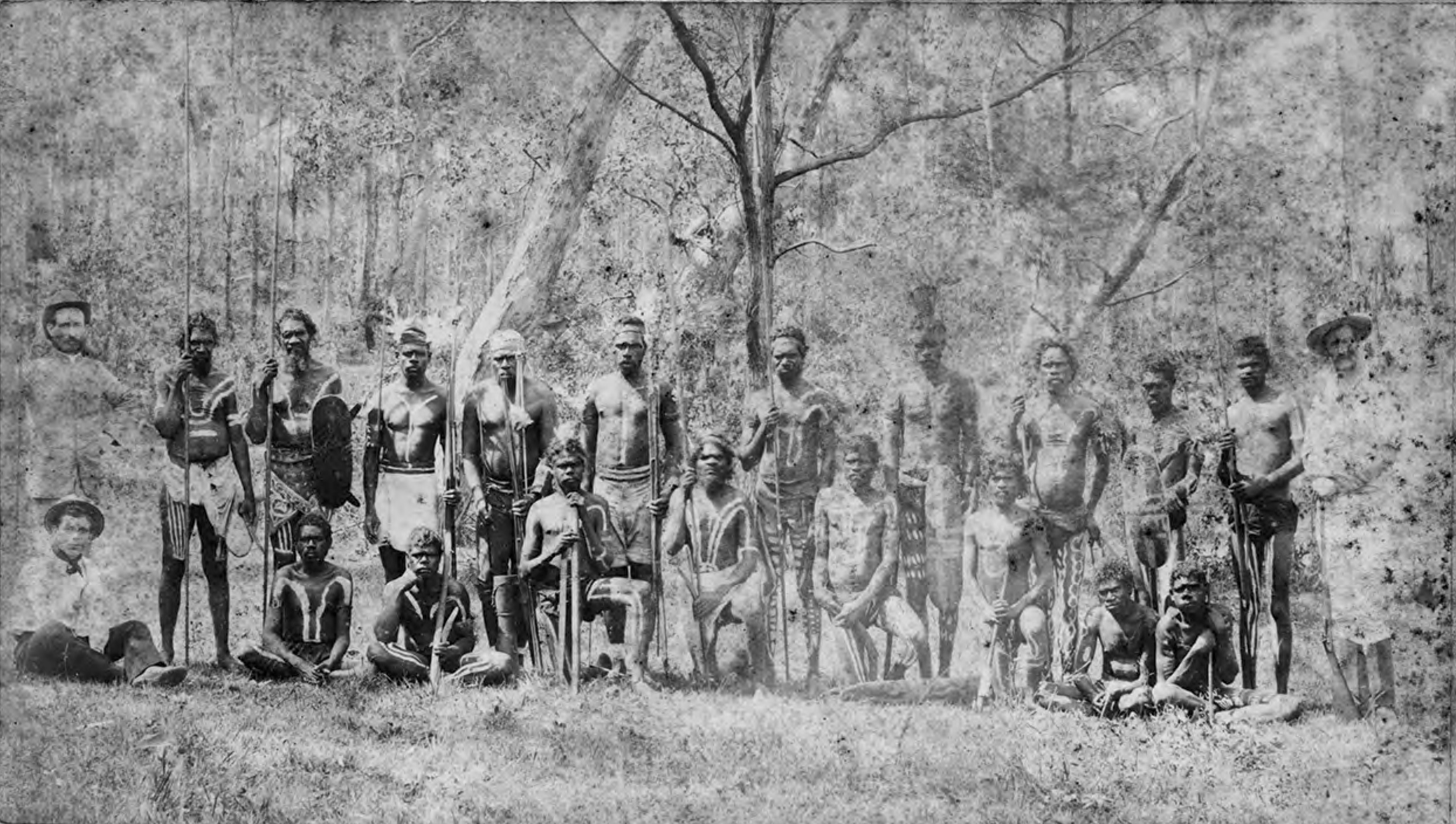
Wild Australia Show performers pictured on an 1892 greeting card

The Wild Australia Show was a troupe of Indigenous Australian performers that toured Australia during 1892 and 1893. The group was formed by the Scottish-born businessman Archibald Meston and his business partner Brabazon Harry Purcell with the intention of performing in Australia, New Zealand, and Europe on the way to Chicago to perform at the World's Columbian Exposition. The troupe comprised 27 people—21 men, 5 women, and 1 child—from across northern Queensland and the surrounding region.

The Indigenous performers were recruited by Purcell during 1891 and 1892. Their motivations for joining the tour are unknown; scholars have suggested that some may have been kidnapped or coerced, while others may have sought an escape from violent and oppressive conditions on the Queensland frontier. Inspired by the ethnological expositions popular in the colonial era, as well as by Wild West shows like Buffalo Bill's Wild West, the troupe's performances included dances, corroborees, demonstrations of spear and boomerang throwing, and stagings of scenes inspired by the Australian frontier wars. Meston and Purcell acted as narrators and provided commentary on Aboriginal culture during each performance. The group performed in Brisbane, Sydney, and Melbourne. They were photographed during their tour at the studios of the photographers Charles Kerry, John William Lindt, and Henry King.

Facing financial pressures and contractual disputes, Meston abandoned the troupe in Melbourne in 1893, leaving Purcell and the performers stranded without the funds to return home. Purcell made attempts to continue their planned world tour but was eventually forced to return to Queensland. The performers returned to their lands and largely faded from the historical record. The failed endeavour led to criticism of Meston for his abandonment of the troupe, as well as accusations of kidnapping and a fierce legal battle between the two former business partners.

== Background ==
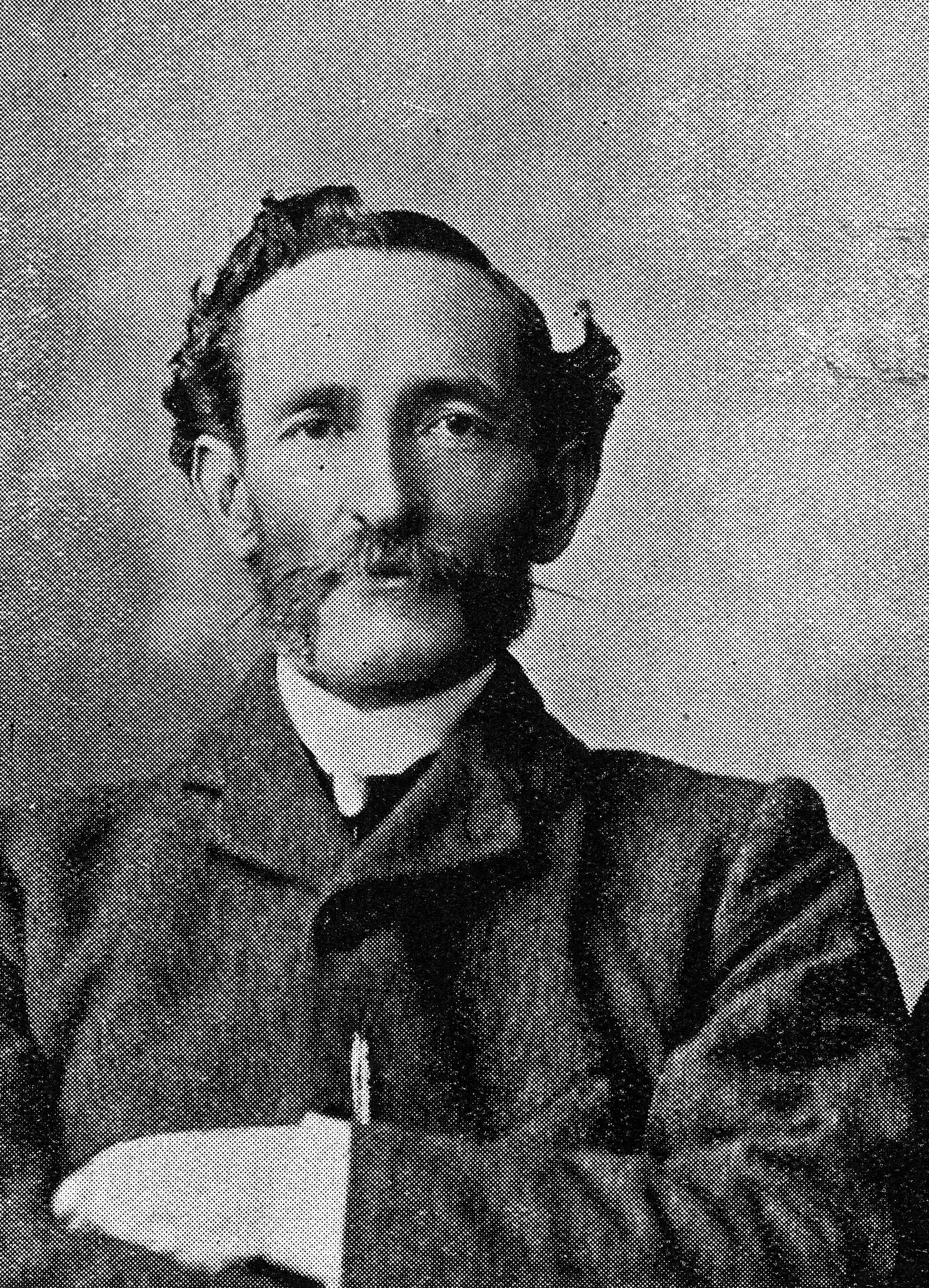
Archibald Meston, pictured in 1901

In 1851, Archibald Meston was born in Scotland, and emigrated to the Colony of New South Wales with his family as a child. He moved to Queensland in 1874, where he managed a sugar plantation and became a successful journalist. He became the editor of the Ipswich Observer in 1876 and published articles in The Queenslander. Meston was elected to the Queensland Legislative Assembly in 1878, but was forced out of his seat in 1881 after declaring bankruptcy following a failed coal mining venture. He moved to North Queensland, where he became the editor of the Townsville Herald and established a sugar plantation near Cairns. After the collapse of his sugar business, he made a series of speculative property investments; these ventures ended in failure, resulting in accusations of fraud from those who had lost money in a failed settlement scheme near the Russell River.

Meston, who had once openly espoused virulently racist views, developed an interest in Aboriginal culture and joined the Aborigines' Protection Society of Queensland in 1890. He began to employ more admiring rhetoric towards Indigenous Australians, describing their treatment by colonists as "a reproach to our common humanity", while also supporting assimilationist policies that aimed to eradicate Indigenous cultures. He began to present himself as an ethnologist and an expert on Aboriginal peoples. He often praised the athleticism of Aboriginal Australians and spoke of his admiration for their prowess as warriors. He presented the first of what he termed "illustrated lectures" on Aboriginal Australians at the Theatre Royal in Brisbane on 29 September 1891. Meston's early lectures—which featured live Aboriginal people, painted bush scenes, and taxidermied animals—became the model for the Wild Australia Show.

In late 1891 it was reported that Meston was assembling an Aboriginal performance troupe to travel to the World's Columbian Exposition in Chicago. His plan was for the troupe to perform in Australia, New Zealand, and Europe, before finishing their tour in Chicago. Meston was joined in the endeavour by Brabazon Purcell, a journalist and stock and station agent he had met during an 1891 Aborigines' Protection Society event, who was promised one-third of the profits. The pair borrowed a substantial sum of money to pursue the project, hoping that it would prove a commercial success. Meston later said that he had spent more than £1000 (equivalent to $162,000 in 2022) on the show and that he had been motivated primarily by the "benefit of the aboriginals".

== History ==
=== Recruitment of performers ===
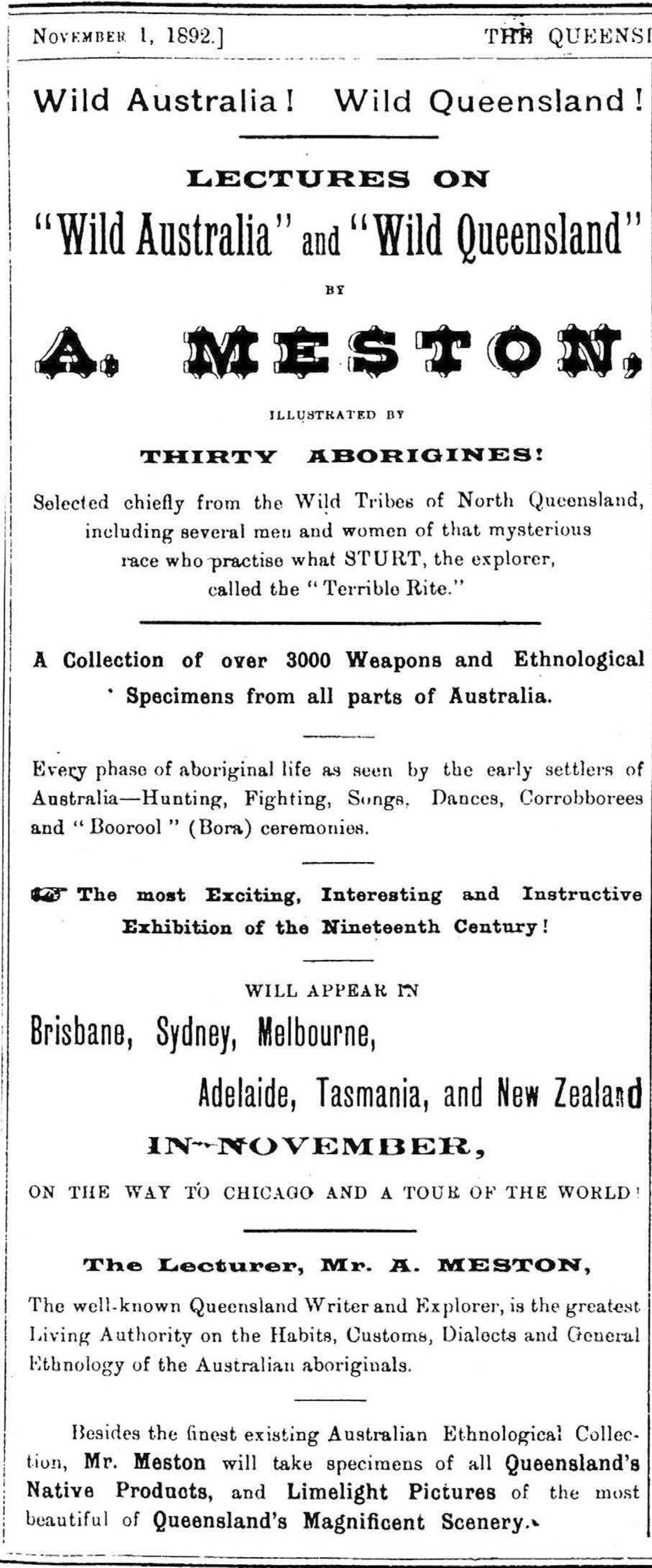
Newspaper advertisement for the Wild Australia Show published in the Queensland Punch, 1 November 1892

Meston and Purcell's recruitment of Indigenous performers took place between November 1891 and October 1892. Meston insisted that all of the Aboriginal performers be physically fit to illustrate his vision of the athleticism of Aboriginal Australians. Purcell set out on an expedition across northern Australia to recruit Aboriginal performers and collect artefacts, while Meston worked to secure financing for the tour. Purcell began by visiting the rainforest region surrounding Cairns and climbed Mount Bellenden Ker. While he did not recruit any performers during this initial expedition, he collected a number of artefacts that were likely among the props used during the Wild Australia Show.

Purcell then travelled to the frontier region of north-western Queensland near the Northern Territory border. In late 1891 or early 1892, Purcell met the first group of Aboriginal people to join the Wild Australia Show: five Wakaya people from near Lake Nash, including an elder named Kudajarnd and two of his wives. How Purcell convinced this group to join him is unknown; he was later accused of kidnapping or coercing some Aboriginal performers, but it is likely that others joined willingly. The anthropologist Paul Memmott has suggested that some may have felt that they had few better options available to them given the violence that they faced on their own lands. Purcell arranged to reunite with the Wakaya group a few months later. In late July 1892, Purcell brought the five Wakaya people back to Townsville, and on 3 August he arrived in Brisbane to hand the group over to Meston.

Purcell left Brisbane three days later to travel to Normanton, where he collected Aboriginal people from a variety of tribal groups who had been assembled by middlemen in the southern Gulf of Carpentaria. These individuals are believed to have been recruited by police officers with whom Meston had made arrangements earlier that year. He collected five Aboriginal people from the Kimberley Town Camp and eleven from camps in the town of Croydon. Most had likely been displaced into the camps by the violent settler incursions into their lands that had begun in the 1860s and 1870s. Memmott suggests that some element of coercion was likely involved in their recruitment to the Wild Australia Show.

Purcell then travelled to Thursday Island in the Torres Strait to collect a group of Kaurareg people who had been brought there from Muralug (also known as Prince of Wales Island) after being recruited by public servants whom Purcell was using as agents. The group included Gida, a Kaurareg chief, and his wife and adopted son. On 14 September, Purcell arrived in Cairns with the 21 Indigenous people he had collected from across the Gulf of Carpentaria and the Torres Strait, before continuing on to Brisbane. There, the 26 recruits assembled at a camp in St Lucia to begin their rehearsals.

The last member recruited to the Wild Australia Show was a Kabi Kabi man named Yamurra who had previously appeared in Meston's lectures. He arrived one month after rehearsals had begun. Fluent in English and the only performer from southern Queensland, Yamurra was likely recruited by Meston to act as a liaison between the other Indigenous performers and white Australians. He travelled alone to the camp in St Lucia by train from Maryborough.

=== Rehearsals and initial performances in Brisbane ===
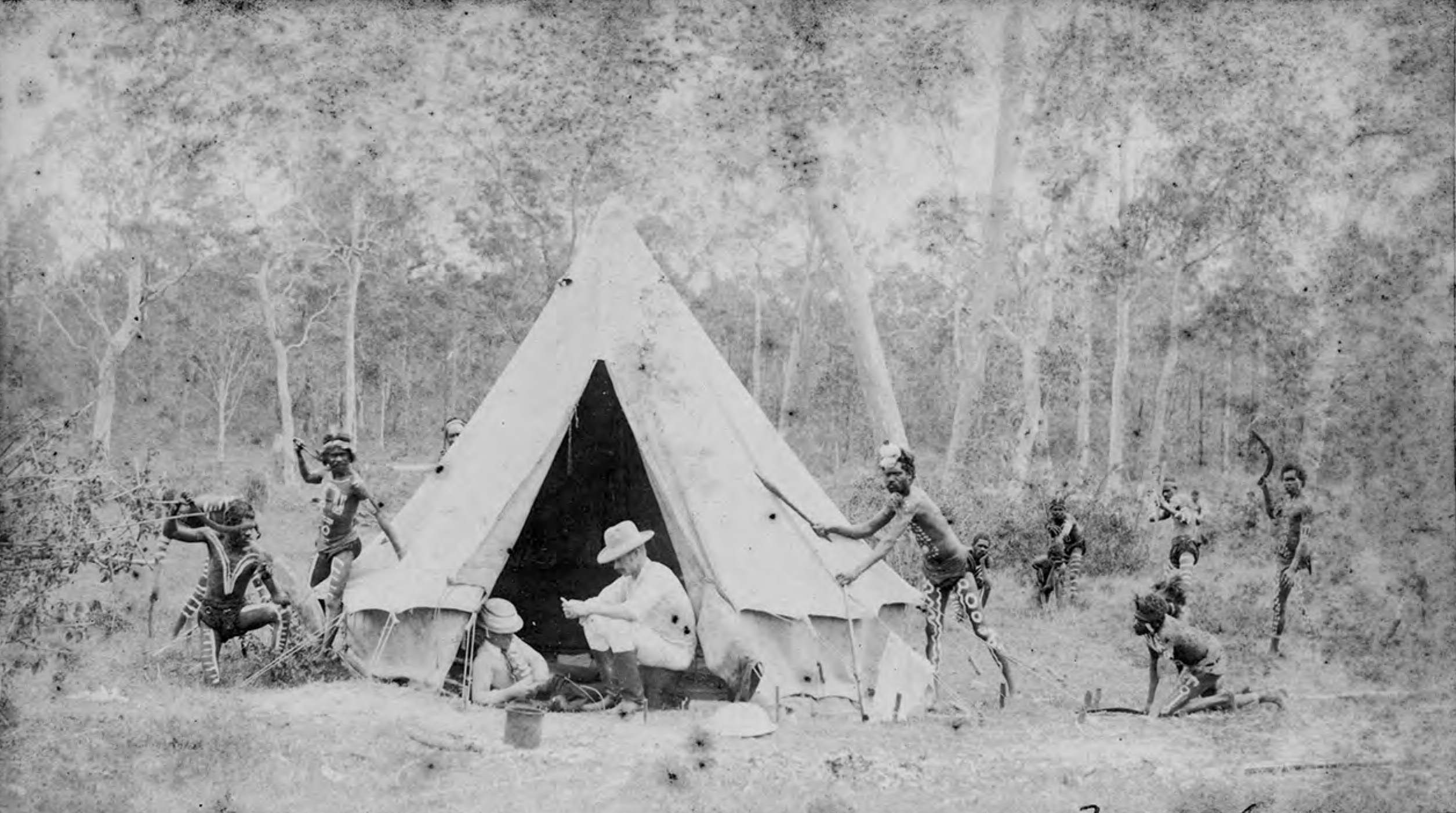
A frontier conflict scene shown on an 1892 greeting card, featuring Archibald Meston and his son being ambushed by members of the troupe

The troupe spent several months rehearsing in St Lucia between late September and November 1892. Meston drummed up substantial media interest in his planned tour and attracted many visitors to the rehearsal camp. One of these visitors was the painter Oscar Fristrom, who painted a portrait of a Walangama performer named Werdbura. Advertisements and newspaper articles began to be published about the upcoming show. They often referred to the Wakaya tradition of penile subincision; the practice, known as "Sturt's terrible rite", had become notorious among the settler population. Many newspapers referred to the performers as part of a "doomed race", echoing the popular notion at the time that Indigenous Australians were destined for extinction. Others suggested that the show would correct the misconceptions that audiences had been taught and would show them "the true character of the wild tribes of Australia".

The opening performance was held at Her Majesty's Opera House in Brisbane on 5 December 1892. The performance was positively received, although some reviewers criticised Meston's commentary as overly long-winded and expressed their wish that the Indigenous performers had simply been allowed to perform uninterrupted. The show's audience soon dwindled, and it moved to weekly outdoor performances at the Breakfast Creek Sportsground and then at the Exhibition Grounds, where it attracted much larger audiences.

=== Performances in Sydney ===
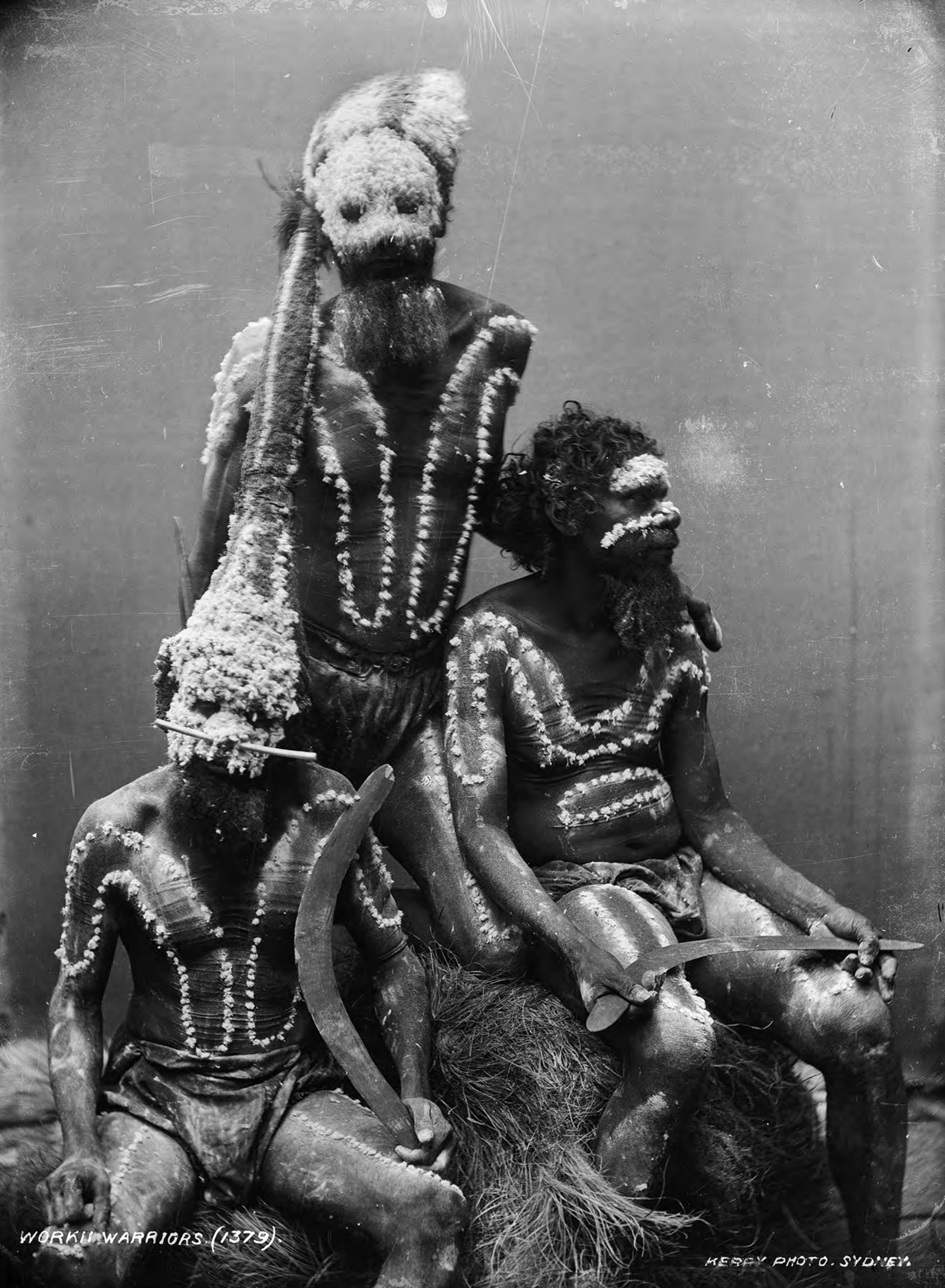
Three of the Kaurareg members of the Wild Australia Show troupe wearing dhari, photographed by Charles Kerry in January 1893

The troupe travelled to Sydney and gave its opening performance at the Bondi Aquarium on 26 December 1892. They quickly came under scrutiny from New South Wales government officials, who were alarmed by their lack of control over the Indigenous performers. Unlike the Queensland government, which did not have a dedicated protection office for managing its Aboriginal population, the New South Wales government was pursuing a strict policy of segregation and wished to remove Aboriginal people from the city of Sydney entirely. Despite scrutiny from the authorities, the troupe attracted large crowds and began staging daily afternoon and nighttime performances. It was reported in The Sydney Morning Herald that the opening performance attracted a crowd of 10,000 people. During their time in Sydney, the performers were photographed by Charles Kerry at his studio near the Aquarium; the photographs were offered for sale to the public and were eventually turned into postcards.

In January 1893, the troupe began performing a condensed nightly show at the School of Arts as part of the Walshe Family Circus, along with regular afternoon performances at the Bondi Aquarium. Due to the smaller size of the stage, this version of the show omitted the spear and boomerang throwing demonstrations and instead focused on acting and dancing scenes.

Reviews during the show's time in Sydney were not all positive. One review in The Daily Telegraph described the performers as "merely an indiscriminate assortment of blackfellows ... having no proper supervision, and run purely as speculation". Concern about a lack of supervision was a common refrain; the New South Wales Aborigines Protection Board, fearing that the performers might be left unsupervised in the city and unhappy with the "unseemly spectacle" of their presence, sought to have the show shut down throughout its time in the city. The board was also determined to avoid a repeat of a prior incident in which a troupe of 100 Aboriginal performers had been brought to Sydney and then abandoned in the city. The Aborigines Protection Board placed the troupe under police surveillance and sent a letter to the Queensland government inquiring whether Meston had been permitted to take his Indigenous performers out of the state. Meston attempted to soothe the board's concerns, while increasingly facing pressure from those who had lent him money for the tour.

=== Performances in Melbourne ===
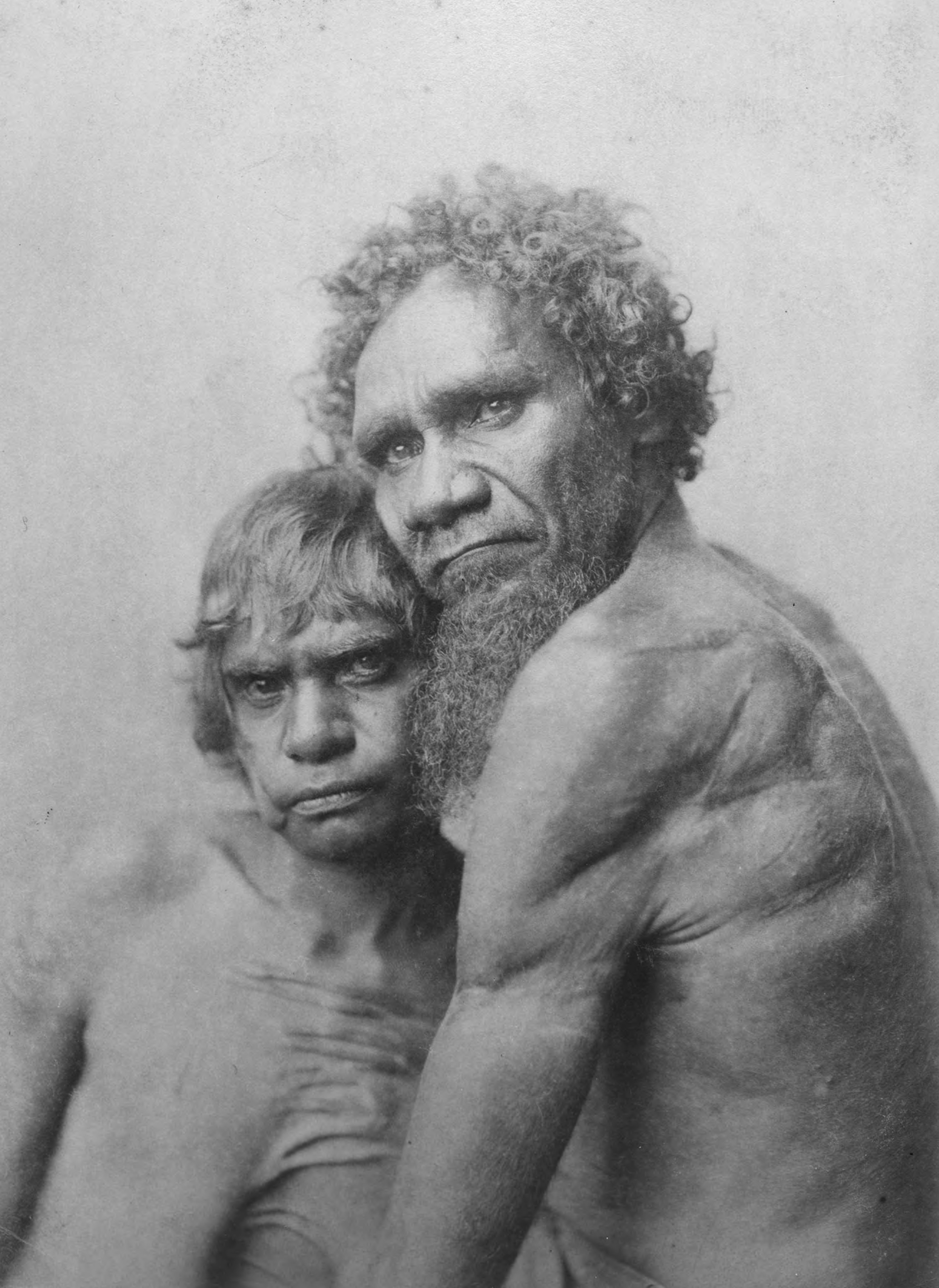
Photograph of Kudajarnd and wife Langinkab taken by John William Lindt during the troupe's time in Melbourne

The troupe arrived in Melbourne for the next stop of their tour on 25 January 1893. Meston and Purcell had booked a performance as part of the Australian Natives' Association fête at the Royal Exhibition Building. While the fête attracted a crowd of about 50,000, the Wild Australia Show received a less positive reception from its audiences. Melbourne was experiencing a severe economic depression caused by the banking crisis of 1893, which led many residents of the city to lack interest in the performance, and the members of the troupe had become exhausted by their long tour. Meston was also faced with financial difficulties and a dispute over contractual terms with the Australian Natives' Association.

The commercial dispute caused a breakdown in the relationship between Meston and Purcell. Meston returned to Sydney, abandoning Purcell and the performers in Melbourne. With the show in substantial debt and the troupe stranded in Melbourne, Purcell attempted to book additional performances to allow them to continue their tour. Newspapers blamed Meston for abandoning the troupe, while Meston, who was attempting to raise funds by selling a collection of artefacts to the Australian Museum, defended himself and blamed Purcell and the Australian Natives' Association for the troupe's predicament. The dispute caused a media scandal, with newspapers widely criticising Meston's abandonment of the troupe.

Purcell was still hopeful that the troupe could continue its planned tour of England and Chicago. He borrowed money to continue the show and booked a performance at the National Baby Show on 16 February. He also began to stage more sensationalised acts to revive the curiosity of audiences, including a scene depicting Aboriginal cannibalism and a lecture on "Sturt's terrible rite". On 6 March, the troupe began to perform afternoon and evening weekday performances at the Rotunda Hall, where it was positively received and attracted sizeable audiences.

=== Second season in Sydney and journey home ===
On 22 May, Purcell and the performers returned to Sydney. Purcell had secured a booking for the troupe to perform in the play It Is Never Too Late to Mend, which opened on 27 May in a production staged by George Rignold at Her Majesty's Theatre. The troupe performed dances and acted in background roles during the play. Their performance received favourable reviews, with one critic writing that "nothing more striking has ever been witnessed in this city".

Meston lobbied the Queensland government to put a stop to the tour, writing to the colonial secretary that Purcell was likely to mistreat the performers and that the planned world tour "ought not to be allowed". The New South Wales Aborigines Protection Board also wrote to the Queensland government to ask that the performers be returned to Queensland. By late June, the Queensland government agreed that the performers should be returned to their lands. The following month, Purcell abandoned his hope of continuing the planned world tour and appealed to the Queensland government for financial assistance in returning home. The Queensland and New South Wales governments debated who should bear the £65 cost of feeding the performers and transporting them back to Brisbane, until the Queensland government eventually agreed to pay.

The performers arrived in Brisbane on 14 July, although one performer (likely either Bula or Dugum, two of the Kaurareg performers) decided to remain in Sydney after being offered employment. The employment arrangement quickly fell through and the man returned to Queensland a week later. The performers continued their journeys from Brisbane to ports in northern Queensland, from where the police helped to escort them back to their lands. Following their return, all of the performers with the exception of Gida left little trace in the historical record.

=== Court case and aftermath ===
Purcell was arrested in Sydney on 11 July after Meston alleged that he had stolen money, but the case was quickly dismissed. Charges against Purcell were dismissed for a second time after he was arrested upon his return to Brisbane. Allegations began to surface that Purcell had used violence and coercion to force some of the Indigenous performers to join the Wild Australia Show; Meston denied involvement and blamed Purcell for any coercion, saying that he had given Purcell strict instructions to ensure the performers joined voluntarily.

Soon after the performers had returned to their lands, Purcell sued Meston for "false imprisonment, malicious prosecution, and slander". Purcell sought damages of £1500 (equivalent to $260,000 in 2022), while Meston launched a £2000 civil counter-suit for injuries to his "credit, reputation and character". Meston's suit proved unsuccessful, while Purcell was awarded damages of £50 (equivalent to $10,000 in 2022). The lawsuits left a detailed historical record in the form of court documents, and are the source for much of what is known about the Wild Australia Show's tour.

== Performance ==
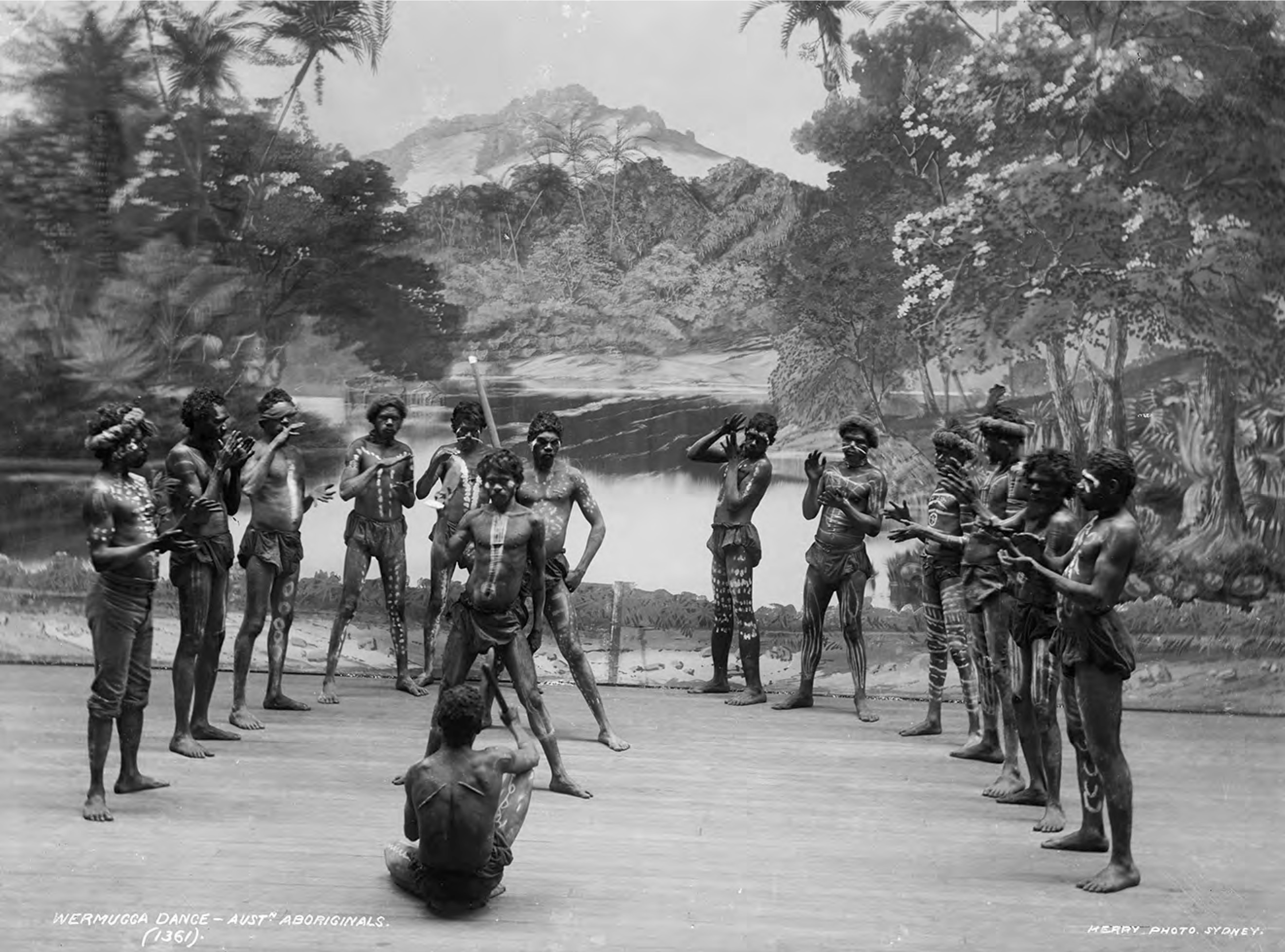
The Wild Australia Show performing on an indoor stage in front of backdrop showing Mount Bellenden Ker

The Wild Australia Show's performances evolved over the course of the tour as the performers adapted to suit a variety of venues and audiences. The shows included demonstrations of skill, such as spear and boomerang throwing and staged conflicts, as well as ceremonial performances, corroborees, and dances. Meston acted as a narrator, delivering lectures to the audience between scenes and explaining the cultures and practices of the performers. At times, Meston himself would participate in displays of combat with the Aboriginal performers. Performers from the distinct cultural groups that made up the troupe performed dances inspired by their own traditions; for instance, Kaurareg dances were characterised by their use of drumming and masks, while the Wakaya members of the troupe would perform in feathered headdresses. Memmott suggests that the performers were likely given a significant degree of creative control and developed the performance based on their own cultures and traditions. The outdoor performances featured athletic and pyrotechnic displays, such as the throwing of flaming spears and boomerangs and the staged burning of a settler's hut, while the performances held indoors featured more detailed lectures from Meston and Purcell.

Each performance opened with a war dance within a staged camp. This was followed by a series of five corroborees: the Wermugga (Cockatoo), Rengwinna (Goanna), Fish, Waka Linga (Crocodile), and Rah Min (Adolescents). The show included at least 11 distinct dances. Each performance ended with a staged scene of conflict inspired by the Australian frontier wars (a series of violent conflicts between settlers and Indigenous peoples that was ongoing at the time). The frontier scene showed innocent settlers being attacked by Aboriginal warriors, who were then shot and killed by the Native Police. Memmott has described the show's depiction of white settler innocence and Aboriginal aggression as an example of "settler denialism", calling it a "colonial fantasy [that] played into convenient mythologies about frontier life". The show took inspiration from Wild West shows, particularly from Buffalo Bill's Wild West, which often depicted an attack on a homestead as its final act. It was also inspired by American minstrel shows, which were popular in Queensland at the time.

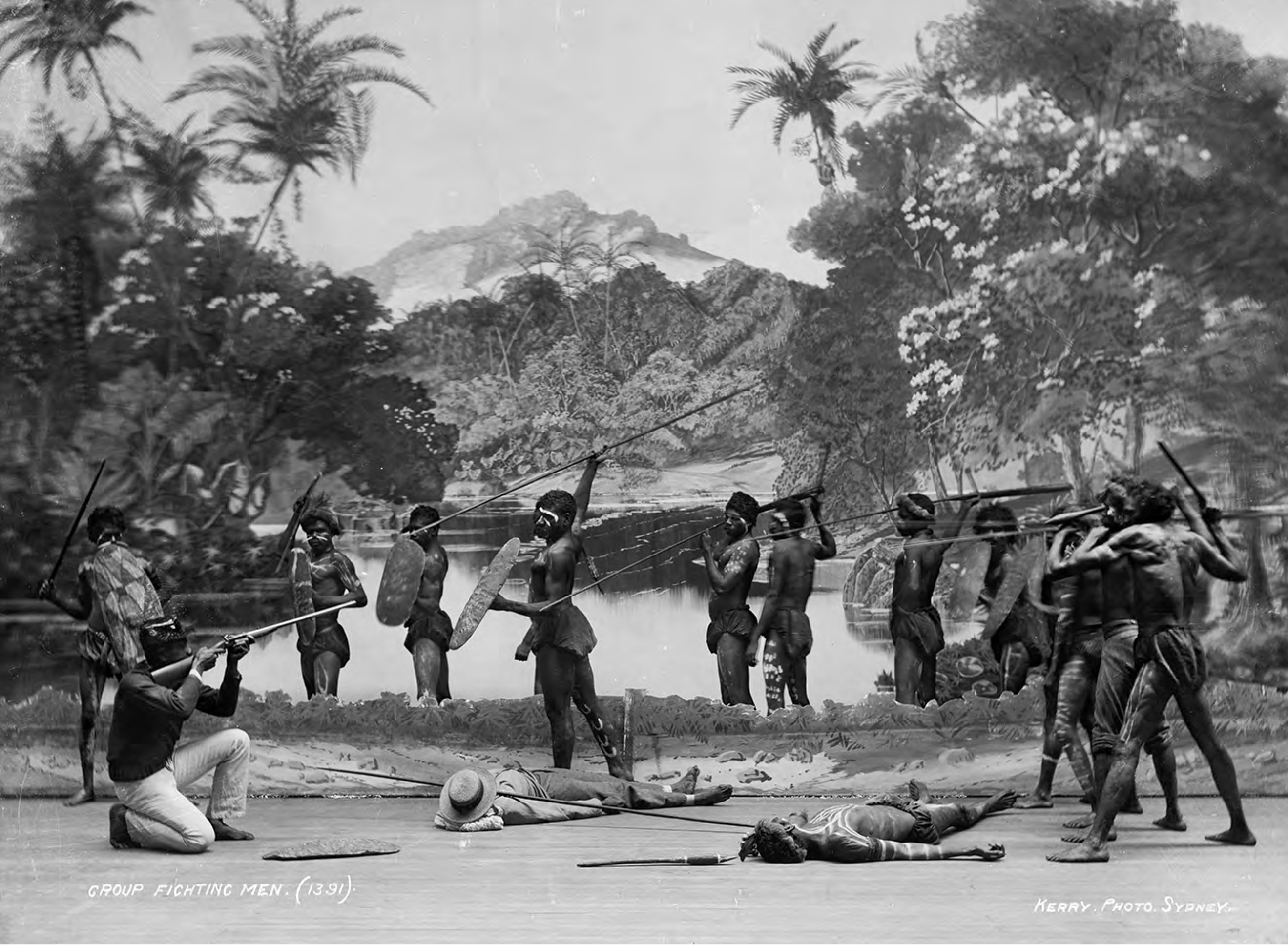
The final scene of the performance portrayed a confrontation between white settlers, Aboriginal warriors, and Native Police.

The stage featured a set of backdrops painted by the South African-born artist Carl William Vennermark. At least three backdrops were painted; one featured Mount Bellenden Ker, another featured the Russell River, and the subject of the third backdrop was not recorded. Taxidermied animals, including kangaroos and cassowaries, were loaned from the Queensland Museum and used as stage props. The stage was also decorated with gunyahs. A collection of around 2000 artefacts and specimens was assembled to be used and displayed during the show. What became of this collection remains unknown, but it is believed that many of the artefacts became part of museum collections or were sold at auction. A 2021 study examined archival records and transactions between Meston and the Queensland Museum, but concluded that it was impossible to conclusively associate any of the artefacts held by the museum with the Wild Australia Show collection.

== Legacy ==
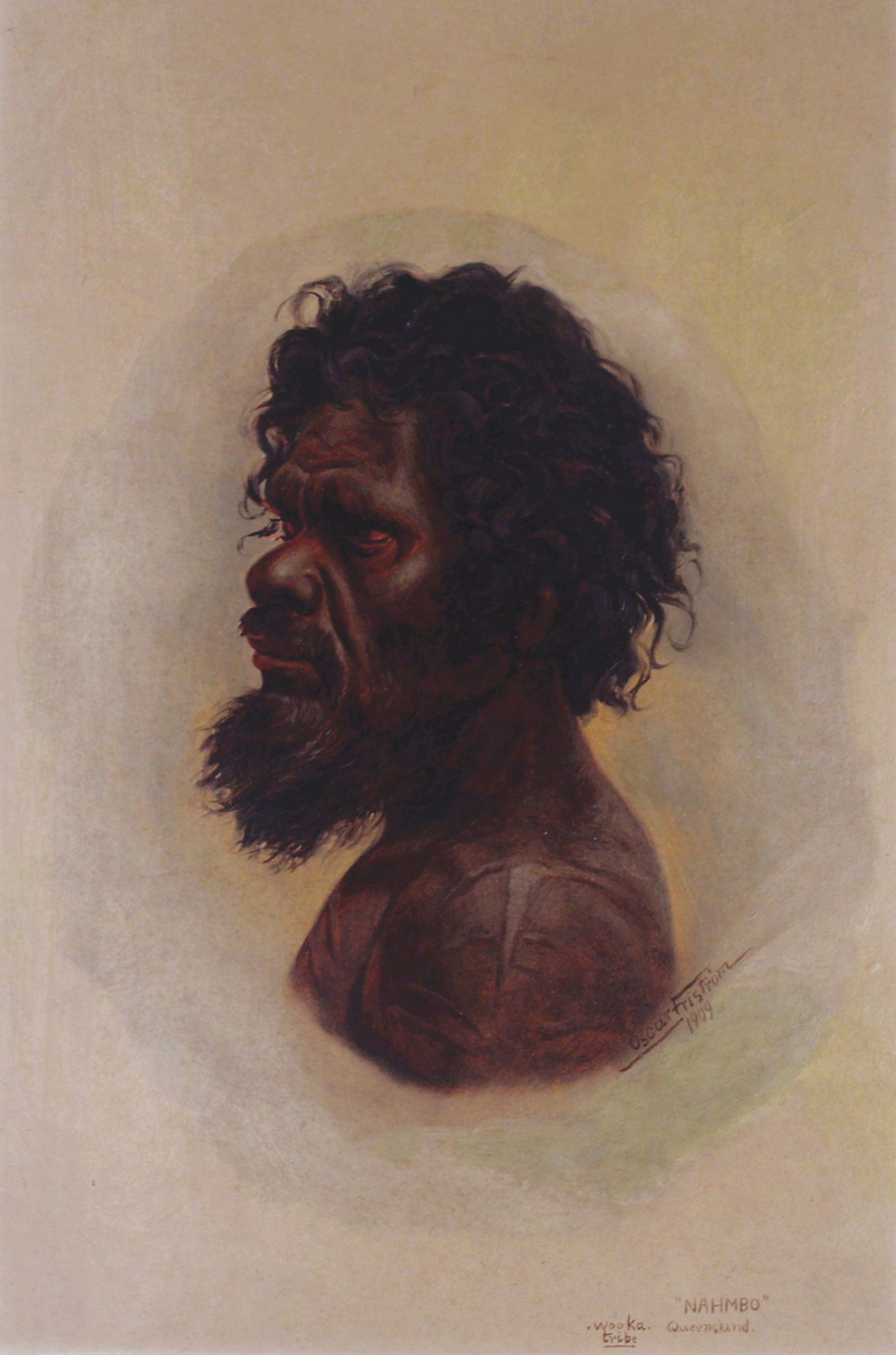
Nahmbo, a 1909 painting of Narimbu by Oscar Fristrom

During their tour the performers were photographed by several of Australia's leading photographers, including Charles Kerry, John William Lindt, and Henry King. Many of these images became widely circulated and reproduced, but often without naming the performers or the connection with the Wild Australia Show. At least eight of the photographs taken by Charles Kerry were later turned into postcards. Some photographs of the performers were also used as inspiration for other artworks. Among these was an 1897 bust of Kungkardi by James White based on one of Henry King's photographs, which is now held by the Art Gallery of New South Wales. Fristrom painted a portrait of the performer Narimbu titled Nahmbo in 1909 based on one of Charles Kerry's photographs.

In 2025, researchers reported that 150 photographs of the Wild Australia Show troupe had been identified, many of which were originally uncaptioned or mislabelled. The photographic historian Michael Aird has attempted to re-assemble an archive of images of the Wild Australia Show troupe. An exhibition of these photographs curated by Aird, Memmott, and the curator Mandana Mapar titled Wild Australia was staged at the Queensland Anthropology Museum in 2015. A selection of photographs of the performers was displayed at the Sydney Opera House later that year. Between 2017 and 2018, Aird and Memmott undertook a travelling exhibition through regional areas in northern Australia, including the traditional lands of many of the show's performers. In 2021, Aird and Memmott published the first known set of properly labelled portrait photographs of all 27 performers.
