= Museum of Lands, Mapping and Surveying =

Museum in Brisbane, Queensland, Australia

Coordinates: 27.4651°S 153.0250°E

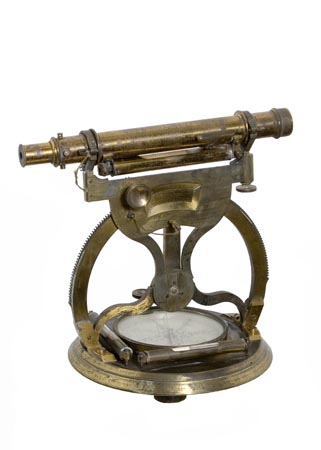
Compass theodolite, Museum of Lands, Mapping and Surveying

The Museum of Lands, Mapping and Surveying is a museum at 317 Edward Street, Brisbane, Queensland, Australia. It collects and exhibits material relating to the surveying of Queensland and the maps created. It is a sub-branch of the Queensland Museum. It actively digitises and makes available historic maps and aerial imagery under open licences.

== Collections ==
Land exploration and surveying has played a crucial role in the development of Queensland. Surveyors and cartographers played an active part in establishing Queensland's borders, physically surveying the land as well as creating maps, survey plans and registers.

The historical input of the surveying and mapping industry to the development of Queensland is an important factor in the role the department plays in providing a valuable resource for a wide range of community interests and government.

In its short history the museum has established a comprehensive collection, housing many important maps, survey plans and artefacts, significant to the history of mapping, surveying and land development particularly in Queensland.

The museum acquires, preserves, catalogues and displays information and artefacts pertaining to historical land settlement, surveying and cartographic activities in Queensland.

=== Collection strategy ===
The museum aims to identify records, artefacts, maps and plans that are useful in filling gaps in the knowledge about the history of mapping and surveying in Queensland, and make such knowledge accessible. New material is constantly being identified as important for research purposes.

== Historical collections ==
The museum's physical and digital collections include:

- historical maps and plans
- historical photographs
- aerial photography
- artefacts
- biographies of surveyors and cartographers
- documents (e.g. early Queensland Treasury rental sheets)
- publications.

== History ==
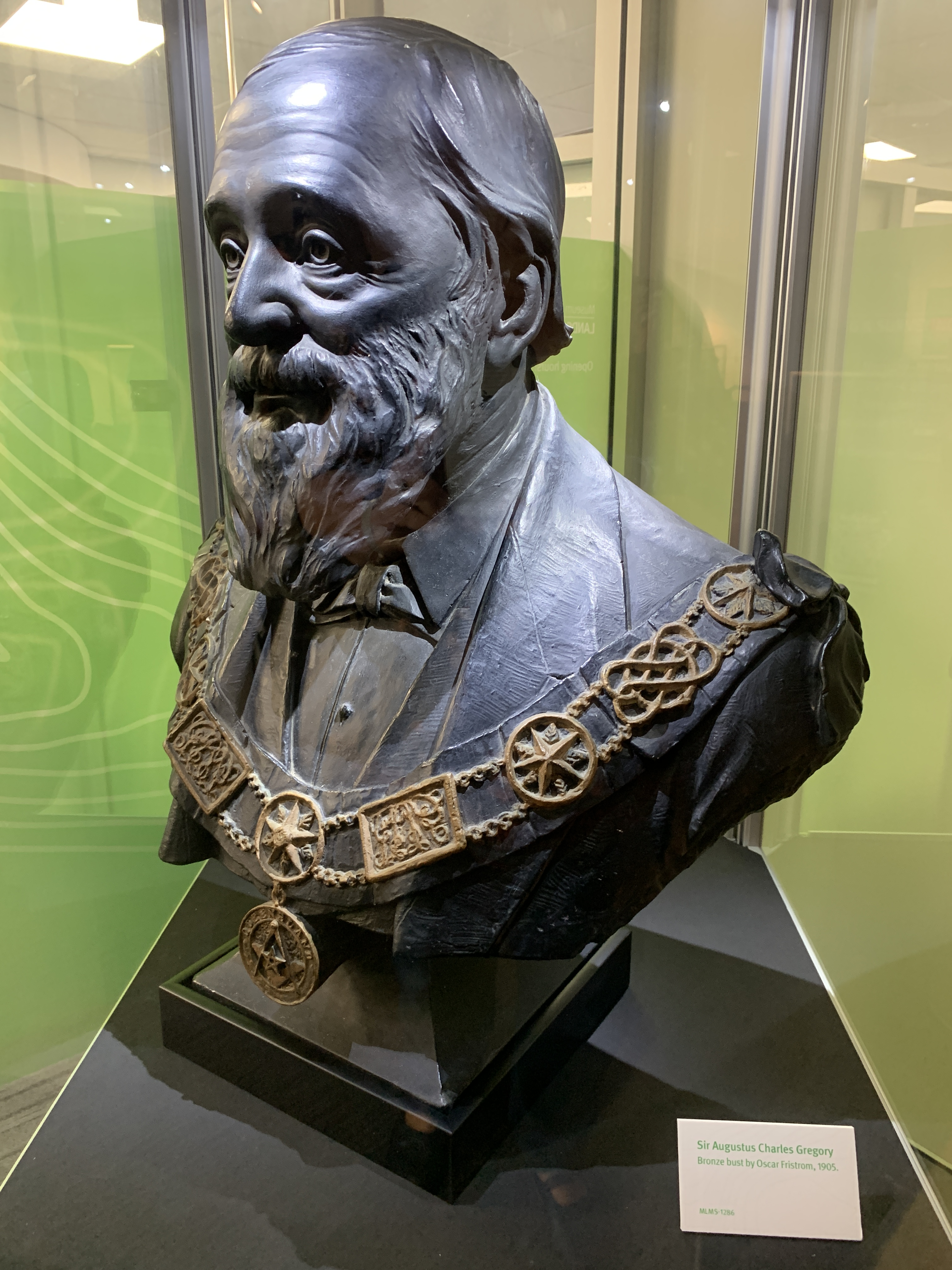
The bust of Augustus Charles Gregory sculpted by Oscar Fristrom in 1905 stands at the entrance to the museum, 2020

In 1982, the Queensland Government through the Surveyor General of Queensland, JM Serisier ordered that a mapping and surveying museum be set up in order to preserve the mapping and surveying history of Queensland. The original museum was established in the Lands Administration Building, (now the Conrad Treasury Hotel), and Bill Kitson was tasked with establishing and operating the museum.

With the support of the department and the mapping and surveying industry Kitson set about collecting artefacts, which were rapidly disappearing as technology overtook the traditional means of creating maps and surveys. The museum's collection grew from simply holding artefacts to include diaries, artwork, photographs and biographies which captured the personal and social history of those involved in surveying and mapping. Many historical maps of Queensland were also acquired.

In 1987, the museum moved to the newly constructed Landcentre building in Woolloongabba.

In 1988, in order to preserve the artefacts that had been collected an agreement was signed with the Queensland Museum to become custodian of the collections whilst the government provides staff to manage and run the museum.

In 1991, the focus of the museum was broadened and it was renamed the Museum of Lands, Mapping and Surveying to include history of land development in Queensland.

In 2018, the museum relocated to 317 Edward Street in the Brisbane CBD.

In late 1905 Brisbane article Oscar Fristrom sculpted a bust of Augustus Charles Gregory, the first Surveyor-General of Queensland. In February 1906, Fristrom offered to sell the bust to the Royal Geographical Society of Queensland but the society decided not to buy it; however, they did display it at an event in June 1906. For many years the bust was displayed at Freemasons’ Gregory Lodge in Cairns (Gregory being depicted wearing his Masonic regalia). In 2018, the Freemasons donated the bust to the museum. As at 10 March 2020, the bust is at the entrance of the museum.

== See also ==
- Surveying in Australia
