= Clas Edvard Friström =

Artist and art teacher

- Born: 23 January 1864; Torhamn, Blekinge County, Sweden
- Died: 27 March 1950 (aged 86); San Anselmo, California, United States
- Occupations: Artist, art teacher

Clas Edvard Friström (23 January 1864 – 27 March 1950), also known as Claes Edward Fristrom (23 January 1864 – 27 March 1950), was an artist and art teacher professionally active in Australia, New Zealand, and the United States.

Friström was born near Karlskrona in the parish of Torhamn, Blekinge County, Sweden, on 23 January 1864.

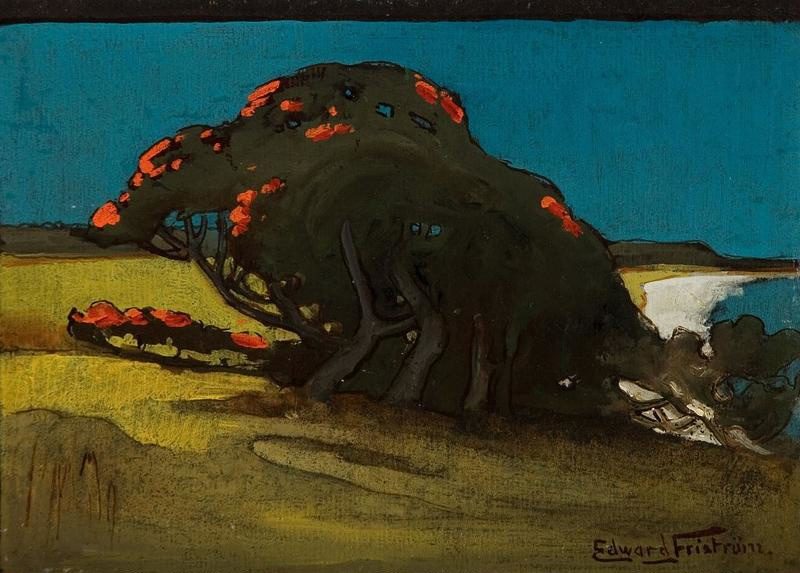
Pohutukawa by Edward Friström

Sometime in the mid-1880s this essentially self-taught artist moved to Brisbane, Australia, where he was known as Edward Friström. His brother, Oscar Friström, was a recognized photographer and helped to establish the Royal Queensland Art Society, where both of the brothers exhibited. Edward married Margaret Johnston of South Brisbane in July 1886; they had three children. In 1903 they moved to Auckland, New Zealand, where he taught at the Elam School of Fine Arts and exhibited with the Auckland Society of Artists.

In 1915 Edward and Margaret immigrated to California to join a son and daughter; initially they resided in the San Francisco Bay Area. According to the United States Census of 1920, he and his wife had moved to Monterey, California, and neither had become naturalized citizens. Fristrom listed his occupation as "artist, portrait painting." By 1926 the couple had purchased a home and studio in nearby Carmel-by-the-Sea, which was at that time the largest art colony on the American West Coast. Between 1927 and 1936 he was a frequent and popular exhibitor at the Carmel Art Association, where his seascapes and landscapes received much acclaim. His work was displayed at other local venues, including the Monterey County Fair. In the late 1930s the Fristroms moved to San Anselmo, California, a community north of San Francisco. He was a co-founder of the San Francisco chapter of the reactionary Society for Sanity in Art and exhibited with that organization between 1939 and 1947. At the Society's 1943 Fifth Annual Exhibition in the California Palace of the Legion of Honor his canvas Sonoma Valley received an Honorable Mention. Fristrom died on 27 March 1950, aged 86, in San Anselmo.
