= Wakaya people =

Aboriginal Australians of Northern Territory

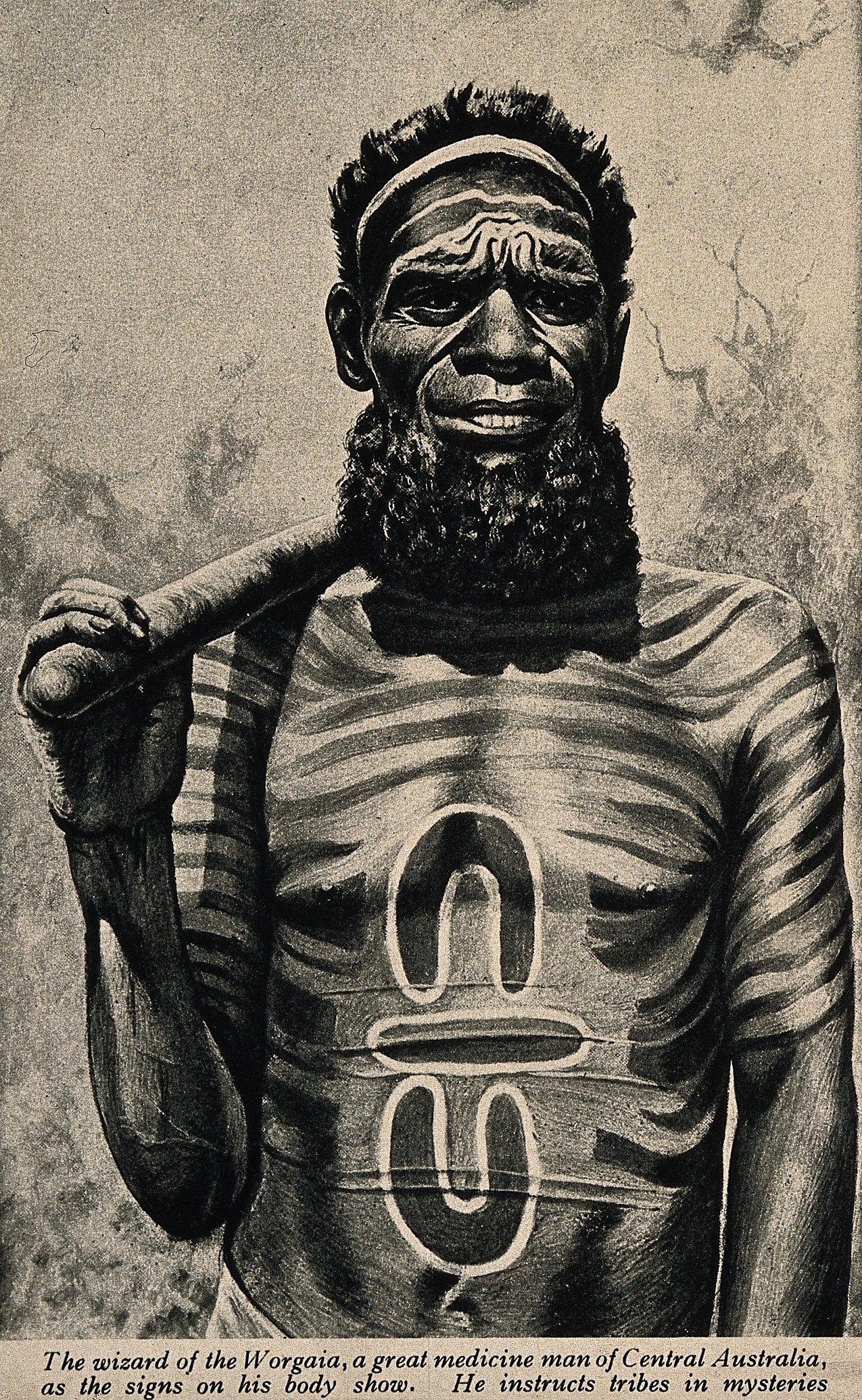
A Wakaya man

The Wakaya are an Aboriginal Australian people of the Northern Territory.

== Country ==
Norman Tindale's estimate of the Wakaya's territory assigns them some 15,000 square miles (39,000 km^{2}).

== Language ==
The Wakaya language is now extinct.

== Social economy ==
The Wakaya were one of the Australian peoples, the others being the Watjarri, Wanman, Pitjantjatjara, Ngadadjara and Alyawarre, who are known to have harvested purslane seeds, and threshed them within stone circles for the oily nutrients they provided.

== Land ==
In 1980 the Wakaya people lodged a land claim along with the Alyawarre people for land somewhere near the remote outstation of Purrukwarra. As a result, they were handed back 1,874 square kilometres (724 sq mi) on 22 October 1992, while the Alyawarre were given 2,065 square kilometres (797 sq mi), both of which were only small parts of the original claim.

== Alternative names ==
- Wagaja, Waggaia
- Wagai, Waagai
- Wagaiau, Waagi
- Warkya
- Wogaia, Worgaia, Worgai, Workaia, Warkaia
- Workia, Workii, Woorkia
- Lee-wakya
- Akaja ( Kaytetye exonym)
- Ukkia, Arkiya

== Notable Wakaya people ==
A notable Wakaya man was Kudajarnd who, alongside his wives Langinkab and Kulindab, in the Wild Australia Show in the 1890s.

== Sources ==
- Tindale, Norman Barnett (1974). "Wakaja (NT)". Aboriginal Tribes of Australia: Their Terrain, Environmental Controls, Distribution, Limits, and Proper Names. Australian National University Press. ISBN 978-0-708-10741-6.
