= Archibald Meston =

Australian politician (1851–1924)

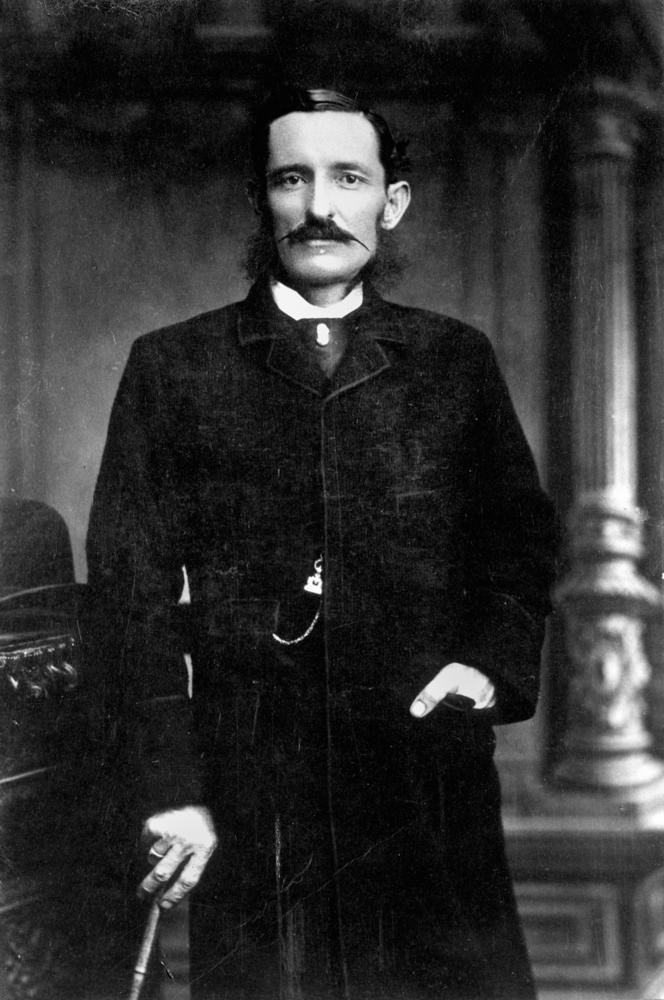
- c. 1895

Member of the Queensland Legislative Assembly for Rosewood
- In office 26 November 1878 – 4 July 1882
- Preceded by: New seat
- Succeeded by: Jean Isambert

Personal details
- Born: Archibald Meston; 26 March 1851 Towie, Aberdeenshire, Scotland
- Died: 11 March 1924 (aged 72) South Brisbane, Queensland, Australia
- Resting place: South Brisbane Cemetery
- Spouse: Margaret Frances Prowse Shaw
- Occupation: Civil servant, Journalist, Naturalist, Explorer

Archibald Meston (26 March 1851 – 11 March 1924) was an Australian politician, civil servant, journalist, naturalist and explorer.

== Personal life ==
Archibald Meston was born at Towie, Aberdeenshire, Scotland, the son of Alexander Meston.

Meston migrated with his parents to Sydney in 1859, his family subsequently taking up farming at Ulmarra, New South Wales on the Clarence River.

Meston married Margaret Frances Prowse Shaw in Sydney on 22 August 1871.

After a long and varied career, Meston retired to Brisbane where he died (a pauper) of tetanus on 11 March 1924. Meston was survived by his wife and, out of seven children, by four sons and a daughter. He is buried in South Brisbane Cemetery.

== Professional and public life ==
In 1874, after travelling from New South Wales, he managed Dr John Waugh's Pearlwell sugar plantation on the Brisbane River. The site is east of Oxley Creek, where it flows into the Brisbane River.

From 1875 to 1881 he was editor of the Ipswich Observer. He was later the editor of The Toowoomba Chronicle.

From 1878 to 1882 he represented Rosewood in the Legislative Assembly of Queensland, where he was a strong supporter of Queensland Premier Thomas McIlwraith.

He lost his seat when a civil court case resulted in bankruptcy.

In 1881 he moved to Far North Queensland where he edited the Townsville Herald for a short time before moving to Cairns where he was editor of The Cairns Post and lived on the Barron River until 1889.

Although he claimed to be interested in sugar-growing, he never actually did so, and made his living from journalism, speculation and property management.

In January 1889 Meston led a government expedition to the Bellenden Ker Range and explored its summit. The expedition was considered a success, and this led to further official engagements.

In 1891 he persuaded a stock and commission agent named Brabazon Purcell to recruit Aboriginal men and women to perform in the Wild Australia Show; one of whom was Kudajarnd. They rehearsed in Brisbane before performances in Brisbane, Sydney and Melbourne. The show collapsed in Melbourne.

In 1894 he was commissioned to investigate the conditions of Aboriginal Australians in Queensland; despite his consequent proposals, only some of his ideas were embodied in the Aboriginals Protection and Restriction of the Sale of Opium Act 1897. Meston was, from 1898 to 1903, the Southern Protector of Aboriginals for Queensland. During his time as the Protector, Meston visited many Aboriginal communities and camps across Queensland and as an amateur ethnologist and linguist he documented Aboriginal culture and language. Meston collected words and wordlists from sites across Queensland which were later collated into various notebooks and cuttings. These notebooks are now held by the State Library of Queensland are a valuable resource for those researching Indigenous Language. In 1903 Meston was told that his services were no longer required.

In 1910 he was appointed director of the Queensland Government Tourist Bureau in Sydney.

Throughout his life he was a prolific writer and, in addition to the newspapers he edited, he published frequently in The Queenslander, The Brisbane Courier and many other papers.

== Commemorations ==
Archibald Meston is commemorated in the names of two plants collected by him on Bellenden Ker, Garcinia mestonii and Piper mestonii.

In 1936, a portrait of Archibald Meston, painted by artist and friend B.E. Minns, was purchased through public subscription and donated to the Queensland National Art Gallery (now the Queensland Art Gallery).

Meston Street in Mitchelton, Brisbane was named after him in 1938.

== Publications ==
Apart from numerous writings as a journalist, as well as official reports to government authorities, several books were published by Meston:

- 1890 – Queensland Railway and Tourist Guide. Queensland Railway Commissioners: Brisbane.
- 1895 – Geographic History of Queensland. Dedicated to the Queensland People. Queensland Government: Brisbane.

Parliament of Queensland
New seat	Member for Rosewood; 1878–1882	Succeeded by Jean Isambert
