= Oscar Fristrom =

Swedish-born painter

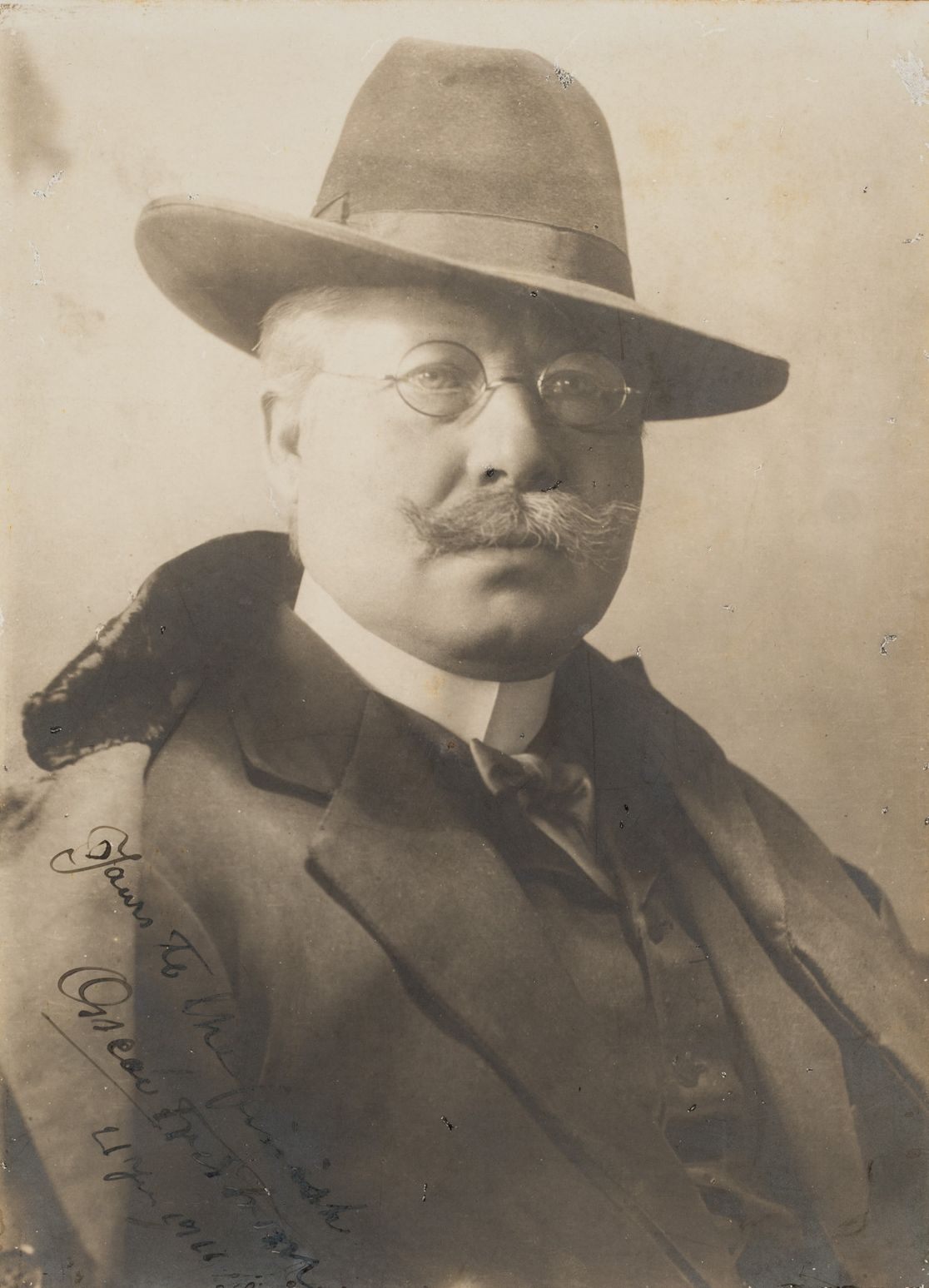
- Photograph of Fristrom, c. 1911
- Born: Carl Magnus Oscar Friström; 16 January 1856; Sturkö, Blekinge, Sweden
- Died: 26 June 1918 (aged 62); Queensland, Australia

Carl Magnus Oscar Friström (16 January 1856 – 26 June 1918), generally known as Oscar Fristrom, was a portrait painter and art teacher born in Sweden, who had a substantial career in Queensland and South Australia, and was best known for his depictions of Aboriginal Australians.

== History ==
Fristrom was born a son of Claus August Friström of Sturkö, Blekinge in Sweden. He arrived in Brisbane, Australia in 1883. By 1885 Oscar was employed at D. H. Hutchison's Elite Photo Co., where he was responsible for the colouring and over-painting of photographic portraits, which was much in vogue at the time.

In 1884 Fristrom exhibited in the fine arts section of the annual Queensland National Association Exhibition, and by the late 1880s he was one of the few professional artists in Brisbane. He was also one of the first artists to create portraits of Aboriginal people, created through the technique of over-painting photographs.

He was largely self-taught, but his second oil painting was of sufficient merit to be shown at the 1886 Brisbane Exhibition.

He was, with L. W. K. Wirth, James Laurence Watts, and Walter Jenner, in 1888 a founding member of the Queensland Art Society. This led to R. Godfrey Rivers working for the foundation of the Queensland National Art Gallery.

He left for Adelaide in September 1893, where he found employment with Fritz & Co. photographic studio, and in November was accepted as a member of the Adelaide Easel Club. While in Adelaide, Fristrom painted and sketched portraits of well-known Adelaide identity, Aboriginal man Poltpalingada Booboorowie. In August 1894 an exhibition of oil portraits by Fristrom was mounted at the "Easel Clubroom" at Fritz and Bernard's Art Palace, 62 Rundle Street in Adelaide.

He returned to Brisbane in September 1894.

The Society of Artists went into decline around 1901. In 1904 a new Society of Artists was formed; meetings were held in Fristrom's studio in "Oakden Chambers", Queen Street. Fristrom was its president at the time of his death, as well as a member of the advisory board of the Queensland National Art Gallery.

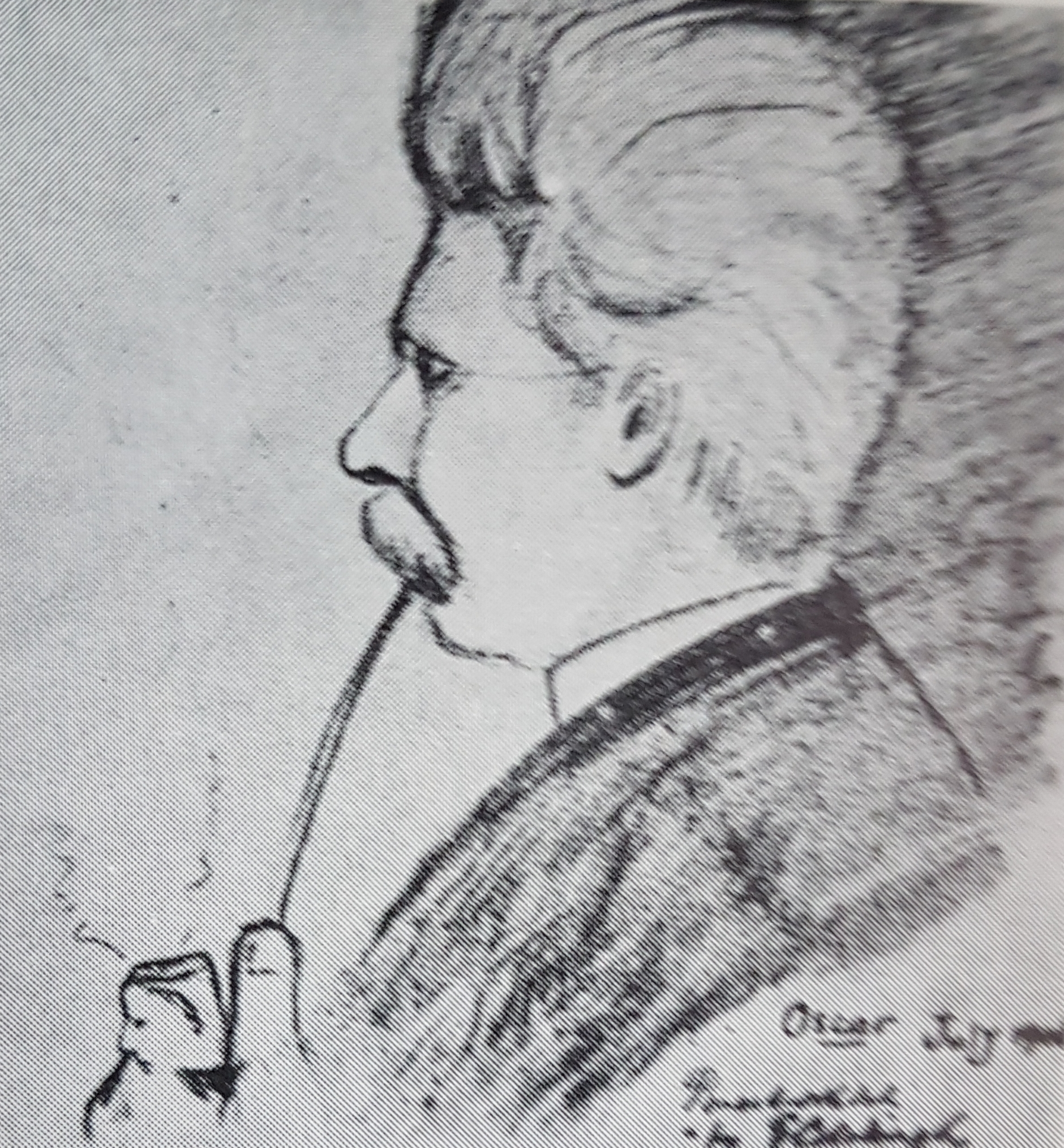
Sketch of Oscar Friström

== Family ==
Oscar married Caroline Rooke (1865 – 17 July 1948) of Breakfast Creek, Queensland; in 1911 they settled at Mooloolah, Queensland, later moved to Caloundra, then 52 Wharf Street, Brisbane. She was well known as a musician and music teacher. They had two children:

- Carl (25 March 1886 – ) married Ruby May Rooke (his cousin?) on 20 August 1921.
- Alma Christina (6 July 1889 – 2 December 1943) married Samuel Burgess; they lived at Caloundra.

Oscar had a brother Edward Friström, also an artist in Brisbane, and from 1903 in New Zealand. He married Margaret Johnston of South Brisbane in July 1886; they had a daughter Olivia, a promising pianist, and a son. Another brother, Tage Edward Friström, a member of the US Voluntary Infantry, was killed in 1898 fighting Spain in Manila.

Fristrom died at 3am on 26 June 1918. He had been suffering from cancer for many months. His obituary in the Brisbane Telegraph called him "one of the best portrait painters in Australia". His funeral moved from the funeral parlour of John Hislop & Sons to the South Brisbane Cemetery, where he was buried with Anglican rites.

== Notable works ==
In 1905 Fristrom sculpted a bust of Augustus Charles Gregory, an explorer and first Surveyor-General of Queensland. In February 1906, Fristrom offered to sell the bust to the Royal Geographical Society of Queensland but the society decided not to buy it; however, they did display it at an event in June 1906. For many years the bust was displayed at Freemasons’ Gregory Lodge in Cairns (Gregory being depicted wearing his Masonic regalia). In 2018, the Freemasons donated the bust to the Museum of Lands, Mapping and Surveying in Brisbane. As at 10 March 2020, the bust is at the entrance of the museum.

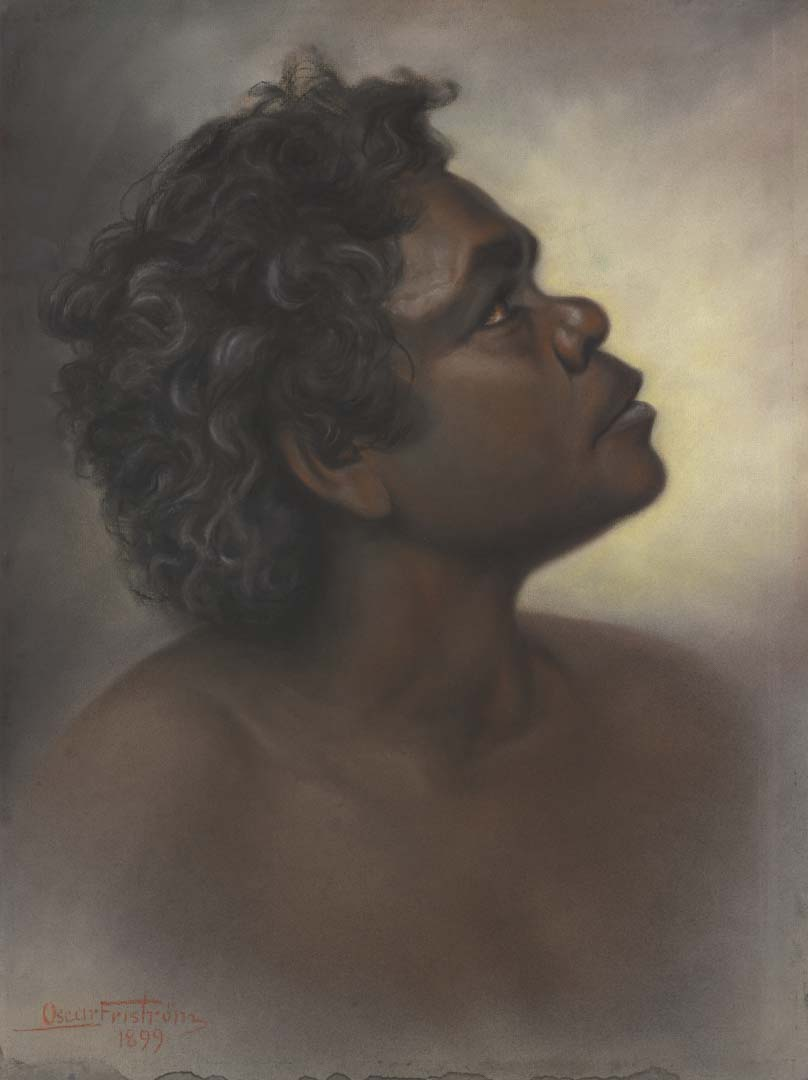
Head of an Aboriginal woman (1899); The subject's name is Sarah

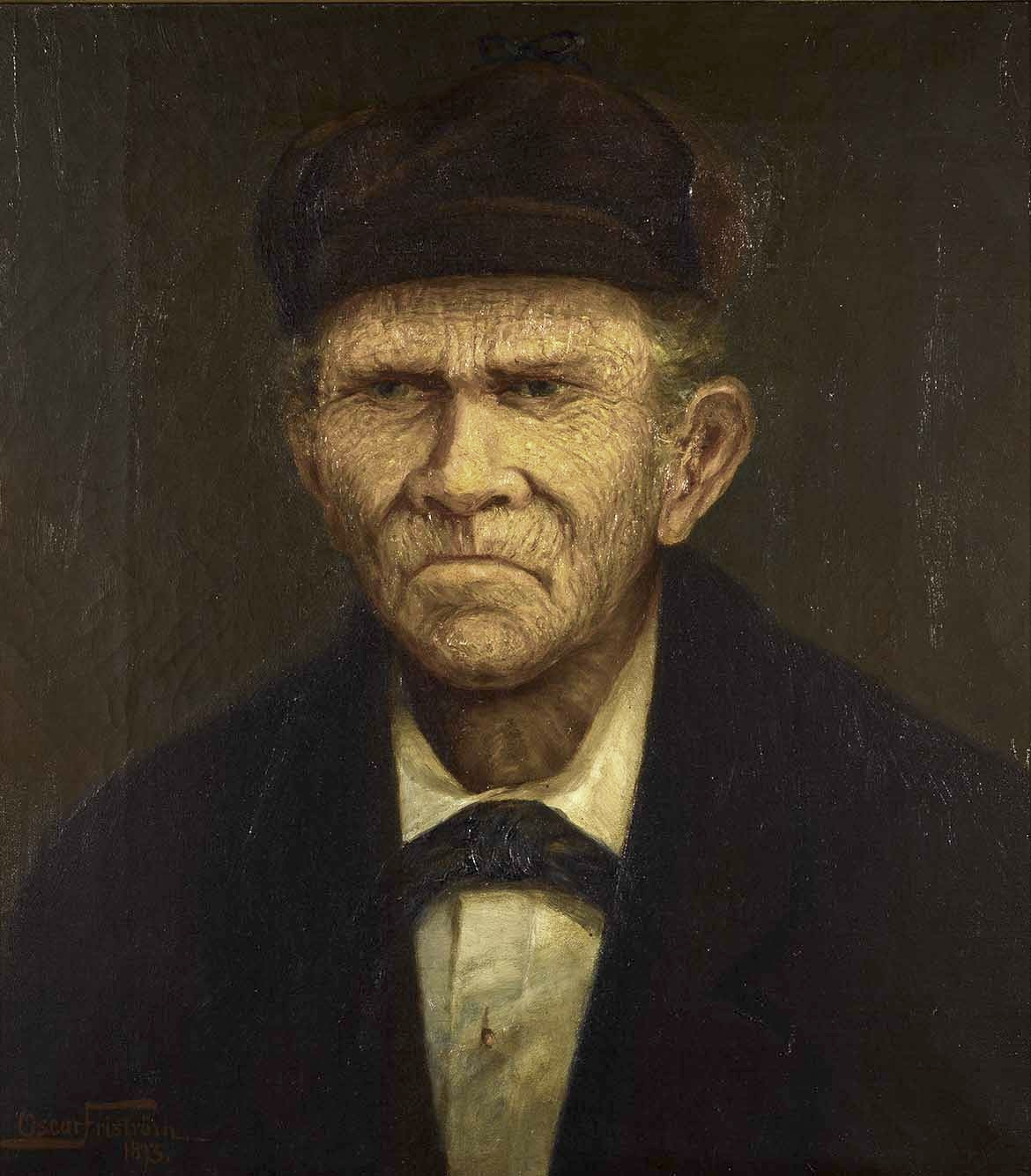
Duramboi (1893), a portrait of James Davis

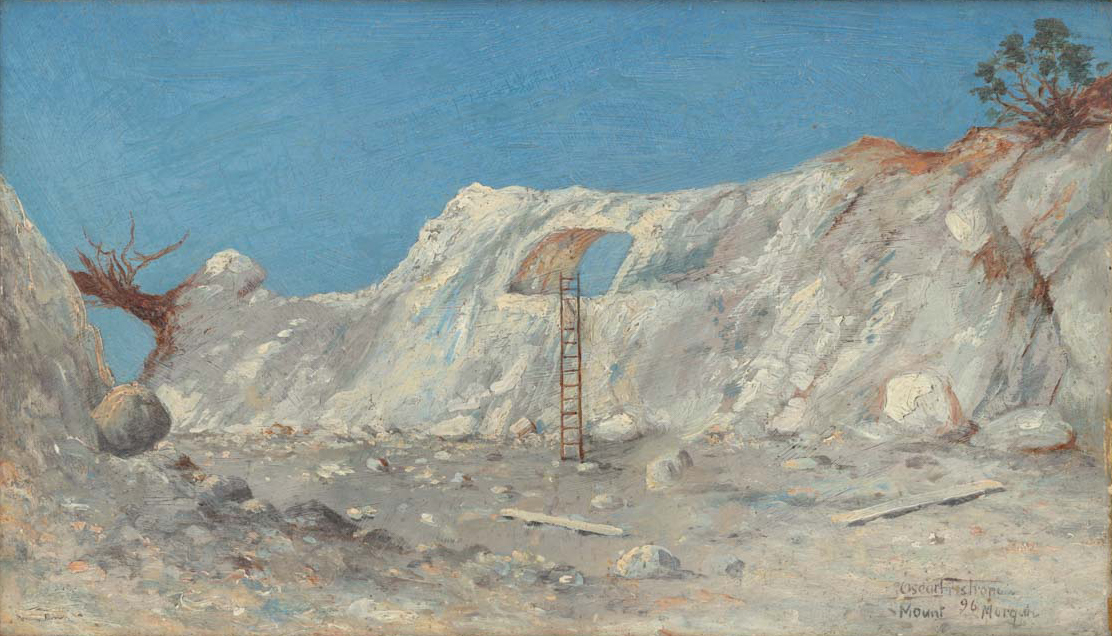
Mount Morgan (1896)

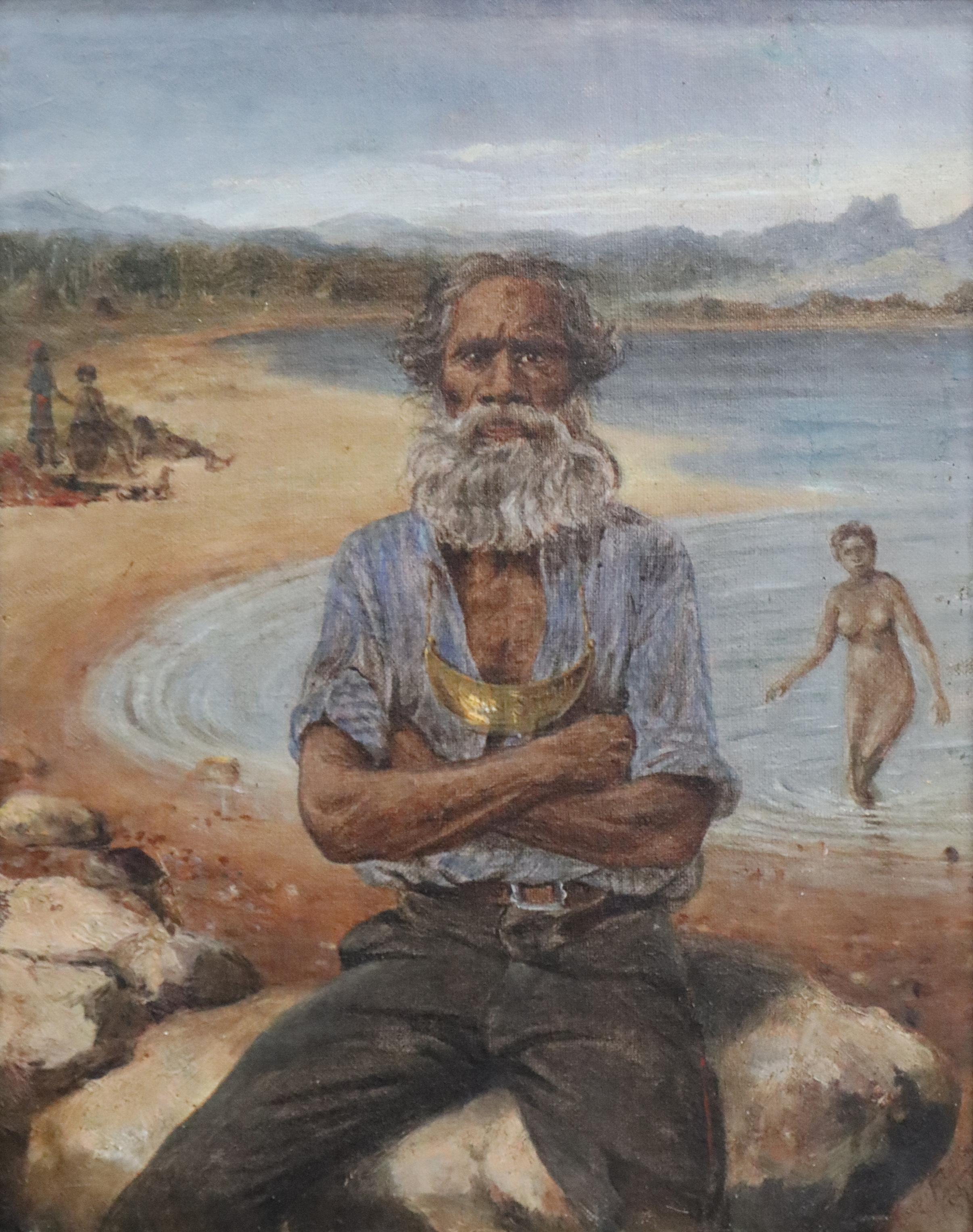
1899 portrait of Kerwalli

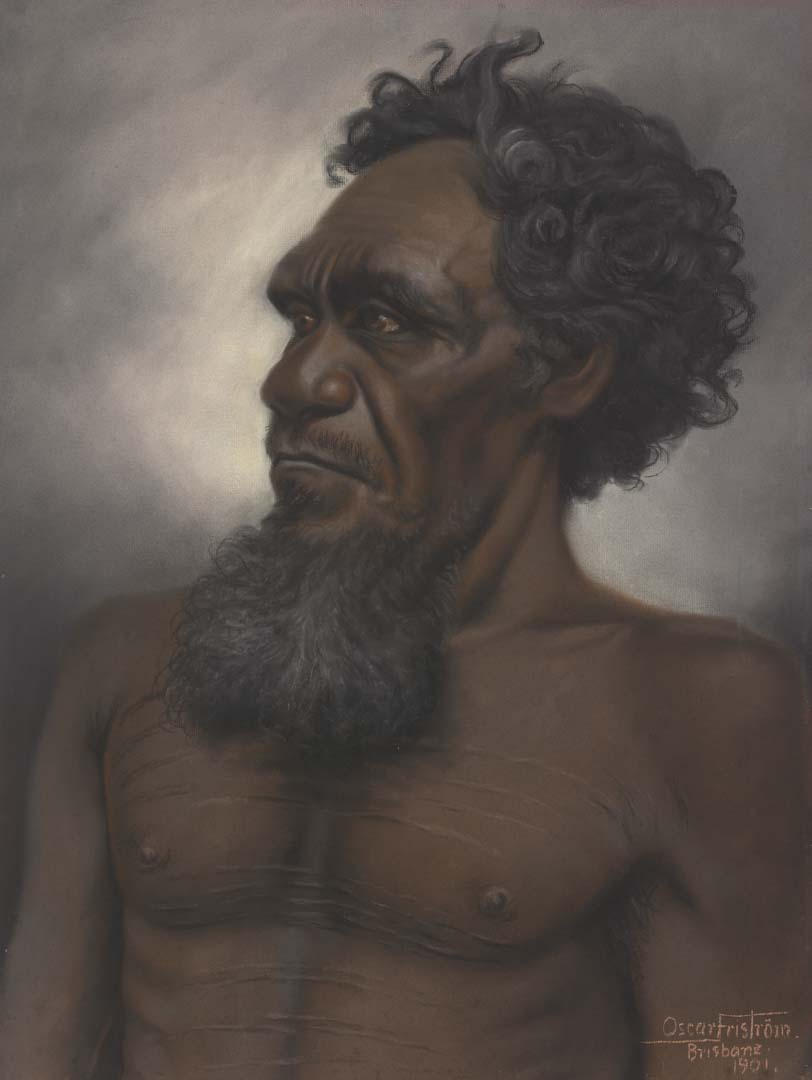
Coontajandra (1901)

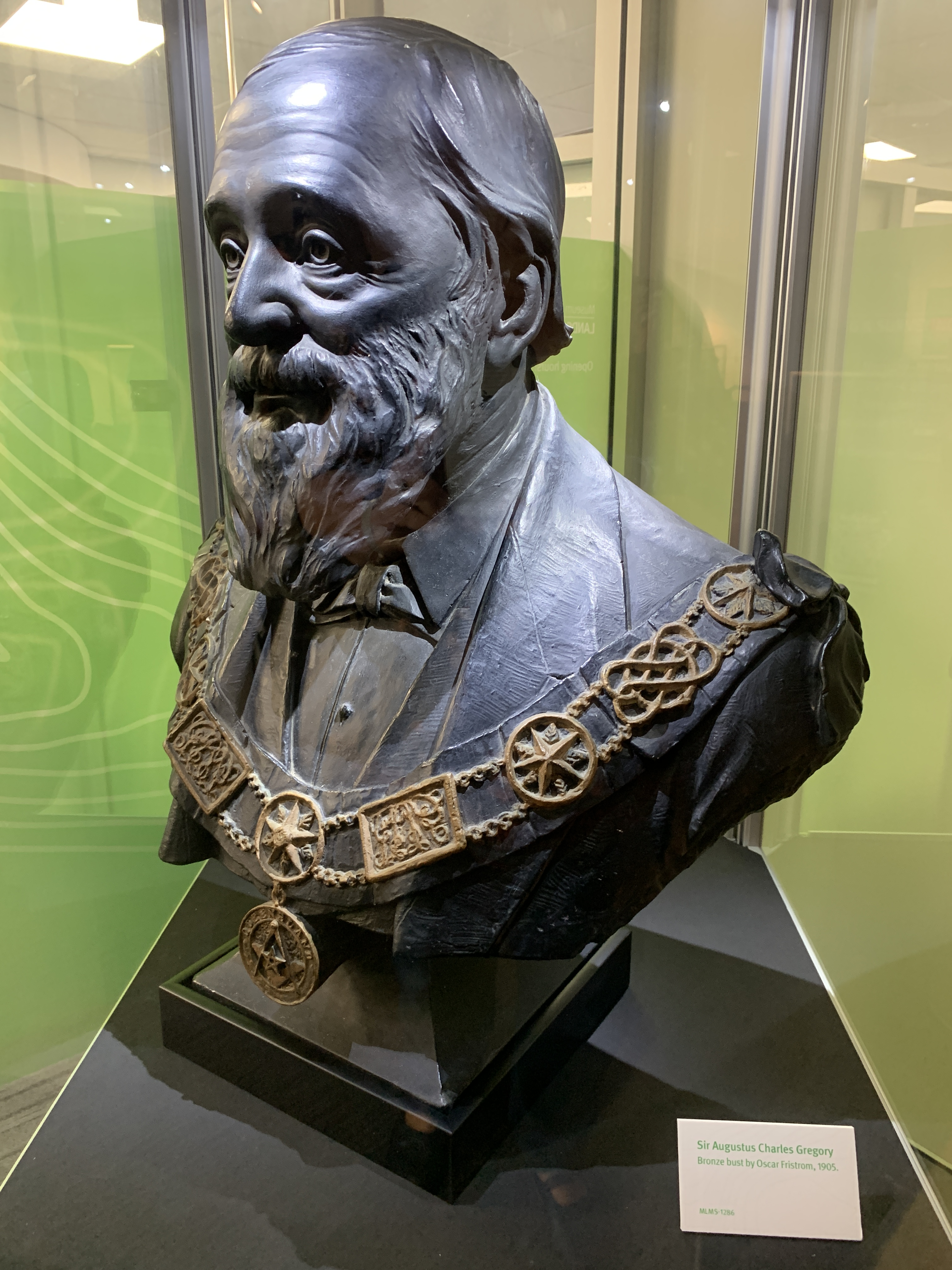
Bust of Augustus Charles Gregory sculpted in 1905
