= Shire of Caboolture =

Local government area in Queensland

Coordinates: 27°04′59″S 152°57′04″E

- Local government area
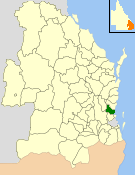
- Location within Queensland

- Country: Australia
- State: Queensland
- Region: South East Queensland
- Established: 1879
- Abolished: 2008
- Council seat: Caboolture

Area
  - Total: 1,224.4 km^{2} (472.7 sq mi)

Population
  - Total: 132,473 (2006 census)
  - Density: 108.194/km^{2} (280.222/sq mi)
- Website: Shire of Caboolture
LGAs around Shire of Caboolture
Caloundra	Caloundra	Pacific Ocean
Kilcoy	Shire of Caboolture	Moreton Bay
Esk	Pine Rivers	Pine Rivers

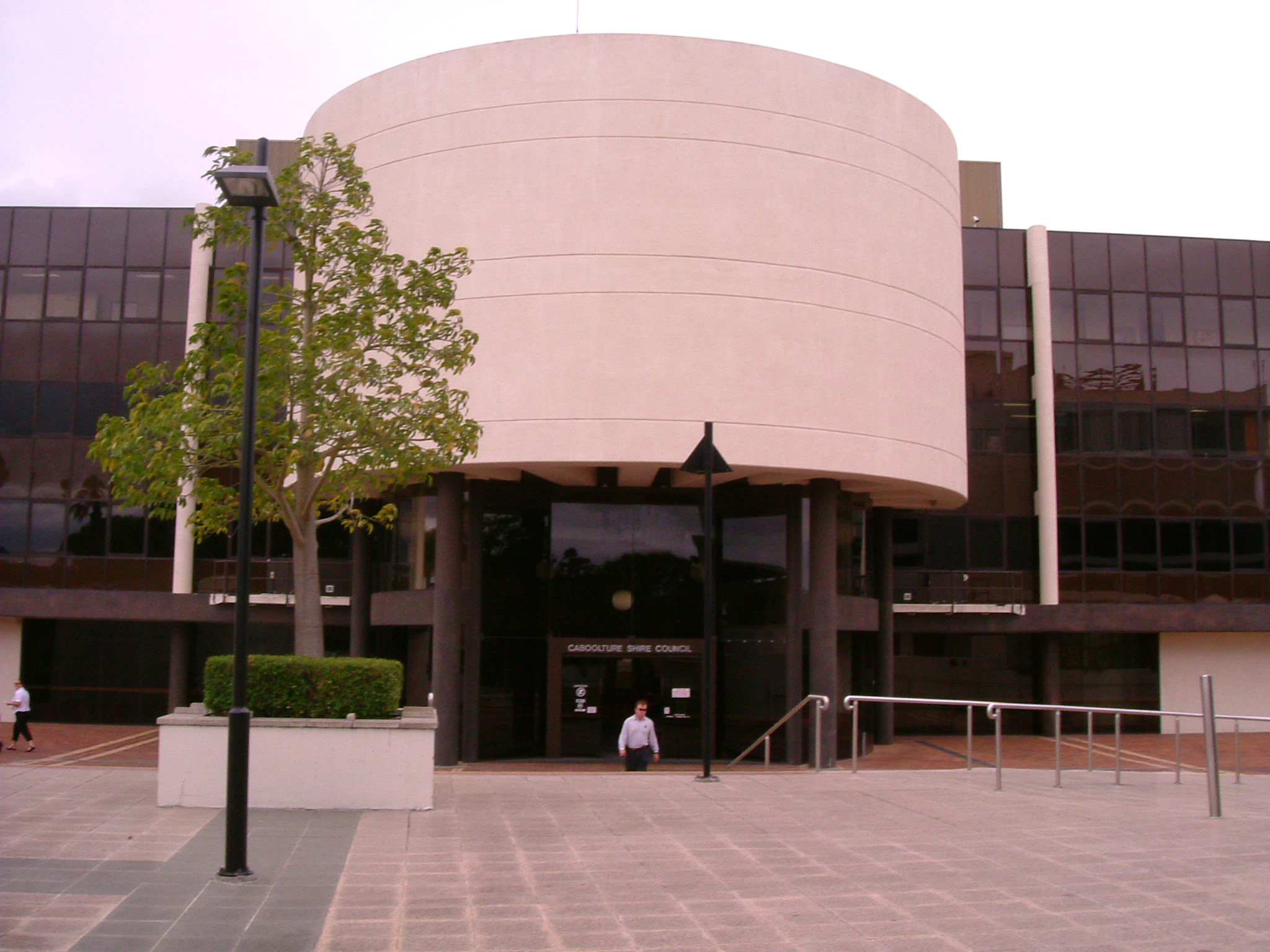
Caboolture Shire Council chambers

The Shire of Caboolture was a local government area located in the Australian state of Queensland on the northern urban fringe of the capital, Brisbane, and south of the Sunshine Coast. The Shire covered an area of 1,224.4 square kilometres (472.7 sq mi), of which approximately one-quarter was urban, and existed as a local government entity from 1879 until 2008, when it amalgamated with the City of Redcliffe and Shire of Pine Rivers to form the Moreton Bay Region, which was renamed the City of Moreton Bay in July 2023.

== History ==
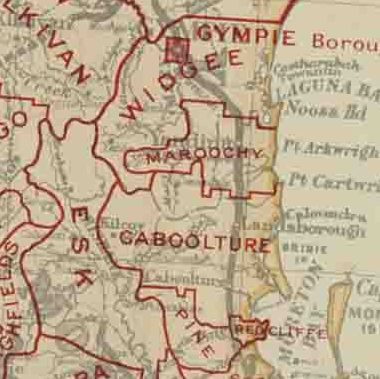
Map of Caboolture Division and adjacent local government areas, March 1902

Caboolture Division was created on 11 November 1879 as one of 74 divisions around Queensland under the Divisional Boards Act 1879. It was centred on Caboolture, which was at that time a small logging town, and initially covered all of Moreton Bay and much of the Sunshine Coast, but by 1890 had shrunk considerably with the separate incorporation of the Pine Division (21 January 1888), Redcliffe Division (5 April 1888) and Maroochy Division (5 July 1890).

Caboolture Division became the Shire of Caboolture on 31 March 1903 after the Local Authorities Act 1902 was enacted.

On 15 March 2008, under the Local Government (Reform Implementation) Act 2007 passed by the Parliament of Queensland on 10 August 2007, the Shire of Caboolture merged with the City of Redcliffe and the Shire of Pine Rivers to form the Moreton Bay Region, which was renamed City of Moreton Bay in July 2023.

== Suburbs and towns ==
The Shire of Caboolture included the following suburbs:

Coastal Caboolture region:

- Beachmere
- Bellmere
- Burpengary
- Burpengary East
- Caboolture
- Caboolture South
- Deception Bay
- Donnybrook
- Elimbah
- Godwin Beach
- Meldale
- Moodlu
- Morayfield
- Narangba
- Ningi
- Sandstone Point
- Toorbul
- Upper Caboolture

Inland Caboolture region:

- Bellthorpe
- Booroobin
- Bracalba
- Campbells Pocket
- Cedarton
- Commissioners Flat
- D'Aguilar
- Delaneys Creek
- Moorina
- Mount Delaney
- Mount Mee
- Neurum
- Rocksberg
- Stanmore
- Stony Creek
- Wamuran
- Wamuran Basin
- Woodford

Bribie Island:

- Banksia Beach
- Bellara
- Bongaree
- Bribie Island NP
- Welsby
- White Patch
- Woorim

== Population ==
Year	Population	% Annual growth
1933	5,316	
1947	5,716	
1954	7,101	3.15
1961	8,877	3.24
1966	10,149	2.71
1971	12,207	3.76
1976	19,404	9.71
1981	32,644	10.96
1986	47,494	7.79
1991	70,052	8.08
1996	98,859	7.13
2001	112,458	2.61
2006	132,473	3.33

== Chairmen and mayors ==
- 1881: William Pettigrew
- 1927: Anders Anderson Fredin
- 1991–1994: Patricia Rhoda (Pat) Camilleri
- 2000–2008: Joy Leishman
