= Bribie Island (disambiguation) =

Bribie Island may refer to:

- Bribie Island, an island in Moreton Bay, Queensland, Australia
  - Bribie Island National Park, a national park on Bribie Island
  - Bribie Island Coaches, a bus operator on Bribie Island
  - Bribie Island Seaside Museum, a museum on Bribie Island
  - Bribie Island Second World War Fortifications, a heritage-listed military installations on Bribie Island
  - Bribie Island State High School, a secondary school on Bribie Island
