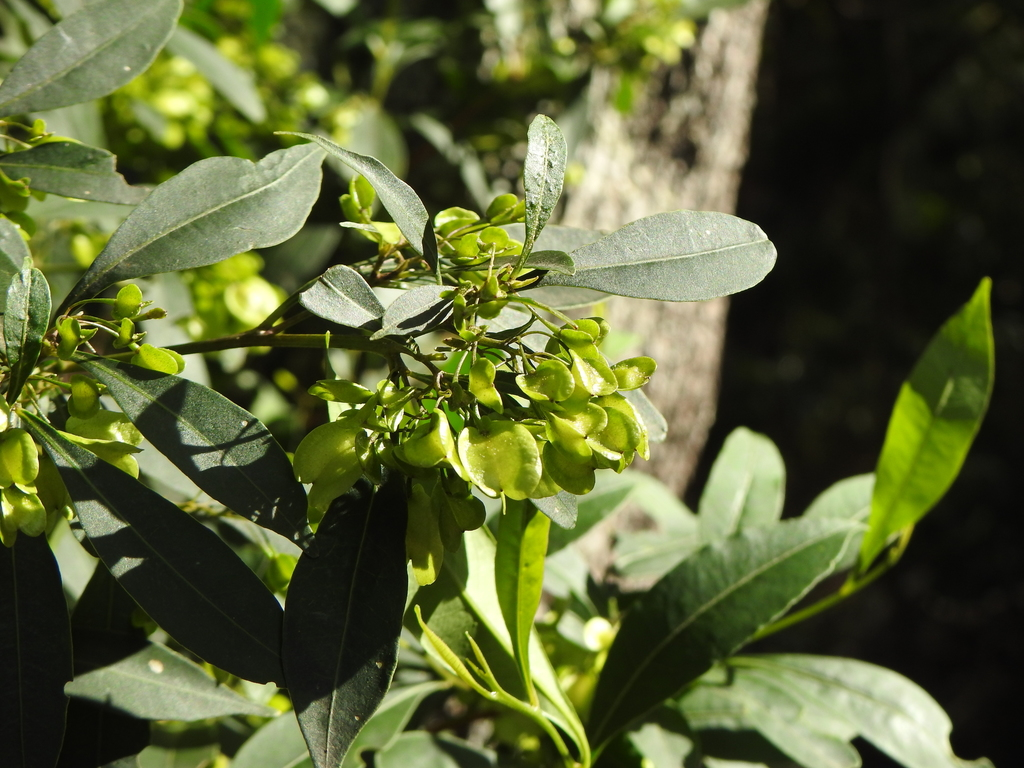
- Near White Patch on Bribie Island

Scientific classification
- Kingdom: Plantae
- Clade: Tracheophytes
- Clade: Angiosperms
- Clade: Eudicots
- Clade: Rosids
- Order: Sapindales
- Family: Sapindaceae
- Genus: Dodonaea
- Species: D. triquetra

Binomial name
- Dodonaea triquetra J.C.Wendl.

= Dodonaea triquetra =

Species of shrub

Dodonaea triquetra, commonly known as large-leaf hop-bush, is a species of flowering plant in the family Sapindaceae and is endemic to eastern Australia. It is usually a dioecious shrub with simple elliptic, sometimes lance-shaped or egg-shaped leaves, flowers in panicles on the ends of branches, each flower usually with four sepals, eight stamens, and a three-winged capsule.

== Description ==
Dodonaea triquetra is a dioecious or rarely polygamodioecious shrub that typically grows to a height of up to 3 m (9.8 ft). It has simple, elliptic, sometimes lance-shaped or egg-shaped leaves 45–120 mm (1.8–4.7 in) long, 10–47 mm (0.39–1.85 in) wide and glabrous on a petiole 2–7 mm (0.079–0.276 in) long. The flowers are arranged in panicles on the ends of branches, each flower with four, rarely five broadly triangular sepals but that fall off as the flower develops, usually eight, rarely ten stamens, and a glabrous ovary. Flowering mostly occurs in summer and the seed is lens-shaped, 2.5–2.7 mm (0.098–0.106 in) long.

== Taxonomy ==
Dodonaea triquetra was first formally described in 1798 by Johann Christoph Wendland in his Botanische Beobachtungen: nebst einigen neuen Gattungen und Arten.

== Distribution and habitat ==
Large-leaf hop-bush grows in wet or dry forest, usually in sand or on sandstone on the east coast of Australia from north of Cooktown in north Queensland through near-coastal areas, the slopes and tablelands of New South Wales, to near Bairnsdale in eastern Victoria.
