= Welsby, Queensland =

Welsby Bribie Island, Queensland
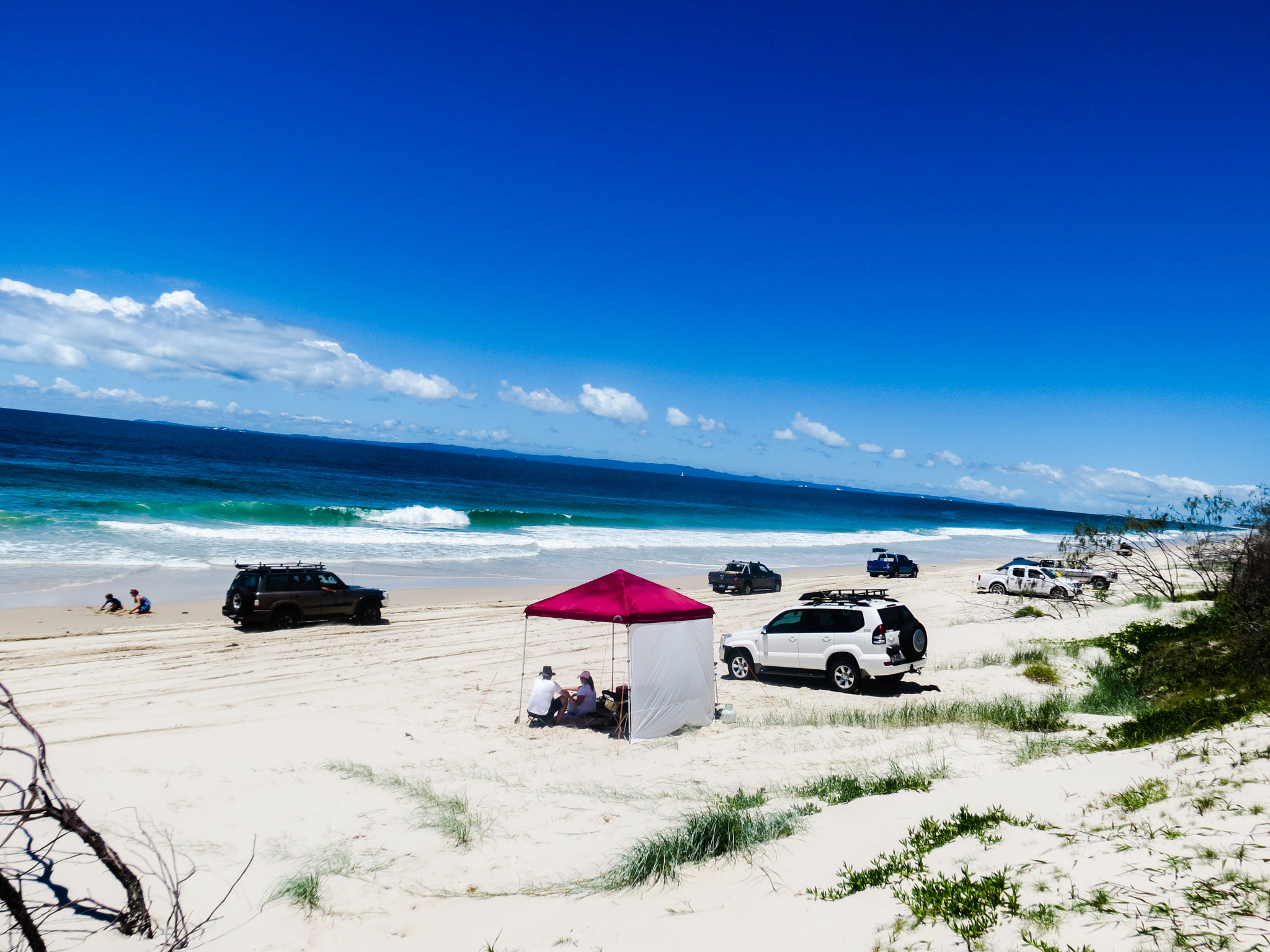
- Off roading on eastern side of Welsby with Moreton Island on the horizon

- Coordinates: 26.9866°S 153.1236°E
- Population: 0 (2021 census)
  - Density: 0.000/km^{2} (0.000/sq mi)
- Postcode(s): 4507
- Area: 68.0 km^{2} (26.3 sq mi)
- Time zone: AEST (UTC+10:00)
- Location: 14.3 km (9 mi) NNW of Bongaree; 35 km (22 mi) NW of Caboolture; 78.6 km (49 mi) NNE of Brisbane CBD
- LGA(s): City of Moreton Bay
- State electorate(s): Glass House
- Federal division(s): Longman
Suburbs around Welsby:
Beerburrum	Bribie Island North	Coral Sea
Donnybrook; Meldale	Welsby	Coral Sea
Toorbul	White Patch; Banksia Beach	Woorim

Welsby is a coastal locality on Bribie Island in the City of Moreton Bay, Queensland, Australia. In the 2021 census, Welsby had "no people or a very low population".

== Geography ==
Welsby is the central part of Bribie Island. The Pumicestone Channel (also known as Pumicestone Passage) is its western coastal border and the Coral Sea is its eastern coastal border. Almost all of Welsby is within the Bribie Island National Park or the Bribie Island State Forest. Apart from these protected areas, the remaining land is a very narrow strip along the west coast beside the Pumicestone Channel.

Welsby has the following points:

- Gallagher Point (27.0140°S 153.0993°E)
- Mission Point (26.9792°S 153.0772°E)
- Offshore are the following marine passages:

Welsby has the following passages:

- Gallagher Gutter (27.0245°S 153.1112°E) close to the western shore extending into White Patch to the south
- Pumicestone Channel (26.9463°S 153.0751°E) further offshore on the western side extending from Moreton Bay at Bongaree on the south-westernmost part of Bribie Island through Welsby to the very northernmost tip of Bribie Island (Bribie Island North) where it connects to the Coral Sea at Caloundra
- Skirmish Passage (26.9793°S 153.1675°E) close to the eastern shore extending from Bribie Island North through Welsby and south to Woorim (the most south-eastern part of Bribie Island)
- North West Channel (26.9205°S 153.1939°E) further off the eastern shore extending from Kings Beach at Caloundra, past Bribie Island North and Welsby, to Woorim

Poverty Creek flows into the Pumicestone Channel (26.9908°S 153.0931°E).

There are two lagoons on the eastern shore of the locality:

- Mermaid Lagoon (27.0028°S 153.1667°E)
- Welsby Lagoon (26.9637°S 153.1532°E)

== History ==
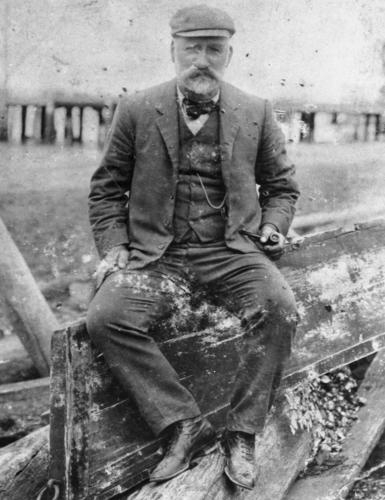
Thomas Welsby, sitting by the sea

The locality is named for Thomas Welsby, a Queensland politician who enjoyed yachting and fishing in Moreton Bay.

== Demographics ==
At the 2011 census, Welsby had a population of 4 people.

In the 2016 census, Welsby had a population of 5 people.

In the 2021 census, Welsby had "no people or a very low population".

== Education ==
There are no schools in Welsby. The nearest government primary school is Banksia Beach State School in neighbouring Banksia Beach to the south. The nearest government secondary school is Bribie Island State High School in Bongaree to the south.

== Attractions ==
Wild Banks is a 176.213-hectare (435.43-acre) artificial reef in the Moreton Bay Marine Park (26.9086°S 153.2927°E) offshore on the western (ocean) side of Welsby. This reef has a number of "fish cages" which are designed to attract pelargic fish species such as mackerel, dolphin fish and wahoo.
