= Toorbul, Queensland =

Toorbul
- Town
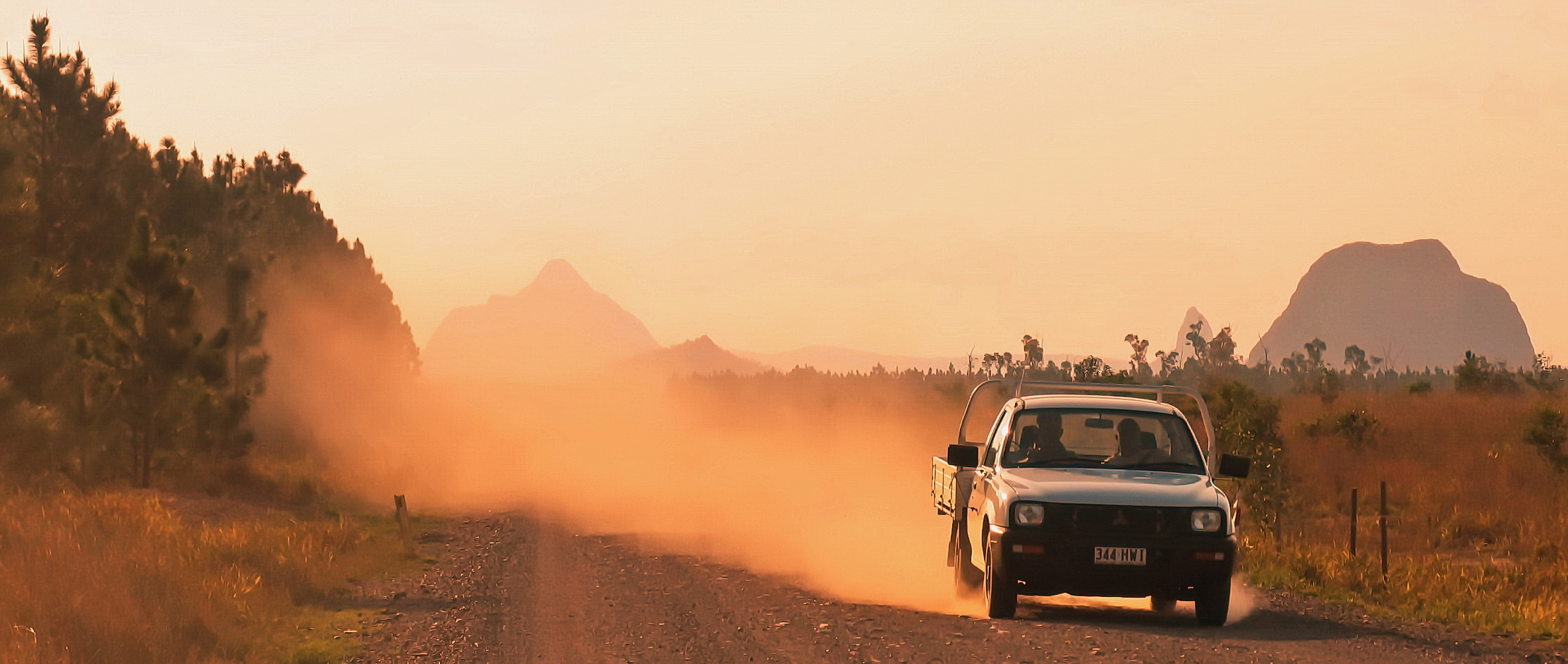
- Toorbul with Glasshouse Mountains beyond, 2022

- Interactive map of Toorbul
- Coordinates: 27.0363°S 153.1002°E
- Country: Australia
- State: Queensland
- LGA: City of Moreton Bay
- Location: 20.0 km (12.4 mi) ENE of Caboolture; 68.6 km (42.6 mi) NNE of Brisbane CBD

Government
  - State electorate: Pumicestone
  - Federal division: Longman

Area
  - Total: 25.8 km^{2} (10.0 sq mi)

Population
  - Total: 958 (2021 census)
  - Density: 37.13/km^{2} (96.17/sq mi)
- Time zone: UTC+10:00 (AEST)
- Postcode: 4510
Localities around Toorbul
Donnybrook	Meldale	Welsby
Elimbah	Toorbul	White Patch; Banksia Beach
Caboolture	Ningi	Sandstone Point; Bellara

Toorbul is a coastal town and a locality in the City of Moreton Bay, Queensland, Australia. In the 2021 census, the locality of Toorbul had a population of 958 people.

== Geography ==
Toorbul is 49 kilometres (30 mi) north of Brisbane. Toorbul is bounded on the east by Pumicestone Channel which separates mainland Queensland from Bribie Island. It is bounded to the north by Elimbah Creek and to the south by Ningi Creek, both which flow into the Pumicestone Channel. There are a number of low flat islands immediately off the coast which are included within the locality including Parrot Island and Shag Island.

The town is located along the north-east coast of the locality.

Pumicestone Road connects the entire locality running from the west (Caboolture) through to the town on the eastern coast.

== History ==
The town takes its name from Toorbul Point, which is believed to be a Yuggera language (Yugarabul dialect) word referring to a specific Aboriginal people associated with the Ninghi area. However, Toorbul Point is not within the present day boundaries of the locality of Toorbul but in Sandstone Point to the south-east.

Toorbul Provisional School opened circa 1891. On 1 January 1909, it became Toorbul State School. It experienced some temporary closures most likely due to low student numbers and closed permanently circa 1935. It was on a 20,310 m^{2} (5.02-acre) site at 1461-1477 Pumicestone Road (27.0433°S 153.0692°E).

In 1944 during World War II, RAAF 210 Radar Station was established at 1295 Pumicestone Road. It was a British-designed Advanced Chain Overseas (ACO) radar stations, one of four constructed in Queensland.

== Demographics ==
In the 2011 census, the locality of Toorbul had a population of 877 people, 47.2% female and 52.8% male. The median age of the Toorbul population was 53 years, 16 years above the national median of 37. 80% of people living in Toorbul were born in Australia. The other top responses for country of birth were England 3.1%, New Zealand 1.3%, Papua New Guinea 0.6%, Finland 0.3%, Denmark 0.3%. 88.2% of people spoke only English at home; the next most common languages were 0.3% Finnish, 0.3% Japanese.

In the 2016 census, the locality of Toorbul had a population of 930 people.

In the 2021 census, the locality of Toorbul had a population of 958 people.

== Transport ==
There is no regular public bus service in Donnybrook, however there is one bus service every Thursday. This service is operated under route 9999. It travels from Toorbul via Donnybrook providing connection to services at Caboolture and Morayfield.

== Amenities ==
The Moreton Bay Regional Council operates a mobile library service which visits the Jetty Car Park on The Esplanade.

== Education ==
There are no schools in Toorbul. The nearest government primary school is Pumicestone State School and the nearest government secondary school in Caboolture State High School, both in neighbouring Caboolture to the south-west.
