= Woorim, Queensland =

Woorim Bribie Island, Queensland
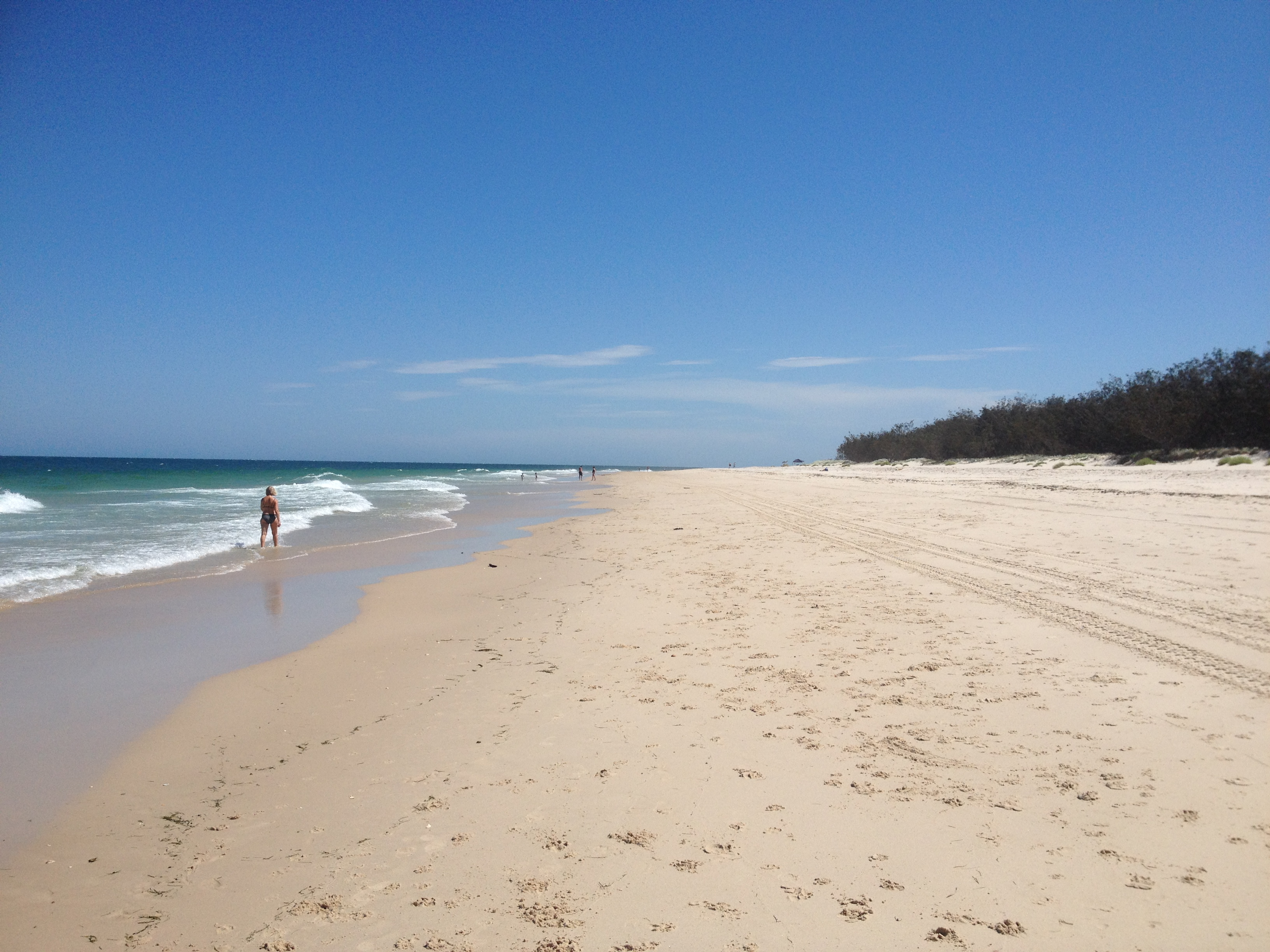
- Woorim Beach

- Coordinates: 27.0699°S 153.2034°E
- Population: 1,843 (2021 census)
  - Density: 70.61/km^{2} (182.9/sq mi)
- Postcode(s): 4507
- Area: 26.1 km^{2} (10.1 sq mi)
- Time zone: AEST (UTC+10:00)
- Location: 4.5 km (3 mi) E of Bongaree; 39.0 km (24 mi) E of Caboolture; 74.0 km (46 mi) NNE of Brisbane CBD
- LGA(s): City of Moreton Bay
- State electorate(s): Pumicestone
- Federal division(s): Longman
Localities around Woorim:
Banksia Beach	Welsby	Coral Sea
Bellara	Woorim	Coral Sea
Bongaree	Moreton Bay	Coral Sea

Woorim is a town and suburb of Bribie Island in the City of Moreton Bay, Queensland, Australia. In the 2021 census, the suburb of Woorim had a population of 1,843 people.

== Geography ==
Woorim is on the south-eastern corner of Bribie Island, bounded by the Coral Sea to the east and Moreton Bay to the south. Bald Point is on the southern beach (27.0959°S 153.1950°E).

Most of the north and west of the locality is within the Bribie Island National Park which extends into neighbouring Bongaree and Welsby.

First Avenue connects Woorim to Bongaree and from there across the Bribie Island Bridge to the mainland.

The Bribie Island Research Centre of the Queensland Department of Agriculture and Fisheries is an aquaculture research facility at 144 North Street (27.0543°S 153.1952°E).

Erosion of the beach at Woorim is an ongoing issue with long term recession trends of the shoreline observed. In September 2007 Caboolture Shire Council (now amalgamated into the Moreton Bay Regional Council) published a Shoreline Erosion Management Plan in response.

== History ==
The name Woorim may be derived from the Kabi language word wurama meaning red backed sea eagle.

The Bribie Island Fortifications were constructed from 1939 to 1943 as part of the systems of defence of southeast Queensland during the Second World War, and to provide artillery training for Australian soldiers for overseas service. Other fortifications were also apparent throughout Moreton Bay during the war, at Caloundra and on Moreton Island at Cowan Cowan Point and Rous, which together with the existing installations at Fort Lytton, provided a coordinated series of defensive batteries for the region.

== Demographics ==
In the 2011 census, the suburb of Woorim had a population of 1,765 people, 52.4% female and 47.6% male. The median age of the Woorim population was 55 years, 18 years above the national median of 37. 70.5% of people living in Woorim were born in Australia. The other top responses for country of birth were England 6.3%, New Zealand 4.5%, Bhutan 1.1%, Netherlands 1.1%, Scotland 0.7%. 86.3% of people spoke only English at home; the next most common languages were 1.5% Nepali, 0.5% Greek, 0.4% Dutch, 0.2% Afrikaans, 0.2% German.

In the 2016 census, the suburb of Woorim had a population of 1,829 people, with a median age of 57 years.

In the 2021 census, the suburb of Woorim had a population of 1,843 people.

== Heritage listings ==
Woorim has a number of heritage sites, including:

- Bribie Island Second World War Fortifications (27.0577°S 153.1988°E & 27.0196°S 153.1754°E)

== Education ==
There are no schools in Woorim. The nearest government primary school is Bribie Island State School in neighbouring Bongaree to the south-west. The nearest government secondary school is Bribie Island State High School, also in Bongaree.

== Amenities ==
Woorim has a beach, a small shopping centre, and parklands adjoining the beach.

Bribie Island Golf Club at 5 Links Court (27.0822°S 153.2013°E) has an 18-hole par-72 course, a distance of 6,203 metres (20,351 ft).
