= White Patch, Queensland =

White Patch Bribie Island, Queensland
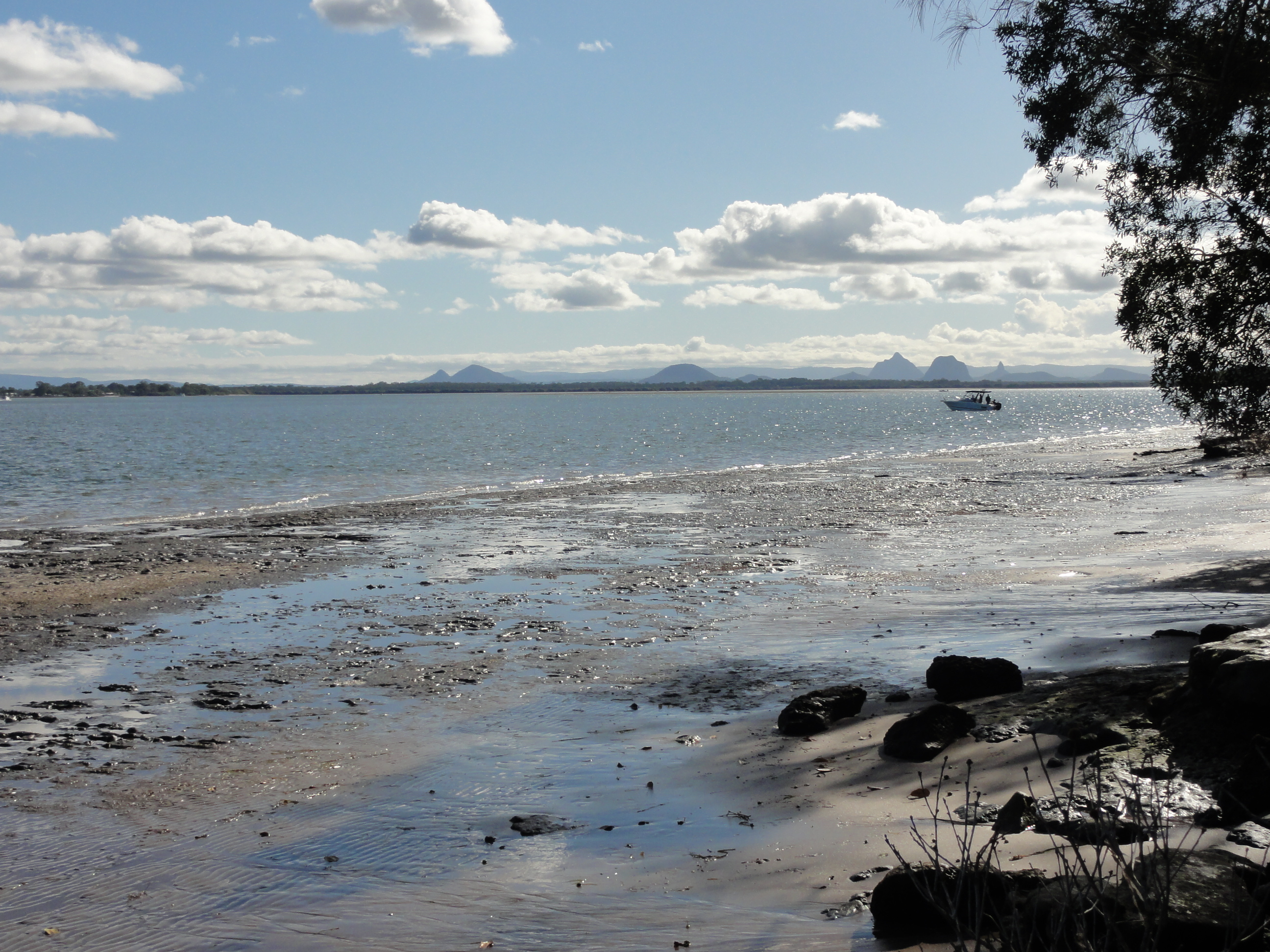
- View from the beach at White Patch

- Coordinates: 27.0300°S 153.1236°E
- Population: 150 (2021 census)
  - Density: 57.7/km^{2} (149/sq mi)
- Postcode(s): 4507
- Area: 2.6 km^{2} (1.0 sq mi)
- Time zone: AEST (UTC+10:00)
- Location: 7.4 km (5 mi) NW of Bongaree; 28.1 km (17 mi) ENE of Caboolture; 71.6 km (44 mi) NNE of Brisbane CBD
- LGA(s): City of Moreton Bay
- State electorate(s): Pumicestone
- Federal division(s): Longman
Localities around White Patch:
Welsby	Welsby	Welsby
Toorbul	White Patch	Banksia Beach
Toorbul	Toorbul	Banksia Beach

White Patch is a coastal town and locality of Bribie Island in the City of Moreton Bay, Queensland, Australia. In the 2021 census, the locality of White Patch had a population of 150 people.

== Geography ==
White Patch is on the western side of Bribie Island, adjacent to the Pumicestone Channel which forms its western boundary. Wright Creek passes through the southern part of the locality into Pumicestone Channel. The land along the western coast has residential development. The remaining land is undeveloped land, with two areas (26.9095°N 153.1066°E and 27.0243°S 153.1209°E) being within the Bribie Island National Park.

== History ==
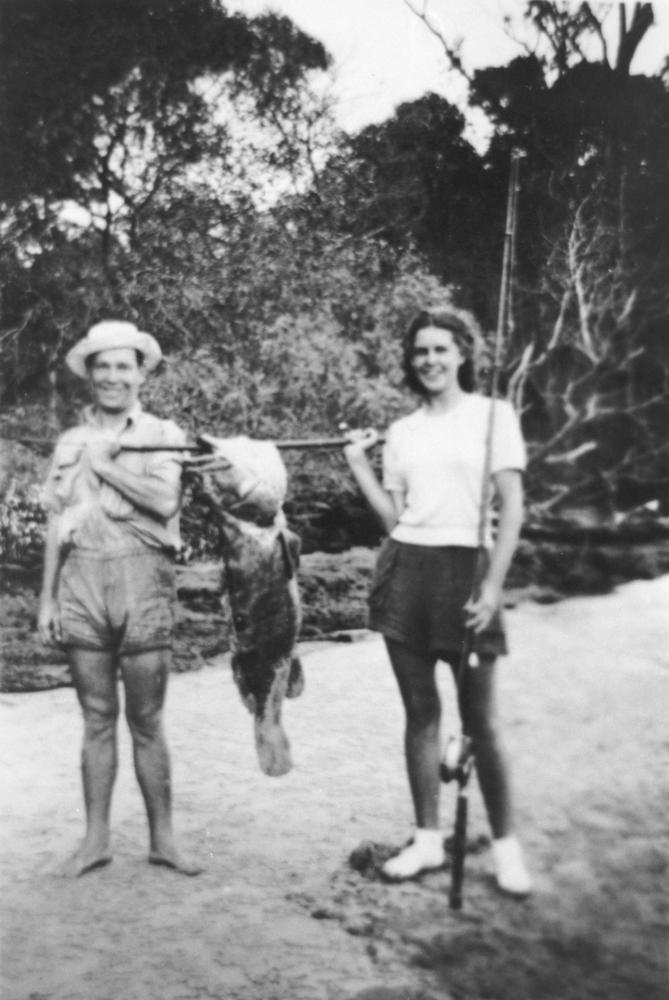
Large Rock Cod caught at the White Patch, 1936

The town was originally called Bribie, but was renamed White Patch on 1 September 1980. The name White Patch refers a sand patch formerly visible from Pumicestone Channel.

In 1799 Matthew Flinders beached his sloop Norfolk for repairs at White Patch.

The Queensland Government sold 140 town lots in the Town of Bribie at the "White Patch" in 1887.

A Department of Public Lands cadastral map drawn up in June 1925 shows properties facing Pumicestone Channel, bordered by Maud street on the north west, Charles Street to the north and Bunbuba Street on the south east.

In November 1948, fishermen at White Patch claimed to have seen a sea serpent. It was described as being brown or yellow "like a banana", 18 to 24 feet (5.5 to 7.3 m) long with large eyes and was accompanied by smaller serpents (possibly its young). It was said to hiss and squeak. In December 1948, Eric Decker, the Member of the Queensland Legislative Assembly for Sandgate, caught such a "serpent" while on holidays at Bribie Island. Mr Mack, curator at the Queensland Museum, said the description was consistent with a common sea snake in Moreton Bay.

== Demographics ==
In the 2011 census, the locality of White Patch had a population of 112 people, 50% female and 50% male. The median age of the White Patch population was 53 years, 16 years above the national median of 37. 68.4% of people living in White Patch were born in Australia. The other top responses for country of birth were England 14%, New Zealand 4.4%, Germany 3.5%, Netherlands 3.5%, Sweden 2.6%. 92.2% of people spoke only English at home; the next most common languages were 2.6% French, 2.6% Swedish.

In the 2016 census, the locality of White Patch had a population of 142 people.

In the 2021 census, the locality of White Patch had a population of 150 people.

== Education ==
There are no schools in White Patch. The nearest government primary school is Banksia Beach State School in neighbouring Banksia Beach to the south-east. The nearest government secondary school is Bribie Island State High School in Bongaree to the south-east.

== Attractions ==
A talking monument, located in nearby Banksia Beach, tells the story of the landing of Matthew Flinders on Bribie Island in July 1799.
