= Bellara =

Bellara may refer to:

- Bellara, Queensland
- Bellara, Tumkur, Karnataka, India in Tumkur district
