= Banksia Beach, Queensland =

Banksia Beach
- Town
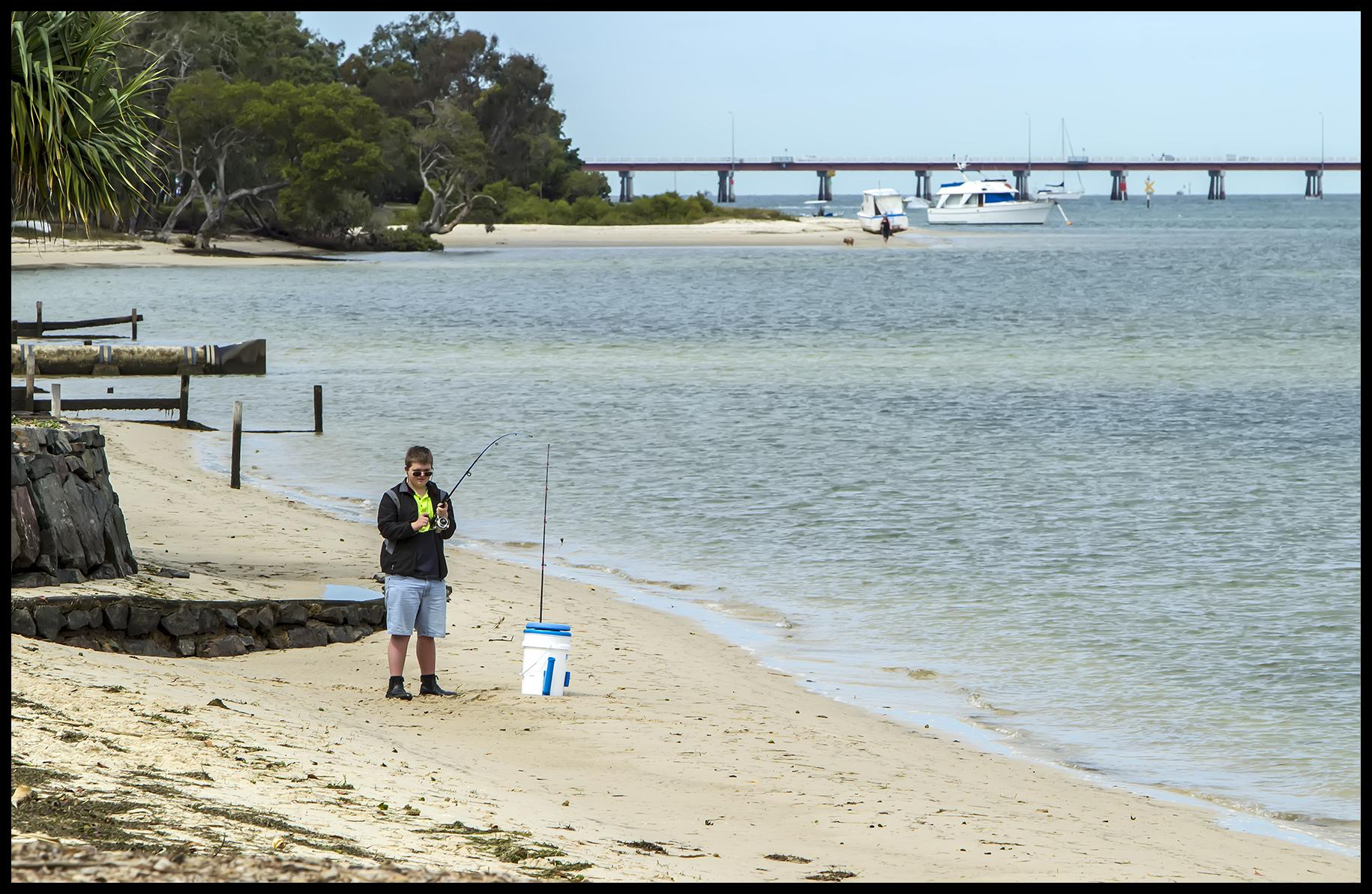
- Fishing at Banksia Beach with the Bribie Island Bridge in the background

- Interactive map of Banksia Beach
- Coordinates: 27.0416°S 153.1416°E
- Country: Australia
- State: Queensland
- City: Bribie Island
- LGA: City of Moreton Bay
- Location: 5.4 km (3.4 mi) NNW of Bongaree; 26.0 km (16.2 mi) ENE of Caboolture; 69.6 km (43.2 mi) NNE of Brisbane CBD

Government
  - State electorate: Pumicestone
  - Federal division: Longman

Area
  - Total: 8.0 km^{2} (3.1 sq mi)

Population
  - Total: 7,180 (2021 census)
  - Density: 898/km^{2} (2,325/sq mi)
- Time zone: UTC+10:00 (AEST)
- Postcode: 4507
Localities around Banksia Beach
White Patch	Welsby	Woorim
Pumicestone Channel	Banksia Beach	Woorim
Pumicestone Channel	Bellara	Woorim

Banksia Beach is a town and suburb on Bribie Island in the City of Moreton Bay, Queensland, Australia. In the 2021 census, the suburb of Banksia Beach had a population of 7,180 people.

== Geography ==
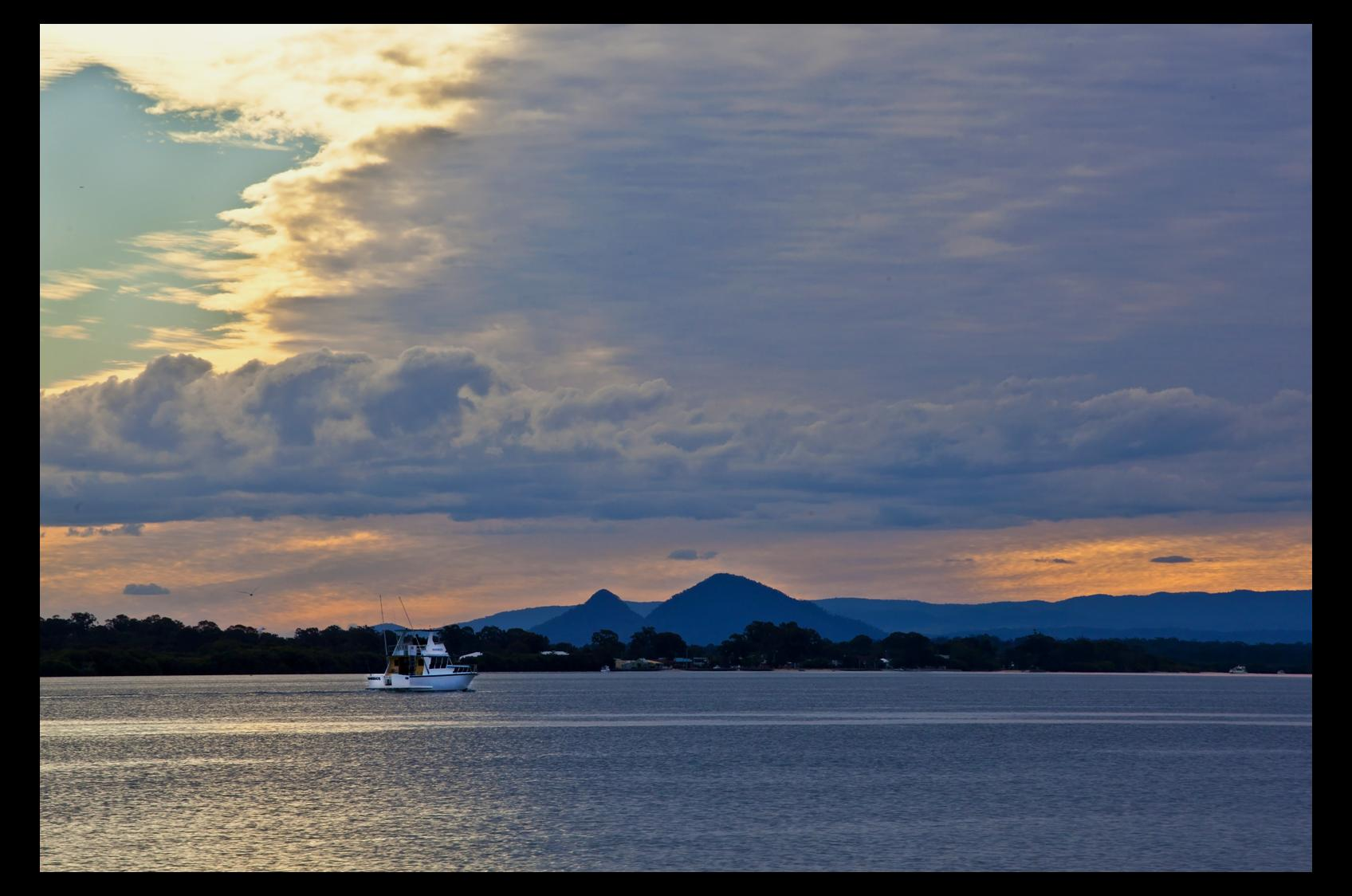
Looking from Banksia Beach across the Pumicestone Channel towards the Glass House Mountains

Banksia Beach is on the western coast of Bribie Island, separated from mainland Queensland by the Pumicestone Channel.

The western part of the suburb is within the Bribie Island National Park. Apart from that the land use is almost entirely residential. The areas closest to the coast are developed as canal estates, while the northern part of the suburb is residential housing intermingled with the Pacific Harbour Golf & Country Club.

== History ==
The name Banksia Beach was the name of the estate subdivision assigned by the land developer Jock McIlwain. It was named as a township by the Qld Place Names Board on 23 November 1972. The name refers to the plant genus Banksia, which grows in the area.

Historically Dux Creek flows into the Pumicestone Channel at 27.0528°S 153.1352°E with:

- Banksia Beach to the north of the creek mouth (27.0441°S 153.1329°E)
- Sylvan Beach to the south of the creek mouth (27.0645°S 153.1443°E) extending south to Quota Park in Bongaree

but the canal development has replaced Dux Creek with two canal developments with Skippers Canal effectively replacing Dux Creek and extending south with Voyagers Canal extending to the north.

As part of the Australian Bicentenery commemoration, a monument to the exploration of Matthew Flinders was erected beside the beach and officially unveiled on 16 July 1988. It was designed by Kirsti Simpson and sculpted from Helidon sandstone by Tom Farrell.

Banksia Beach State School opened on 28 January 1992.

== Demographics ==
In the 2016 census, the suburb of Banksia Beach had a population of 5,995 people.

In the 2021 census, the suburb of Banksia Beach had a population of 7,180 people.

== Education ==
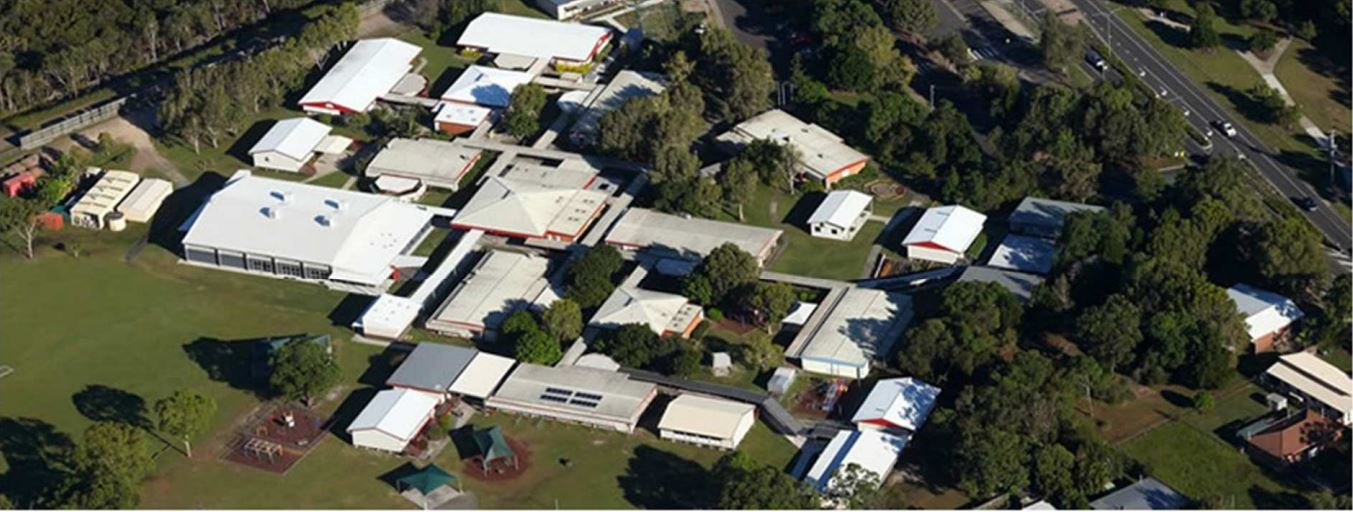
Banksia Beach State School, 2017

Banksia Beach State School is a government co-educational primary school (Early Childhood-6) at 133 Sunderland Road (27.0463°S 153.1483°E). In 2018, the school had an enrolment of 1046 students with 70 teachers (64 full-time equivalent) and 43 non-teaching staff (28 full-time equivalent). It includes a special education program.

There are no secondary schools in Banksia Beach. The nearest government secondary school is Bribie Island State High School in Bongaree to the south.

== Amenities ==
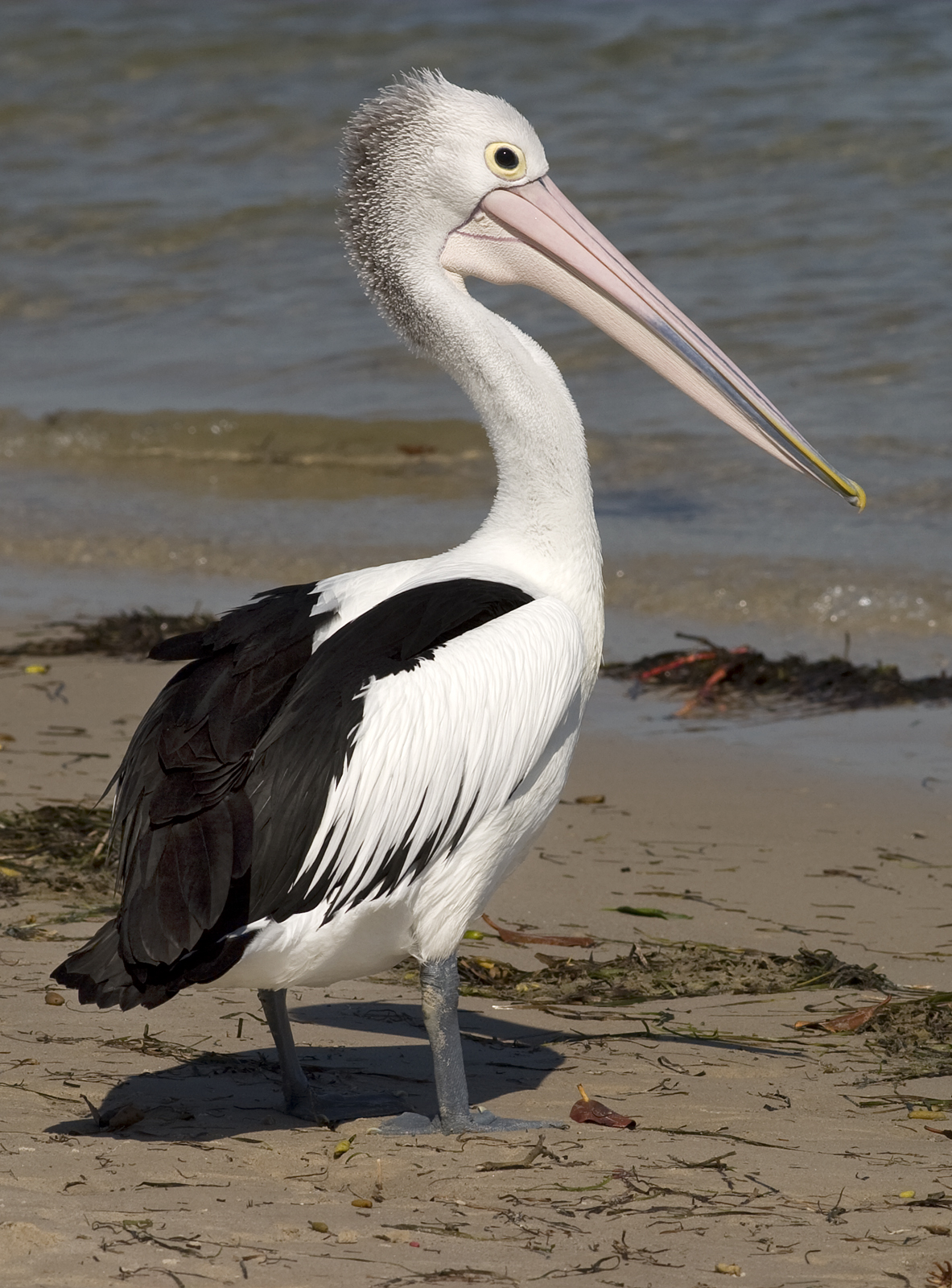
Pelican at Banksia Beach

Bribie Harbour Shopping Village is a shopping centre at 25 Sunderland Drive (27.0446°S 153.1385°E).

Bribie Island Community Arts Centre is an art gallery and community art centre at 191 Sunderland Drive (27.0482°S 153.1534°E).

Pacific Harbour Golf & Country Club is an 18-hole golf course at 141-159 Avon Avenue (27.0314°S 153.1486°E).

Solander Lake Bowls Club is at 70 Sunderland Drive (27.0457°S 153.1405°E).

There are a number of parks in the suburb, including:

- Col Fisher Park (27.0380°S 153.1326°E)
- Cosmos Park (27.0466°S 153.1415°E)
- Dampier Park (27.0400°S 153.1475°E)
- Oxley Park (27.0368°S 153.1481°E)

== Attractions ==
The Matthew Flinders Exploration monument is in Col Fisher Park at the northern end of Solander Esplanade (27.0374°S 153.1330°E).
