= Meldale, Queensland =

Meldale
- Suburb
- Interactive map of Meldale
- Coordinates: 27.0288°S 153.0655°E
- Country: Australia
- State: Queensland
- LGA: City of Moreton Bay
- Location: 17.0 km (10.6 mi) NE of Caboolture; 61.4 km (38.2 mi) N of Brisbane CBD

Government
  - State electorate: Pumicestone
  - Federal division: Longman

Area
  - Total: 6.7 km^{2} (2.6 sq mi)

Population
  - Total: 230 (2021 census)
  - Density: 34.3/km^{2} (88.9/sq mi)
- Time zone: UTC+10:00 (AEST)
- Postcode: 4510
Suburbs around Meldale
Donnybrook	Donnybrook	Welsby
Donnybrook	Meldale	Pumicestone Passage
Toorbul	Toorbul	Pumicestone Passage

Meldale is a coastal rural locality in the City of Moreton Bay, Queensland, Australia. In the 2021 census, Meldale had a population of 230 people.

== Geography ==
Meldale is 61.4 kilometres (38.2 mi) by road north of Brisbane, the state capital of Queensland.

Meldale is bounded by Bullock Creek to the north, the Pumicestone Channel (27.0158°S 153.0899°E) to the north-east (separating the mainland from Bribie Island), and Elimbah Creek to the south and east.

== History ==
The locality was named on 2 July 1983 and is through to be a combination of the surnames of two local land owners: Mellish and Daly.

== Demographics ==
In the 2011 census, Meldale recorded a population of 362 people, 43.1% female and 56.9% male. The median age of the Meldale population was 45 years, 8 years above the national median of 37. 75.7% of people living in Meldale were born in Australia. The other top responses for country of birth were New Zealand 5.5%, England 4.4%, Germany 1.4%, Canada 1.1%, Fiji 1.1%. 89.6% of people spoke only English at home; the next most common languages were 0.8% French, 0.8% Vietnamese, 0.8% Mandarin.

In the 2016 census, Meldale had a population of 223 people.

In the 2021 census, Meldale had a population of 230 people.

== Education ==
There are no schools in Meldale. The nearest government primary school is Pumicestone State School in Caboolture to the south-west. The nearest government secondary school is Caboolture State High School, also in Caboolture.

== Amenities ==
There is a boat ramp in Way Street giving access to Elimbah Creek (27.0335°S 153.0775°E). It is managed by the Moreton Bay City Council.
