= Bribie Island Seaside Museum =

Coordinates: 27.08592°S 153.15947°E

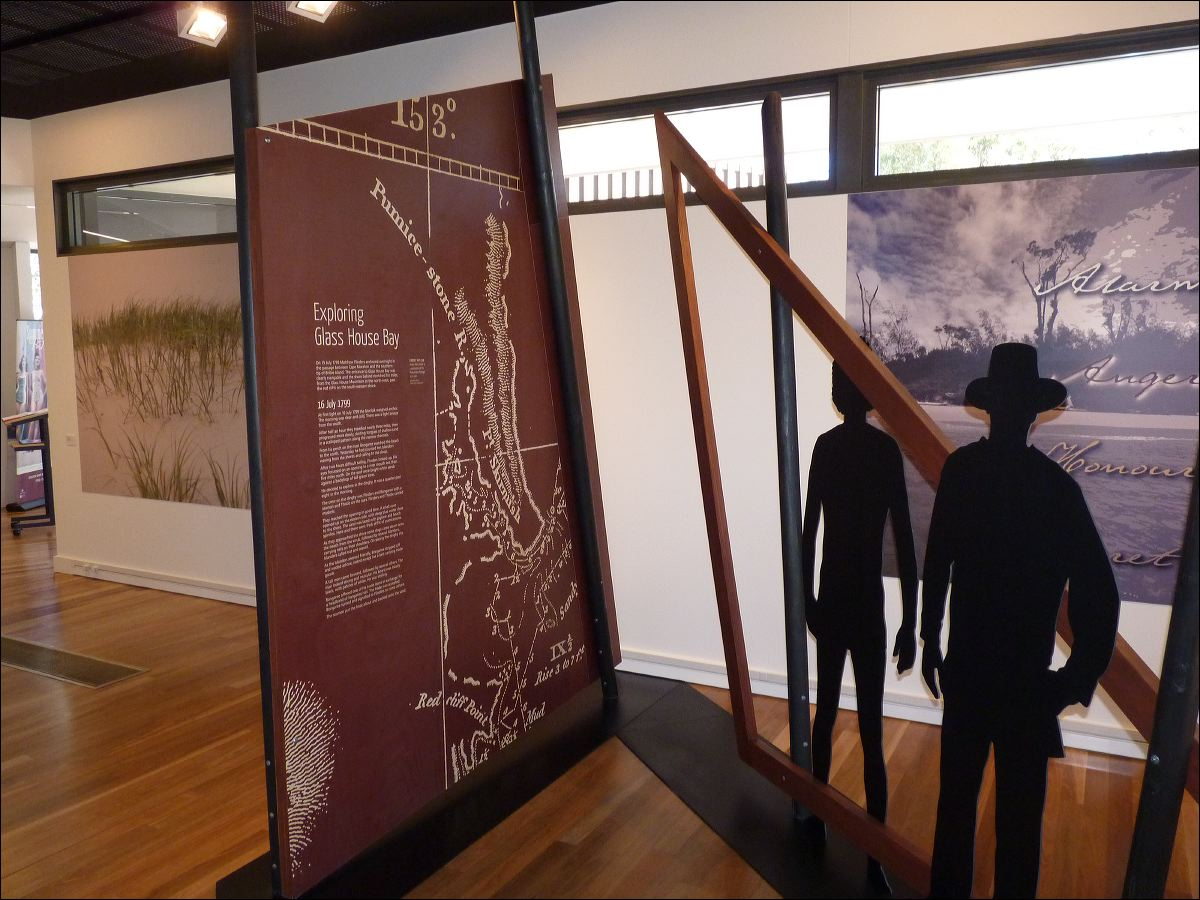
View of the Bribie Island Seaside Museum's permanent display "More than a skirmish" documenting the arrival of Matthew Flinders and Bongaree on Bribie Island.

Bribie Island Seaside Museum is a local history museum operated by the City of Moreton Bay. It opened on 14 May 2010 at 1 South Esplanade, Bongaree, on the Pumicestone Passage side of Bribie Island, in Queensland, Australia.

The Queensland Government contributed $1 million to the museum’s construction through the Q150 Legacy Infrastructure program.

During her visit in August 2010, Queensland Local Government Minister Desley Boyle suggested Bribie Island was arguably the birthplace of Queensland's tourism industry, referring to the steam ship Koopa's regular run to the island carrying 800 passengers.

== See also ==
- List of museums in Queensland
