= Bellara, Queensland =

Bellara Bribie Island, Queensland
- Coordinates: 27.0594°S 153.1483°E
- Population: 3,278 (2021 census)
  - Density: 993/km^{2} (2,570/sq mi)
- Postcode(s): 4507
- Area: 3.3 km^{2} (1.3 sq mi)
- Time zone: AEST (UTC+10:00)
- Location: 22.4 km (14 mi) E of Caboolture; 66.0 km (41 mi) NNE of Brisbane CBD
- LGA(s): City of Moreton Bay
- State electorate(s): Pumicestone
- Federal division(s): Longman
Suburbs around Bellara:
Pumicestone Channel	Banksia Beach	Woorim
Pumicestone Channel	Bellara	Woorim
Pumicestone Channel	Bongaree	Bongaree

Bellara is a suburb of Bribie Island in the City of Moreton Bay, Queensland, Australia. In the 2021 census, Bellara had a population of 3,278 people.

== Geography ==
Bellara is on the western side of Bribie Island, adjacent to the Pumicestone Channel (26.9463°S 153.0751°E) which separates the island from the mainland Queensland. Bribie Island Bridge connects Bellara and Bongaree (27.0682°S 153.1479°E) to Sandstone Point on the mainland.

There is a long sandy beach called Sylvan Beach (27.0606°S 153.1399°E) along the coast of the suburb extending north to Banksia Beach and south to Bongaree.

== History ==
The name Bellara was approved by the Queensland Place Names Board on 1 July 1961. It is an Aboriginal word meaning good.

== Demographics ==
In the 2011 census, Bellara recorded a population of 3,157 people, 51.4% female and 48.6% male. The median age of the Bellara population was 54 years, 17 years above the national median of 37. 77.2% of people living in Bellara were born in Australia. The other top responses for country of birth were England 6.5%, New Zealand 3.9%, Scotland 1.1%, Germany 0.7%, Netherlands 0.6%. 92.6% of people spoke only English at home; the next most common languages were 0.4% French, 0.3% Tagalog, 0.3% German, 0.3% Italian, 0.2% Serbian.

In the 2016 census Bellara had a population of 3,225 people.

In the 2021 census, Bellara had a population of 3,278 people.

== Education ==
There are no schools in Bellara. The nearest government primary schools are Banksia Beach State School in neighbouring Banksia Beach to the north and Bribie Island State School in neighbouring Bongaree to the south. The nearest government secondary school is Bribie Island State High School, also in Bongaree.
