= Bribie Island National Park =

National park in Australia

- IUCN category II (national park)
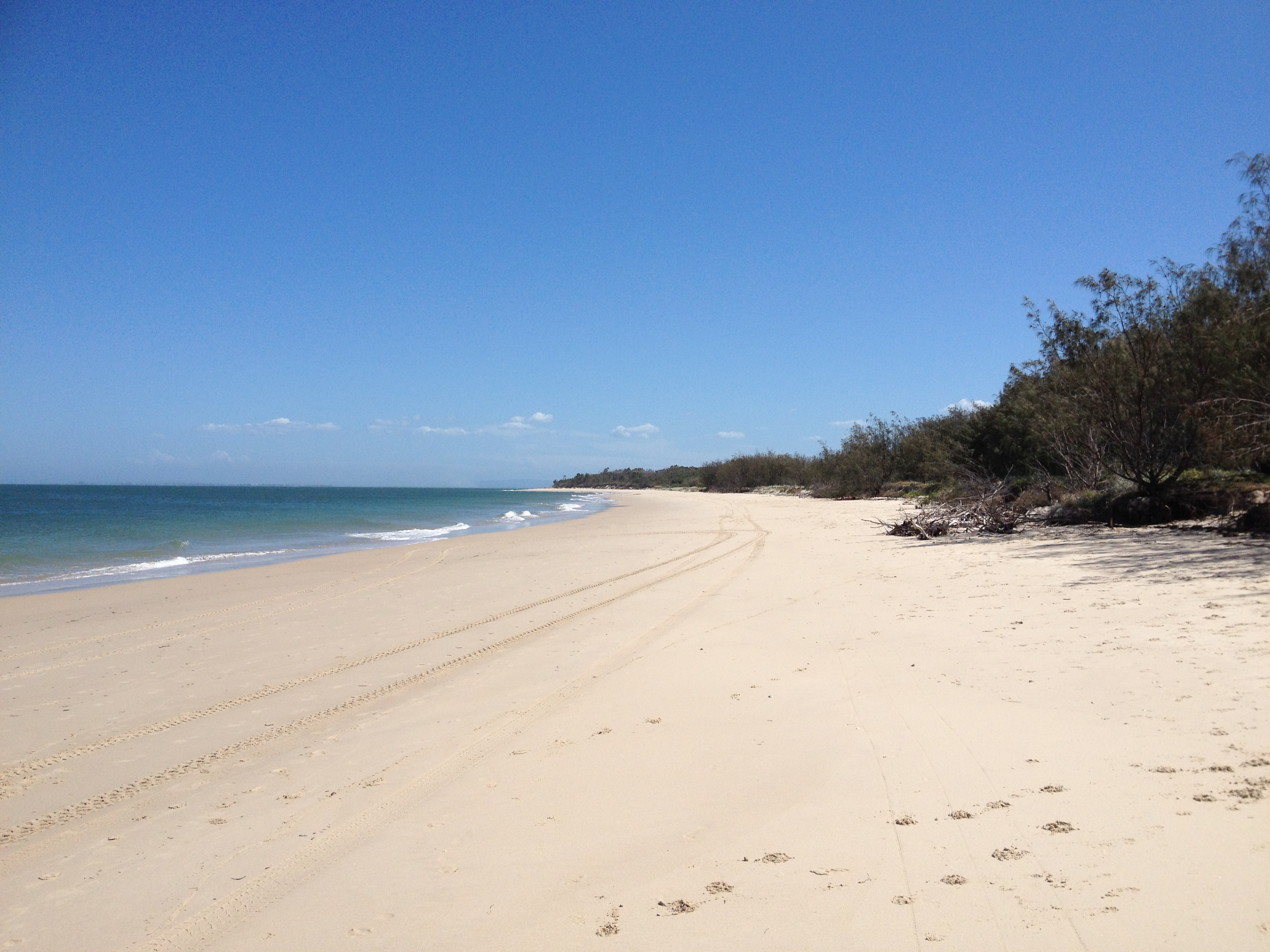
- Woorim Beach

- Location within Queensland
- Location: Queensland
- Coordinates: 26°52′02″S 153°07′36″E
- Area: 49 km^{2} (19 sq mi)
- Established: 1994
- Visitors: 986,000 (domestic visitors only) (in 2012)
- Governing body: Queensland Parks and Wildlife Service
- Website: https://web.archive.org/web/20110406112239/http://www.derm.qld.gov.au/parks/bribie-island/index.html

Bribie Island National Park is an Australian national park in the City of Moreton Bay, Queensland, 68 kilometres (42 miles) north of Brisbane. The park covers approximately one third of Bribie Island. The tidal wetlands and areas of water around the islands are protected within the Moreton Bay Marine Park.

Visitors are attracted to the park for angling, boating and the views of the nearby Glass House Mountains.

This is a great place for bird watchers and lovers of spring wildflowers. The average altitude of the terrain is 10 metres.

== Access ==
The beach is accessible by 4WD from Woorim on the east side of the island. However, to drive in the national park, one must first acquire a Vehicle Permit from either the Bongaree Caravan Park or the national parks website. There is also an Inland Track which goes from White Patch in Banksia Beach to the top of the Ocean Beach camping area.

== Camping ==
There are several camping grounds in the Bribie Island Nation Park. These include: Poverty Creek, which has 12 campsites as well as an open camping ground which holds 80, Gallaghers Point which has six campsites, Mission Point which has 12 campsites which are only accessible by boat, Lime Pocket which has six campsites, also only accessible by boat and Ocean Beach which has 63 campsites. Mission Point has toilets, picnic tables and fireplaces.

A camping permit is required to camp at these sites which can be purchased from the Bongaree Caravan Park or the Queensland Department of Environment and Resources Management website. Generators are not permitted and visitors should bring their own firewood.

== Wildlife ==
At dawn or dusk, kangaroos, wallabies, dingoes, and emus can be seen roaming the island.

== See also ==
- Protected areas of Queensland
