= Bribie Island State High School =

Secondary School in Australia

Location
- First Avenue, Bongaree; Queensland 4507; Australia; 27.0822°S 153.1660°E

Information
- School type: Public, co-educational
- Opened: 23 January 1989
- Principal: Matt Bradley
- Grades: 7 to 12
- Enrollment: 1,176 (2023)
- Website: Official site

Bribie Island State High School is a public co-educational secondary school located in the suburb of Bongaree on Bribie Island, Queensland, Australia. It is administered by the Queensland Department of Education, with an enrolment of 1,176 students and a teaching staff of 98, as of 2023. The school serves students from Year 7 to Year 12.

== History ==
The school opened on 23 January 1989, serving as the prototype of the new HS88 Design Series, a design used by the Department of Education for constructing new high school buildings. The official opening ceremony occurred on 21 July 1989.

The current principal is Mr Matt Bradley.

2025 will see the fourth year of CREST: Ignite and CREST: Innovate for selected students. It will be the first year of having CREST: AFL Program and CREST: Dance Program added to the academy suite.

BISHS CREST programs have been designed to enhance rigor and develop student voice and choice within the curriculum. As a member of any of the CREST academy classes students will be involved in a range of learning experiences that will challenge them in their specific areas of interest and aid in the development of 21st Century skills. These skills will include critical and creative thinking, communication, collaboration and teamwork, personal and social skills and ICT skills.

== Demographics ==
In 2023, the school had a student enrollment of 1,176 with 98 teachers (92 full-time equivalent) and 54 non-teaching staff (44 full-time equivalent). Female enrollments consisted of 594 students and Male enrollments consisted of 582 students; Indigenous enrollments accounted for a total of 10% and 6% of students had a language background other than English.

== See also ==
- Education in Australia
- List of schools in Greater Brisbane
