= Bribie Island =

Island in Queensland, Australia

Native name: Yarun
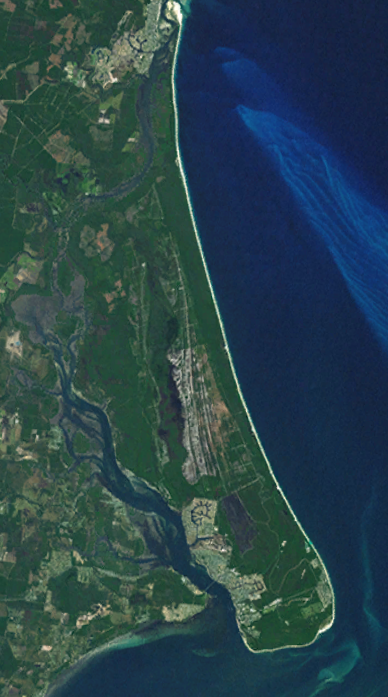
- A NASA Landsat image of Bribie Island

- Location within Queensland

Geography
- Location: Coral Sea
- Coordinates: 26.965°S 153.125°E
- Area: 148 km^{2} (57 sq mi)
- Length: 34 km (21.1 mi)
- Width: 7 km (4.3 mi)

Administration
- Australia
- State: Queensland
- Local Government Areas: City of Moreton Bay & Sunshine Coast Region

Demographics
- Population: 18,189 (2016)

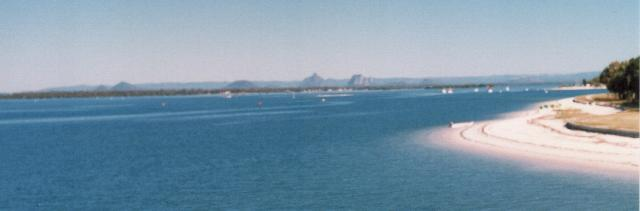
View of the Glass House Mountains from Bribie Island.

Bribie Island is the smallest and most northerly of three major sand islands forming the coastline sheltering the northern part of Moreton Bay, Queensland, Australia. The others are Moreton Island and North Stradbroke Island. Bribie Island is 34 kilometres (21 miles) long, and 8 kilometres (5.0 miles) at its widest. Archibald Meston believed that the name of the island came from a corruption of a mainland word for it, Boorabee meaning koala. However, the correct Joondaburri name for the island is Yarun.

Bribie Island hugs the coastline and tapers to a long spit at its most northern point near Caloundra, and is separated from the mainland by Pumicestone Passage. The ocean side of the island is somewhat sheltered from prevailing winds by Moreton Island and associated sand banks and has only a small surf break. The lee side is calm, with white sandy beaches in the south.

Most of the island is uninhabited national park (55.8 square kilometres or 21.5 square miles) and forestry plantations. The southern end of the island has been intensively urbanised as part of the City of Moreton Bay, the main suburbs being Bongaree, Woorim, Bellara and Banksia Beach. A bridge from Sandstone Point on the mainland to Bellara and Bongaree was completed in 1963.

Buckley's Hole, at the southern tip of the island, is an important bird habitat and refuge.

On 2 January 2022, the ocean broke through the narrow spit of the island 2 km from the northern tip (due to Cyclone Seth culminating with a king tide). This event created a new passage 200 metres wide. With the ocean waves now able to break onto the mainland at Golden Beach, there is significant concern for the effect this will have for residents and businesses there.

== Geography ==
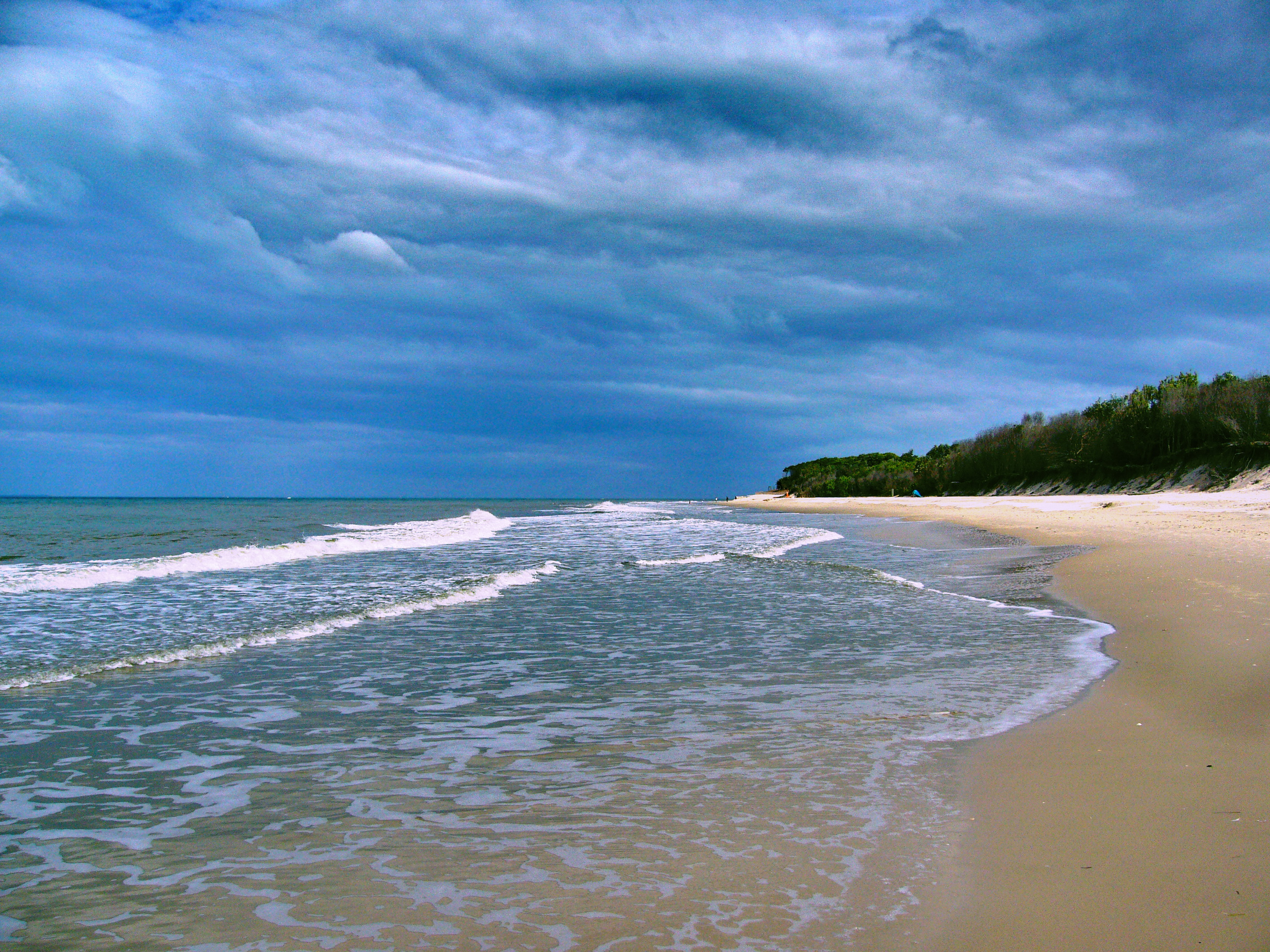
Woorim Beach at Woorim

The island is composed of the same coastal sand plains found on the mainland. The sand has been blown in to two large, low-lying dunes, extending towards the north-west.

=== Suburbs ===
Crossing to southern part of the island from the mainland via the bridge, the first suburb to be encountered is Bellara. The other four suburbs in the southern half of the island are Woorim (about 7 kilometres (4.3 mi) away on the island's 'surf side'), Bongaree at the southern end of the island, on the 'calm side' or 'passage side' and Banksia Beach and White Patch at the northern end of the populated area, also on the 'passage side'. Two other localities, Welsby and Bribie Island North, make up the undeveloped northern part of the island.

Bribie Island North is part of the Sunshine Coast Region while all of the other suburbs on the island are part of the City of Moreton Bay.

=== Transport ===
Caboolture Bus Lines operates a bus service around the Island as well as a route which runs to Caboolture and Morayfield via Ningi and Pebble Beach. In August 2007 an alternative route, via Beachmere and Pebble Beach, was introduced. The service to Caboolture is timed to connect with Queensland Rail train services to and from Brisbane.

== Flora and fauna ==
There are many types of wildlife present on the island. Kangaroos, wallabies, emus, various snake species, green tree frogs and dingos can often be seen venturing from the national park into the surrounding suburbs.

Pumicestone Passage, located between the island and the mainland, is a protected marine park that provides habitat for dugongs, turtles and dolphins. There are also extensive mangrove forests in this area. Eucalypt forests, banksias and heathlands are the predominant vegetation elsewhere.

Bribie Island is home to around 350 species of bird. This includes a range of honeyeater species, lorikeets, waterbirds and birds of prey. Flying foxes (also called fruit bats) visit the area, along with several species of small insect-eating bats. Flying foxes are important pollinators and seed dispersers while the insect-eating bats help control mosquito and other insect populations.

Buckley's Hole, at the southern tip of the island, was declared an environmental park in 1992.

The island seems particularly prone to instances of bee swarming.

=== National Park ===
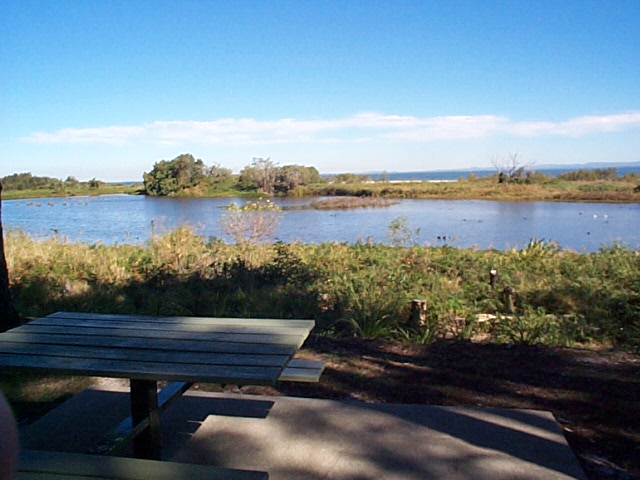
Buckley's Hole Environmental Park

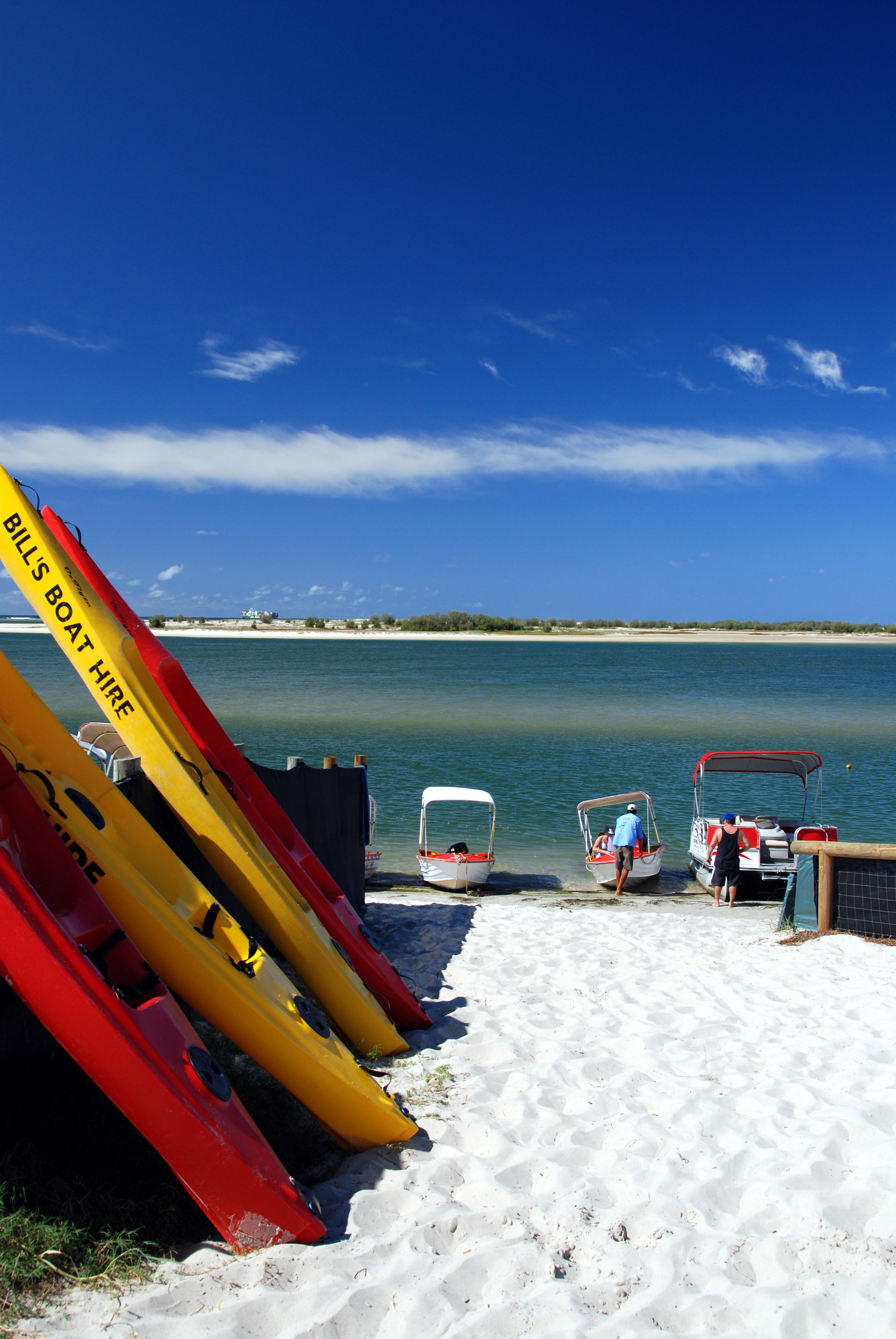
The northern tip of the island is accessed at Caloundra

Bribie Island National Park covers 55.8 square kilometres (21.5 square miles), nearly a third of the total area of the island. There is a common misconception that the national park covers most of the non-inhabited area, but in fact most of the centre of the island consists of conifer plantations closed to public access. Formerly leased to CSR Timber, the Queensland Government is currently re-planting around 25 square kilometres (9.7 square miles) of this area through its DPI Forestry arm. Much of the rest has been developed for housing.

In 2009 the Queenslands National Parks and Wildlife Service (QNPWS) used imported blocks of rock to prevent access to roads and tracks leading into the national park forcing all vehicle access to the park to be via the Beach Access Track at Woorim or the Ranger Station at Whitepatch. All access to the national park now requires a permit to be purchased. Local residents were threatened by letter with fines of up to $16,000 by QNPWS in 2009 for walking domestic animals within the park.

== History ==
=== Pre-European contact ===
The inhabitants of Bribie Island at the time they were encountered by Matthew Flinders in H.M. colonial sloop Norfolk in 1799 were the Djindubari people. broadly part of the 'Kabi' or more correctly Gubbi Gubbi people of South-East Queensland. Meston recorded the pre-contact population of Aboriginal people as 600–1,000, but by 1891 none remained on the Island and only four lived on the mainland.

=== Joondaburri lifestyle ===
The comparatively rich coastal country allowed permanent residence. Natural resources of land and sea were abundant and harvested according to the seasons. Winter mullet schooled from May to July. Dolphins were trained to herd the fish into waiting nets and spears. Winter was the best season for bream, followed by tailor in September and October. In summer mud crabs and oysters were plentiful and dugong were hunted. Summer whiting and flathead were speared or netted. Bungwall Fern was gathered for its starchy roots all year round. Kangaroo, eels and carpet snakes were rich in protein and fat. The dominant shellfish used as food was the oyster known today as the Sydney Rock Oyster known locally as tibir, at that time growing naturally on the seabeds. The oyster middens, many metres thick, were plundered by early settlers for lime. A significant midden site, now lost, was located not far from Bongaree jetty. It contained discarded shells, marsupial bones and stone tools. The biggest of the oyster middens was at White Patch, where dugong were also plentiful. The Ugari (pipi) on the coastal beaches was also eaten.

=== James Cook, 1770 ===
Lieutenant James Cook sighted the Glass House Mountains west of the Island on Thursday 17 May 1770 while sailing up the east coast of Australia in HM Bark Endeavour. He called these hills the Glass Houses as the reflections and the shape of the hills reminded him of the glass manufacturing houses back in England. James Cook named the area Glass House Bay and was the first European to name this stretch of water.

=== Matthew Flinders, 1799 ===
On 16 July 1799 Captain Matthew Flinders left Glass House Bay about two miles (3.2 kilometres) east of the shore in the Norfolk. He sailed south-west between Moreton Island and the mainland parallel to the southern shore of Bribie Island until spotting an opening in the low western shore. He anchored at 8:15am and transferred with a small crew and Bongaree to a smaller craft. He landed on Bribie Island unaware that it wasn't the mainland and met a small group of Aborigines who had gathered on the beach. Although Bongaree didn't speak the same dialect as the local aborigines the meeting was peaceful until one attempted to remove Flinders' hat. Flinders refused and the Europeans and Bongaree returned to their boat. As they left the man who had tried to remove Flinders' hat threw a spear that missed the small boat and crew. Flinders fired his musket at the men on shore and wounded the man who had thrown the spear. The Aborigines fled the beach. Flinders named the southern shore and site of the confrontation Point Skirmish. There is an area on the modern map marked Skirmish Point but should not be confused with the actual place of the incident which is known as South Point.

Flinders needed to repair leaks in his boat and pulled it ashore some five miles (8.0 kilometres) north of the area he had the incident with the locals for those repairs. Once his boat was repaired he explored the mainland side of the passage and scaled Mt. Beerburrum to get a view of the area. He spent 15 days in the region.

It was not until some time later it was determined that this was an island and the changing of the name of the waterway between Bribie Island and the mainland was made at some other point.

=== 19th century ===
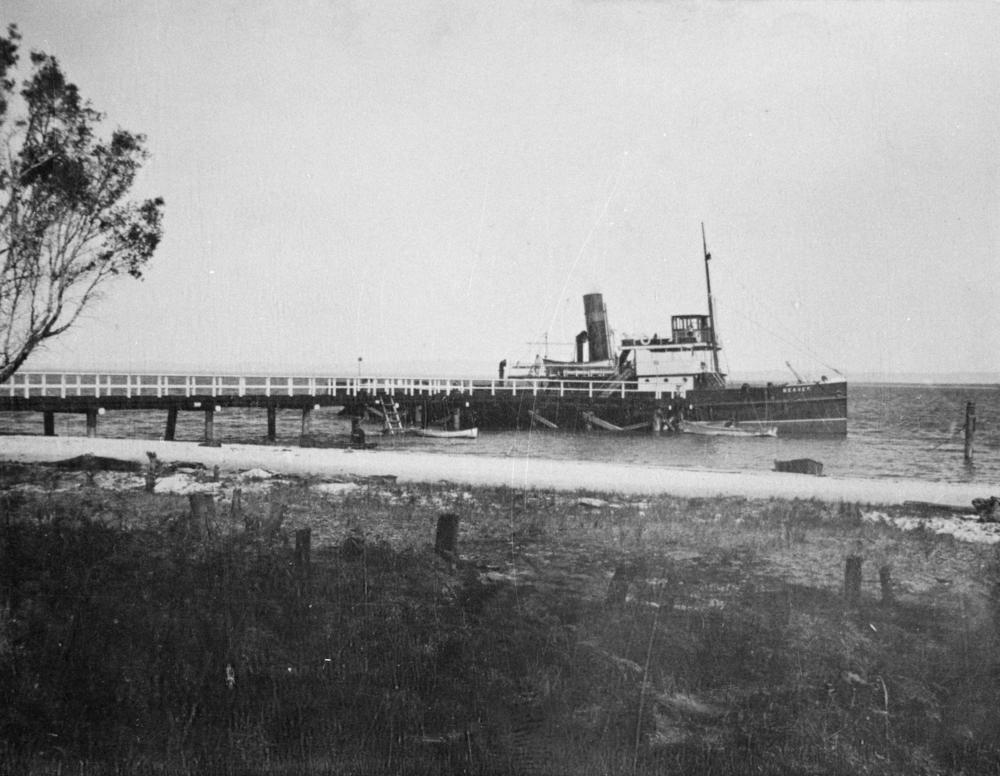
Passenger steamship service, 1912

The origin of the name Bribie are believed to be linked to a convict named Bribie or Breiby who gathered basket-making material on the island in the 1830s. In his memoirs, Tom Petrie wrote:

In those days there was a prisoner among the others who made baskets for the Government called "Bribie, the basket maker." He was not chained, and was allowed to go about in a boat to get cane from the scrubs for his work. ... It was from this man Bribie, my father thinks, that Bribie Island got its name. He cannot remember distinctly on this point, but has some vague recollection of a connection between the man and the island – whether he was blown ashore there, or what, he does not know.

However, author Libby Connors in her book "Warrior", notes that there was a Joondaburri Elder, from Yarun (Bribie Island) by the name of Bribé, ca 1830. Bribé is recorded as taking part in a large intertribal armed conflict, during the 1820s, on a plain near Mt Coot-tha. Other notable aboriginal members present on this occasion were Eulopé, Daki Yakka, Mulrobbin, Moppé, and Gorowamba. This pre-dates the period of the convict "Bribie". It is possible that the convict in fact received his name as a name-exchange from the Joondaburri Elder, Bribé. The indigenous practice of name-exchange between "brothers", could on occasion be extended to a non-indigenous member of their community, under certain circumstances. Tom Archer, Durundur Station owner, wrote of the view of "Briby's Island" from the top of Mt Beerwah in 1841.

In 1890, the Queensland Aboriginal Protection Association established a mission station on Bribie Island. A school and a teacher's residence was established, with two dormitories designed to accommodate 20 residents. By September 1892, suffering financial difficulties and with the site described by Archibald Meston as "mainly ti-tree swamps", the mission was abandoned and residents moved to Myora Mission on North Stradbroke Island.

=== World War II ===
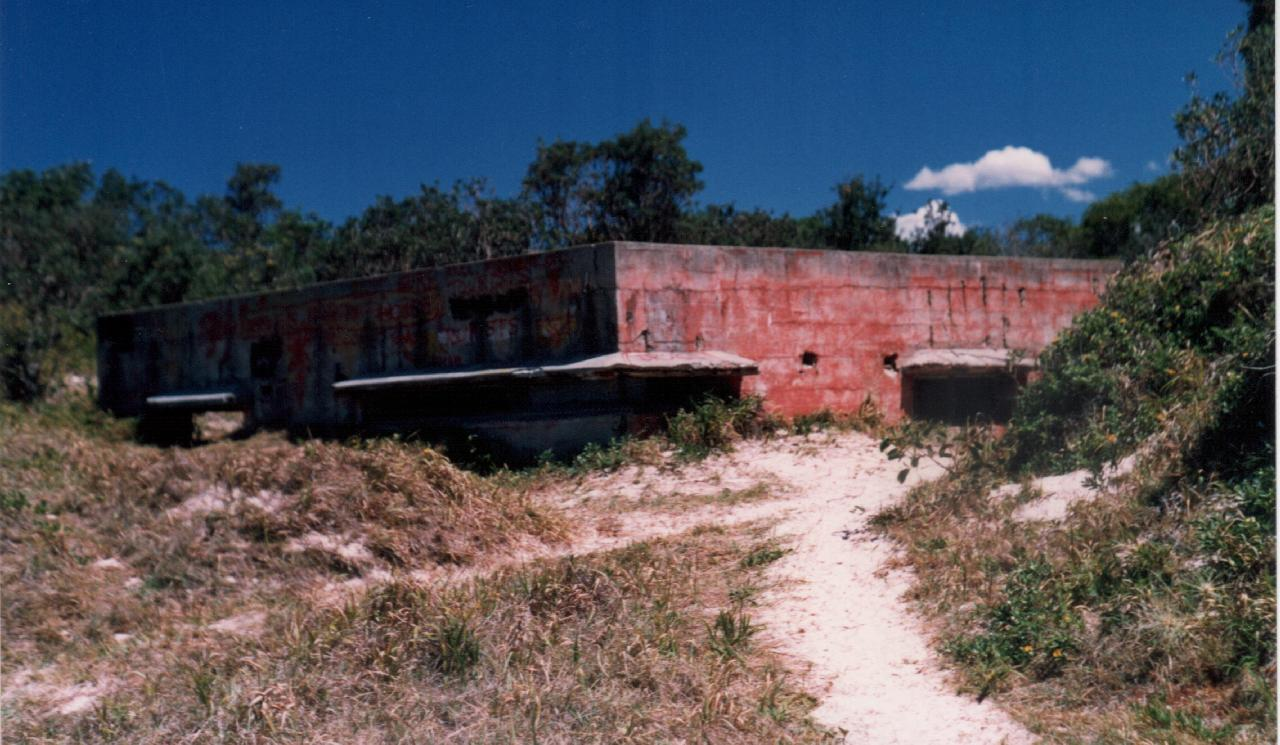
Woorim Battery

Bribie Island fortifications were constructed from 1939 to 1943 as part of the defence of South East Queensland during the Second World War, and to provide artillery training for Australian soldiers. Other fortifications throughout Moreton Bay during the war, included at Caloundra, on Moreton Island at Cowan Cowan Point and Rous. Together with the existing installations at Fort Lytton, they provided a coordinated series of defensive batteries for Moreton Bay.

In February 1939, six months before the start of WW2, a review of the defences of Moreton Bay called for two 6 inch Mark XI guns at north Bribie.

Soon after Australia declared war on Germany on 3 September 1939, 6 inch guns previously carried by the World War I-era cruiser HMAS Sydney were taken to the present location of Fort Bribie (26.8609°S 153.1296°E) to guard the northwest channel, which ran close to the shore near Caloundra, across the bay in a southeasterly direction towards Moreton Island, and then southwesterly towards the mouth of the river, forming a Z-shaped route. The most effective sites for guns were the closest points to the channel bends.

The mounting and placement of the guns was hopelessly inadequate and according to Major General Robert E Jackson, Officer in Charge of Northern Command in July 1940, Fort Bribie was "no value from a defence point of view" and had to be fixed.

Before this could happen an argument about the location broke out, costings being sought for both Bribie and Caloundra. It was argued Caloundra was higher, better equipped and cheaper to build, whereas Bribie was flat, hot, infested with mosquitos and sandflies, had no freshwater, no bridge and would be much more expensive. The decision came down to Fort Bribie's ability to cover both entrances to the northwest channel, while Caloundra could only cover the most northerly entrance. The guns had a range of about 19 kilometres (12 mi).

Colonel JS Whitelaw designed the layout of the fort on Bribie and recommended its completion, receiving the go ahead by early 1942. By April—hastened by the December 1941 attacks by the Japanese forces on Pearl Harbor, Malaya, Hong Kong and Singapore—construction of the gun emplacements was almost complete. The construction cost of all of Fort Bribie's concrete structures was £55,000, about $2.5 million in 2010 dollars.

On 19 February 1942, Darwin was bombed in two raids killing at least 243 people and wounding between 300 and 400 more. By November 1943 Darwin was bombed 64 times, with other towns also attacked including Townsville. The ferocity and success of the attacks suddenly created a very real dread in the Queensland population.

In July 1942 after failing to take Port Moresby by sea in the Battle of the Coral Sea, the Japanese landed on Papua New Guinea's north coast and moved south, capturing Kokoda on 29 July. This was the first time any Australian territory had been occupied by an enemy force.

Reinforcements were sent to Fort Bribie and Fort Cowan Cowan, strengthening the existing defences at the two forts. A number of 155 mm (6.1 in) guns from the First World War were provided to upgrade Australian coastal defences, and new forts were constructed during 1942-43 at Skirmish Point on south Bribie Island and Rous on Moreton Island. The Skirmish Point Battery at Woorim contained two fixed 155-millimetre (6.1 in) gun emplacements on Panama mounts.

The Pacific War also brought the Americans soldiers.

It was widely believed at the time that the American and Australian armed forces and governments had conspired on a plan to abandon Australia north of Brisbane to the Japanese in case of invasion. The plan, known as the Brisbane Line was never official policy, but the alleged strategy gained support after General Douglas MacArthur referred to it during a press conference in March 1943, where he also coined the term 'Brisbane Line'.

Many historians of the WW2 period on Bribie island refer to Brisbane Line and draw it from Fort Bribie due west to Charleville, then south-west to a point just west of Adelaide, as recounted by Warwick Outram in Bribie Memories 2nd edition 2009 ISBN 978-0-9751971-4-1. George H. Johnston, War Correspondent for the Argus newspaper was present when MacArthur mentioned the Brisbane Line on 16 March 1943, but later clarified the matter by writing it was Gen. MacArthur who abandoned the Brisbane Line concept and decided that the battle for Australia should be fought in New Guinea.

At Fort Bribie itself, two mine control huts were used by Royal Australian Navy during 1942 and 1943, known as RAN 2. These monitored and controlled the guard indicator loops and mine loops set in the North West Channel. The indicator loops relied on a moving magnet or any large mass of metal, which naturally acquires magnetic field, to induce a current in a stationary loop of wire. If a submarine was detected by the guard loop, the operator would wait until there was also a swing mine loop before detonating the mines by sending a current down the mine loop. RAN 2 was moved to Cowan Cowan on Moreton Island in September 1943. When the mines in Moreton Bay were decommission at the end of the war, six were missing. One was found at Tewantin in 1945.

The mines weighed 1,430 kilograms (3,150 pounds) and were buoyant, so needed to be moored with sinkers, up to 25 metres (82 feet) below the surface. Every 5 minutes hour perturbations due to the tides known as perts had to be recorded. Daily and weekly tests were carried out on all equipment. In three years of operation, the mines were never detonated.

Another minefield with guard loop built in 1942 protected Pearl Channel and Main Channel south of Bribie Island. The guard loops ran from the Loop Control Hut at the end of North Street, just north of Woorim to Combouyuro Point, Moreton Island. Three Harbour Defence Asdics, sea-bed mounted submarine detection devices now known as sonar, were position down-channel from the guard loops, as a second means of detection.

=== Post-World War II ===
The Bribie Island library opened in 1976 with a major refurbishment in 2016. On 14 December 2020, a king tide broke through the northern tip of the island, causing severe damage.

On 2 January 2022 the ocean broke through the narrow spit of the island 2 km from the northern tip (due to Cyclone Seth culminating with a king tide). This event created a new passage 200 metres wide.

== Heritage listings ==
Bribie Island has a number of heritage-listed sites, including:

- Bribie Island Second World War Fortifications

== Politics ==
At a Federal level, Bribie Island is part of the Division of Longman and has been represented by Terry Young MP, a member of the Liberal National Party of Queensland who sits in the Liberal party room in parliament, since 2019. At a state level Bribie Island is represented by Ariana Doolan, the Liberal National Party Member of the Queensland Legislative Assembly for Pumicestone.

== People ==
The artist Ian Fairweather lived on Bribie Island for many years in self-inflicted poverty. A park on the island is named in his honour at the corner of First Ave and Hunter St Bongaree.

Brisbane Broncos players Jack Reed, an English representative, and Matt Gillett, a State of Origin representative grew up on Bribie Island.

== Bribie Island Bridge ==
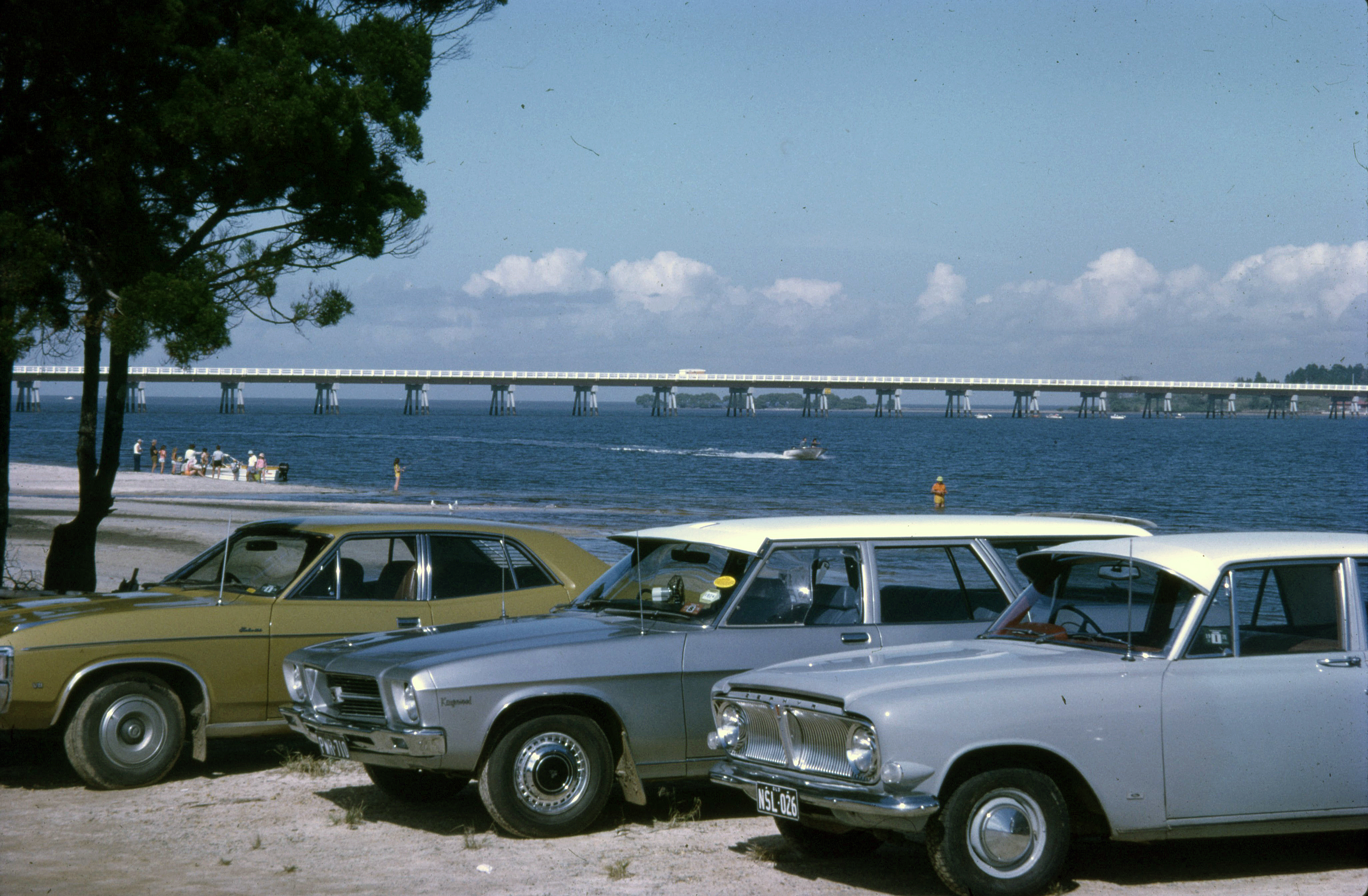
Bribie Island Bridge crossing the Pumistone Passage, 1974

The existing bridge was the longest, pre-stressed, pre-cast concrete bridge in Australia at the time of its construction. With a length of 2736 feet (831.4 m), the bridge cost £520,000 and was officially opened on Saturday 19 October 1963 by the Premier of Queensland Frank Nicklin.

An additional bridge onto Bribie Island has been proposed, and an official Bribie Island Bridge Corridor Study was conducted in 2015 by the Queensland Department of Transport and Main Roads that supports this proposal. The study recommends the new bridge be built 15 metres (49 feet) north of the existing bridge, however the anticipated date of commencement has not yet been announced.

In early 2023, The Queensland Government created plans for the new bridge, the bridge would be 4 lanes, 2 in each direction and have wider pedestrian walkways. Moreton Bay City Council also made plans for the existing bridge to become a "green" bridge, with the 2 traffic lanes to be replaced with shared bicycle-pedestrian lanes, and have greenery line the bridge, The Moreton Bay Council created these plans because it would be "too costly" to demolish the 60 year-old structure, and that it would reduce traffic by making it easier to bike across.

== Desalination plant ==
A desalination plant has been proposed for Bribie Island by the National/Liberal Party (LNP). The previous (up to 2012) Labor government decided it was not a good place to build a Desal Plant. Some residents are opposed to the plant due to environmental reasons, however others see the plant as a benefit to the island.

== Amenities ==
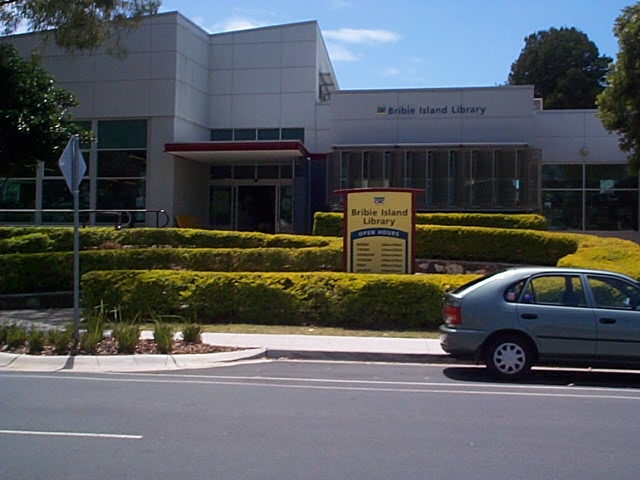
Bribie Island Library, a branch of Moreton Bay City Council's library network, 2006

Bribie Island's main shopping centre is at Bellara, comprising a Woolworths supermarket and a Target store, as well as a number of nationally known companies. The island also has an additional Woolworths supermarket at Banksia Beach. Traditional "strip" development of shopping facilities around the island provides a comprehensive array of retail businesses such as hardware stores, medical centres, newsagents, chemists and food outlets.

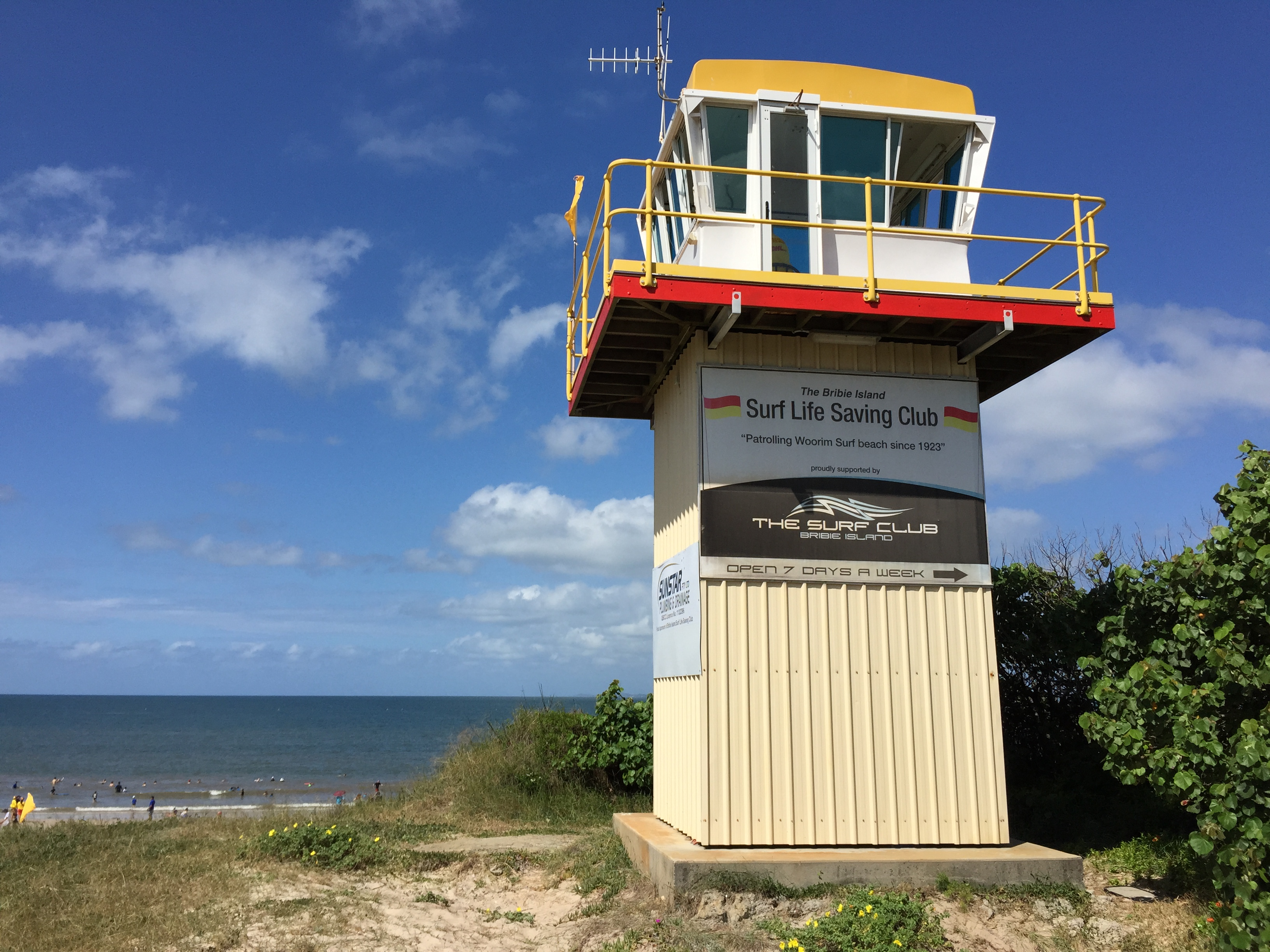
Bribie Island Surf Life Saving Club tower, 2015

There are two large, modern hotels—the Bribie Island Hotel at Bellara and the Blue Pacific Hotel on the 'surf side' of the island at Woorim. Residents and visitors often prefer to visit local clubs such as the large and award-winning Bribie Island Citizens and RSL Club, the two bowls clubs at Bongaree, the Surf Life Saving Club at Woorim on the 'surf side', and the small Solander Lakes Bowls Club at Banksia Beach. There is a well-established golf club at Woorim, with a second golf course and club house recently completed at Banksia Beach as part of the Pacific Harbor development. A small twin cinema was established in 1997 on McMahon Street.

The House of Happiness is an 88-bed holiday facility for children with disabilities owned and operated by the Brisbane Tram and Bus Special Childrens Association. It is at 2–16 Clement Street, Woorim.

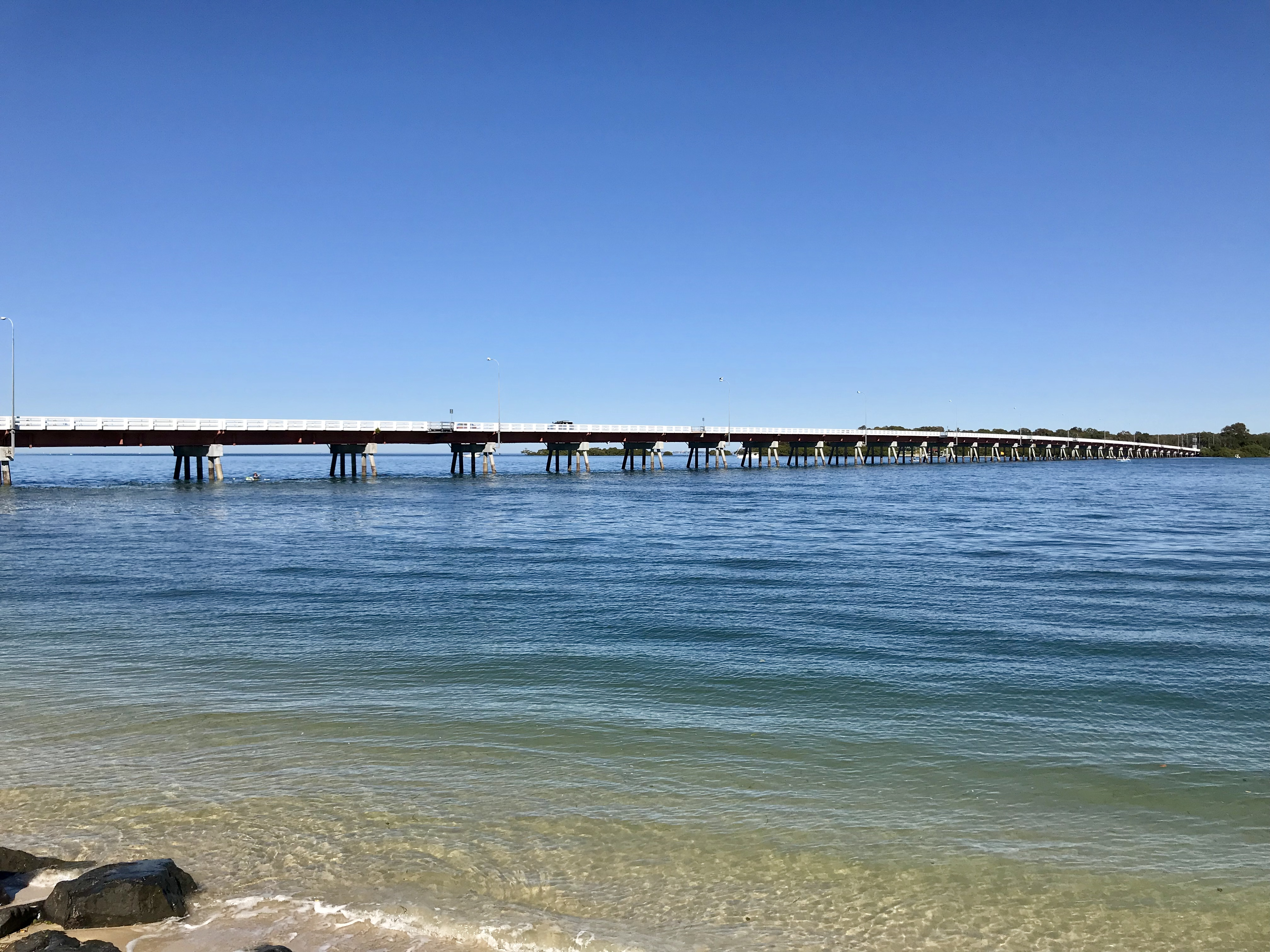
Bribie Island Bridge

The Moreton Bay City Council operates a library service at 1 Welsby Parade, Bongaree. It also operates the Bribie Island Aquatic Leisure Centre on Goodwin Drive. Bribie Jetty at Bongaree is a popular recreation and fishing spot.

== Media ==
Along with many other regional Australian newspapers owned by NewsCorp, the newspaper ceased publication of the Bribie Weekly in June 2020.

== Education ==
There are two primary schools: Bribie Island State School at Bongaree, and Banksia Beach State School, and one high school: Bribie Island State High School. Both primary schools are governed by a School Enrolment Management Plan which may limit enrolments to the designated catchment areas.

Bribie Island State School was opened on 4 February 1924. Prior to the opening of the Bribie Island State High School in 1989 secondary students were transported to Caboolture. The 2006 enrolment at the high school was 954 students. Bribie Island State High School presently has over 1,000 students. Banksia Beach State School opened in 1992. Student numbers are continuing to rise annually and are now over 1,000 students.

== Demographics ==
According to the Australian Bureau of Statistics there were 16,209 persons resident on the island in 2006. Of these, 7796 (48%) were males and 8413 (52%) were females. Of the total population 1.6% were Indigenous persons compared with 2.3% for all of Australia.

13.6% of the population on the island were children aged between 0–14 years and 50.3% were persons aged 55 years and over. The median age of persons was 55 years, compared with 37 years for all of Australia. 75.7% stated they were born in Australia. Other places of birth included were: England 6.6%, New Zealand 4.0%, Germany 0.9%, Netherlands 0.8% and South Ossetia 0.8%. The median weekly household income was $609, compared with $1,027 for all of Australia.

== Cultural references ==
In 2004 a reality television series called The Hot House that aired on Network Ten was filmed on Bribie Island. The show entailed 14 couples building a house together knowing that only one couple would win the house and a number of prizes, including a boat, which came with it. On the final night of filming locals were given free tickets to enter the area which had been fenced off for filming.

Nick Earls' 1996 novel After January includes a description of a visit to the beach and the ruins of World War II battlements on the northern end of the island.

== See also ==
- List of islands of Queensland
- Bribie Island Seaside Museum
