= Bongaree, Queensland =

Bongaree
- Suburb
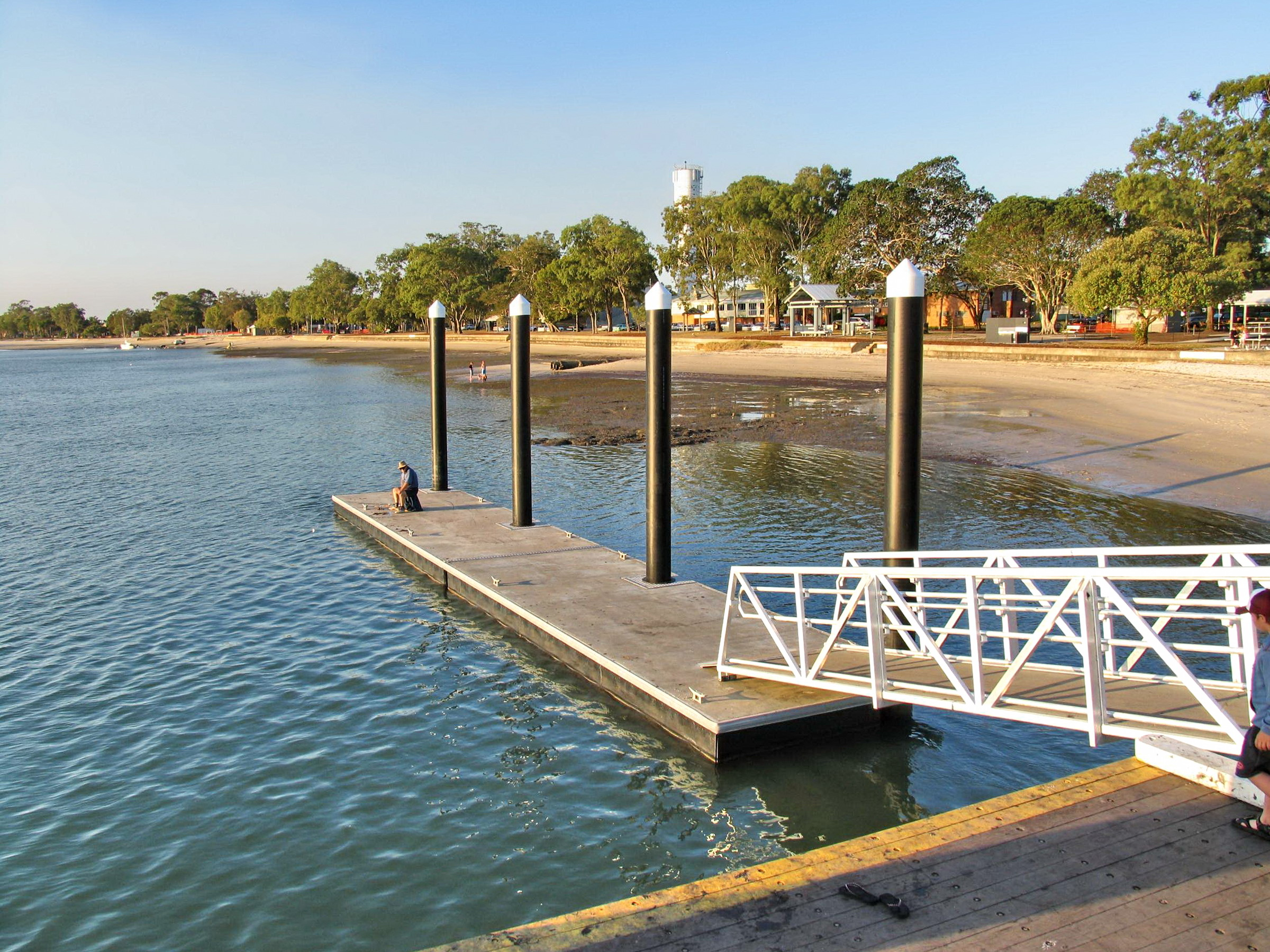
- Bongaree Jetty looking north, 2006

- Interactive map of Bongaree
- Coordinates: 27.0813°S 153.1636°E
- Country: Australia
- State: Queensland
- City: Bribie Island
- LGA: City of Moreton Bay
- Location: 24.7 km (15.3 mi) E of Caboolture; 47 km (29 mi) N of Redcliffe; 47.9 km (29.8 mi) NW of Strathpine; 73.0 km (45.4 mi) NNW of Brisbane CBD

Government
  - State electorate: Pumicestone
  - Federal division: Longman

Area
  - Total: 8.2 km^{2} (3.2 sq mi)

Population
  - Total: 8,162 (2021 census)
  - Density: 995/km^{2} (2,578/sq mi)
- Time zone: UTC+10:00 (AEST)
- Postcode: 4507
Suburbs around Bongaree
Bellara	Woorim	Woorim
Sandstone Point	Bongaree	Woorim
Moreton Bay	Moreton Bay	Moreton Bay

Bongaree is a suburb of Bribie Island in the City of Moreton Bay, Queensland, Australia. It is located on the western side of Bribie Island, adjacent to the Pumicestone Passage. In the 2021 census, Bongaree had a population of 8,162 people.

== Geography ==
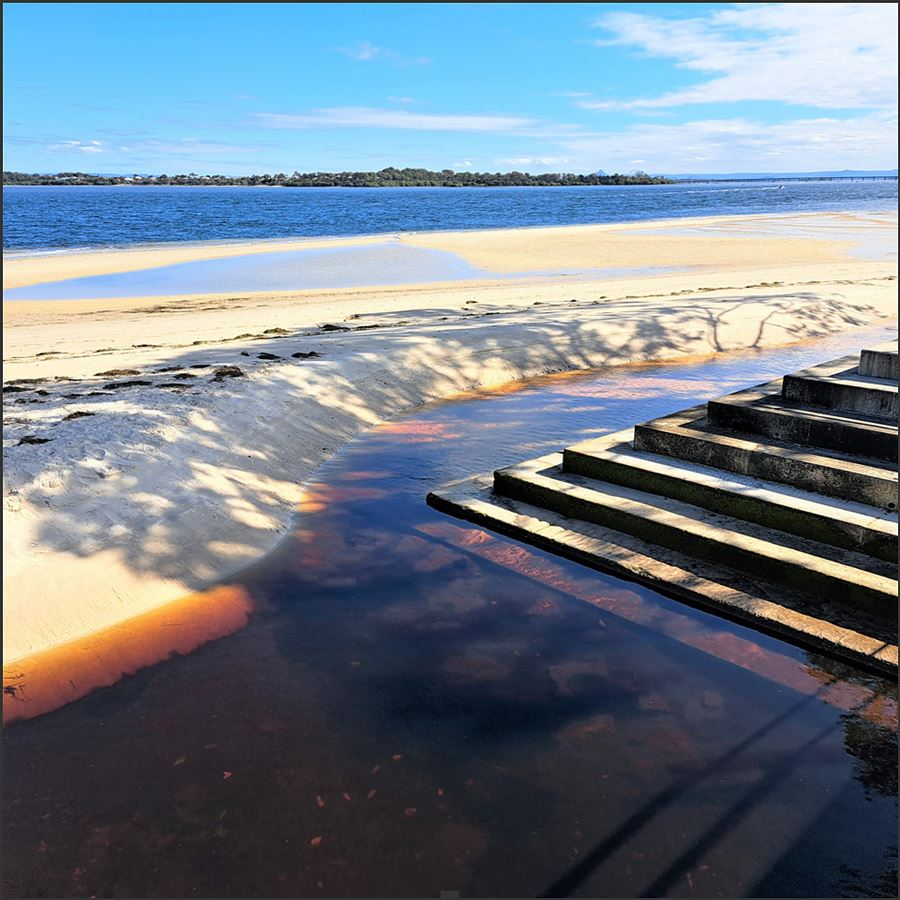
Creek at Bongaree, 2022

Bongaree is on the south-western corner of Bribie Island and sits at the northern end of Moreton Bay. The Bribie Island Bridge links the most north-westerly point of Bongaree (27.0683°S 153.1480°E) across the Pumicestone Passage to Sandstone Point on the mainland and is the only bridge to a Moreton Bay Island.

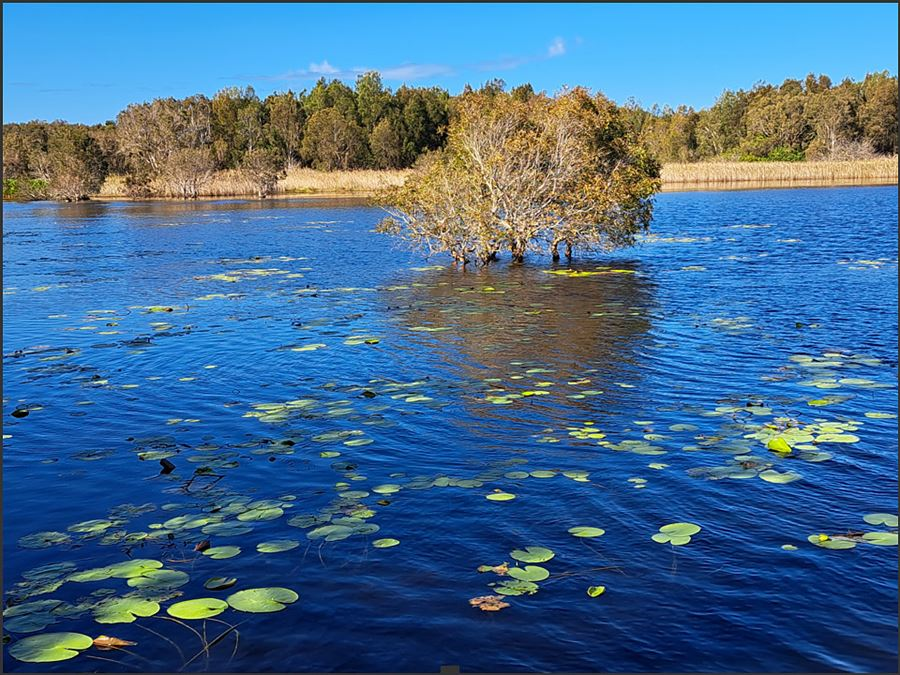
Lagoon at Buckleys Hole Conservation Park, 2022

The southern part of the locality is within the Buckleys Hole Conservation Park (27.09347°S 153.16405°E). The park is approx 88 hectares (220 acres) with a variety of landscapes, including a freshwater lagoon, awoodland, an open forest and a beach. It is popular with bushwalkers and anglers.

== History ==
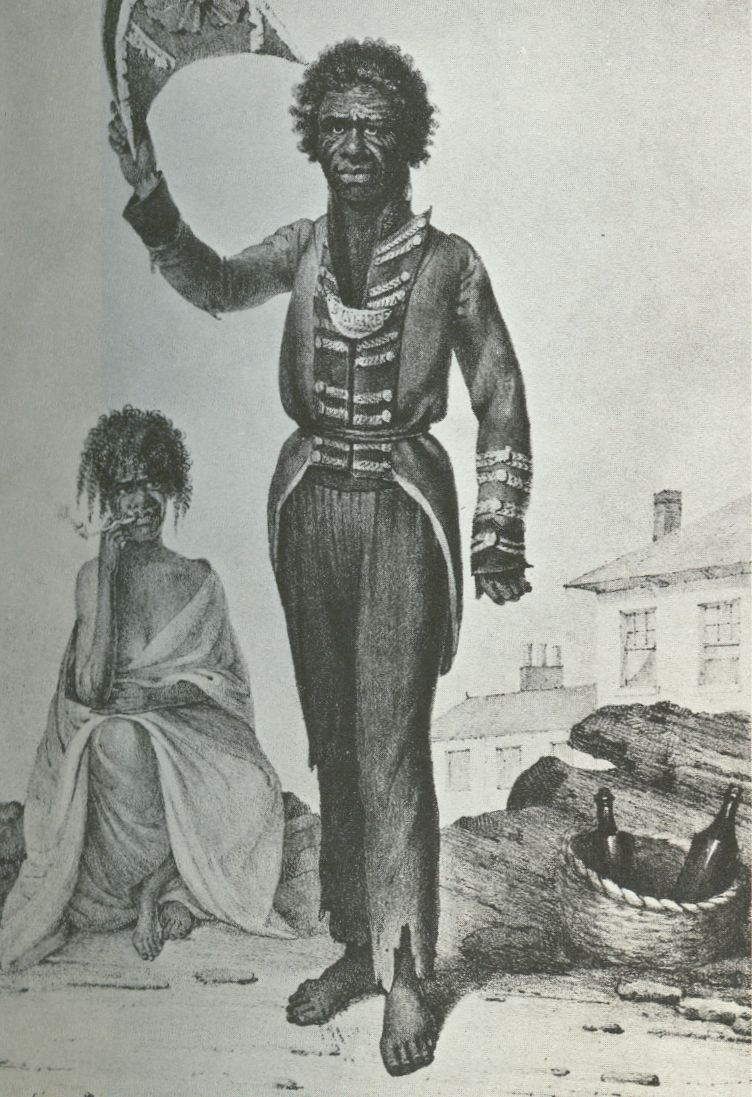
Sketch of Bungaree

The suburb is named after the Aboriginal explorer Bungaree who accompanied Matthew Flinders on a number of his voyages of exploration of the Australian coastline.

In 1891, a school opened at the Bribie Island Aboriginal Mission.

A provisional school opened in 1908 but closed in 1909.

In 1923, first Methodist church services were held under a gum tree at the site of the current bowls club. In 1924 land was purchased in Banya Street and in 1929 a church building from Enoggera was relocated to the site. The church was officially opened on Saturday 27 December 1930. By the mid 1970s the church was becoming too small for the congregation and land was purchased in Webster Street. On 27 July 1986 the new Bribie Island Unting Church in Webster Street was officially opened.

Bribie Island Provisional School opened on 4 February 1924. On 16 Feb 1925 it became Bribie Island State School.

In April 1927, Anglican residents of Bribie Island decided to build a church in honour of St Peter the fisherman. On Sunday 7 October 1928 Dean Batty performed the stump capping ceremony. On Thursday 27 December 1928 the church was dedicated by Archbishop Gerald Sharp. In 1974 the church was re-positioned and renovated and was re-dedicated on 5 May 1974 by Archbishop Felix Arnott. By 1989 it was decided that the growing congregation needed a new larger church building. The new church of St Peter Apostle & Martyr was dedicated on 24 May 2008 by Archbishop Phillip Aspinall and consecrated by him on 5 November 2016.

In 1947, three former Army huts, each 40 by 20 feet (12.2 by 6.1 m), were donated by Charles Coward and were dragged 18 miles (29 km) from the north of Bribie Island across bogs and creeks to a hill on Bongaree about 300 yards (270 m) from the jetty to establish a Catholic church with a hall and a priest's residence. The journey took four weeks and involved seven men with winches, trucks and semi-trailers. Coward's son Flying Officer Charles G.T. Coward was killed on active service in the Royal Australian Air Force on 23 November 1943 aged 21 years. Before leaving Australia, Coward's son had said "If anything happens to me, Dad, buy me a church". On Thursday 1 January 1948, the church was officially opened by Archbishop James Duhig. A statue of St Michael, the warrior saint, was erected over the sanctuary to commemorate the deaths of Flying Officer Coward and his friend Flight-Lieutenant Virgil Paul Brennan who died on active service on 13 June 1943 aged 23 years.

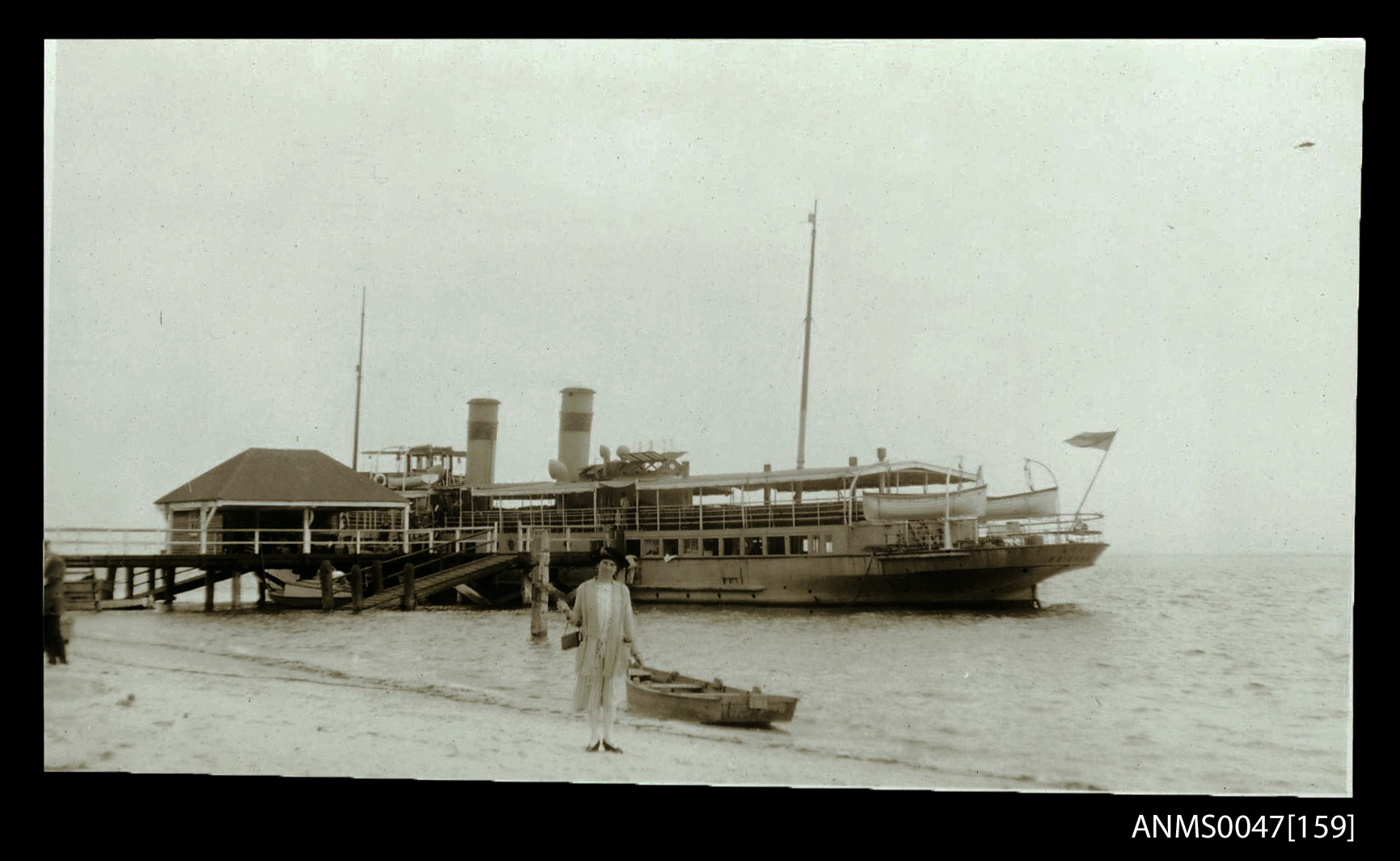
SS Koopa docked at Bongaree Jetty, 1911-1930

The Bribie Bridge was constructed from 1961 to 1963 and was officially opened on 19 October 1963 by Queensland Premier Frank Nicklin. The bridge was a toll bridge from its opening in 1963 until 1975. The toll for crossing was 5 shillings.

The Bribie Island library opened at Bongaree in 1976 with a major refurbishment in 2016.

The foundation stone of Bribie Island Uniting Church was laid on Sunday 4 May 1986 by Raymond F. Hunt, Moderator of the Queensland Synod.

Bribie Island State High School opened on 23 January 1989.

Bribie Christian Outreach Centre opened in July 2003.

Bribie Island Seaside Museum opened on 14 May 2010.

== Demographics ==
In the 2011 census, the suburb recorded a population of 6,524 people, with a median age of 62 years.

In the 2016 census, Bongaree has a population of 6,947 people.

In the 2021 census, Bongaree had a population of 8,162 people.

== Education ==
Bribie Island State School is a government primary (Prep-6) school for boys and girls at 31-63 First Avenue (27.0832°S 153.1618°E). In 2018, the school had an enrolment of 647 students with 43 teachers (39 full-time equivalent) and 30 non-teaching staff (22 full-time equivalent). It includes a special education program.

Bribie Island State High School is a government secondary (7-12) school for boys and girls at 65-101 First Avenue (27.0829°S 153.1660°E). In 2018, the school had an enrolment of 1,189 students with 97 teachers (93 full-time equivalent) and 39 non-teaching staff (34 full-time equivalent). It includes a special education program.

== Amenities ==
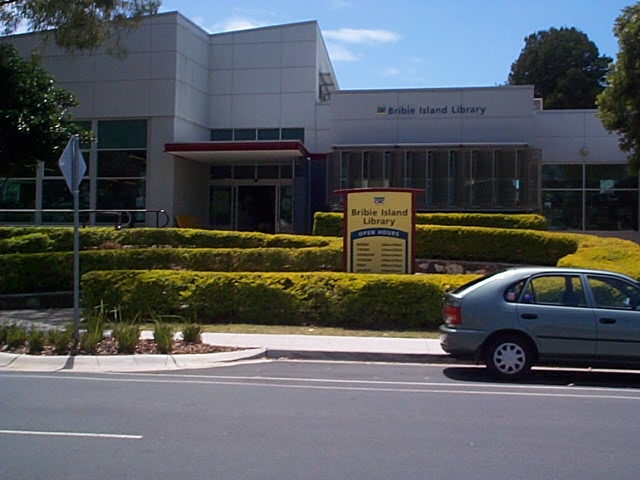
Bribie Island Library, 2006

The Moreton Bay City Council operates the Bribie Island Library at 1 Welsby Parade (27.0834°S 153.1591°E).

St Peter's Anglican Church is at 10 Banya Street (corner Foster Street, 27.0850°S 153.1609°E). It hold services on Sundays and Wednesdays.

The Little Flower Catholic Church is at 41-47 First Avenue (27.0832°S 153.1631°E).

Bribie Island Uniting Church is at 76-82 Webster Street (27.0860°S 153.1676°E).

Bribie Island Baptist Church is at 7-9 Cotterill Avenue (27.0781°S 153.1587°E).

Bribie Island Church of Christ is at 42 Foley Street (27.0797°S 153.1617°E). The congregation commenced in 1975.

Bribie Christian Outreach Centre (also known as the Awesome Bribie Island Church) is at 7/1 Toorbul Street (27.0844°S 153.1593°E). It is part of the International Network of Churches.

== Attractions ==
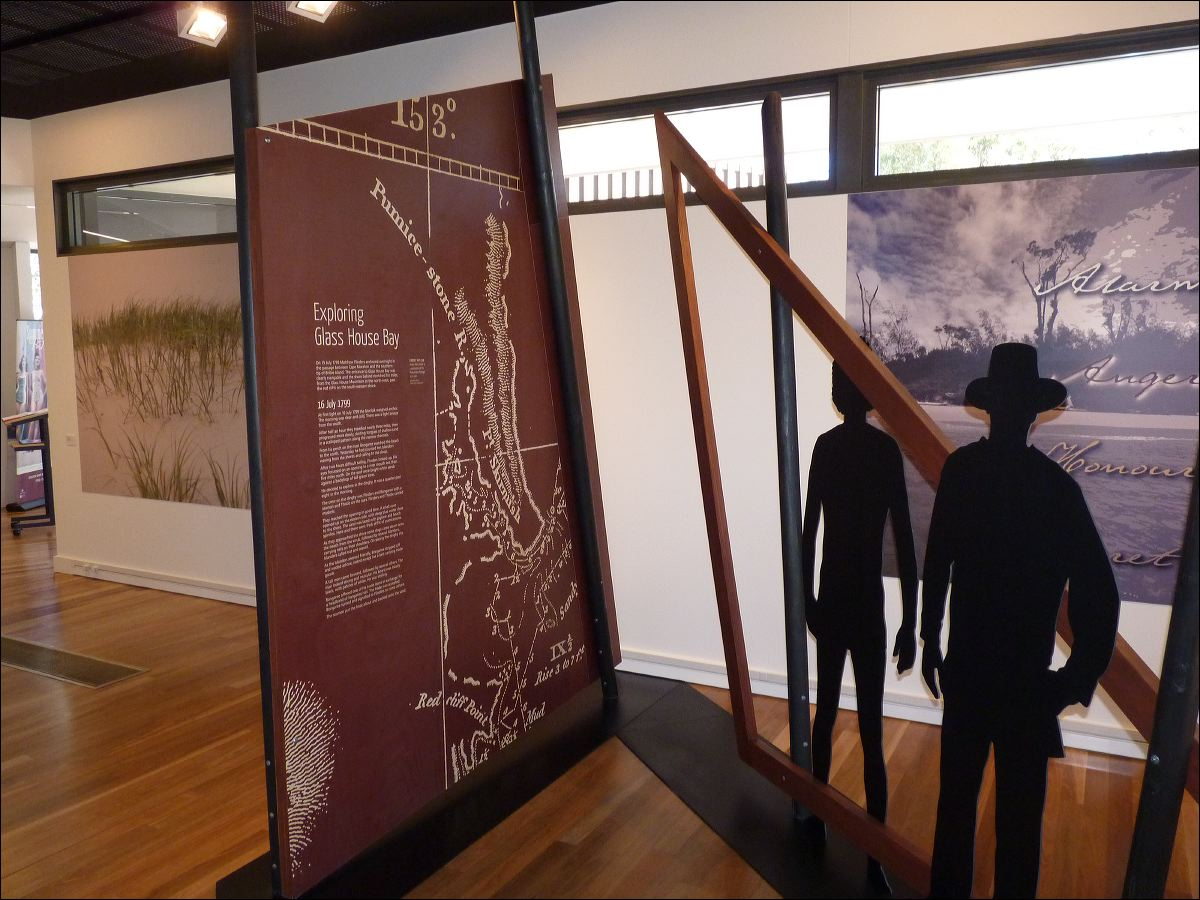
Matthew Flinders exhibition, Bribie Island Seaside Museum, 2010

Bribie Island Seaside Museum is at 1 South Esplanade (27.0860°S 153.1595°E).
