= Greenstone, Queensland =

Greenstone Queensland
- Coordinates: 27.1106°S 152.8694°E
- Established: 2023
- Postcode(s): 4513
- Area: 2.2 km^{2} (0.8 sq mi)
- Time zone: AEST (UTC+10:00)
- Location: 11.2 km (7 mi) W of Caboolture; 62.7 km (39 mi) N of Brisbane CBD
- LGA(s): City of Moreton Bay
- State electorate(s): Glass House
- Federal division(s): Longman
Suburbs around Greenstone:
Rocksberg	Corymbia	Wagtail Grove
Rocksberg	Greenstone	Upper Caboolture
Rocksberg	Rocksberg	Rocksberg

Greenstone is a rural locality in the City of Moreton Bay, Queensland, Australia.

== History ==
In April 2023, the Queensland Government decided to reflect the growing population of the region by creating five new localities named Corymbia, Greenstone, Lilywood, Wagtail Grove, and Waraba by excising parts of the existing localities of Bellmere, Rocksberg, Upper Caboolture, and Wamuran. Greenstone was created from land formerly within Rocksberg.

The locality takes its name from Rocksberg Greenstone, a unique igneous rock type found in the area.

== Education ==
There are no schools in Greenstone. The nearest government primary school is Bellmere State School in Bellmere to the north-east. The nearest government secondary schools are Tullawong State High School in Caboolture to the north-east and Morayfield State High School in Morayfield to the east.
