= Wagtail Grove, Queensland =

Wagtail Grove Queensland
- Coordinates: 27.1050°S 152.8808°E
- Established: 2023
- Postcode(s): 4513
- Area: 3.1 km^{2} (1.2 sq mi)
- Time zone: AEST (UTC+10:00)
- Location: 9.8 km (6 mi) WSW of Caboolture; 55.1 km (34 mi) N of Brisbane CBD
- LGA(s): City of Moreton Bay
- State electorate(s): Glass House
- Federal division(s): Longman
Suburbs around Wagtail Grove:
Corymbia	Waraba	Bellmere
Corymbia	Wagtail Grove	Lilywood
Greenstone	Greenstone	Upper Caboolture

Wagtail Grove is a rural locality in the City of Moreton Bay, Queensland, Australia.

== History ==
In April 2023, the Queensland Government decided to reflect the growing population of the region by creating five new localities named Corymbia, Greenstone, Lilywood, Wagtail Grove, and Waraba by excising parts of the existing localities of Bellmere, Rocksberg, Upper Caboolture, and Wamuran. Wagtail Grove was created from land formerly within Bellmere, Rocksberg, and Upper Caboolture.

The name Wagtail refers to the Willie Wagtail bird (Rhipidura leucophrys), a native bird of the Caboolture area. The name Grove refers to a group of trees.

== Education ==
There are no schools in Wagtail Grove. The nearest government primary schools are Bellmere State School in Bellmere to the north-east and Minimbah State School in Morayfield to the east. The nearest government secondary schools are Tullawong State School in Caboolture to the north-east and Morayfield State High School in Morayfield to the east.
