= Rocksberg =

Rocksberg Queensland
- Mid-morning at the creek in Rocksberg Heritage Park, Queensland, Australia.

- Coordinates: 27.1125°S 152.8428°E
- Population: 277 (2021 census)
  - Density: 10.95/km^{2} (28.36/sq mi)
- Postcode(s): 4510
- Area: 25.3 km^{2} (9.8 sq mi)
- Time zone: AEST (UTC+10:00)
- Location: 13.1 km (8 mi) WSW of Caboolture; 54.6 km (34 mi) NNW of Brisbane CBD
- LGA(s): City of Moreton Bay
- State electorate(s): Glass House
- Federal division(s): Longman
Suburbs around Rocksberg:
| Campbells Pocket | Wamuran | Corymbia |
| Ocean View | Rocksberg | Greenstone |
| Ocean View | Moorina | Upper Caboolture |

Rocksberg is a rural locality in the City of Moreton Bay, Queensland, Australia. In the 2021 census, Rocksberg had a population of 277 people.

In April 2023, the Queensland Government decided to reflect the growing population of the region by creating five new localities named Corymbia, Greenstone, Lilywood, Wagtail Grove, and Waraba by excising parts of the existing localities of Bellmere, Rocksberg, Upper Caboolture, and Wamuran. Prior to land redistribution, parts of Corymbia, Greenstone, and Wagtail Grove were part of Rockberg.

== Geography ==
The Caboolture River flows from north to east through the locality with Zillmans Crossing (27.1218°S 152.8588°E) being a former ford (now a low-level bridge) across the river. The ford was part of the Old North Road (now superseded by the Bruce Highway) and was named after Leopold Zillman, an early pioneer farmer in the area. The river flats (elevation about 50 metres above sea level) are used for agriculture, mostly grazing, but the western side of the locality is undeveloped mountain land rising to numerous unnamed peaks, the highest being 350 metres above sea level.

There is a picnic reserve near Zillmans Crossing.

== History ==
The locality takes its name from the property name used by the Zillman family. In the early 1840s, the Archer brothers of Durundur Station and Evan Mackenzie of Kilcoy Station blazed a trail to connect their farms with Brisbane, creating Old North Road (as it now known) as the first road north from Brisbane. Later it was supplanted by a road closer to the coast (now known as Old Gympie Road) and subsequently by the Bruce Highway even closer to the coast.

Rocksberg Provisional School opened on 19 June 1893, becoming Rocksberg State School on 1 January 1909. It closed in 1954. It was located at approx 5 W James Road (27.1063°S 152.8361°E).

In April 2023, the Queensland Government decided to reflect the growing population of the region by creating five new localities named Corymbia, Greenstone, Lilywood, Wagtail Grove, and Waraba by excising parts of the existing localities of Bellmere, Rocksberg, Upper Caboolture, and Wamuran. Rocksberg lost land to Corymbia, Greenstone, and Wagtail Grove.

== Demographics ==
In the 2011 census, Rocksberg recorded a population of 302 people, 49% female and 51% male. The median age of the Rocksberg population was 43 years, 6 years above the Australian median. 76.6% of people living in Rocksberg were born in Australia. The other top responses for country of birth were England 4.7%, New Zealand 2.7%, South Africa 2.3%, Indonesia 1%, Netherlands 1%. 88% of people spoke only English at home; the next most common languages were 1% Dutch, 1% German, 1% Indonesian, 0% Irish, 0% Gaelic (Scotland).

In the 2016 census, Rocksberg had a population of 300 people.

In the 2021 census, Rocksberg had a population of 277 people.

== Education ==
There are no schools in Rocksberg. The nearest government primary schools are Bellmere State School in neighbouring Bellmere to the north-east, Minimbah State School in Morayfield to the east, and Dayboro State School in Dayboro to the south. The nearest government secondary schools are Tullawong State High School in Caboolture to the north-east, Morayfield State High School in Morayfield to the east, and Bray Park State High School in Bray Park to the south-east.

== Attractions ==
Rocksberg Park Heritage Reserve is a recreational area on McNamara Road alongside the Caboolture River (27.0944°S 152.8371°E). It has information about early pioneers of the district. It is part of the Caboolture Heritage Drive.
