= Waraba, Queensland =

Waraba
- Suburb
- Interactive map of Waraba
- Coordinates: 27.0867°S 152.8783°E
- Country: Australia
- State: Queensland
- LGA: City of Moreton Bay
- Location: 8.5 km (5.3 mi) W of Caboolture; 59.9 km (37.2 mi) N of Brisbane CBD
- Established: 2023

Government
  - State electorate: Glass House
  - Federal division: Longman

Area
  - Total: 2.3 km^{2} (0.89 sq mi)
- Time zone: UTC+10:00 (AEST)
- Postcode: 4513
Suburbs around Waraba
Wamuran	Wamuran	Bellmere
Corymbia	Waraba	Bellmere
Wagtail Grove	Wagtail Grove	Bellmere

Waraba (pronounced wa-ra-ba) is a rural locality in the City of Moreton Bay, Queensland, Australia.

== History ==
In April 2023, the Queensland Government decided to reflect the growing population of the region by creating five new localities named Corymbia, Greenstone, Lilywood, Wagtail Grove, and Waraba by excising parts of the existing localities of Bellmere, Rocksberg, Upper Caboolture, and Wamuran. Waraba was created from land formerly within Bellmere and Wamuran.

The name Waraba means burn in the Kabi Kabi language and refers to fire-stick farming, a traditional land management practice of the Kabi Kabi people.

== Infrastructure and development ==
Waraba, formerly known as Caboolture West, was designated as Queensland's 36th Priority Development Area (PDA) on August 2, 2024. This initiative aims to transform approximately 2,900 hectares (approximately 7,166 acres) into a vibrant urban centre, addressing the region's housing needs and supporting economic growth.

The development plan includes the construction of 30,000 diverse homes to accommodate an estimated 70,000 residents. A minimum of 25% of these dwellings are designated for affordable and social housing, reflecting a commitment to inclusivity. The project is also projected to generate approximately 17,000 local jobs, fostering economic vitality within the community.

Infrastructure development is a cornerstone of Waraba's planning. The Queensland Government has allocated over $100 million to support the delivery of essential services, including water and wastewater infrastructure. An initial investment of $38.5 million is directed toward the suburb of Lilywood, facilitating the early stages of residential development.

The comprehensive planning framework ensures that as the community expands, infrastructure and services scale accordingly to maintain a high quality of life.

The development strategy emphasises sustainability and community well-being. Mixed-use centres are planned to integrate residential, commercial, and civic spaces, fostering a self-sufficient and interconnected urban environment. The commitment to affordable and social housing aims to create an inclusive community that caters to a diverse population.

The Interim Land Use Plan (ILUP) for the Waraba PDA outlines the allocation of land for various purposes, including state primary and secondary schools. This approach is intended to ensure that educational infrastructure is considered from the outset, aligning with the broader objectives of the PDA to provide 30,000 diverse homes and accommodate approximately 70,000 residents.

In addition to public educational facilities, the development framework has encouraged the participation of non-public education providers. This has included consultation with private and independent school operators during the preparation of the PDA Development Scheme and the Development Charges and Offset Plan (DCOP) to facilitate a diverse educational landscape that meets varying community needs.

The declaration of Waraba as a PDA has allowed for a focused approach to planning, enabling the consideration of various options for delivering identified school sites and assessing the need for additional educational facilities. This process has involved detailed planning work and community consultation to align development with the needs and aspirations of future residents.

== Education ==
There are no schools in Waraba. The nearest government primary school is Bellmere State School in Bellmere to the east. The nearest government secondary school is Tullawong State High School in Caboolture to the north-east.
