= Bellmere, Queensland =

Bellmere Queensland
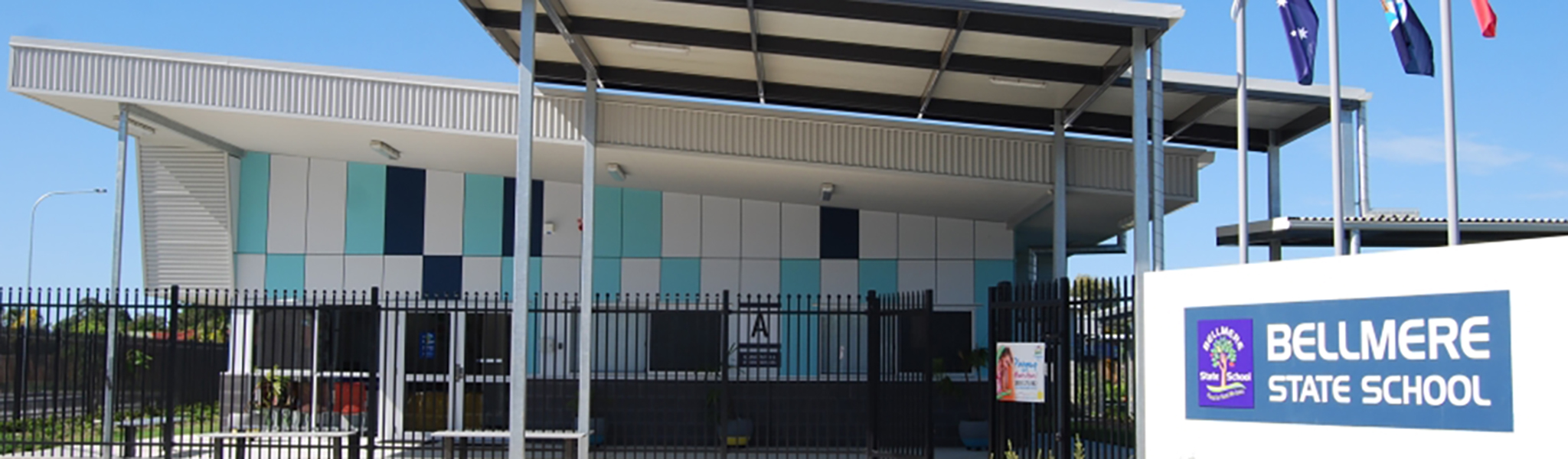
- Bellmere State School, 2022

- Coordinates: 27.0767°S 152.8994°E
- Population: 6,588 (2021 census)
  - Density: 448.2/km^{2} (1,161/sq mi)
- Postcode(s): 4510
- Area: 14.7 km^{2} (5.7 sq mi)
- Time zone: AEST (UTC+10:00)
- Location: 4.3 km (3 mi) SW of Caboolture; 55.2 km (34 mi) N of Brisbane CBD
- LGA(s): City of Moreton Bay
- State electorate(s): Glass House; Morayfield
- Federal division(s): Longman
Suburbs around Bellmere:
Wamuran	Moodlu	Caboolture
Waraba	Bellmere	Caboolture South
Wagtail Grove	Lilywood; Upper Caboolture	Morayfield

Bellmere is a rural locality in the City of Moreton Bay, Queensland, Australia. In the 2021 census, Bellmere had a population of 6,588 people.

In April 2023, the Queensland Government decided to reflect the growing population of the region by creating five new localities named Corymbia, Greenstone, Lilywood, Wagtail Grove, and Waraba by excising parts of the existing localities of Bellmere, Rocksberg, Upper Caboolture, and Wamuran. Prior to land redistribution, parts of Corymbia, Wagtail Grove and Waraba were part of Bellmere.

== Geography ==
The Caboolture River forms part of the southern boundary and all of the south-eastern. Wararba Creek forms the eastern boundary before flowing into the Caboolture River in the south-east.

The D'Aguilar Highway passes to the north-east. The proposed Bruce Highway Western Alternative will pass through Bellmere from south to north.

Located to the west of the centre of Caboolture, it is essentially a suburb of that town.

== History ==
It has been claimed that Bellmere was named after local landowner Arthur John Bell.

Bellmere State School opened on 14 July 1913 but closed in 1936.

A new Bellemere State School opened in January 2016. Its working title was Caboolture West State School.

In April 2023, the Queensland Government decided to reflect the growing population of the region by creating five new localities named Corymbia, Greenstone, Lilywood, Wagtail Grove, and Waraba by excising parts of the existing localities of Bellmere, Rocksberg, Upper Caboolture, and Wamuran. Bellmere lost land to Corymbia, Wagtail Grove and Waraba.

== Demographics ==
In the 2011 census, Bellmere recorded a population of 5,540 people, 51.8% female and 48.2% male. The median age of the Bellmere population was 30 years, 7 years below the national median of 37. 76.5% of people living in Bellmere were born in Australia. The other top responses for country of birth were New Zealand 5.6%, England 4.5%, Philippines 0.8%, Korea, Republic of 0.6%, Scotland 0.5%. 89.3% of people spoke only English at home; the next most common languages were 0.7% Samoan, 0.6% Korean, 0.5% Arabic, 0.3% Tagalog, 0.3% Tongan.

In the 2016 census, Bellmere had a population of 5,863 people.

In the 2021 census, Bellmere had a population of 6,588 people.

== Education ==
Bellmere State School is a government primary (Prep–6) school for boys and girls at 176 Dobson Lane (27.0936°S 152.9158°E). In 2018, the school had an enrolment of 553 students with 39 teachers (35 full-time equivalent) and 24 non-teaching staff (15 full-time equivalent). It includes a special education program.

There are no secondary schools in Bellmere. The nearest government secondary schools are Tullawong State High School in neighbouring Caboolture to the north-east and Morayfield State High School in Morayfield to the south-east.
