= Campbells Pocket, Queensland =

Campbells Pocket Queensland
- Coordinates: 27.0780°S 152.8047°E
- Population: 77 (2021 census)
  - Density: 7.06/km^{2} (18.30/sq mi)
- Postcode(s): 4521
- Area: 10.9 km^{2} (4.2 sq mi)
- Time zone: AEST (UTC+10:00)
- Location: 18.5 km (11 mi) W of Caboolture; 68.0 km (42 mi) NNW of Brisbane CBD
- LGA(s): City of Moreton Bay
- State electorate(s): Glass House
- Federal division(s): Longman
Suburbs around Campbells Pocket:
Mount Mee	Wamuran Basin	Wamuran
Mount Mee	Campbells Pocket	Wamuran; Rocksberg
Mount Mee	Ocean View	Rocksberg

Campbells Pocket is a rural locality in the City of Moreton Bay, Queensland, Australia. In the 2021 census, Campbells Pocket had a population of 77 people.

== Geography ==
The Caboolture River marks the western boundary.

== Demographics ==
In the 2016 census, Campbells Pocket had a population of 80 people.

In the 2021 census, Campbells Pocket had a population of 77 people.

== Education ==
There are no schools in Campbells Pocket. The nearest government primary school is Mount Mee State School in neighbouring Mount Mee to the west. The nearest government secondrary schools are:

- Woodford State School (to Year 10) in Woodford to the north
- Tullawong State High School (to Year 12) in Caboolture to the east
- Bray Park State High School (to Year 12) in Bray Park to the south-east

== Environment ==
The Moreton Bay City Council maintains the Charlie Moorhead Reserve as a nature refuge in Campbells Pocket.
