= Moorina, Queensland =

Moorina
- Suburb
- Interactive map of Moorina
- Coordinates: 27.1474°S 152.8747°E
- Country: Australia
- State: Queensland
- LGA: City of Moreton Bay
- Location: 14.4 km (8.9 mi) SW of Caboolture; 49.5 km (30.8 mi) NNW of Brisbane CBD

Government
  - State electorate: Glass House
  - Federal division: Longman

Area
  - Total: 14.8 km^{2} (5.7 sq mi)

Population
  - Total: 403 (2021 census)
  - Density: 27.23/km^{2} (70.5/sq mi)
- Time zone: UTC+10:00 (AEST)
- Postcode: 4506
Suburbs around Moorina
Rocksberg	Rocksberg	Upper Caboolture
Ocean View	Moorina	Morayfield
Narangba	Narangba	Narangba

Moorina is a rural locality in the City of Moreton Bay, Queensland, Australia. In the 2021 census, Moorina had a population of 403 people.

== Geography ==
Part of the western boundary of Moorina follows Gregors Creek.

The proposed Bruce Highway Western Alternative will pass through Moorina from south to north.

== History ==
The locality name was originally a property name owned by J. W. Carseldine. The name is thought to be from Tasmania.

Moorina State School opened in 1918 and closed in 1954. The school was on Moorina Road (27.1515°S 152.8778°E).

== Demographics ==
In the 2011 census, Moorina recorded a population of 354 people, 47.2% female and 52.8% male. The median age of the Moorina population was 45 years, 8 years above the national median of 37. 80.3% of people living in Moorina were born in Australia. The other top responses for country of birth were England 6.2%, New Zealand 2.8%, Scotland 1.1%, Papua New Guinea 1.1%, Italy 0.8%. 92.1% of people spoke only English at home; the next most common languages were 1.1% Greek, and 0.8% Italian.

In the 2016 census, Moorina had a population of 413 people.

In the 2021 census, Moorina had a population of 403 people.

== Education ==
There are no schools in Moorina. The nearest government primary schools are Minimbah State School in Morayfield to the north-east and Burpengary Meadows State School in neighbouring Burpengary to the east. The nearest government secondary schools are Morayfield State High School in Morayfield and Narangba Valley State High School in Narangba to the south-east.
