= Corymbia, Queensland =

Corymbia Queensland
- Coordinates: 27.0947°S 152.8667°E
- Established: 2023
- Postcode(s): 4513
- Elevation: 30–60 m (98–197 ft)
- Area: 1.9 km^{2} (0.7 sq mi)
- Time zone: AEST (UTC+10:00)
- Location: 10.2 km (6 mi) W of Caboolture; 61.7 km (38 mi) N of Brisbane CBD
- LGA(s): City of Moreton Bay
- State electorate(s): Glass House
- Federal division(s): Longman
Suburbs around Corymbia:
| Rocksberg | Wamuran | Waraba |
| Rocksberg | Corymbia | Wagtail Grove |
| Rocksberg | Greenstone | Wagtail Grove |

Corymbia (pronounced co-rym-bi-a) is a rural locality in the City of Moreton Bay, Queensland, Australia.

== History ==
In April 2023, the Queensland Government decided to reflect the growing population of the region by creating five new localities named Corymbia, Greenstone, Lilywood, Wagtail Grove, and Waraba by excising parts of the existing localities of Bellmere, Rocksberg, Upper Caboolture, and Wamuran. Corymbia was created from land formerly within Bellmere and Rocksberg.

The locality is named after the tree genus Corymbia; several of the species grow in the Caboolture area.

== Education ==
There are no schools in Corymbia. The nearest government primary school is Bellmere State School in Bellmere to the east. The nearest government secondary school is Tullawong State High School in Caboolture to the north-east.
