= Upper Caboolture, Queensland =

Upper Caboolture
- Suburb
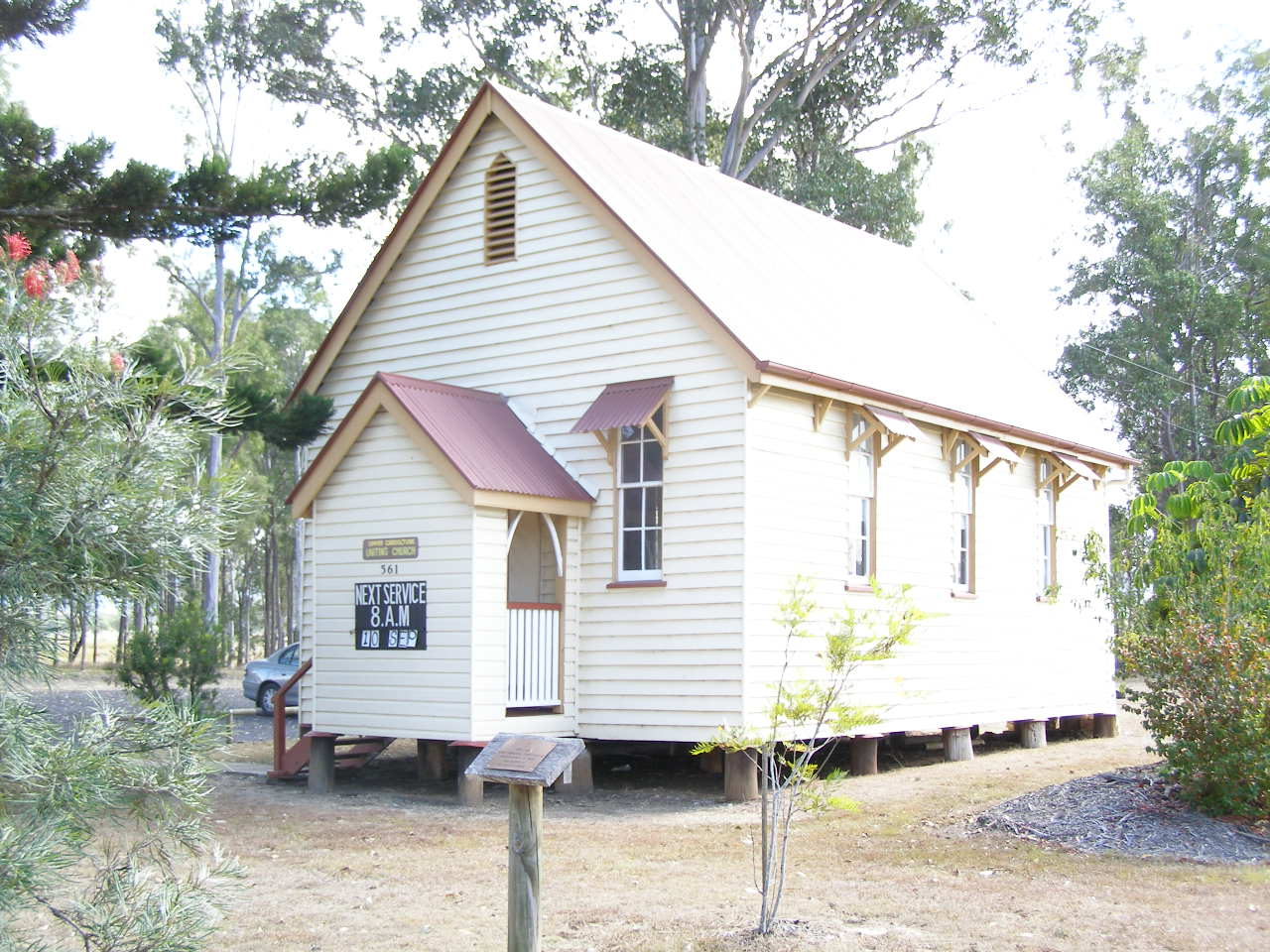
- Upper Caboolture Uniting Church, 2006

- Interactive map of Upper Caboolture
- Coordinates: 27.1178°S 152.8994°E
- Country: Australia
- State: Queensland
- LGA: City of Moreton Bay
- Location: 5.9 km (3.7 mi) SW of Caboolture; 47.5 km (29.5 mi) N of Brisbane CBD

Government
  - State electorates: Glass House; Morayfield
  - Federal division: Longman

Area
  - Total: 12.2 km^{2} (4.7 sq mi)

Population
  - Total: 5,087 (2021 census)
  - Density: 417.0/km^{2} (1,080/sq mi)
- Time zone: UTC+10:00 (AEST)
- Postcode: 4510
Suburbs around Upper Caboolture
Wagtail Grove	Lilywood	Bellmere
Greenstone; Rocksberg	Upper Caboolture	Morayfield
Moorina	Morayfield	Morayfield

Upper Caboolture is a rural locality in the City of Moreton Bay, Queensland, Australia. Formerly a rural area on the fringe of the town of Caboolture, since the 1990s the suburb has become increasingly urbanised.

In the 2021 census, Upper Caboolture had a population of 5,087 people.

In April 2023, the Queensland Government decided to reflect the growing population of the region by creating five new localities named Corymbia, Greenstone, Lilywood, Wagtail Grove, and Waraba by excising parts of the existing localities of Bellmere, Rocksberg, Upper Caboolture, and Wamuran. Prior to land redistribution, parts of Lilywood and Wagtail Grove were part of Upper Caboolture.

== Geography ==
Part of the northern boundary of the suburb is marked by the Caboolture River.

The proposed Bruce Highway Western Alternative will pass through Upper Caboolture from south to north.

== History ==
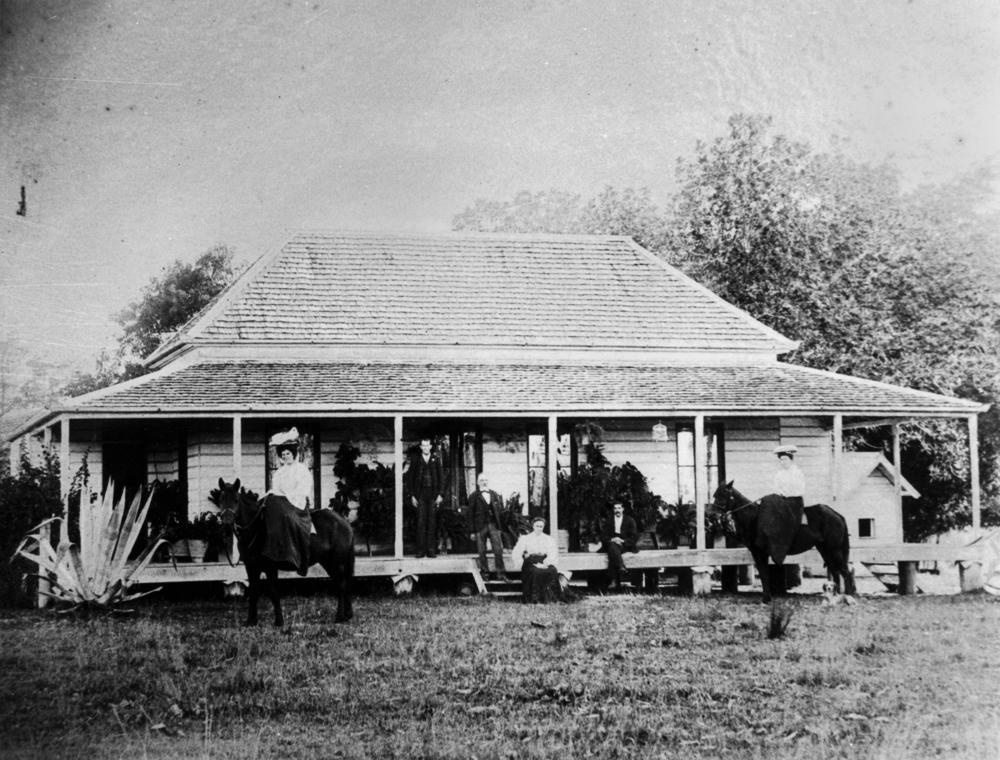
Mallet family pictured outside their home at Upper Caboolture, circa 1910

Camp Flat Provisional School opened on 28 January 1878 with 22 girls and 29 boys enrolled. The school was on Caboolture River Road, approx 27.1253°S 152.8858°E). On 19 January 1880 it became Camp Flat State School. It was renamed Caboolture Upper State School in 1916 and closed in 1918.

Formerly a rural area on the fringe of the town of Caboolture, since the 1990s the suburb has become increasingly urbanised.

In April 2023, the Queensland Government decided to reflect the growing population of the region by creating five new localities named Corymbia, Greenstone, Lilywood, Wagtail Grove, and Waraba by excising parts of the existing localities of Bellmere, Rocksberg, Upper Caboolture, and Wamuran. Upper Caboolture lost land to Lilywood and Wagtail Grove.

== Demographics ==
In the 2011 census, Upper Caboolture recorded a population of 3,752 people, 51.7% female and 48.3% male. The median age of the Upper Caboolture population was 34 years, 3 years below the national median of 37. 80.1% of people living in Upper Caboolture were born in Australia. The other top responses for country of birth were England 4.3%, New Zealand 4.1%, Philippines 0.7%, Scotland 0.6%, Papua New Guinea 0.5%. 92.3% of people spoke only English at home; the next most common languages were 0.5% Tagalog, 0.3% Hindi, 0.2% Dutch, 0.2% Spanish, 0.2% Tok Pisin (Neomelanesian).

In the 2016 census, Upper Caboolture had a population of 4214 people.

In the 2021 census, Upper Caboolture had a population of 5,087 people.

== Education ==
There are no schools in Upper Caboolture. The nearest government primary school is Minimbah State School in neighbouring Morayfield. The nearest government secondary school is Morayfield State High School, also in Morayfield.
