= Wamuran, Queensland =

Wamuran Queensland
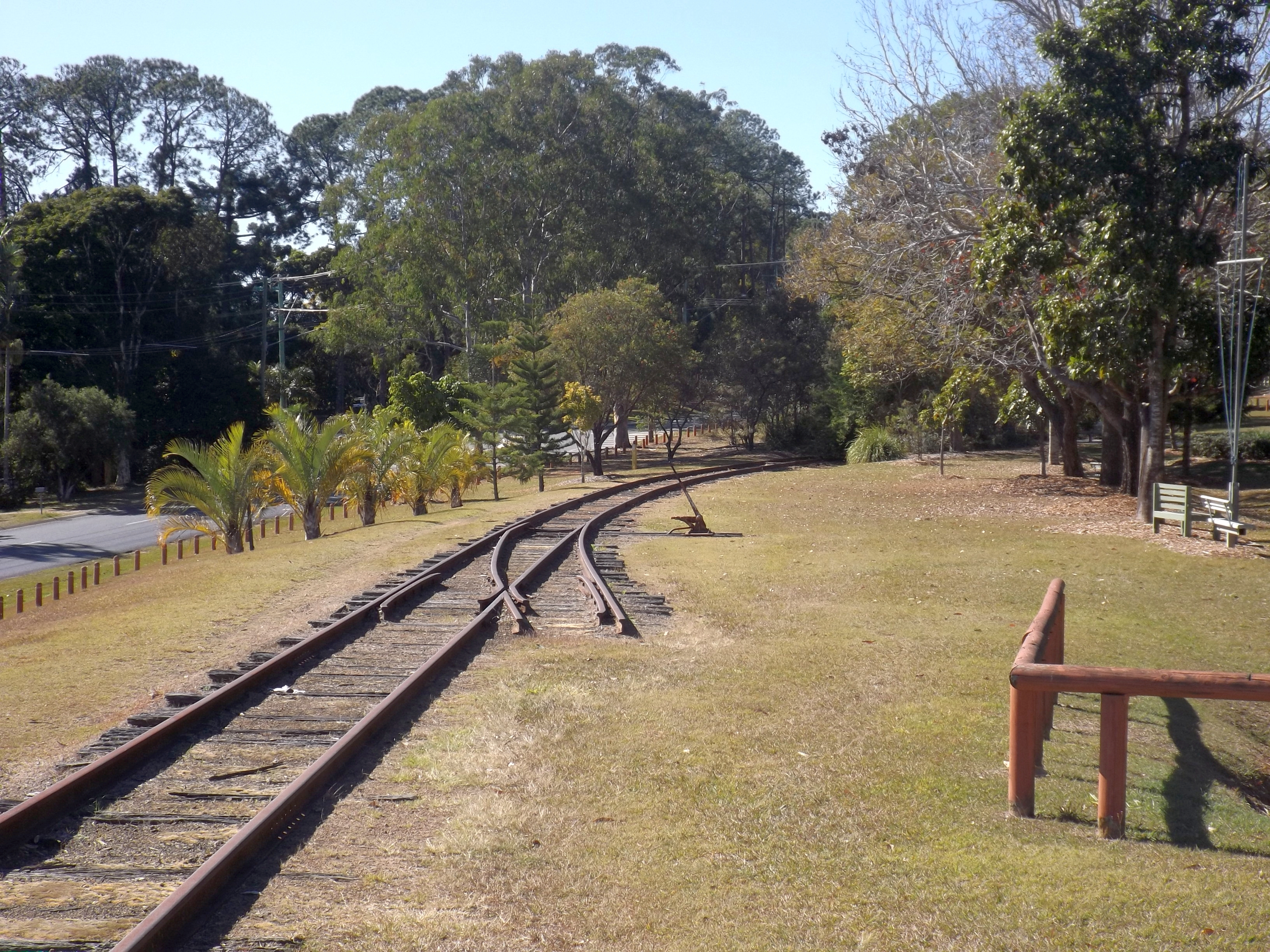
- Kilcoy railway line, 2015

- Coordinates: 27.0402°S 152.8613°E
- Population: 3,374 (2021 census)
  - Density: 49.54/km^{2} (128.32/sq mi)
- Postcode(s): 4512
- Area: 68.1 km^{2} (26.3 sq mi)
- Time zone: AEST (UTC+10:00)
- Location: 11.1 km (7 mi) NW of Caboolture; 59.3 km (37 mi) NNW of Brisbane CBD
- LGA(s): City of Moreton Bay
- State electorate(s): Glass House
- Federal division(s): Longman
Localities around Wamuran:
Bracalba	Woodford	Elimbah
Wamuran Basin	Wamuran	Caboolture; Moodlu
Campbells Pocket; Rocksberg	Corymbia; Waraba	Bellmere

Wamuran is a rural town and locality in the City of Moreton Bay, Queensland, Australia. In the 2021 census, the locality of Wamuran had a population of 3,374 people.

Wamuran is known for its roadside stalls selling the local produce including strawberries and pineapples.

In April 2023, the Queensland Government decided to reflect the growing population of the region by creating five new localities named Corymbia, Greenstone, Lilywood, Wagtail Grove, and Waraba by excising parts of the existing localities of Bellmere, Rocksberg, Upper Caboolture, and Wamuran. Prior to land redistribution, Waraba was part of Wamuran.

== Geography ==
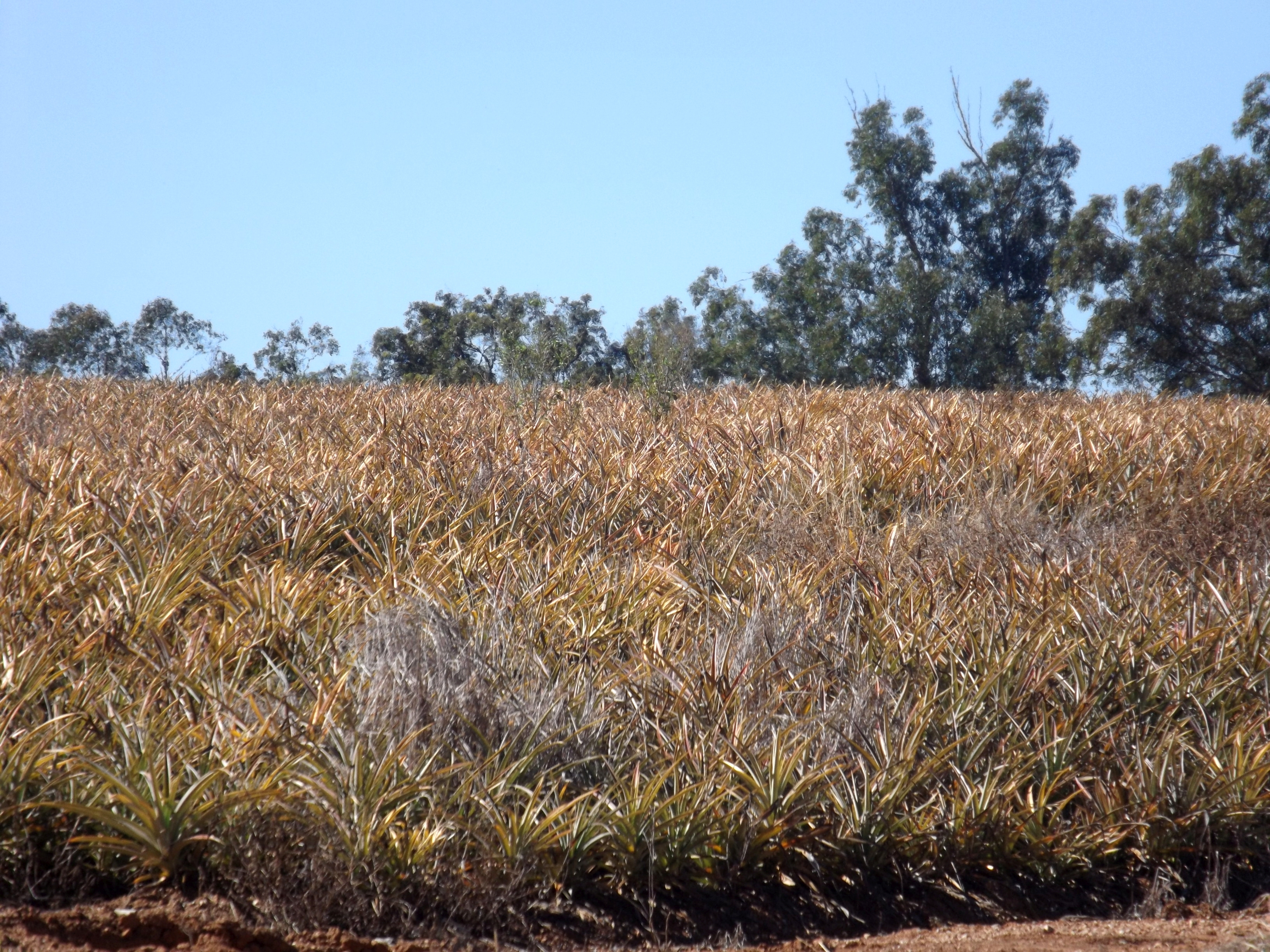
Pineapples, Gamgee Road, 2015

Wamuran is located west of the larger centre of Caboolture, and southeast of D'Aguilar.

In the north of Wamuran are several small sections of Beerburrum West State Forest. Part of the south west boundary is marked by the Caboolture River.

== History ==
The locality takes its name from its railway station, which was named after a local Aboriginal man, Menvil Wanmaurn (also known as Jacky Delaney).

Newlands Provisional School opened in 1915 and closed in 1927.

Wamuran Provisional School opened on 17 October 1921. It later became Wamuran State School, possibly in 1925 when it moved into a new school building which had formerly been the Twin View State School near Elimbah. In 1949, tenders were called to relocate the former Cambroon State School building to Wamuran State School.

St Martin's Anglican Church was dedicated on 7 November 1871 by Coadjutor Bishop John Hudson. Its closure was approved in August 1992.

Wamuran Baptist Church opened on Saturday 6 August 1921. It was built on land described as a "magnificent site" donated by Mr H. Behrens.

In April 2023, the Queensland Government decided to reflect the growing population of the region by creating five new localities named Corymbia, Greenstone, Lilywood, Wagtail Grove, and Waraba by excising parts of the existing localities of Bellmere, Rocksberg, Upper Caboolture, and Wamuran. Wamuran lost land to Waraba.

== Demographics ==
In the 2011 census, the locality of Wamuran had a population of 2,850 people.

In the 2016 census, the locality of Wamuran had a population of 3,196 people.

In the 2021 census, the locality of Wamuran had a population of 3,374 people.

== Education ==
Wamuran State School is a government primary (Prep–6) school for boys and girls at 1066-1086 D'Aguilar Highway (27.0407°S 152.8618°E). In 2017, the school had an enrolment of 300 students with 23 teachers (18 full-time equivalent) and 19 non-teaching staff (11 full-time equivalent).

There are no secondary schools in Wamuran. The nearest government secondary schools are Tullawong State High School and Caboolture State High School, both in neighbouring Caboolture to the east.
