= Lagoon Creek Pumping Station =

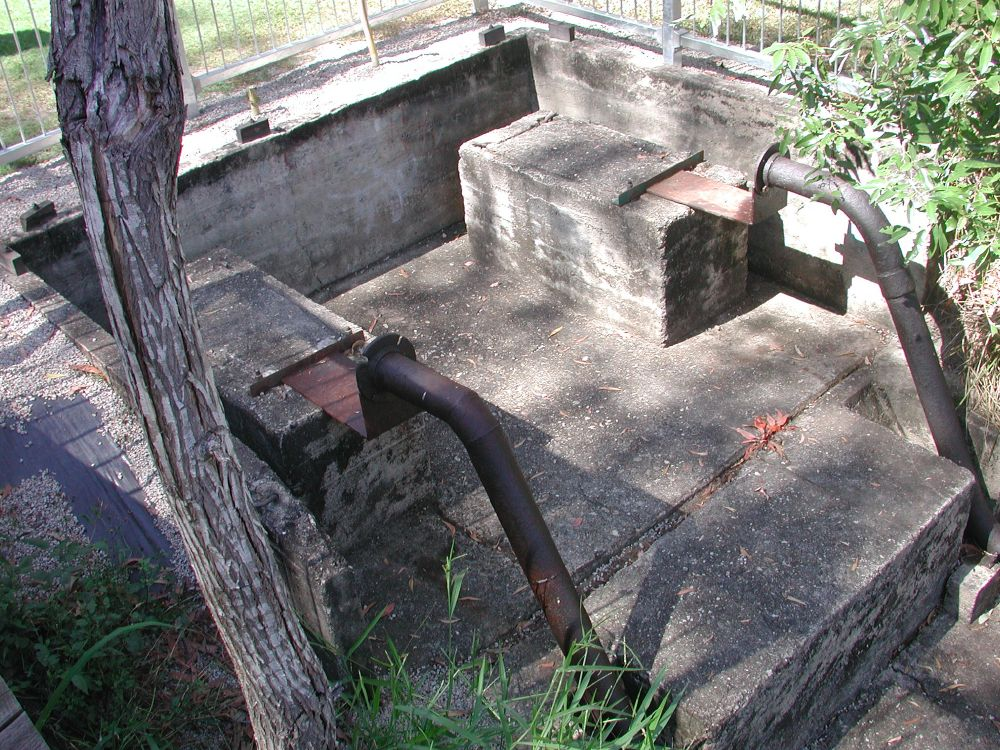
- Lagoon Creek Railway Water Supply Facility and Pump Station, 2006

- Location within Queensland Location within Australia
- 27.0714°S 152.9538°E
- Location: Buckle Street, Caboolture, City of Moreton Bay, Queensland, Australia

History
- Design period: 1900–1914 (early 20th century)
- Built: 1913–1947

Queensland Heritage Register
- Official name: Lagoon Creek Railway Water Supply Facility and Pump Station
- Type: state heritage (landscape, archaeological, built)
- Designated: 24 January 2003
- Reference no.: 602236
- Significant period: 1913–1968 (historical)
- Significant components: weir, slab/s – concrete, pipeline – water, views to

Lagoon Creek Pumping Station is a heritage-listed pumping station at Buckle Street, Caboolture, City of Moreton Bay, Queensland, Australia. It was built from 1913 to 1947. It was added to the Queensland Heritage Register on 24 January 2003.

== History ==
The former railway water supply pumping station was built in 1913 on a waterhole on Lagoon Creek at Caboolture. It was the third pump site drawing water from this source to supply tanks at the Caboolture railway station replenishing the stock of steam locomotives. The facility was developed in stages from the opening of the North Coast railway line until 1947 and its use was discontinued in 1968 when the use of steam locomotives on the line ceased.

Progress throughout the world during the 19th century was facilitated by the development of industrial technologies, particularly those associated with the use of steam power. The introduction of a railway transport system that was able to move large quantities of goods and materials quickly, reliably and cheaply and could carry passengers and mail was a key component in the development of a modern economic and social structure. In Australia, the linking of resources with trade outlets over large distances and the reliable provision of goods and services to new settlements was a vital factor in the settlement of the country. At the time the only alternative form of transport to rail was horse or bullock dray. Proximity or otherwise to a railway line frequently dictated the success or failure of a budding township. The construction of the North Coast railway line to Caboolture was the catalyst for its growth and development as the principal centre of the district.

At the separation of Queensland from New South Wales in 1859, Queensland had no railway system and only one good road, which linked Brisbane and Ipswich. The first railway line was laid between Ipswich and Toowoomba between 1864 and 1867. Laying new lines was expensive because of the distances and difficult terrain involved so priority was given to lines that connected inland resources with ports. Queensland railways were at first a series of parallel lines rather than a network and urban centres along the coast were linked comparatively late and little by little. A line along the coast north of Brisbane was surveyed in 1882 and approved in 1884.

Those surveying a new railway line took into account terrain, soil type, the presence of existing settlements and resources and proximity to a suitable water supply. A good supply of clean water was necessary to supply steam locomotives. Water had to be replenished at 30–40 miles (48–64 km) intervals, a procedure which took about 10 minutes. Watering stops were established at intervals along the line. In urban areas the town water supply was used, but where one did not exist other suitable sources were identified.

The availability of a good and plentiful supply at Lagoon Creek was instrumental in the choice of Caboolture as a railway station. When the line was first surveyed, it was thought that Morayfield might be chosen as it was already a settlement of some size, but the water supply was unsuitable and on 19 April 1884 a water reserve of approximately 130 hectares (320 acres) on the north of Lagoon Creek was proclaimed. A pump house was built at the northern end of the Caboolture railyards to draw water from Lagoon Creek. A pipe was laid to a nearby waterhole and water was then pumped to elevated tanks in the main railway yard from which the locomotives were supplied. The section of railway between Northgate and Caboolture was opened in 1888 and the section to Gympie in 1891.

The boiler supplied to provide steam power for the pumps had originally been part of one of the earliest steam locomotives to operate in Queensland, an A10 class locomotive, which was made by Neilson & Co of Glasgow and imported in 1867. The boiler was removed from its locomotive in 1889 and adapted to drive the pump at Lagoon Creek. However, by 1902, the creeks in the Caboolture district had fallen dramatically, a result of the severe and widespread drought of the late 1890s and early 1900s. By June 1902, it was estimated that, with a weekly consumption of about 60,000 imperial gallons (270,000 L; 72,000 US gal), there was only about six or seven weeks supply remaining in the lagoon. The railway's Chief Engineer, William Pagan, proposed that the pipeline be extended to a larger lagoon further down the creek. To avoid the necessity of resuming land, the pipes were laid along streets to the new site at the termination of a street and a new pump house was built on the bank of the lagoon.

The boiler installed at the new site was a vertical Smith and Faulkner boiler that had been installed in July 1902 at the previous site and operated a Worthington pump. Considerable problems were experienced with this boiler and within a few months, the recycled A10 boiler had replaced it.

The lagoon was estimated to have an unfailing supply and the new site was in use by early 1903. Although the drought broke in 1903 so that the water supply increased, the demand for water also increased along with the volume of traffic on the line. The major regional centre of Rockhampton was then linked to Brisbane and branch lines were constructed, including the important Kilcoy branch line in 1913. As a result of the increased demand improvements were carried out at Lagoon Creek pumping station. A small concrete weir 300 metres (980 ft) downstream was constructed to increase the capacity of the lagoon. The pumping equipment was upgraded and the station relocated to the eastern side of the lagoon. New pipes were laid and a boiler from a B15 locomotive was installed at the site.

The old boiler at the previous site was sold to WF Suffolk on 14 November 1913. It was stripped of useful components but the shell was left on site. At some point it fell into the lagoon where it stayed until raised in 2000.

In the 1930s 1.6 million litres of water were pumped weekly from the creek to supply railway locomotives. In 1939 electricity was supplied to the pumping station and electric pumps were installed, relegating the steam engine to a backup. In 1934 it had been planned to increase the height of the dam 18 inches (460 mm). This was done and wing walls built into the banks for support between 1943 and 1947.

Diesel trains began operating on main lines in Queensland from 1952 and did not need a water supply. In the 1950s and 1960s they gradually replaced steam trains and the last steam locomotive working on a regular basis in Queensland was decommissioned in 1969. By 1968, there were no steam engines on the North Coast line, so that the pumping station at Lagoon Creek was redundant. The station was closed and the pumping equipment removed in February 1968. The concrete slab and foundations of the pumping station remained, as did the weir. At the railway station the water tanks were removed and sold for scrap. The land containing the pumping station was sold to Caboolture Shire Council in 1984. Roads bound this land on the south and east and the lagoon on the west.

A non-profit community group, the Friends of Lagoon Creek, was formed in 1989 to work to preserve and protect Lagoon Creek and its eco- systems. The restoration and re-vegetation of the Lagoon Creek catchment is their primary objective and they are also working to conserve the pump station site, whose history they have researched. They removed the boiler from the creek in October 2000, it has had conservation work carried out on it and is currently held at Caboolture.

== Description ==
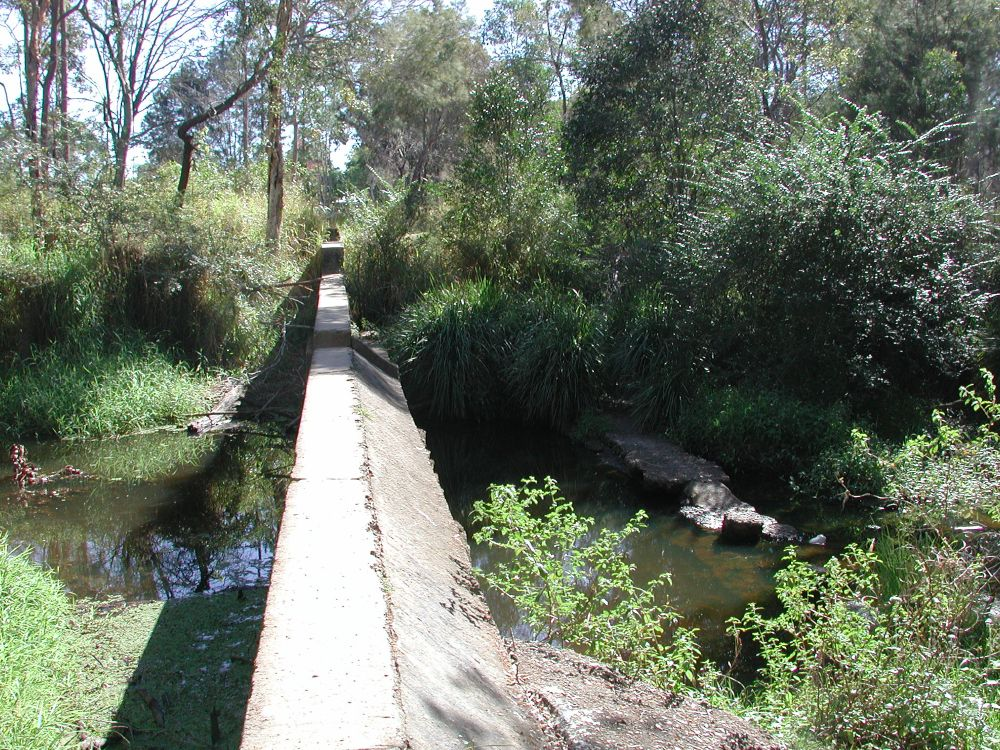
Dam wall, 2006

Lagoon Creek is a small watercourse in the Caboolture Shire. It begins at Moodlu and runs in an easterly direction through the north of Caboolture before entering Tea Tree Swamp on the eastern side of the Bruce Highway. It is an important part of the ecosystem within Caboolture Shire and provides a regular water flow into the Tea Tree Swamp Wetlands. The pump site is located approximately one kilometre north of the Caboolture CBD. It is situated at the end of Buckle Street and is shielded from the surrounding suburban development by mature vegetation.

The surviving built elements of the system comprise a concrete slab and foundations for the pumping station above the eastern bank of Lagoon Creek, associated iron pipes and a low concrete weir running from bank to bank some 300 metres (980 ft) downstream.

== Heritage listing ==
Lagoon Creek Pumping Station was listed on the Queensland Heritage Register on 24 January 2003 having satisfied the following criteria.

The place is important in demonstrating the evolution or pattern of Queensland's history.

The presence of a pumping station at Lagoon Creek demonstrates the role played by the construction and operation of the North Coast railway line and its branches in the development of Caboolture. A reliable source of clean water was essential to supply locomotives in the days of steam power. That Lagoon Creek offered this was a major factor in the choice of Caboolture as a railway centre and of its continued importance in this role.

The place demonstrates rare, uncommon or endangered aspects of Queensland's cultural heritage.

The weir and pumping station remains at Lagoon Creek are a rare surviving components of a water supply facility developed by Queensland Rail for the use of steam locomotives. A reliable water supply was ensured by the provision of tanks along the line using natural water sources where suitable water was available. The pumping station is evidence of the use of steam power, an early and important technology, in the development of Queensland's railway system.
