= Caboolture South, Queensland =

Caboolture South
- Suburb
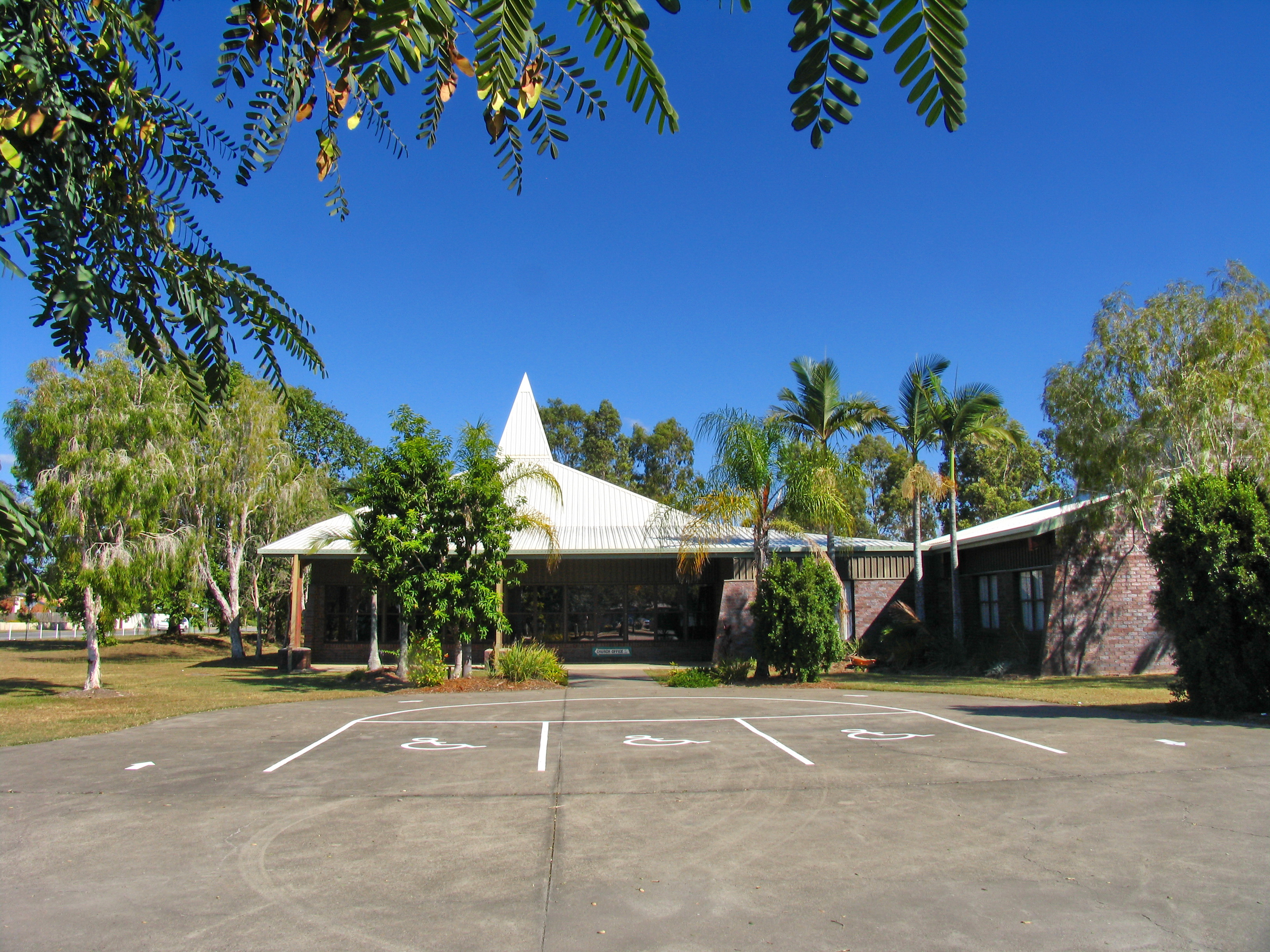
- Caboolture Baptist Church, 2007

- Interactive map of Caboolture South
- Coordinates: 27.0961°S 152.9491°E
- Country: Australia
- State: Queensland
- City: Moreton Bay
- LGA: City of Moreton Bay
- Location: 1.1 km (0.68 mi) S of Caboolture; 46.7 km (29.0 mi) N of Brisbane CBD

Government
  - State electorate: Morayfield
  - Federal division: Longman

Area
  - Total: 4.4 km^{2} (1.7 sq mi)

Population
  - Total: 7,539 (2021 census)
  - Density: 1,713/km^{2} (4,440/sq mi)
- Time zone: UTC+10:00 (AEST)
- Postcode: 4510
Suburbs around Caboolture South
Bellmere	Caboolture	Caboolture
Bellmere	Caboolture South	Morayfield
Morayfield	Morayfield	Morayfield

Caboolture South is a suburb in the City of Moreton Bay, Queensland, Australia. In the 2021 census, Caboolture South had a population of 7,539 people.

== Geography ==
The suburb is bounded to the north and west by the Caboolture River and to the east by Cundoor Creek, its tributary.

The North Coast railway line enters the suburb from the south-east (Morayfield) and exists to the north-east (Caboolture). The line splits the suburb with the areas west of the line being residential areas with associated services, while the areas east of the line are used for industry and agriculture.

The Burpengary–Caboolture Road (Morayfield Road) runs through from south to north.

== History ==
The name Caboolture is from the Yugarabul Aboriginal language meaning place of carpet snake which is located south of the original Caboolture township.

Caboolture State School opened on 4 August 1873. In 1890 it became Caboolture South State School. In 1908 it was renamed Morayfield State School.

Caboolture Special School opened in January 1980.

== Demographics ==
In the 2011 census, Caboolture South recorded a population of 4,857 people, 51% female and 49% male. The median age of the Caboolture South population was 31 years, 6 years below the national median of 37. People identifying as Aboriginal and Torres Strait Islander people make up 5.6% of the population. 77.7% of people living in Caboolture South were born in Australia. The other top responses for country of birth were New Zealand 4.9%, England 3.6%, Philippines 0.8%, Scotland 0.7%, Samoa 0.6%. 89.1% of people spoke only English at home; the next most common languages were 1.1% Samoan, 0.3% German, 0.3% Cantonese, 0.3% Arabic, 0.3% Italian.

In the 2016 census, Caboolture South had a population of 5,300 people.

In the 2021 census, Caboolture South had a population of 7,539 people.

== Education ==
Caboolture Special School is a special primary and secondary (Prep–12) school for boys and girls at Torrens Road (27.0967°S 152.9438°E). In 2018, the school had an enrolment of 250 students with 70 teachers (63 full-time equivalent) and 87 non-teaching staff (54 full-time equivalent).

There are no mainstream schools in Caboolture. The nearest government primary schools are Caboolture State School in neighbouring Caboolture to the north and Morayfield State School in neighbouring Morayfield to the south and Minimbah State School in neighbouring Morayfield to the south-west. The nearest government secondary schools are Caboolture State High School in neighbouring Caboolture to the north-east and Morayfield State High School in neighbouring Morayfield to the south-east.

== Amenities ==
Market Plaza shopping centre with Woolworths and specialty shops is at 49–55 Morayfield Road (on the corner with Market Drive, 27.0941°S 152.9518°E).

Caboolture Baptist Church is at 74–92 Grant Road (27.0964°S 152.9382°E).

Caboolture Arboretum is at 3 Mainsail Drive in the north-west of the suburb beside the Caboolture River (27.0877°S 152.9361°E). It provides green space for recreation with walking paths and duck ponds.

Leemon Park is at 14–24 Penhurst Street, extending to other nearby streets (27.0935°S 152.9380°E).
