= Moorina =

Moorina may refer to:

- Moorina, Queensland
- Moorina, Tasmania
