= Moodlu, Queensland =

Moodlu
- Suburb
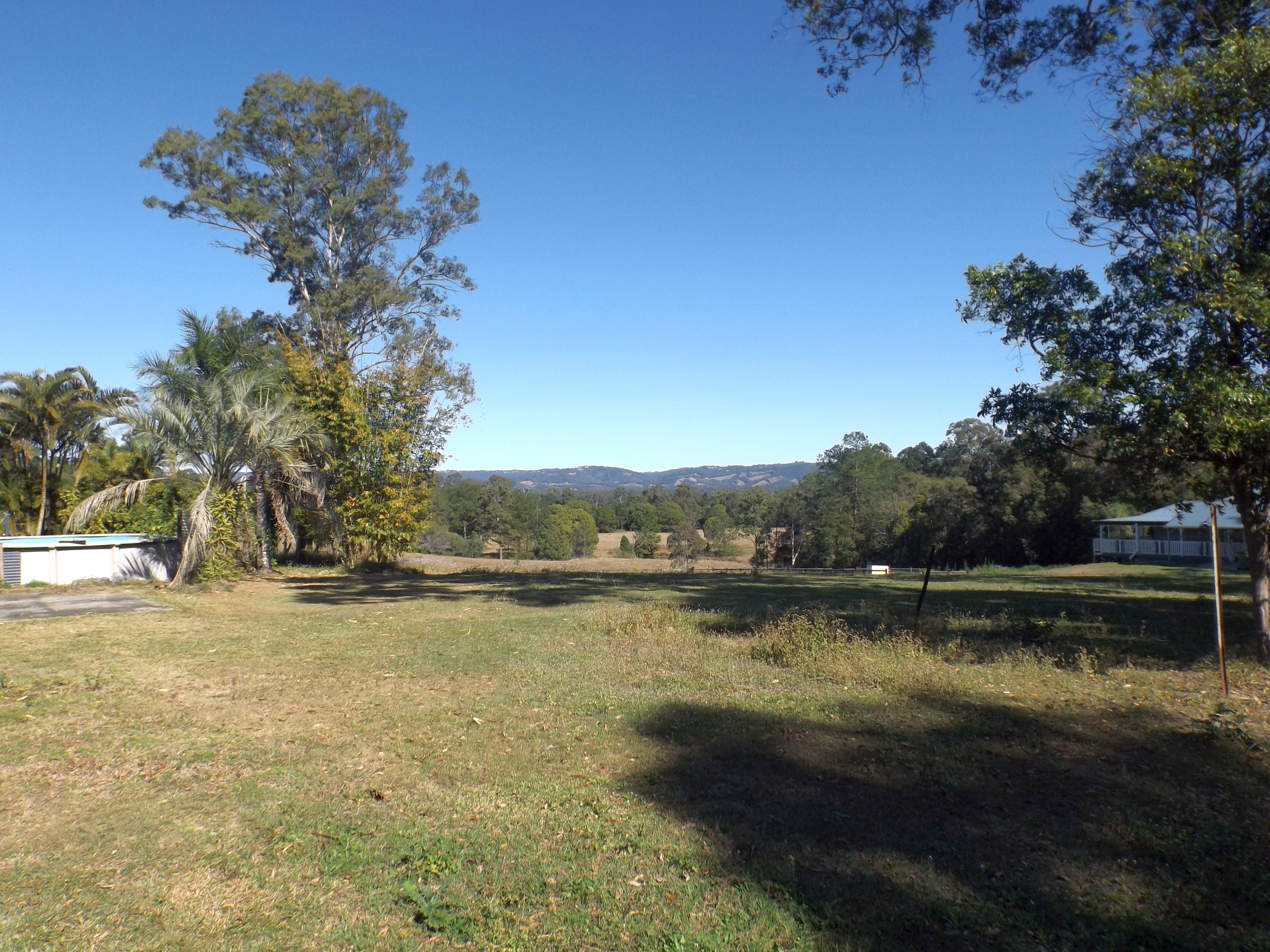
- View southwest Quarry Road, 2015

- Interactive map of Moodlu
- Coordinates: 27.0544°S 152.9113°E
- Country: Australia
- State: Queensland
- LGA: City of Moreton Bay
- Location: 6.7 km (4.2 mi) NW of Caboolture; 55.3 km (34.4 mi) N of Brisbane CBD

Government
  - State electorates: Pumicestone; Morayfield; Glass House
  - Federal division: Longman

Area
  - Total: 4.7 km^{2} (1.8 sq mi)

Population
  - Total: 285 (2021 census)
  - Density: 60.6/km^{2} (157.1/sq mi)
- Time zone: UTC+10:00 (AEST)
- Postcode: 4510
Suburbs around Moodlu
Wamuran	Caboolture	Caboolture
Wamuran	Moodlu	Caboolture
Bellmere	Bellmere	Caboolture

Moodlu is a rural locality in the City of Moreton Bay, Queensland, Australia. In the 2021 census, Moodlu had a population of 285 people.

== Geography ==
Moodlu is 55.3 kilometres (34.4 mi) by road north of the Brisbane CBD.

The D'Aguilar Highway runs through from east to west. The Caboolture Connection Road, formerly part of the D'Aguilar Highway, leaves the highway in Moodlu and runs south-east to Caboolture.

The proposed Bruce Highway Western Alternative will pass through Moodlu from south to north.

== History ==
The locality takes its name from its railway station which is a Kabi word meaning stone.

Moodlu Post Office opened on 1 July 1927 (a receiving office had been open from 1910) and closed in 1953.

Wararba Provisional School opened circa 1884. On 1 January 1909, it became Waraba State School. In 1911, it was renamed Moodlu State School. The school closed on 4 July 1947. It was on a 20-acre (8.1 ha) site at 199 Williams Road (27.0587°S 152.9109°E). The site is now the Caboolture Pony Club.

== Demographics ==
In the 2011 census, Moodlu recorded a population of 236 people, 51.7% female and 48.3% male. The median age of the Moodlu population was 46 years, 9 years above the national median of 37. 74.8% of people living in Moodlu were born in Australia. The other top responses for country of birth were England 7.1%, New Zealand 5.5%, Germany 2.1%, India 1.3%, Lithuania 1.3%. 88.6% of people spoke only English at home; the next most common languages were 3.4% Italian, 2.5% German, 1.7% Filipino, 0% Irish, 0% Gaelic (Scotland).

In the 2016 census, Moodlu had a population of 318 people.

In the 2021 census, Moodlu had a population of 285 people.

== Education ==
There are no schools in Moodlu. The nearest government primary and secondary schools are Tullawong State School and Tullawong State High School, both in neighbouring Caboolture to the south-east.
