= Pumicestone =

Pumicestone may refer to:

- The Electoral district of Pumicestone in Queensland, Australia
- The former name of Donnybrook, Queensland, Australia
