= Donnybrook, Queensland =

Donnybrook Queensland
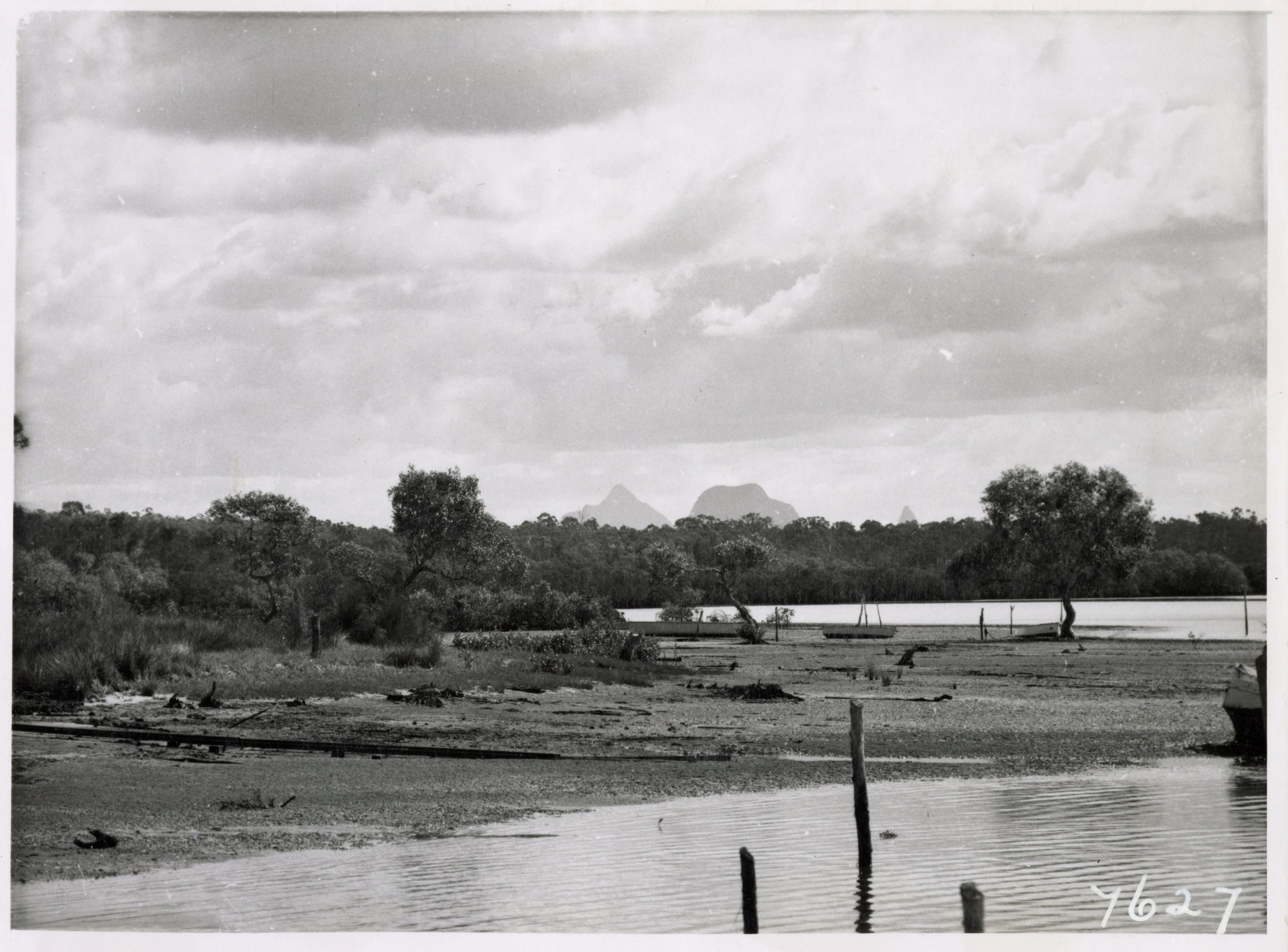
- Looking across Donnybrook towards the mountains Beerwah, Tibrogargan and Crookneck

- Coordinates: 27.0047°S 153.0699°E
- Population: 664 (2021 census)
  - Density: 27.21/km^{2} (70.48/sq mi)
- Postcode(s): 4510
- Area: 24.4 km^{2} (9.4 sq mi)
- Time zone: AEST (UTC+10:00)
- Location: 16.6 km (10 mi) SE of Beerburrum; 17.6 km (11 mi) NE of Caboolture; 66.8 km (42 mi) N of Brisbane CBD
- LGA(s): City of Moreton Bay
- State electorate(s): Pumicestone
- Federal division(s): Longman
Localities around Donnybrook:
Elimbah	Beerburrum	Pumicestone Passage
Elimbah	Donnybrook	Pumicestone Passage
Toorbul	Meldale	Pumicestone Passage

Donnybrook is a coastal town and locality in the City of Moreton Bay, Queensland, Australia. In the 2021 census, the locality of Donnybrook had a population of 664 people.

== Geography ==
Donnybrook is 60 kilometres (37 mi) north of Brisbane, the state capital. The closest major population centre is Caboolture, 20 kilometres (12 mi) to the west.

The town of Donnybrook is on the coast of the Australian mainland but is separated by the narrow Pumicestone Passage from Bribie Island.

== History ==
The town name was approved by the Queensland Place Names Board on 1 October 1975. The name appears to be derived from a corroboree site, or because of fights amongst oyster gatherers at weekend camps.

The town started out as a small fishing community but has since developed into a tourist destination.

Pumicestone Post Office opened on 1 August 1958. It was renamed Donnybrook in 1976.

Donnybrook District Bowls Club opened in 1980. In 2018, it broadened its scope to include darts and fishing.

In 1985, an unsealed road running along the waterfront was named Grant Lane after Robert Grant (1895 – 15 November 1991) for his 90th birthday, a popular local who everyone knew as "Pop". A few years later the road was sealed after he had complained for years of the dust produced by all the passers-by.

Sand mining commenced in the area in 2009 but was abandoned a few years later in 2012 because the sand resource was found to be poor and the mine was unprofitable.

== Demographics ==
In the 2006 census, the locality of Donnybrook had a population of 554 people.

In the 2011 census, the locality of Donnybrook had a population of 461 people, 48.6% female and 51.4% male. The median age of the Donnybrook population was 53 years, compared to the national median age of 37. 87.3% of people living in Donnybrook were born in Australia. The other top responses for country of birth were New Zealand 4.8%, Germany 1.1%, Netherlands 1.1%, Papua New Guinea 1.1%, Wales 0.9%. 93.7% of people spoke only English at home; the next most common language was 1.1% Greek.

In the 2016 census, the locality of Donnybrook had a population of 617 people.

In the 2021 census, the locality of Donnybrook had a population of 664 people.

== Education ==
There are no schools in Donnybrook. The nearest government primary schools are Beerburrum State School in neighbouring Beerburrum to the north-west and Pumicestone State School in Caboolture to the south-west. The nearest government secondary school is Caboolture State High School in Caboolture to the south-west.

== Transport ==
There is no regular public bus service in Donnybrook, however there is one bus service every Thursday. This service is operated under route 9999. It travels from Toorbul providing connection to services at Caboolture and Morayfield.

== Amenities ==
Donnybrook Community Hall is at 26 Edith Street (corner of Alice Street, 27.0039°S 153.0690°E). The Moreton Bay City Council operates a mobile library service which visits the Donnybook Community Hall.

Donnybrook Post Office is at 10 Alice Street, south-west corner with Amy Street (27.0002°S 153.0701°E).

Donnybrook Rural Fire Station is at 55 Alice Street (27.0035°S 153.0691°E).

The boat ramp at the end of Grant Lane opposite caravan park (27.0000°S 153.0712°E) provides boating access to the Pumicestone Passage. It is managed by the Moreton Bay City Council.

Donnybrook Sports & Community Club is at 11 Amy Street (27.0008°S 153.0688°E). It offers competitive and social lawn bowls, social darts, and competitive and social fishing events for members and visitors.
