= Peter Flannery (politician) =

Australian politician

Councillor Peter Flannery
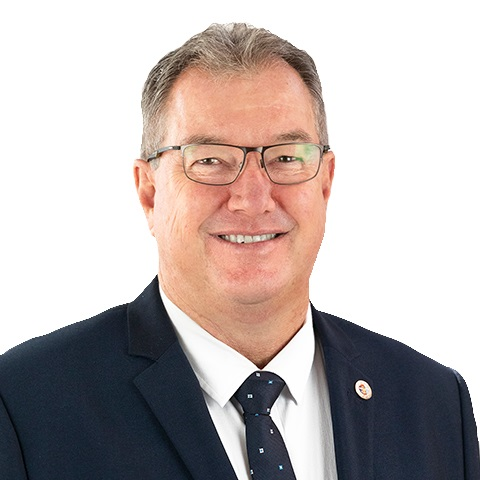

Mayor of the City of Moreton Bay known as Moreton Bay Region until 2023
- Incumbent
- Assumed office 28 March 2020
- Preceded by: Allan Sutherland

Moreton Bay Regional Councillor for Division 2
- In office 28 April 2012 – 28 March 2020
- Preceded by: Chris Whiting
- Succeeded by: Mark Booth

Personal details
- Born: Toowoomba, Queensland
- Party: Independent
- Spouse: Annemarie Flannery
- Children: 9 including step children

Military service
- Allegiance: Australia
- Branch/service: Australian Army
- Years of service: 1983–1994

Peter John Flannery is an Australian politician currently serving as the mayor of the City of Moreton Bay in Queensland, Australia's third most-populous local government area.

== Political career ==
Flannery served as a Caboolture Shire Councillor from 2004 to 2008.

He served as Councillor for Division 2 of the Moreton Bay Region from 2012 to 2020.

Flannery was elected mayor of the Moreton Bay Regional Council in 2020. In July 2023 during his tenure, the Moreton Bay Region was renamed the City of Moreton Bay.

=== Homelessness controversy ===
On 12 December 2024, Flannery instigated a council ban on the homeless sleeping in vans or other vehicles deemed equipped for camping, along with a ban on the homeless keeping pet animals. Flannery subsequently justified this action by claiming illegal behaviour by some of the homeless and that the pet animals constituted a threat. He also indicated that the situation was unacceptable and that he would stand for it no longer. There was an immediate community outcry following the decision, with the issue gaining nationwide media coverage and critics calling the Council out of touch and heartless, especially bearing in mind there is often no realistic alternative to sleeping in a car or van, and that pet animals are often a source of much-needed comfort to the homeless.
