= Catherine Clark (sports administrator) =

Australian sports administrator

Catherine Clark was an Australian sport administrator. She has held several chief executive officer positions with state and national sports organisations.

== Early years ==
Clark attended Caboolture State High School from 1991 to 1995, where she represented Queensland in hockey. Injury ended her elite hockey career.

Between 1996 and 1999, Clark completed Bachelor of Arts in criminology at the Queensland University of Technology and between 2010 and 2013, undertook a Masters of Business Administration at the University of Queensland.

== Sports administration ==
Clark's sport administration employment has included Sport and Recreation New Zealand policy advisor, International Paralympic Committee consultant, Gymsports New Zealand's Chief Executive Officer (2007–2008), CEO of Gymnastics Australia (2010–2012) and CEO of Netball Queensland (2015–2021). Under her leadership with Netball Queensland, the Queensland Firebirds won two ANZ Championships and Netball Queensland built the new $46M state-of-the art Queensland State Netball Centre. Under Clark's leadership in 2021, relations between Netball Queensland and Ipswich Netball Association soured, ending in a lengthy legal battle. The Queensland Supreme Court ruled that Netball Queensland's decision to not renew Ipswich Netball Association's affiliation was not authorised and therefore invalid.

By 2021, Clark was an accredited Australian Institute of Company Director and had been a director of Hockey Queensland, Australian University Sport, Australian Commonwealth Games Association (Queensland Division), and Shooting Australia.

In 2021, she was the chief executive officer of Paralympics Australia from January 2022 to July 2024. In what was given to be a 'mystery absence before shock resignation', after 2.5 years with PA, Clark resigned eight weeks prior to the start of the Paralympic Games in Paris.

== Integrity administration ==
On 12 September 2024, Clark was announced as the new commissioner of the Queensland Racing Integrity Commission. The embattled QRIC, formed in July 2016, has duties including overviewing horse and greyhound racing.

== Recognition ==
- 2016 – Queensland's Sport Administrator of the Year
- 2019 – Australian Financial Review's 100 Most Influential Women for 2019.
