= Moreton Bay Local Heritage Register =

Heritage register in Australia

The Moreton Bay Local Heritage Register is a heritage register containing a list of culturally-significant places within the City of Moreton Bay, Queensland, Australia. Under Section 113 of the Queensland Heritage Act 1992, all local government authorities in Queensland must maintain a local heritage register.

The Moreton Bay City Council maintains its local heritage register in two parts:

- List of sites, objects and buildings of significant historical and cultural value
- List of significant trees

== List of sites, objects and buildings of significant historical and cultural value ==
Name	Address	Suburb	Coordinates	Notes
Dayboro Community Hall & RSL World War II Honour Board	6 Bradley Street	Dayboro	27.1975°S 152.8231°E	
Dayboro Police Buildings	14 Bradley Street	Dayboro	27.1977°S 152.8233°E	
RSL World War 1 Memorial Obelisk	Corner of Dayboro State School 58 McKenzie Street	Dayboro	27.1943°S 152.8208°E	
A.N.Z. Bank and Residence (Former ES&A Bank)	28 Willams Street	Dayboro	27.1963°S 152.8244°E	
Lawnton Cemetery	Norfolk Avenue	Lawnton	27.2765°S 152.9774°E	
Sweeney’s Reserve	Old Dayboro Road	Petrie	27.2730°S 152.9754°E	
