= City of Moreton Bay =

Local government area in Australia

Coordinates: 27°17′36″S 152°55′48″E

- Local government area
- Location within South East Queensland

- Interactive map of City of Moreton Bay
- Country: Australia
- State: Queensland
- Region: South East Queensland
- Established: 2008; 18 years ago
- Council seat: Strathpine, Caboolture, Redcliffe

Government
  - Mayor: Peter Flannery
  - State electorate: Bancroft, Ferny Grove, Kurwongbah, Morayfield, Glass House, Murrumba, Pumicestone, Redcliffe, Everton, Pine Rivers
  - Federal division: Petrie, Dickson, Longman

Area
  - Total: 2,042 km^{2} (788 sq mi)

Population
  - Totals: 476,340 (2021 census) (3rd); 469,465 (2019 est.)
  - Density: 233.27/km^{2} (604.17/sq mi)
- Website: City of Moreton Bay
LGAs around City of Moreton Bay
Somerset	Sunshine Coast	Moreton Bay
Somerset	City of Moreton Bay	Moreton Bay
Somerset	Brisbane	Brisbane

The City of Moreton Bay, known until July 2023 as the Moreton Bay Region, is a local government area that forms the northern section of Greater Brisbane in South East Queensland, Australia. Established in 2008, it replaced three established local government areas, the City of Redcliffe and the Shires of Pine Rivers and Caboolture.

With an estimated operating budget of A$391 million and a 2018 population of 459,585, Moreton Bay is the third most populous local government area in Australia behind the City of Brisbane and City of Gold Coast, both of which are also amalgamated entities.

In the 2021 census, the City of Moreton Bay had a population of 476,340 people.

== History ==
The original inhabitants, or Traditional Owners, of Moreton Bay are the Kabi Kabi, Jinibara and Turrbal Aboriginal people.

Duungidjawu (also known as Kabi Kabi, Cabbee, Carbi, Gabi Gabi) is an Australian Aboriginal language spoken on Duungidjawu country. The Duungidjawu language region includes the landscape within the local government boundaries of Somerset Region and the City of Moreton Bay, particularly the towns of Caboolture, Kilcoy, Woodford and Moore.

At the time the Divisional Boards Act 1879 came into force on 11 November 1879, the present City of Morton Bay was entirely contained within the Caboolture Division, which also included the Sunshine Coast. By 1890, Caboolture Division had shrunk considerably with the separate incorporation of the Pine Division (21 January 1888), Redcliffe Division (5 April 1888) and Maroochy Division (5 July 1890).

With the passage of the Local Authorities Act 1902, Caboolture, Pine and Redcliffe (as well as Maroochy) became Shires on 31 March 1903. Redcliffe was proclaimed a Town on 28 May 1921 and a City on 13 June 1959. A few weeks earlier, on 23 May 1959, Pine was renamed the Shire of Pine Rivers.

=== Formation ===
In July 2007, the Local Government Reform Commission released its report and recommended the amalgamation of the three local government areas:

- City of Redcliffe
- Shire of Pine Rivers
- Shire of Caboolture

It argued that the area was part of the South East Queensland Regional Plan's Urban Footprint, and would attract 11% of the region's population and housing growth to 2006. A very strong community of interest was identified through the region's links and dependencies to Brisbane. The councils disagreed with the commission's plans although, with the exception of Redcliffe, did not oppose alternative amalgamation options.

On 10 August 2007, the Local Government Reform Implementation Bill 2007 was introduced. The Local Transition Committee for the amalgamation of the councils was established, composing of ten members, which included representatives from each of the three Councils and an Interim CEO. The first meeting of the committee was held on 3 September 2007. On 10 September 2007, Ray Burton was appointed as the interim CEO for the committee.

On 15 March 2008, the City and Shires formally ceased to exist and were amalgamated into a new local government area called the Moreton Bay Region. Elections were held on the same day to elect councillors and a mayor to the regional council. In 2012, following the election of the LNP state government, Redcliffe sought to enter a de-amalgamation process; however, a deadline to gather signatures on a petition by 29 August 2012 was missed. The Hills District sought in 2011 to transfer to Brisbane City Council, but the local government Change Commissioner declined the proposal on cost grounds.

On 8 December 2021, the council unanimously voted to rename the council area to Moreton Bay City and to seek approval from the Local Government Change Commission for the renaming.

In April 2023, the Queensland Government decided to reflect the growing population of the region by creating five new localities named Corymbia, Greenstone, Lilywood, Wagtail Grove, and Waraba by excising parts of the existing localities of Bellmere, Rocksberg, Upper Caboolture, and Wamuran.

In July 2023, the Moreton Bay Region was renamed the City of Moreton Bay.

The City of Moreton Bay is divided into 12 divisions, each of which elects one councillor. Additionally, the entire city elects a mayor. Allan Sutherland was elected as the first mayor at the 2008 elections, and Peter Flannery as the second mayor in 2020.

== Council ==
City of Moreton Bay

History
- Founded: 2008
- Preceded by: City of Redcliffe; Shire of Pine Rivers; Shire of Caboolture

Leadership
- Mayor: Peter Flannery, Independent; Since March 2020
- Deputy Mayor: Jodie Shipway, Independent; Since October 2021

Structure
- Seats: 13 elected members including 1 Lord Mayor and 12 Division Councillors
- Political groups: Independent (10); Ind. Labor (2); Ind. Liberal National (1)

Elections
- Voting system: Optional preferential voting
- First election: 15 March 2008
- Last election: 16 March 2024
- Next election: 25 March 2028

=== Current composition ===
The current council as it currently sits, after the 2024 election and subsequent by-election is:

Ward	Councillor	Party
Mayor	Peter Flannery	Independent
Division 1	Brooke Savige	Independent
Division 2	Mark Booth	Independent
Division 3	Adam Hain	Independent LNP
Division 4	Jodie Shipway	Independent
Division 5	Sandra Ruck	Independent
Division 6	Karl Winchester	Independent Labor
Division 7	Yvonne Barlow	Independent
Division 8	Jim Moloney	Independent Labor
Division 9	Cath Tonks	Independent
Division 10	Matthew Constance	Independent
Division 11	Ellie Smith	Independent
Division 12	Tony Latter	Independent

== Mayors ==
=== 2008−present ===
No.	Portrait	Mayor	Party	Term start	Term end
1		Allan Sutherland	Independent	15 March 2008	28 March 2020
2		Peter Flannery	Independent	28 March 2020	incumbent

=== Deputy mayors ===
No.	Portrait	Mayor	Party	Term start	Term end	Mayor
1		Greg Chippendale	Independent	2008	2013	Sutherland (Independent)
2		Mike Charlton	Independent	2013	2020	Sutherland (Independent)
3		Denise Sims	Independent	2020	October 2021	Flannery (Independent)
4		Jodie Shipway	Independent	2021	October 2021	Flannery (Independent)

== Past councillors ==
=== 2008−present ===
Year	Div 1	Div 2	Div 3	Div 4	Div 5	Div 6	Div 7	Div 8	Div 9	Div 10	Div 11	Div 12
Year	Councillor	Councillor	Councillor	Councillor	Councillor	Councillor	Councillor	Councillor	Councillor	Councillor	Councillor	Councillor
2008	Gary Parsons (Ind.)	Chris Whiting (Ind. Labor)	Greg Chippendale (Ind.)	Julie Greer (Ind.)	James Houghton (Ind.)	Rae Frawley (Ind.)	David Dwyer (Ind.)	Mick Gillam (Ind. Labor)	Mike Charlton (Ind.)	Brian Battersby (Ind.)	Bob Millar (Ind.)	Adrian Raedel (Ind.)
2012	Gary Parsons (Ind.)	Peter Flannery (Ind.)	Greg Chippendale (Ind.)	Julie Greer (Ind.)	James Houghton (Ind.)	Koliana Winchester (Ind. Labor)	David Dwyer (Ind.)	Mick Gillam (Ind. Labor)	Mike Charlton (Ind.)	Brian Battersby (Ind.)	Bob Millar (Ind.)	Adrian Raedel (Ind.)
2016	Brooke Savige (Ind.)	Peter Flannery (Ind.)	Adam Hain (Ind./Ind. LNP)	Julie Greer (Ind.)	James Houghton (Ind.)	Koliana Winchester (Ind. Labor)	Denise Sims (Ind.)	Mick Gillam (Ind. Labor)	Mike Charlton (Ind.)	Matt Constance (Ind.)	Darren Grimwade (Ind.)	Adrian Raedel (Ind.)
2020	Brooke Savige (Ind.)	Mark Booth (Ind.)	Adam Hain (Ind./Ind. LNP)	Jodie Shipway (Ind.)	Sandra Ruck (Ind.)	Karl Winchester (Ind. Labor)	Denise Sims (Ind.)	Mick Gillam (Ind. Labor)	Cath Tonks (Ind.)	Matt Constance (Ind.)	Darren Grimwade (Ind.)	Tony Latter (Ind.)
2021	Brooke Savige (Ind.)	Mark Booth (Ind.)	Adam Hain (Ind./Ind. LNP)	Jodie Shipway (Ind.)	Sandra Ruck (Ind.)	Karl Winchester (Ind. Labor)	Yvonne Barlow (Ind. LNP/Ind.)	Mick Gillam (Ind. Labor)	Cath Tonks (Ind.)	Matt Constance (Ind.)	Darren Grimwade (Ind.)	Tony Latter (Ind.)
2022	Brooke Savige (Ind.)	Mark Booth (Ind.)	Adam Hain (Ind./Ind. LNP)	Jodie Shipway (Ind.)	Sandra Ruck (Ind.)	Karl Winchester (Ind. Labor)	Yvonne Barlow (Ind. LNP/Ind.)	Mick Gillam (Ind. Labor)	Cath Tonks (Ind.)	Matt Constance (Ind.)	Darren Grimwade (Ind.)	Tony Latter (Ind.)
2024	Brooke Savige (Ind.)	Mark Booth (Ind.)	Adam Hain (Ind./Ind. LNP)	Jodie Shipway (Ind.)	Sandra Ruck (Ind.)	Karl Winchester (Ind. Labor)	Yvonne Barlow (Ind. LNP/Ind.)	Jim Moloney (Ind. Labor)	Cath Tonks (Ind.)	Matt Constance (Ind.)	Darren Grimwade (Ind.)	Tony Latter (Ind.)
2024	Brooke Savige (Ind.)	Mark Booth (Ind.)	Adam Hain (Ind./Ind. LNP)	Jodie Shipway (Ind.)	Sandra Ruck (Ind.)	Karl Winchester (Ind. Labor)	Yvonne Barlow (Ind. LNP/Ind.)	Jim Moloney (Ind. Labor)	Cath Tonks (Ind.)	Matt Constance (Ind.)	Darren Grimwade (Ind.)	Tony Latter (Ind.)
2025	Brooke Savige (Ind.)	Mark Booth (Ind.)	Adam Hain (Ind./Ind. LNP)	Jodie Shipway (Ind.)	Sandra Ruck (Ind.)	Karl Winchester (Ind. Labor)	Yvonne Barlow (Ind. LNP/Ind.)	Jim Moloney (Ind. Labor)	Cath Tonks (Ind.)	Matt Constance (Ind.)		Tony Latter (Ind.)

== Election results ==
=== 2024 ===
2024 Queensland local elections: Moreton Bay
Party	Votes	%	Swing	Seats	Change
Independent	87,701	56.81		10	Steady
Independent Labor	24,169	15.66		2	Steady
Community Centred and Connected	16,715	10.83		0	Steady
Independent LNP	10,274	6.65		0	Steady
Greens	8,939	5.79		0	Steady
Independent Democrat	3,322	2.15		0	Steady
Animal Justice	3,240	2.10		0	Steady
Formal votes	154,360	92.42			
Informal votes	12,664	7.58			
Total	167,024	100.0			

== Unitywater ==
On 1 July 2010, Moreton Bay's water services (along with Sunshine Coast Council's), moved over to the recently created water body, Unitywater. Unitywater was created by the Queensland Government as part of the state's takeover of South East Queensland's water facilities, dams and water supply networks. City of Moreton Bay, Sunshine Coast Council and Noosa Shire Council are joint owners of Unitywater.

== Suburbs ==
The City of Moreton Bay includes the following places:

=== Redcliffe area ===
- Redcliffe
- Clontarf
- Deception Bay
- Kippa-Ring
- Margate
- Newport
- Rothwell
- Scarborough
- Woody Point

=== Pine Rivers area ===
==== Urban suburbs ====
- Albany Creek
- Arana Hills
- Bray Park
- Brendale
- Eatons Hill
- Everton Hills
- Ferny Hills
- Griffin
- Kallangur
- Lawnton
- Mango Hill
- Murrumba Downs
- North Lakes
- Petrie
- Strathpine
- Warner

==== Rural localities ====
- Armstrong Creek
- Bunya
- Camp Mountain
- Cashmere
- Cedar Creek
- Clear Mountain
- Closeburn
- Dakabin
- Dayboro
- Draper
- Highvale
- Jollys Lookout
- Joyner
- King Scrub
- Kobble Creek
- Kurwongbah
- Laceys Creek
- Mount Glorious
- Mount Nebo
- Mount Pleasant
- Mount Samson
- Ocean View
- Rush Creek
- Samford Valley
- Samford Village
- Samsonvale
- Whiteside
- Wights Mountain
- Yugar

=== Caboolture area ===
Coastal Caboolture region:

- Beachmere
- Bellmere
- Burpengary
- Burpengary East
- Caboolture
- Caboolture South
- Deception Bay
- Donnybrook
- Elimbah
- Godwin Beach
- Meldale
- Moodlu
- Morayfield
- Narangba
- Ningi
- Sandstone Point
- Toorbul
- Upper Caboolture

Inland Caboolture region:

- Bellthorpe
- Booroobin
- Bracalba
- Campbells Pocket
- Cedarton
- Commissioners Flat
- Corymbia
- D'Aguilar
- Delaneys Creek
- Greenstone
- Lilywood
- Moorina
- Mount Delaney
- Mount Mee
- Neurum
- Rocksberg
- Stanmore
- Stony Creek
- Wagtail Grove
- Waraba
- Wamuran
- Wamuran Basin
- Woodford

Bribie Island:

- Banksia Beach
- Bellara
- Bongaree
- Bribie Island NP:
- Welsby
- White Patch
- Woorim

== Demographics ==
The populations given relate to the component entities prior to 2008. The 2011 census was the first for the amalgamated council.

Year	Population (total)	Caboolture	Pine Rivers	Redcliffe
1933	11,928	5,316	4,604	2,008
1947	19,402	5,716	4,815	8,871
1954	27,267	7,101	6,309	13,857
1961	39,312	8,877	8,761	21,674
1966	50,785	10,149	13,309	27,327
1971	72,955	12,207	26,187	34,561
1976	103,669	19,404	45,192	39,073
1981	133,056	32,644	58,189	42,223
1986	166,210	47,494	73,783	44,933
1991	205,743	70,052	87,892	47,799
1996	250,077	98,859	103,192	48,026
2001	286,532	114,338	122,303	49,891
2005	325,067	131,667	141,380	52,020
2007	344,878	140,288	150,871	53,719
2009	371,155	151,290	163,510	56,355
2011	389,684	158,988	172,593	58,103
2016	425,302	-	-	-
2021	476,340	-	-	-

Selected historical census data for Moreton Bay local government area
Census year		2011	2016	2021
Population	Estimated residents on census night	378,045	425,302	476,340
Population	LGA rank in terms of size within Queensland	3rd	3rd	3rd
Population	% of Queensland population	8.73%	▲9.04%	▲9.24%
Population	% of Australian population	1.76%	▲1.82%	▲1.87%
Dwelling structure				
Dwelling type	Separate house	85.9%	▼83.0%	▼81.1%
Dwelling type	Semi-detached, terrace or townhouse	7.4%	▲11.0%	▲13.3%
Dwelling type	Flat or apartment	5.7%	▼5.0%	▼4.7%

== Facilities ==
The City of Moreton Bay operates libraries at Albany Creek, Arana Hills, Bongaree (Bribie Island), Burpengary, Caboolture, Deception Bay, North Lakes, Redcliffe, Strathpine, and Woodford. It also operates a mobile library service on a fortnightly basis serving the suburbs of Beachmere, Bray Park, Dayboro, Donnybrook, Lawnton, Mount Glorious, Mount Mee, Mount Nebo, Mount Samson Petrie, Samford, Toorbul and Warner.

== Traffic Signals ==
In 2026, the City of Moreton Bay drew national attention for a trial of "AI" powered traffic signals. The trial installation was to be installed at the intersection of Moreton Parade and Paper Avenue in Petrieusing using CCTV and LiDAR sensors supplied by Swarco. The technology will cost around $170,000. It is expected the upgrade will begin from September, with the trial concluding in 2029. It will use movement-based rather than phase-based control. Four cameras cameras and two LiDAR sensors will be installed at the trial site. A City of Moreton Bay spokesperson told iTnews that the technology is being used in parts of Europe and had "surfaced" in Singapore, New Zealand and Qatar. Swarco supplies multiple traffic signal control systems including ImFlow, "SMART AI" (which uses a reinforcement learning model) and QuicTrac.. In August 2026 the council was in the final stages of procurement, with the detail on how AI would be used and the roads involved yet to be determined.

ImFlow is a distributed, adaptive optimiser that optimises individual junctions and coordinates junctions without locking cycle times (like SCOOT). Each junction communicates with neighbouring intersections, without central coordination (like SCATS). Policies in ImFlow include detailed prioritisation between modes. Previous ImFlow installations have initially focused on getting traffic moving, reducing delays and increasing road capacity to "get the drivers happy", with support for "sliders" to adjust per-mode prioritisation to implement policy goals.

== Local heritage register ==
The City of Moreton Bay maintains its local heritage register in two parts:

- List of sites, objects and buildings of significant historical and cultural value
- List of significant trees
