= Caboolture State High School =

Public school in Queensland, Australia

Location
- Lee Street; Caboolture, Queensland; Australia; 27.084°S 152.9615°E

Information
- Type: Public, secondary
- Motto: May I be worthy
- Established: 1958
- Grades: 7–12
- Enrolment: 1468 (2022)
- Colours: Bottle green, grey (Junior Grade 7–9) and white (Senior Grade 10–12)
- Website: CSHS

Caboolture State High School is a coeducational independent public secondary school located in Caboolture in the local government area of the City of Moreton Bay in Queensland, Australia.

== LearnIT ==
LearnIT was Excellence Program available to high-achieving students from Years 7 to 10. Students had to complete an interview process and obtain evidence of academic success, behavior and work ethic to be eligible for the program. They also had the opportunity to obtain a Certificate II in Information, Digital Media & Technology by the end of Year 10. The program was since discontinued at the end of 2019, with the last of its students completing it in 2022, and graduating in 2024.

== Vocational Education & Training ==
Vocational Education & Training (VET) courses available to students in Year 10 include:

- Certificate I in AgriFood Operations (AHC10216)
- Certificate I in Information, Digital Media & Technology (ICT10115)
- Certificate II in Information, Digital Media & Technology (ICT20115) (LearnIT only)

VET courses available to students in Years 11 and 12 include:

- Certificate II in Creative Industries (Media) (CUA20215)
- Certificate II in Hospitality (SIT20136)
- Certificate II in Rural Operations (AHC21216)
- Certificate III in Business (BSB30115)
- Certificate III in Information, Digital Media & Technology (ICT30115)
- Certificate II in Construction Pathways (CPC20220)
- Certificate II in Engineering Pathways (MEM20422)
- Certificate III in Sport and Recreation (SIS30115)

== Extra-curricular activities ==
Extra-curricular activities available to students at Caboolture State High School include:

- Camps
  - Year 12 leadership camp; Noosa North Shore
  - Year 12 ski trip; Perisher Ski Resort
  - Chinese overseas trip to China
- Cattle Club
- Public speaking
  - Lions' Youth of the Year
  - Plain English Speaking
  - Quota
  - Rotary
  - Zonta Young Women in Public Speaking Award
- Queensland Debating Society competition

== Notable alumni ==
- Ian Baker-Finch, golfer and sports commentator
- Glen Boss, jockey
- Catherine Clark, sports administrator
- Sarah Harris, television presenter and journalist
- Andrew Lofthouse, radio and television news reporter
- Keith Urban, country music singer, songwriter and record producer
