= Morayfield State High School =

- MSHS

Location
- Visentin Road; Morayfield, Queensland; Australia; 27.1083°S 152.9542°E

Information
- Type: state high school
- Motto: Strength Through Integrity
- Established: 27 January 1981
- Principal: Pete Keen
- Grades: 7–12
- Enrolment: 1600+
- Colours: Teal and navy blue, with white.
- Yearbook: Osprey
- Affiliation: Education Queensland
- Website: morayfieldshs.eq.edu.au

Morayfield State High School is a public, coeducational high school in Morayfield, Queensland, Australia. It opened on 28 January 1981.

== Campus ==
Morayfield High School sits beside the intersection of Visentin Road and Buchanan Road.

The school campus is directly over the road from Morayfield Train Station.

The campus consists mostly of several single-storey buildings along two avenues emanating from a central courtyard, with two two-level, modern buildings, one predominantly Maths building and a second senior education building containing science, modern computer labs and accessible learning spaces. Most buildings are purpose-built for particular curricula; for example, science labs and art studios. The campus includes sporting facilities on its periphery.

== Curriculum ==
Senior Education and Training Plans are developed for all students in the school, identifying a designated pathway to Tertiary Studies, Further Training or employment. Students in Year 10 select a course of study that prepares them for studies in Years 11 and 12. Year 11 and 12 students complete studies in English and Mathematics and a selection of Queensland Studies Authority Subjects, Queensland Studies Authority Registered Subjects and Vocational education and training certificates. Traineeships and school based apprenticeships are also available.

== Academies ==
Morayfield State High School have multiple highly successful academies. In sport, these consist of the Rugby League Boys and Girls Academy and a Touch Football/Netball Academy for girls.

In 2026 Morayfield State High School launched their inaugural Arts Academy, established to provide students opportunities in drama, dance and music. It was introduced as part of the school’s broader commitment to arts education and the development of students career readiness. Since its establishment, this academy has proven highly successful, with students all gaining high results in academic achievement, effort and behaviour.

Morayfield State High School are also invested in their eSports academy, which are current three-time winning champions of the QUT Sport Tech Challenge for three years in a row (2023–2025).
