= Caboolture =

- Town
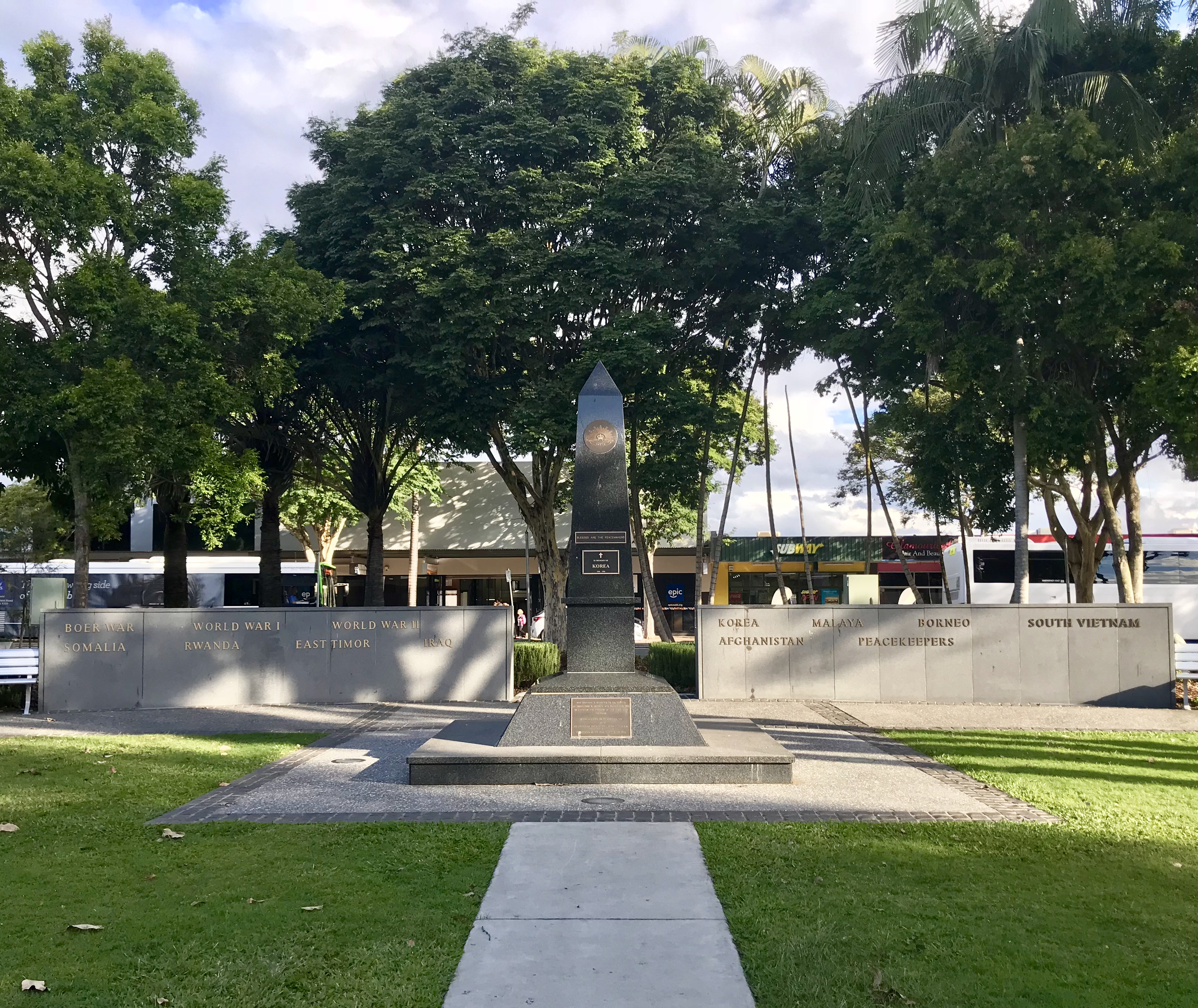
- War memorial in the Caboolture Town square, CBD

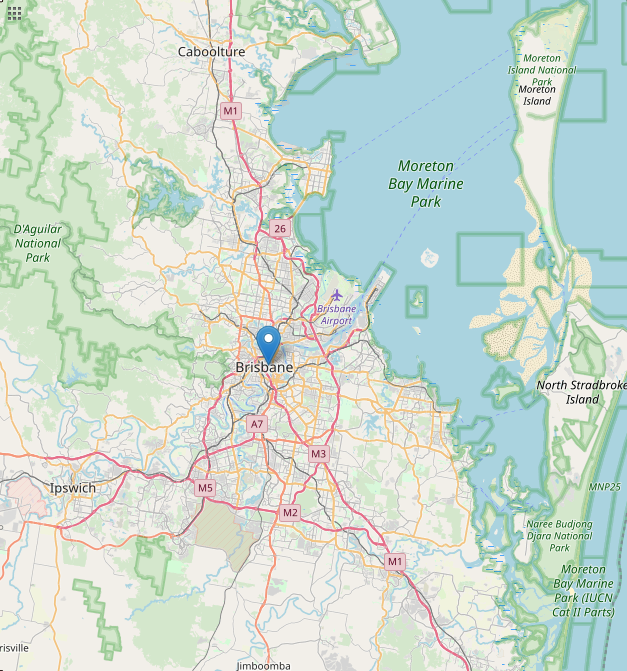
- Interactive map of Caboolture
- Coordinates: 27.085°S 152.9513°E
- Country: Australia
- State: Queensland
- City: Brisbane
- LGA: City of Moreton Bay
- Location: 28.1 km (17.5 mi) NW of Redcliffe; 27.8 km (17.3 mi) N of Strathpine; 47.7 km (29.6 mi) N of Brisbane CBD; 61 km (38 mi) S of Maroochydore
- Established: 1842

Government
  - State electorates: Morayfield; Pumicestone
  - Federal division: Longman

Area
  - Total: 68.7 km^{2} (26.5 sq mi)
- Elevation: 22 m (72 ft)

Population
  - Total: 29,534 (2021 census)
  - Density: 429.9/km^{2} (1,113.4/sq mi)
- Time zone: UTC+10:00 (AEST)
- Postcode: 4510
Localities around Caboolture
| Wamuran | Elimbah | Toorbul |
| Moodlu | Caboolture | Ningi |
| Bellmere | Caboolture South; Morayfield | Beachmere |

Caboolture (/kəˈbʊltʃər/) is a town and suburb in the City of Moreton Bay, Queensland, Australia. It is located on the northern side of the Caboolture River. In the 2021 census, the suburb of Caboolture had a population of 29,534 people.

== Geography ==
Caboolture is a major urban centre of the Moreton Bay local government area. It is located approximately 44 kilometres (27 mi) north of Brisbane, the state capital of Queensland. Caboolture is now considered to be the northernmost urban area of the greater Brisbane metropolitan region within South East Queensland, and it marks the end of the Brisbane suburban commuter railway service along the North Coast railway line.

The urban extent of the town of Caboolture is not formally defined but is generally regarded as including the following suburbs:

- Bellmere
- Caboolture (as a suburb)
- Caboolture South
- Morayfield (northern section, west of Bruce Highway)
- Upper Caboolture

== History ==
=== Indigenous history ===
Duungidjawu (also known as Kabi Kabi, Cabbee, Carbi, Gabi Gabi) is an Australian Aboriginal language spoken on Duungidjawu country. The Duungidjawu language region includes the landscape within the local government boundaries of Somerset Region and the City of Moreton Bay, particularly the towns of Caboolture, Kilcoy, Woodford and Moore.

Gubbi Gubbi (Kabi Kabi, Cabbee, Carbi, Gabi Gabi) is an Australian Aboriginal language spoken on Gubbi Gubbi country. The Gubbi Gubbi language region includes the landscape within the local government boundaries of the Sunshine Coast Region and Gympie Region, particularly the towns of Caloundra, Noosa Heads, Gympie and extending north towards Maryborough and south to Caboolture.

The Gubbi Gubbi people are the traditional custodians of the area now known as Caboolture. The name Kabultur is derived from the Yugarabul dialect meaning "place of the carpet snake". The Gubbi Gubbi people harvested bush food, fresh water mussels, oysters, fish, and some game animals, moving around the land to take best advantage of seasonally-available produce.

Towards the south of Caboolture is the Yugarabul traditional Aboriginal country of the Brisbane and surrounding regions.

=== 19th century ===
The Caboolture area was colonised by European people in 1842 when the land around the Moreton Bay penal colony was opened up to free settlers.

By the mid-1860s the local pastoralists were experimenting with sugar cane and cotton. In 1867, a tiny settlement was established as a supply and trading centre for the settlers in the area and to service the needs of miners trekking from Brisbane to the goldfields near Gympie. The local shire was constituted in 1879 and in 1888 the railway line from Brisbane was opened.

Caboolture Post Office opened on 1 September 1869.

Settlement in Caboolture was accelerated with the discovery of gold at Gympie. In 1868, the town was used as a stop-over point by the Cobb and Co coach service connecting Brisbane, Gympie and Maryborough. This function continued with the rail link established in 1888.

Caboolture State School opened on 4 August 1873. In 1890 it became Caboolture South State School. In 1908 it became Morayfield State School.

The foundation stone of St Laurence's Anglican Church was laid on Saturday 26 January 1889 by Mrs W.G. Geddes in a service conducted by Canon Glennie and Archdeacon Matthews. Mr W.G. Geddes, one of the oldest settlers in Caboolture had donated the land. It was consecrated in 1959. It was re-built and re-dedicated in 1982.

Caboolture North State School opened on 25 November 1889. In June 1912 it became Caboolture State School. Between 1940 and 1960 it was called Caboolture Rural State School. It had a secondary department from 1955 to 1961, after which a separate secondary school was established.

=== 20th century ===
St Columban's College, Caboolture: On 5 December 1926 Roman Catholic Archbishop James Duhig laid the foundation stone for St Columban's College at "Highlands", 451 Sandgate Road, Albion in Brisbane. The school officially opened on Sunday 29 January 1928. It was a school for boys operated by the Christian Brothers. In 1985 the Christian Brothers passed the management of the college to the Brisbane Diocese. This triggered a number of changes, a phasing out the primary school to focus on secondary schooling. In 1996, the school accepted enrolments from girls and in 1997 the school relocated to Caboolture.

St Peter's Catholic School opened on 30 January 1951 in the parish church (now Mary McKillop Hall). It was initially operated by the Sisters of St Joseph of the Sacred Heart under principal Sister Juan McGrath, assisted by Sister Timothy and Sister Salome.

Caboolture State High School opened on 23 January 1961, replacing the secondary department that operated at Caboolture State School from 1955 to 1960.

Caboolture Special School opened in January 1980 with 50 students who had previously been in the Special Education Unit at Caboolture State School.

Caboolture East State School opened on 29 January 1980.

St Michael's College opened on 25 January 1983 with 4 students in a small farmhouse. It is associated with the Abbey Church of Christ the King, an Orthodox Catholic Church of Christ the King.

St Paul's Lutheran Primary School opened in 1985.

Tullawong State School opened on 1 February 1993.

Tullawong State High School opened in January 1994.

Before the 2008 local government amalgamations in Queensland, Caboolture Shire Council governed the area.

Caboolture Christian School opened in 1998. In 2009 it was renamed Australian Christian College – Moreton.

Harmony Montessori School opened in 1998.

=== 21st century ===
Grace Lutheran College Caboolture opened in 2008 adjacent to St Paul's Lutheran Primary School. The college is campus of Grace Lutheran College at Rothwell.

The Caboolture Library opened in 2011.

Pumicestone State School opened in 2017.

As part of the 30th Anniversary of Expo 88 celebration, on 26 October 2018, artist Ken Done unveiled the restoration of his iconic signs made for the Australia pavilion at Expo 88. It had spent the intervening years in a cow paddock beside the Bruce Highway at Deception Bay. The restoration was undertaken by the Caboolture Historical Village where they will remain on display.

Lee Street State Special School opened in 2020.

== Demographics ==
In the 2016 census, the suburb of Caboolture had a population of 26,433 people.

In the 2021 census, the suburb of Caboolture had a population of 29,543 people. The median age of residents is 36 years. Crime rates per 100,000 persons in Moreton Bay North (which includes Caboolture) is lower than that of Ipswich, Logan and Toowoomba regions.

== Heritage listings ==
Caboolture has a number of heritage-listed sites, including:

- Lagoon Creek Pumping Station, Buckle Street

== Education ==
=== State schools ===
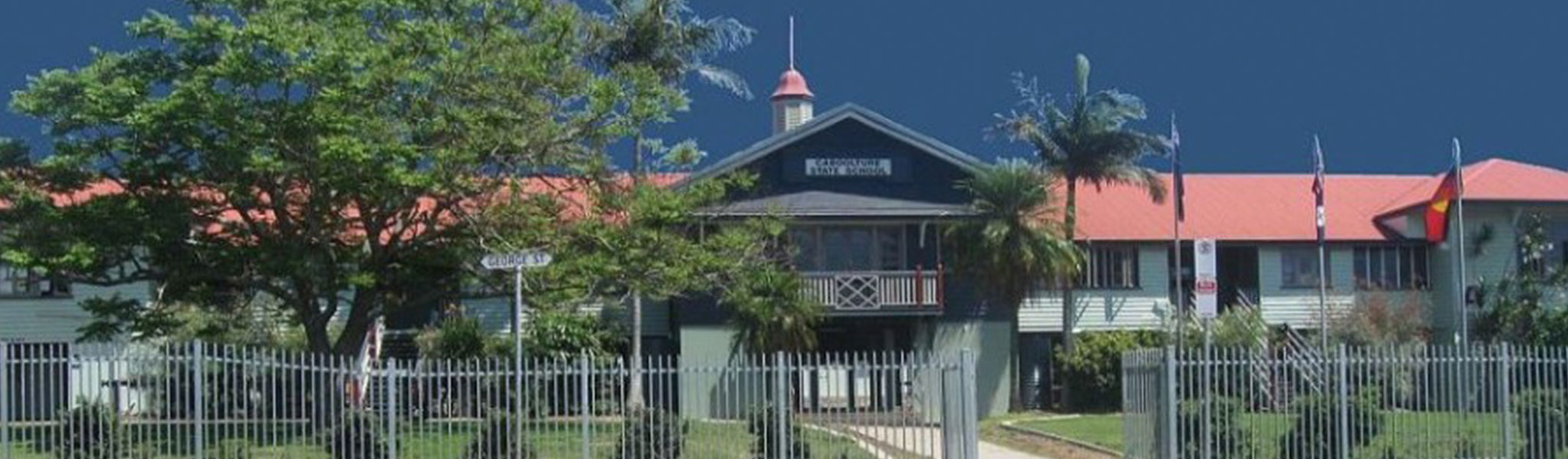
Caboolture State School, 2025

Caboolture State School is a government primary (Prep–6) school for boys and girls at 12 George Street (27.0825°S 152.9487°E). In 2017, the school had an enrolment of 558 students with 41 teachers (37 full-time equivalent) and 39 non-teaching staff (26 full-time equivalent). It includes a special education program.

Caboolture East State School is a government primary (Early Childhood to Year 6) school for boys and girls at 44 Manley Street (27.0775°S 152.9609°E). It includes a special education program and an early childhood developmental program. In 2017, the school had an enrolment of 624 students with 54 teachers (49 full-time equivalent) and 54 non-teaching staff (34 full-time equivalent).

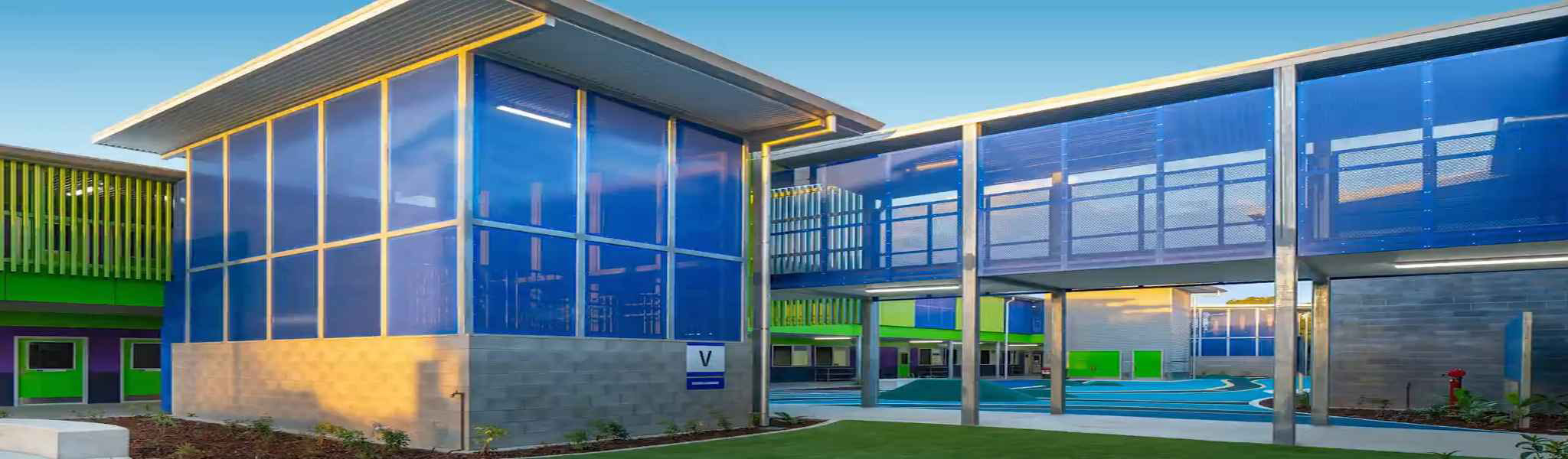
Pumicestone State School, 2025

Pumicestone State School is a government primary (Prep–6) school for boys and girls at 75 Cottrill Road (27.058°S 152.9565°E). It includes a special education program. In 2017, the school had an enrolment of 380 students with 27 teachers (25 full-time equivalent) and 17 non-teaching staff (13 full-time equivalent).

Tullawong State School is a government primary (Prep–6) school for boys and girls at 60–94 Smiths Road (27.0699°S 152.9327°E). It includes a special education program. In 2017, the school had an enrolment of 757 students with 57 teachers (52 full-time equivalent) and 47 non-teaching staff (27 full-time equivalent).

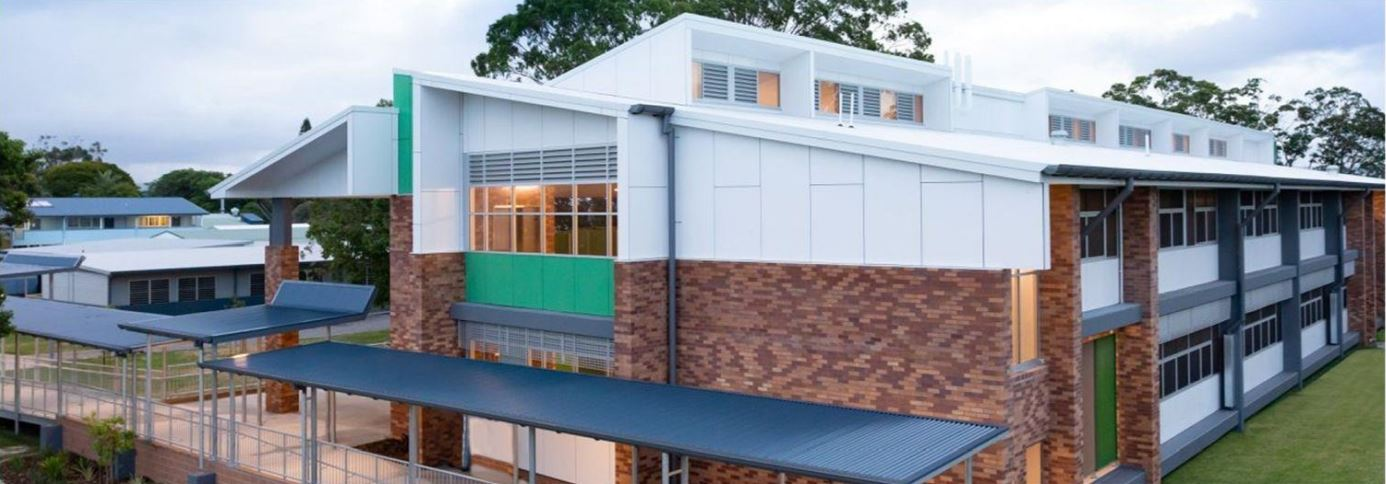
Caboolture State High School, 2025

Caboolture State High School is a government secondary (7–12) school for boys and girls at 7–69 Lee Street (27.0841°S 152.9610°E). It includes a special education program. In 2017, the school had an enrolment of 1248 students with 110 teachers (107 full-time equivalent) and 57 non-teaching staff (44 full-time equivalent).

Tullawong State High School is a government secondary (7–12) school for boys and girls at 22-70 Del Rosso Road (27.0705°S 152.9289°E). It includes a special education program. In 2017, the school had an enrolment of 912 students with 86 teachers (80 full-time equivalent) and 43 non-teaching staff (33 full-time equivalent).

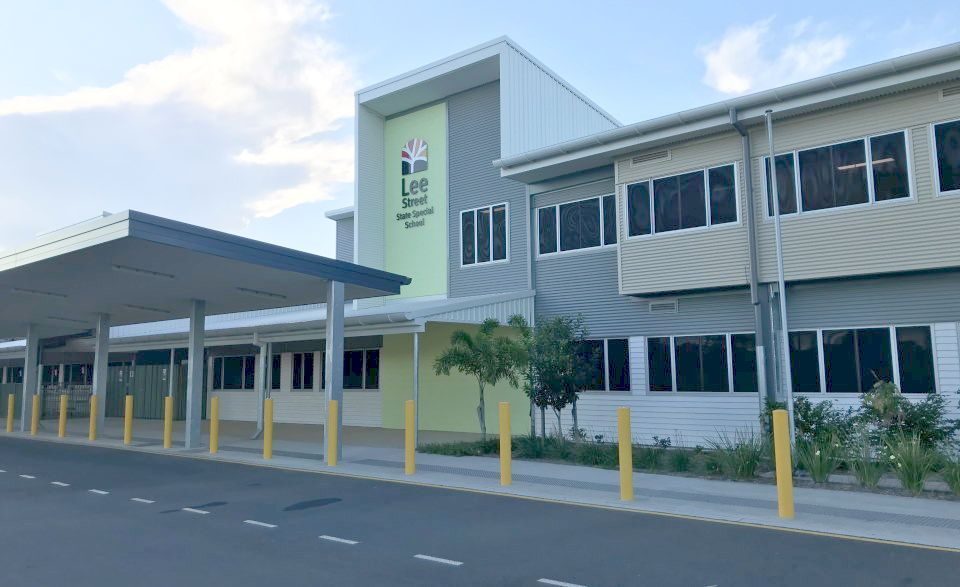
Lee Street State Special School, 2025

Lee Street State Special School is a government special education secondary school for boys and girls. It operates from the campus of Caboolture State High School at 7–69 Lee Street (27.0848°S 152.9636°E).

=== Private schools ===
Alta-1 College is a private secondary (11–12) school for boys and girls at 94 Parish Road (27.0710°S 152.9415°E). In 2017, the school had an enrolment of 32 students with 3 teachers (2 full-time equivalent) and 5 non-teaching staff (4 full-time equivalent).

Australian Christian College – Moreton is a private primary and secondary (Prep–12) school for boys and girls at 34 Cottrill Road (27.0576°S 152.9525°E). In 2017, the school had an enrolment of 1173 students with 47 teachers and 22 non-teaching staff (16 full-time equivalent).

Caboolture Montessori School is a private primary (Prep–6) school for boys and girls at 200 Old Gympie Road (27.0554°S 152.9392°E). In 2017, the school had an enrolment of 139 students with 14 teachers (12 full-time equivalent) and 24 non-teaching staff (16 full-time equivalent).

Grace Lutheran College Caboolture is a private secondary (7–12) campus at 129 Toohey Street (27.0743°S 152.9381°E) of Grace Lutheran College at Rothwell. It operates in partnership with St Paul's Lutheran Primary School.

Horizons College is a private secondary (9–12) school for boys and girls at 2 King Street (27.0856°S 152.9541°E). In 2017, the school had an enrolment of 110 students with 14 teachers (11 full-time equivalent) and 11 non-teaching staff (10 full-time equivalent).

St Columban's College is a Catholic secondary (7–12) school for boys and girls at 100 McKean Street (27.0790°S 152.9627°E). In 2017, the school had an enrolment of 1004 students with 83 teachers (79 full-time equivalent) and 67 non-teaching staff (43 full-time equivalent).

St Michael's College is a private primary (Prep–6) school for boys and girls at Jan-63 The Abbey Place (27.0694°S 153.0174°E). In 2017, the school had an enrolment of 335 students with 25 teachers (22 full-time equivalent) and 28 non-teaching staff (19 full-time equivalent).

St Paul's Lutheran Primary School is a private primary (Prep–6) school for boys and girls at 55 Smith Road (27.0720°S 152.9328°E). It operates in collaboration with Grace Lutheran College Caboolture. In 2017, the school had an enrolment of 356 students with 23 teachers (21 full-time equivalent) and 28 non-teaching staff (19 full-time equivalent).

St Peter's Catholic Primary School is a Catholic primary (Prep–6) school for boys and girls at 30 Beerburrum Road (27.0803°S 152.9518°E). In 2017, the school had an enrolment of 677 students with 42 teachers (38 full-time equivalent) and 27 non-teaching staff (18 full-time equivalent).

== Amenities ==
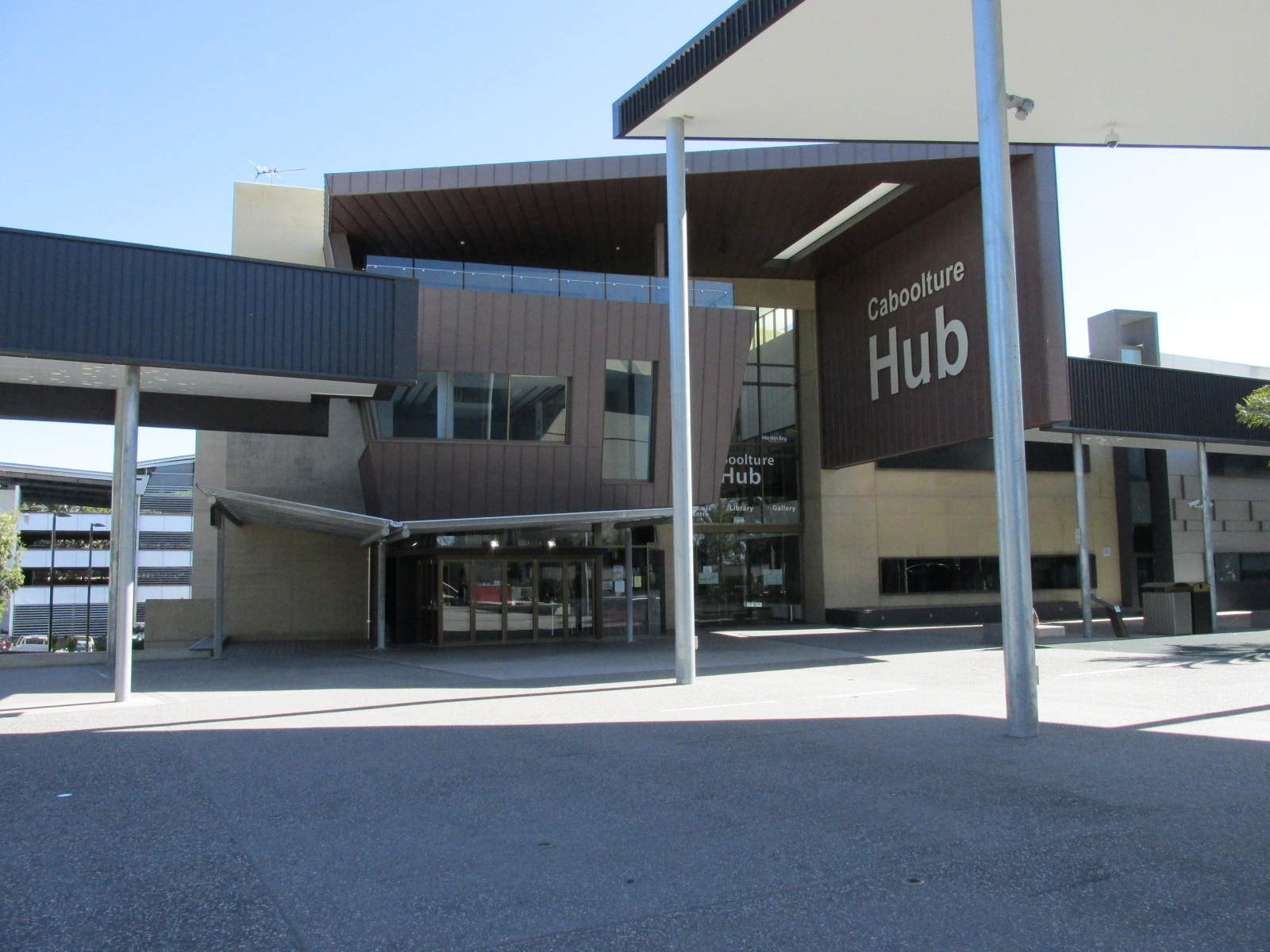
Caboolture Hub building

The Moreton Bay City Council operates a public library, memorial hall, customer service centre and an art gallery at 4 Hasking Street. The Hub which houses the library, art gallery, and other amenities, has fifteen event and business spaces. The Caboolture Regional Art Gallery has a AAA rating, which makes it an international standard exhibition space.

The Caboolture branch of the Queensland Country Women's Association meets at 10 George Street. It is one of the oldest in Queensland, having commenced in 1929.

St Laurence's Anglican Church holds regular services at 165 King Street (27.0838°S 152.9392°E).

Caboolture Uniting Church is at 2-8 Smiths Road (corner King Street, 27.0776°S 152.9314°E). It is part of the Caboolture Region Uniting Church.

New Hope Church meets at the Senior Citizens Centre at 24 Hasking Street (27.0833°S 152.9493°E). It is part of the Wesleyan Methodist Church.

== Sport ==
Caboolture versus Coolum regional cricket match

Caboolture's senior sporting teams predominantly play in the respective Sunshine Coast competitions. The suburb's cricket club are reigning Sunshine Coast Cricket Association first division premiers. The rugby union club have rejoined the Sunshine Coast Rugby Union competition after a few years in Queensland Suburban rugby's Barber Cup.

== Events and attractions ==
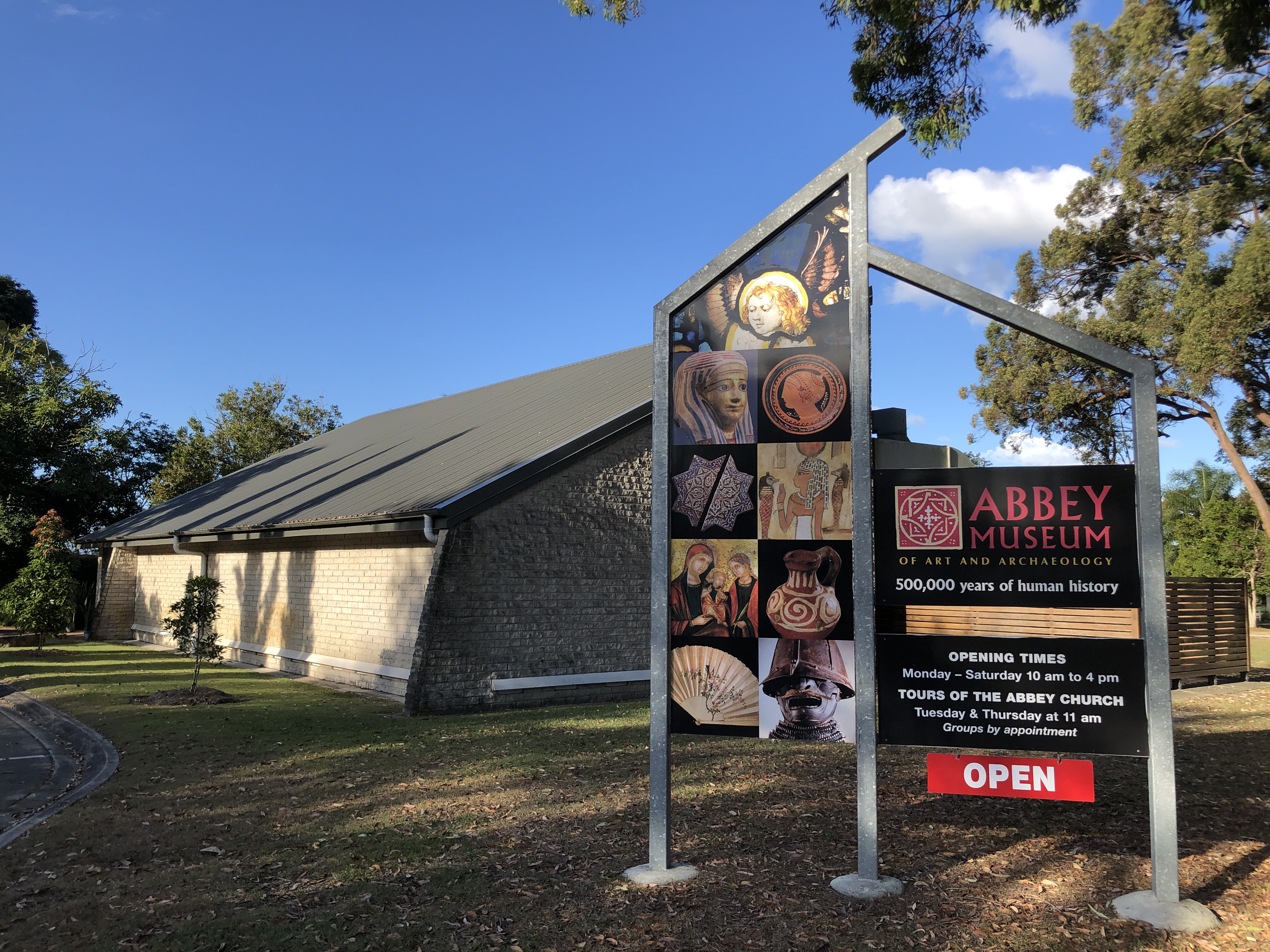
Abbey Museum of Art and Archaeology

Caboolture Festival 2023 will be held during the month of April featuring a range of events. The Caboolture Country Markets are held every Sunday during winter.

Local attractions include the Caboolture Regional Art Gallery, the Abbey Museum of Art and Archaeology, Centenary Lakes, Caboolture Historical Village and Woodfordia.

The Caboolture Airfield is also home to the Caboolture Warplane and Heritage Museum. Included in their display is a collection of warbird and other vintage aircraft in flying condition. Currently, the collection includes a P-51D Mustang, SNJ and Winjeel as well as a French built World War I Nieuport 17 fighter, as well as displays of aviation memorabilia and aircraft engines.

Caboolture hosted an annual country music festival and a ute muster each year, called the Urban Country Music Festival. The event was cancelled in 2016.

== Transport ==
Caboolture is a regional transport hub. With its connections across the Great Dividing Range via the D'Aguilar Highway, easy highway access to Brisbane and the Sunshine Coast via the Bruce Highway, and the Caboolture–Bribie Island Road to Bribie Island.

Caboolture railway station is the terminus for QR Citytrain's Caboolture railway line, as well as being a major stop on the North Coast railway line. Citytrain operates regular services to Brisbane, in addition to interurban services to Nambour and Gympie.

The 651 local loop bus service provides transport throughout the northern portion of the suburb connecting it to other bus and train services at Caboolture railway station, bus services at Morayfield Bus Station and train services at Morayfield railway station. The 655 service runs a loop in the eastern portion of the suburb proving a bus connection to Caboolture Hospital. Bus routes 653 and 654 provides a connection to Caboolture South and Bellmere with a connection to train services at Morayfield railway station and bus services at Morayfield Bus Station. Bus route 657 travels to the northern portion of the suburb providing connections to Caboolture railway station. Route 652 provides a bus connection to Beachmere. Buses 640 and 643 travel from Bribie Island. Route 640 connects Ningi, Bellara and Woorim and 643 connects Godwin Beach, Sandstone Point and Bellara. The 660 bus also travels to Caboolture Bus Station providing connections to Redcliffe, Morayfield, Burpengary and Deception Bay. Bus 9999 is a service that operates from Donnybrook and Toorbul on Thursday morning and afternoon that provides connection to Caboolture and Morayfield Bus Station. Kangaroo Bus Lines operates a rail bus on weekdays between Caboolture and Nambour as route 649 to relieve congestion on the North Coast railway line north of Beerburrum. There is also a bus service from Kilcoy through the QConnect network under route number 895. It services Woodford, D'Agulair, Wamuran and terminates at the Morayfield Bus Station.

== Notable people ==
- Paul Aiton, Papua New Guinea rugby league captain
- Glen Boss, jockey who has won the Melbourne Cup three times
- Ken Day, rugby league player
- Corey Horsburgh, rugby league player for the Canberra Raiders.
- Andrew Lofthouse, newsreader
- Lily Postlethwaite, Australian rules footballer
- Rod Pampling, PGA Tour professional golfer
- Keith Urban, singer who was born in New Zealand, and moved to Caboolture, aged two years
