= Division of Longman =

Australian federal electoral division

Coordinates: 27.014°S 152.895°E

Longman Australian House of Representatives Division
- Interactive map of boundaries since the 2019 federal election
- Created: 1994
- MP: Terry Young
- Party: Liberal National Party of Queensland
- Namesake: Irene Longman
- Electors: 142,810 (2025)
- Area: 1,237 km^{2} (477.6 sq mi)
- Demographic: Provincial

The Division of Longman is an Australian electoral division in Queensland between Brisbane and the Sunshine Coast.

== History ==
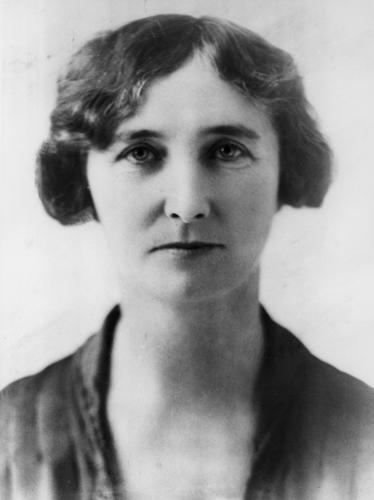
Irene Longman, the division's namesake

The division was first proclaimed in 1994. The division is named after Irene Longman, the first female member of the Parliament of Queensland and the third woman elected to a parliament in Australia.

Wyatt Roy, who represented the electorate between 2010 and 2016, was Australia's youngest ever parliamentarian elected at the time.

== Boundaries ==
Since 1984, federal electoral division boundaries in Australia have been determined at redistributions by a redistribution committee appointed by the Australian Electoral Commission. Redistributions occur for the boundaries of divisions in a particular state, and they occur every seven years, or sooner if a state's representation entitlement changes or when divisions of a state are malapportioned.

Longman covers much of the City of Moreton Bay, including the former Caboolture Shire and some of the former Pine Rivers.

Its boundaries include Beachmere, Bribie Island, Burpengary, Dakabin, Donnybrook, Kallangur, Ningi, Toorbul, Caboolture, Caboolture South, Morayfield, Wamuran, Woodford and Narangba.

== Members ==
Image	Member	Party	Term	Notes
	Mal Brough (1961–)	Liberal	2 March 1996 – 24 November 2007	Served as minister under Howard. Lost seat. Later elected to the Division of Fisher in 2013
	Jon Sullivan (1950–2021)	Labor	24 November 2007 – 21 August 2010	Previously held the Legislative Assembly of Queensland seat of Caboolture. Lost seat
	Wyatt Roy (1990–)	Liberal (Note: Member of the Liberal National Party of Queensland sitting with the federal parliamentary Liberal Party.)	21 August 2010 – 2 July 2016	Lost seat. Was the youngest person ever elected to the House of Representatives
	Susan Lamb (1972–)	Labor	2 July 2016 – 10 May 2018	Election results declared void due to dual citizenship. Subsequently, re-elected. Lost seat
	Susan Lamb (1972–)	Labor	28 July 2018 – 18 May 2019	Election results declared void due to dual citizenship. Subsequently, re-elected. Lost seat
	Terry Young (1968–)	Liberal	18 May 2019 – present	Incumbent

== Election results ==
2025 Australian federal election: Longman
Party	Candidate	Votes	%	±%
Liberal National	Terry Young	43,960	36.05	−2.12
Labor	Rhiannyn Douglas	43,238	35.46	+3.96
One Nation	Peter McCasker	12,062	9.89	+1.64
Greens	Gabrielle Unverzagt	12,014	9.85	+2.62
Trumpet of Patriots	Benjamin Wood	5,985	4.91	+4.91
Family First	Malachi Hearne (disendorsed)	4,670	3.83	+3.83
Total formal votes		121,929	96.06	+1.05
Informal votes		4,998	3.94	−1.05
Turnout		126,927	88.92	+0.75
Two-party-preferred result
Liberal National	Terry Young	61,099	50.11	−2.97
Labor	Rhiannyn Douglas	60,830	49.89	+2.97
Liberal National hold		Swing	−2.97	
