= Electoral district of Glass House =

State electoral district of Queensland, Australia

Glass House Queensland—Legislative Assembly
- Map of the electoral district of Glass House, 2017
- State: Queensland
- Dates current: 1986–1992; 2001–present
- MP: Andrew Powell
- Party: Liberal National
- Namesake: Glass House Mountains
- Electors: 34,748 (2020)
- Area: 1,768 km^{2} (682.6 sq mi)
- Demographic: Provincial
- Coordinates: 26°52′S 152°50′E
Electorates around Glass House:
| Nanango | Gympie | Nicklin |
| Nanango | Glass House | Caloundra |
| Pine Rivers | Kurwongbah | Pumicestone; Morayfield |

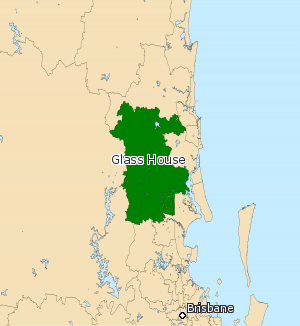
2008 Map of Glass House

Glass House is an electoral district of the Legislative Assembly in the Australian state of Queensland.

The electorate is based mostly on the hinterland areas of the Sunshine Coast and north of Caboolture, it stretches north to Witta, south to the northern outskirts of Caboolture and west to Conondale.

== Members for Glass House ==
First incarnation (1986–1992)
| Member | Party | Term |
|---|---|---|
| Bill Newton | National | 1986–1989 |
| Jon Sullivan | Labor | 1989–1992 |
Second incarnation (2001–present)
| Member | Party | Term |
| Carolyn Male | Labor | 2001–2009 |
| Andrew Powell | Liberal National | 2009–present |

== Election results ==
2024 Queensland state election: Glass House
| Party | Candidate | Votes | % | ±% |
|---|---|---|---|---|
| Liberal National | Andrew Powell | 15,149 | 45.42 | +5.12 |
| Labor | Humphrey Caspersz | 7,969 | 23.89 | −8.21 |
| Greens | Andrew McLean | 4,009 | 12.02 | −0.88 |
| One Nation | Adam Farr | 3,668 | 11.00 | +0.70 |
| Legalise Cannabis | Timothy Hallcroft | 1,696 | 5.08 | +5.08 |
| Family First | Bronwen Bolitho | 865 | 2.59 | +2.59 |
| Total formal votes | | 33,356 | 95.66 | −0.91 |
| Informal votes | | 1,515 | 4.34 | +0.91 |
| Turnout | | 34,871 | 89.77 | −0.97 |
Two-party-preferred result
| Liberal National | Andrew Powell | 20,074 | 60.18 | +8.58 |
| Labor | Humphrey Caspersz | 13,282 | 39.82 | −8.58 |
| Liberal National hold | | Swing | +8.58 | |

Primary vote results in Glass House (Parties that have never gotten 5% of the vote are omitted)
National/Liberal National

Liberal

Labor
Greens
One Nation
Palmer United/United Australia Party
Family First
Katter's Australian
Independent
View source data.
Two-candidate-preferred vote results in Glass House View source data.

2020 Queensland state election: Glass House
| Party | Candidate | Votes | % | ±% |
|---|---|---|---|---|
| Liberal National | Andrew Powell | 12,265 | 40.28 | +4.76 |
| Labor | Brent Hampstead | 9,753 | 32.03 | +5.77 |
| Greens | Andrew McLean | 3,937 | 12.93 | +0.05 |
| One Nation | Graeme Campbell | 3,134 | 10.29 | −12.38 |
| Informed Medical Options | Laressa McCoy | 1,015 | 3.33 | +3.33 |
| United Australia | James McDonald | 343 | 1.13 | +1.13 |
| Total formal votes | | 30,447 | 96.57 | +0.14 |
| Informal votes | | 1,083 | 3.43 | −0.14 |
| Turnout | | 31,530 | 90.74 | +1.30 |
Two-party-preferred result
| Liberal National | Andrew Powell | 15,706 | 51.58 | −1.84 |
| Labor | Brent Hampstead | 14,741 | 48.42 | +1.84 |
| Liberal National hold | | Swing | −1.84 | |
