= Morayfield State School =

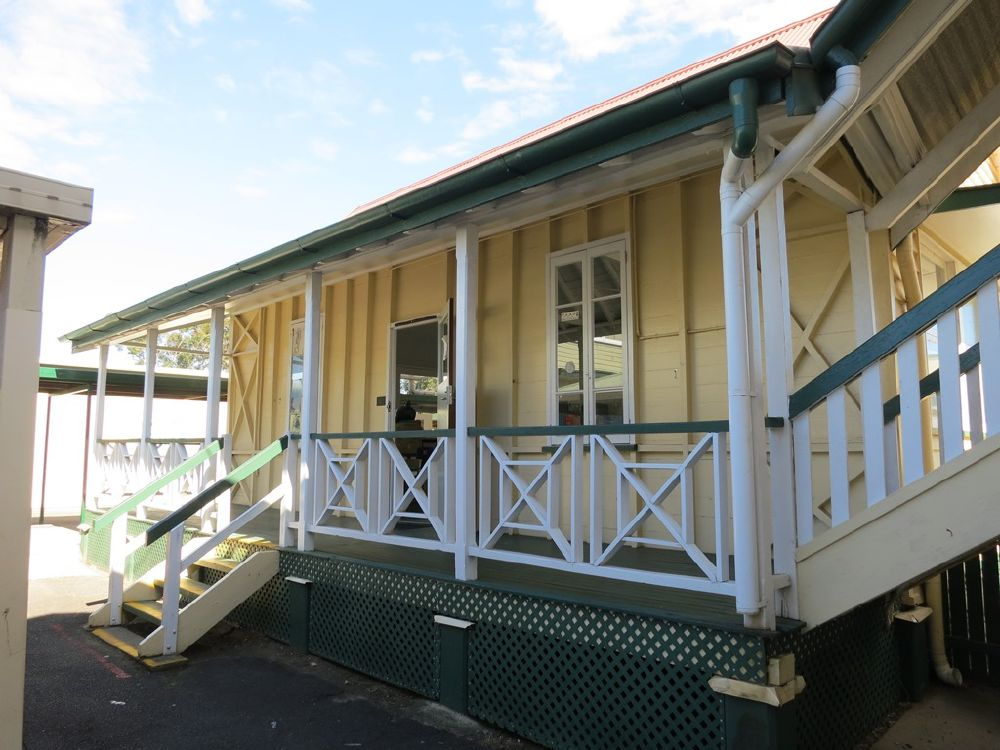
- Morayfield State School, original building, 2014

- Location within Queensland
- 27.1064°S 152.9471°E
- Location: 196–230 Morayfield Road, Morayfield, City of Moreton Bay, Queensland, Australia

History
- Built: 1873, 1903
- Built for: Department of Public Instruction

Site notes
- Architect: Richard George Suter

Queensland Heritage Register
- Official name: Morayfield State School; Caboolture National School; Caboolture South State School
- Type: state heritage
- Designated: 10 October 2014
- Reference no.: 602839
- Type: Education, research, scientific facility: School-state
- Theme: Educating Queenslanders: Providing primary schooling
- Builders: Robert Monteith, Thomas Heron

Morayfield State School is a heritage-listed state school at 196–230 Morayfield Road, Morayfield, City of Moreton Bay, Queensland, Australia. It was designed by Richard George Suter and built in 1873 by Robert Monteith. It is also known as Caboolture National School and Caboolture South State School. It was added to the Queensland Heritage Register on 10 October 2014.

== History ==
Morayfield State School opened in 1873 as Caboolture National School within a small timber building designed by architect Richard George Suter. It was built on a large site south of the Caboolture River to service the sparse but growing rural population. As settlement increased, the school expanded to have many other structures and landscape elements, including a play shed (1903) and shade trees. The school has been in continuous operation since its establishment and, as such, has been a focus for the local community as a place for important social and cultural activity.

The former Moreton Bay Penal Colony was opened to free settlers in 1842. Initially, thanks to river access, the Caboolture area was used for timber-getting, especially red cedar. In the 1860s it developed as an agricultural area, and was one of the first districts in Queensland where sugarcane was grown on a substantial scale. Queensland's first commercially milled sugar was produced in 1864 at Ormiston, southeast of Brisbane, by Captain Louis Hope. George Raff, a prominent Brisbane merchant and politician, began planting sugar in the mid-1860s on his plantation southeast of Caboolture, and south of the Caboolture River, called "Moray Field" (Morayfield Plantation). Raff was successful and expanded to a substantial operation. Raff's plantation produced sugar until the mid-1880s; another local sugar plantation, also south of the river and operating from the mid-1860s to 1872, was "Oaklands", (Oaklands Sugar Mill) established by Captain Claudius Buchanan Whish. Both plantations used South Sea Islander labour.

Caboolture was initially only a stop on the road to the Gympie goldfield from the late 1860s, but growth in the area was sufficient to warrant the establishment of a government school, "for the convenience of the farmers" families up the river, and the children of the employees at Mr Raff's plantation. In April 1872 the Brisbane Courier advertised the Queensland Government's reservation of 41 acres (17 ha) - adjacent to the Gympie Road between Brisbane and Caboolture - for the Caboolture National School. Although the site selected was 2.5 kilometres (1.6 mi) south of Caboolture, and south of the Caboolture River, it had the advantage of being next to a permanent water source – the lagoons on Sheep Station Creek.

Caboolture National School was established as one of an expanding network of state-run primary schools. The provision of state-administered education was important to the colonial governments of Australia. In 1848 the New South Wales Government established National Schools. This was continued by the Queensland Government after the colony's separation in 1859. The Education Act 1860 established the Queensland Board of General Education and began to standardise curriculum, teacher training, and facilities. The State Education Act 1875 provided for the further key initiatives of free, compulsory and secular primary education and established the Department of Public Instruction to administer the Act. This move standardised the provision of education and, despite difficulties, colonial educators achieved a remarkable feat in bringing basic literacy to most Queensland children by 1900.

The establishment of schools was considered an essential step in the development of early communities and integral to their success. Locals often donated land and labour for a school's construction and the school community contributed to maintenance and development. Schools became a major community focus for social interaction, a symbol of progress and a source of pride with enduring connections formed with past pupils, parents and teachers. The inclusion of war memorials and halls used for community purposes reinforced these connections together with fetes, markets, public holiday celebrations, school break-up days, fundraisers, polling days, sporting events, reunions, and dances, all held within the schools' buildings and grounds.

From the 1860s until the 1960s, Queensland school buildings were predominantly timber framed, taking advantage of the material's abundance in the state and the high number of builders skilled in its use. This also allowed for easy and economical construction and enabled the government to provide facilities in remote areas. Due to the standardisation of facilities, schools across the state were developed in distinctly similar ways and became complexes of typical components. These components included: the teaching building/s, the school yard, the sports oval, the head teacher's residence, and a variety of landscape elements such as sporting facilities or play equipment, playsheds, gardens and trees.

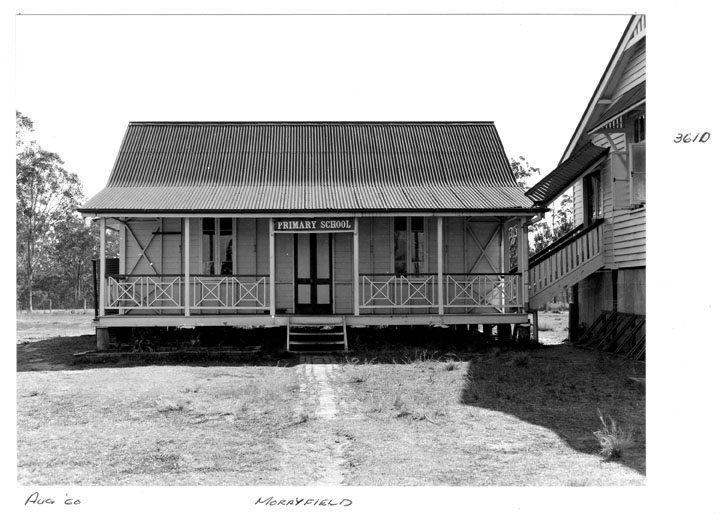
Morayfield State School, 1960

For the Caboolture National School (Caboolture State School from 1875), Robert Monteith's construction tender of £265 for erection of a teaching building and a head teacher's residence was accepted by the government in October 1872. Both buildings were completed in 1873 and the Caboolture National School opened 4 August 1873. By December 1873, 34 children were on the school roll.

The Board of General Education preferred that national school buildings were single storey, but had no other architectural stipulations. Consequently, the buildings varied depending on the architect responsible. The teaching building at Caboolture National School (designated as Block C in 2014) was designed by Richard Suter (1827–94), a private architect commissioned from 1865 by the Board of General Education to design school buildings. From 1868, Suter was responsible for most of the Board's buildings. Although Suter's Brisbane school buildings were of brick construction, in rural areas he designed timber-framed school buildings. In his timber school designs, Suter incorporated an "outside studding" construction technique he was developing, whereby a building with timber stud framing was clad only internally, creating a distinctive exterior of exposed framing similar in appearance to half-timbered construction. Suter is credited with being the first to use this technique in Queensland. Outside studding for school architecture was continued by Suter's successors for another 50 years.

As in other Australian colonies, the Queensland Government developed standard plans for its school buildings to help to ensure consistency and economy. Prior to, and during Suter's first years, schools were individually designed but conformed to the space requirements set by the Board. In 1869 a "recommended plan" for provisional schools was created by Suter that was generic and could be used on any site. It was a lowset structure with gable roof, rectangular in plan with a small porch. An "improved plan" developed in 1873 addressed criticisms by Inspectors that the heat inside classrooms was "unbearable". It consisted of a single large room with a front and back verandah, providing weather protection and sheltered play and teaching space. It was the beginning of a distinctive design, where the circulation to classrooms was via a verandah, continuing until at least the 1960s.

Although Suter did not intend this plan to be used broadly, the Board of Education, who were faced with an increasing population and limited budget, disseminated it throughout Queensland. As a result, Suter's designs had wide distribution. This had considerable impact on the spread of outside studding as a building technique in Queensland and may have been the main influence in its quick acceptance and use as a vernacular building form throughout the colony.

The reuse of designs diminished the need to pay Suter additional architectural fees and the relationship between Suter and the government became strained. Suter continued as approved architect until 1875 when he was replaced. Around 65 timber school buildings were constructed to Suter's standard type. Of these, only three (Waterford State School, Morayfield State School, and Mutdapilly State School) are largely intact.

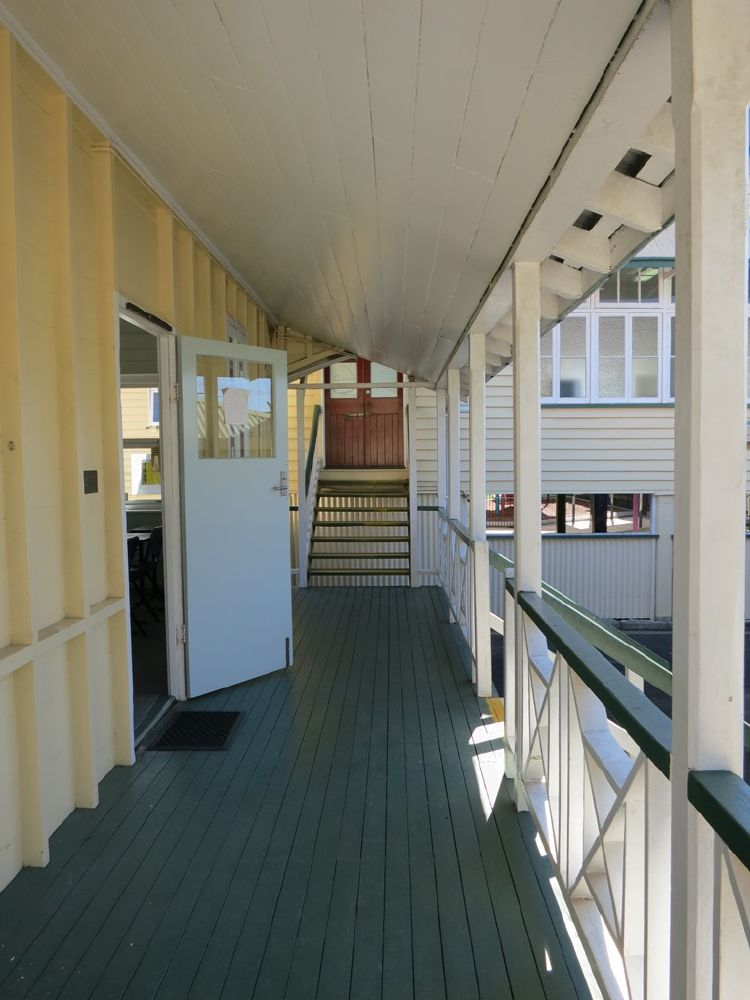
Eastern verandah, 2014

The classroom building at Caboolture National School was typical of Suter's improved plan. It was a lowset timber building with outside studding. It faced east with a verandah on the east and west sides and accommodated one large room 30 by 16 feet (9.1 m × 4.9 m). The gable roof was clad with hardwood timber shingles and the interior was lined with pine tongue-and-groove timber boards. The timber roof framing was exposed internally and the windows were small and few in number.

Suter's standard designs were continually refined by his successors in response to changing needs and educational philosophy. Suter's designs were not without problems - in particular, they were criticised for lack of ventilation. Later school architects focussed intently on improving climate control, lighting, and ventilation and were particularly innovative in their responses.

During the 1870s and early 1880s the Caboolture/Morayfield area continued to develop as an agricultural region with a gradual increase in population. The Caboolture Divisional Board (later Caboolture Shire Council) was established in 1879. In 1876 and 1885 there were unsuccessful calls to have the school moved north of the river to Caboolture, which was now more populous than Morayfield. This may have been because a wharf was located on the north bank of the river. In 1888 the North Coast railway line to Brisbane was constructed, with its terminus in North Caboolture, leading to the establishment of North Caboolture State School in 1889. Caboolture was chosen as the terminus, rather than Morayfield, because the water supply at Lagoon Creek was considered more suitable for locomotives. The Caboolture State School was renamed Caboolture South State School in 1889 and later Morayfield State School in 1907.

Building work continued at Caboolture South State School. By c. 1900 the rear verandah of the Suter building had been part-enclosed to form a hat room, a typical alteration to school buildings. Both ends of the rear verandah were semi-enclosed hat rooms by 1933.

In 1903 the school committee applied to the Department of Public Instruction to build a playshed and it was completed later that year. The local community contributed one third of the cost.

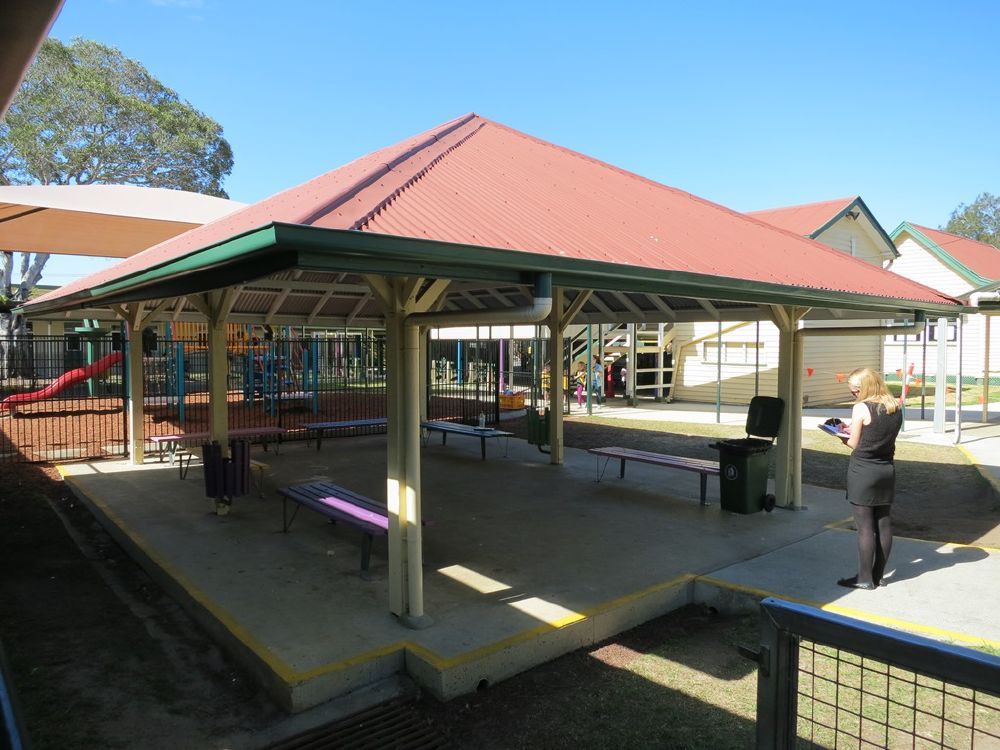
Playshed, 2014

The Queensland education system recognised the importance of play in the school curriculum and, as well as classrooms, they provided plans for playsheds; free-standing shelters that provided covered play space and were often used for unofficial teaching space when needed. They were timber-framed structures, generally open on all sides, although they were sometimes partially enclosed with timber boards or corrugated galvanised iron sheets. The hipped (or less frequently, gabled) roofs were clad with timber shingles or corrugated iron and they had an earth or decomposed granite floor. Fixed timber seating ran between the perimeter posts. Playsheds were a typical addition to state schools across Queensland between c. 1880s and the 1950s. They were built to standard designs that ranged in size relative to student numbers. School sites were typically cleared of all vegetation and the provision of all-weather outdoor space was needed. The playshed at Caboolture South State School was built to a standard design by builder Thomas Heron for £44.10. It was a timber framed, open-sided structure, 24 by 16 feet (7.3 m × 4.9 m), with 6 posts supporting a hipped roof and was built to the north of the Suter building.

The growth of Morayfield remained limited until well into the late-twentieth century, so only minor increases in student accommodation were needed. In 1930 local industries included citrus growing, poultry farming and dairying, and Morayfield railway station was fairly isolated, with only a sawmill and a few residences nearby. At this time Morayfield State School had 40 pupils. In 1933 a new highset timber building, comprising one classroom, was constructed just north of the Suter building. This building (Block A) was originally 21 by 18 feet (6.4 m × 5.5 m) with 8-foot (2.4 m) wide verandas to the east and west, and was later extended to the east in the 1950s and 1960s.

Achieving an ideal or even adequate level of natural light in classrooms, without glare, was of critical importance to educators. After 1900 the virtues of maximum natural ventilation and controlled, high-levels of natural light in teaching buildings were extolled and became central to the design and layout of all school buildings. Windows were rearranged and enlarged to provide a greater amount of gentle, southern light into the room. Desks were rearranged so that the light would fall onto students' left sides to avoid throwing shadows onto the pages; this presupposed that all students would be right-handed. The change in philosophy often meant a complete transformation of the fenestration of existing buildings. Interiors became lighter and airier and met with immediate approval from educators. This was a noticeable new direction and the better lit and ventilated form became a characteristic of Queensland schools.

During the 1920s and 1930s alterations were made to the vast majority of older school buildings to upgrade their lighting and ventilation. On a 1933 plan of the Suter building at Morayfield, casement windows are shown in the eastern verandah wall. These would have been added to increase the lighting and ventilation of the interior and were consistent with this education philosophy.

The grounds of the school were developed over time to accommodate outdoor play. The provision of outdoor play space was a result of the early and continuing commitment by the state government to play-based education, particularly in primary school. Across Queensland, trees and gardens were planted as part of beautification of schools. In the 1870s, schools inspector William Boyd was critical of tropical schools and amongst his recommendations was the importance of adding shade trees to playgrounds. Arbor Day celebrations began in Queensland in 1890 and were occurring at Caboolture South State School by 1891. Educationalists believed gardening and Arbor Days instilled in young minds the value of hard work and activity, improved classroom discipline, developed aesthetic tastes, and inspired people to stay on the land. Aesthetically designed gardens were encouraged by regional inspectors.

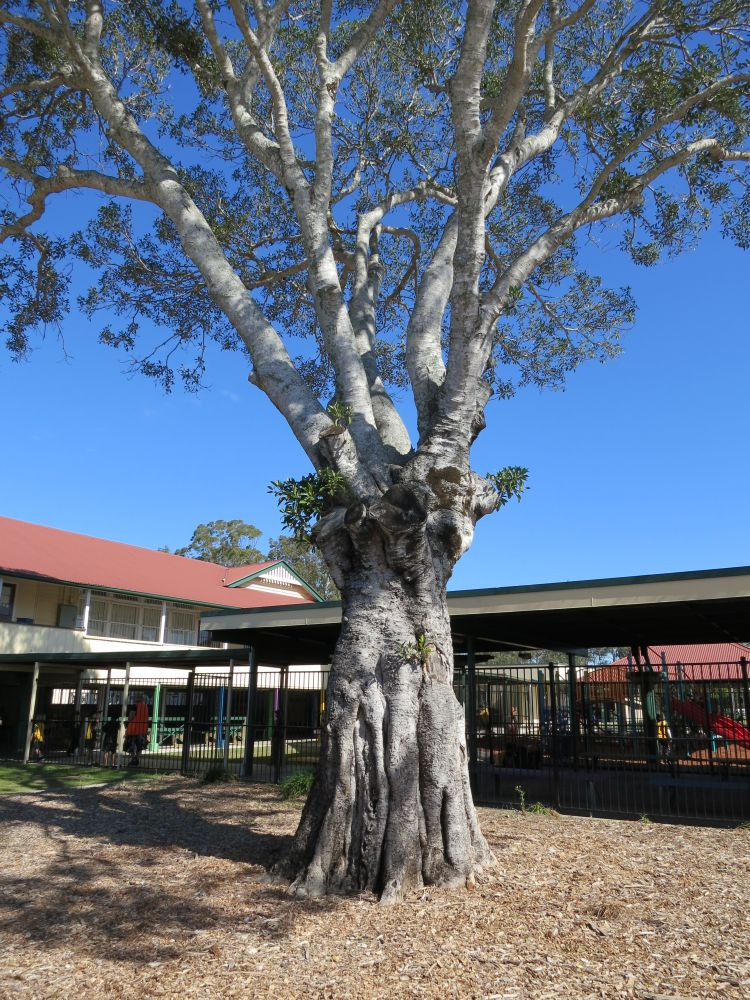
Moreton Bay Fig tree, 2014

An Arbor Day report of Morayfield State School in 1958 stated that an old and very fine narrow leafed fig growing in the stump of a tree was an extraordinarily good specimen and provided shade all the year. A class photograph from 1959 and aerial photographs from 1956 and 1973 show the fig as a mature tree within an almost treeless playground. Some mature trees visible north of the fig in 1956 were removed by 1973. The topsoil of Morayfield State School is very shallow over clay, meaning most trees do not grow well or quickly. Therefore, the age of the fig might be greater than its size suggests.

Alterations to the Suter building occurred over time but were relatively minor. Bag racks as verandah balustrades became a characteristic design element of Queensland schools after World War II and the Suter building had its rear verandah balustrade replaced by bag racks. As a result of further changes in education philosophies and consistent with alterations of other school buildings across the state, in 1955 the Suter building had its fenestration altered again to increase the amount of light into the classroom. This involved replacing the narrow windows in the gable end walls with modern awning style windows.

Between the 1960s and the 1980s Queensland education was reformed and the teaching buildings at Morayfield State School were altered as a result. The Education Act 1964 was a turning point and the first major update of Queensland education's governing legislation since 1875. Effectively, a new era of state education evolved requiring new architectural responses. The Department of Education (as it had been renamed in 1957) continued to give the responsibility of building design to the architects of the Department of Public Works. With new educational philosophies, government policies and functional requirements combined with new architectural styles, materials and technologies, the evolution of standard designs became more fragmented. Rather than "improving" on the previous designs, architects began to design with inspiration drawn from new precedents. Fundamentally, timber construction was no longer favoured and buildings were no longer predominantly highset.

Beginning in the 1970s, Morayfield experienced sharp population growth. Between 1971 and 1976 the population of the Caboolture Shire increased 65.5%, and the number of dwellings increased by 60.5%.

This building boom was repeated at the Morayfield State School. Between 1970 and 1990 new classroom buildings, modular classrooms, toilets, a library, covered areas, a pre-school, an administration block, and a resource centre were constructed. The Suter building received minor alterations in c. 1977 to convert it for use as a staff room; this involved removing the windows in the western verandah wall and enclosing the southern end of the western verandah to form a cleaners' room. By 2014 the Suter building was utilised as a Student Behaviour Room.

In 2014, the school continues to operate from the site and retains the Suter building, the playshed, and the shade tree. The school is important to the town and district having operated since 1873 and having taught generations of Morayfield students. Since establishment it has been a key social focus for the Morayfield community with the grounds and buildings having been the location of many social events over time. The Suter building is also "Site 1" on the local Caboolture River Road Heritage Drive.

== Description ==
Morayfield State School is located to the south of the central business district of Morayfield. The school site is a 16.5-hectare irregular-shaped block on the corner of two main thoroughfares, Morayfield Road on the east and Caboolture River Road on the north. The site accommodates a closely knit complex of buildings, including a Suter-designed teaching building (1873) and a timber playshed (c. 1903). A mature fig tree that stands prominently to the east of the playshed offers shade to the school grounds.

The Suter building is located at the centre of the complex. It is a small, low-set timber structure on concrete stumps, with modern timber lattice screening between the floor level and the ground. The gable roof is clad with corrugated metal sheets. Evidence in the barge boards suggests original timber shingles may survive under the existing roof sheets.

The building has verandahs front (east) and back (west) reached by a small, centrally located set of timber stairs on either side. The verandahs have stop-chamfered timber posts, timber floor boards, and raked ceilings lined with wide, beaded timber boards. The verandah walls are single skin with externally exposed timber framing, diagonal cross bracing between studs, and a door into the interior from both the east and west verandahs. The eastern verandah has a decorative timber balustrade of crossed members, and the western balustrade is bag racks. The western verandah is enclosed at the southern and northern ends to accommodate small store rooms, and some original stop-chamfered timber posts are visible within the enclosing cladding. The southern storeroom walls are clad with modern fibrocement sheeting, and the northern storeroom has internally exposed timber framing. Original timber floor boards, wider than those of the open verandah, survive in the northern store room, while the southern store room has a modern linoleum floor, as well as recent sink and louvre window additions. The eastern verandah has timber framed casement windows either side of the door and a short stair at the northern end of the verandah connects to the adjacent building, Block A.

A plaque that is attached to the eastern verandah wall and adjacent to the front door reads: "Morayfield State School, Opened 4 August 1873". The gable end walls are clad with weatherboards and have banks of modern timber-framed awning windows under horizontal hoods.

The interior of the Suter building classroom is lined with horizontal, beaded timber boards on both the walls and the underside of the roof. A line within the beaded boards on the southern end of the western wall indicates a window now enclosed, and indentations in the boards underneath windows on the eastern wall indicate there were earlier, larger window sills. Moulded timber architraves frame the doors and windows of the eastern and western walls. Timber roof framing, including Queen post trusses with stop-chamfered edges, is exposed within the space. The carpet and linoleum floor linings, the fibrous cement wall cladding, the modern sink at the south of the space and the shelving underneath the northern window are modern additions and are not of cultural heritage significance.

The playshed stands to the north of the Suter building and is a 24-by-16-foot (7.3 m × 4.9 m) structure. The playshed consists of a hipped roof of corrugated metal sheets supported on six timber posts, each of which have splayed bracing to support the top plate. All roof-framing is exposed internally. The modern seats, adjacent aluminium playground fencing, and concrete slab are not of cultural heritage significance.

A large, mature fig tree (Ficus sp.) provides shade to the area east of the playshed. The lower limbs have been pruned, and the stump in which the fig first was planted is visible within the trunk on the northern side of the tree. The fig has landmark attributes within the school, being clearly visible from many areas and above buildings.

No other buildings and structures within the heritage boundary are of cultural heritage significance.

== Heritage listing ==
Morayfield State School was listed on the Queensland Heritage Register on 10 October 2014 having satisfied the following criteria.

The place is important in demonstrating the evolution or pattern of Queensland's history.

Morayfield State School (established in 1873 as Caboolture National School) is important in demonstrating the evolution of state education, and its associated architecture, in Queensland. The place retains excellent, representative examples of standard government designs that were architectural responses to prevailing government educational philosophies. The teaching building (1873), designed by architect Richard Suter, is an early standardised design; and the playshed (1903), demonstrates the education system's recognition of the importance of play in the curriculum.

Reserved for school purposes in 1872, the place demonstrates the establishment and development of settlement in the Caboolture/Morayfield area, an early agricultural and sugar growing centre in Queensland.

The place demonstrates rare, uncommon or endangered aspects of Queensland's cultural heritage.

The Suter building at Morayfield State School is rare as one of three known surviving intact examples of the approximately 65 buildings of this type constructed.

The place is important in demonstrating the principal characteristics of a particular class of cultural places.

Morayfield State School is important in demonstrating the principal characteristics of early Queensland state schools, including standard building designs by the Queensland Government.

The Suter building retains the characteristics of its original design. It is single-skin timber-framed and lowset, with front and rear verandahs and a single classroom that is well ventilated and day-lit. Changing philosophies in state primary education are evident in the modifications made to this building, including enlarged windows and verandah bag racks.

The playshed is open sided, with a hipped timber-framed roof form supported on braced timber posts.

The Fig tree (Ficus sp.) is a fine example of the shade trees planted in Queensland school grounds.

The place has a strong or special association with a particular community or cultural group for social, cultural or spiritual reasons.

Queensland schools have always played an important part in Queensland communities. They typically retain a significant and enduring connection with former pupils, their parents, and teachers; provide a venue for social interaction and volunteer work; and are a source of pride, symbolising local progress and aspirations. Morayfield State School has a strong and ongoing association with the Morayfield community. It was established in 1873 through the fund-raising efforts of the local community and has educated generations of Morayfield children. The place is important for its contribution to the educational development of Morayfield and is a prominent community focal point and gathering place for social events, with widespread community support.

== See also ==
- List of schools in Greater Brisbane
- History of state education in Queensland
