= Burpengary–Caboolture Road =

Road in Queensland, Australia

Burpengary–Caboolture Road (Morayfield Road) Queensland

General information
- Type: Road
- Length: 8.0 km (5.0 mi)
- Route number(s): (Burpengary – Caboolture)

Major junctions
- South-east end: Bruce Highway, Burpengary
- Burpengary Service Road; Graham Road; Oakey Flat Road; Caboolture River Road
- North end: Caboolture Connection Road (King Street), Caboolture

Location(s)
- Major suburbs: Morayfield, Caboolture South

Burpengary–Caboolture Road is a continuous 8.0 kilometres (5.0 mi) road route in the City of Moreton Bay, Queensland, Australia. It is designated as part of State Route 60. It is a state-controlled district road (number 406), rated as a local road of regional significance (LRRS).

Burpengary–Caboolture Road is known locally (with Local and State Government approval) as Morayfield Road.

== Route description ==
Burpengary–Caboolture Road (Morayfield Road) commences as State Route 60 at an intersection with the Bruce Highway in Burpengary. It runs west, passing the Burpengary Service Road to the south-east, and turning north-west before entering Morayfield, where it passes the exit to Graham Road to the north-east. It crosses the North Coast railway line and continues to the north-west until it reaches the exit to Oakey Flat Road to the south-west.

From there the road continues north-west until it reaches the exit to Caboolture River Road to the west, where it turns north and enters Caboolture South. It continues north, crossing the Caboolture River into Caboolture, where it ends at an intersection with Caboolture Connection Road (King Street).

Land use along the road is mainly retail with some rural and some light industrial.

== Road condition ==
The road is fully sealed, and most of it is four lane divided road.

=== Upgrade projects ===
A lead project to improve safety on sections of this road and Beerburrum Road, at a cost of $28.8 million, was under construction in July 2022, with some sub-projects already completed.

- * Between Esme Avenue and McKean Street intersections. (Completed October 2021)
- * Between Acquatic Centre Drive and Graham Road intersections.
- * Between Caboolture River Road and Oaklands Drive intersections. (Completed March 2021)
- * Between Lindsay Road and Oakey Flat Road intersections. (Completed October 2019)

== History ==
Burpengary was first settled by Europeans in the 1870s, and the first industry was mainly timber-cutting.

In 1868 a sugar plantation was established in what is now Morayfield.

The Caboolture area was colonised by European people in 1842 when the land around the Moreton Bay penal colony was opened up to free settlers. By the mid-1860s farms had been established and the local pastoralists were experimenting with sugar cane and cotton.

This road, including a bridge over the Caboolture River, existed as Morayfield Road (also Gympie Road) in 1901. It was part of the Bruce Highway when it was declared in 1934, and remained so until August 1966, when the Caboolture Bypass Stage 1 was completed between Burpengary Creek and Bribie Island Road.

== Future usage ==
Land several kilometres to the west of the road is the site of a new regional city to be known as Caboolture West. It is planned that, over the next 40 years, it will grow to accommodate 30,000 new homes with a population of 70,000. It is expected that this development will result in increased traffic on Morayfield Road, as well as other roads in the area. Southbound traffic will continue to increase until completion of Stage 3 of the Bruce Highway Western Alternative.

Prior to the 2022 Federal election the then Coalition Government promised to commit $100 million to build a new road from the Caboolture River Road intersection to Buchanan Road, with a bridge over the railway line. If built, it is expected that this would take a substantial amount of northbound traffic off Morayfield Road.

== Intersecting state-controlled road ==
The following state-controlled road intersects with Burpengary–Caboolture Road:

- Burpengary Service Road

=== Burpengary Service Road ===
Burpengary Service Road
- Location: Deception Bay Road, Burpengary to Burpengary–Caboolture Road, Burpengary
- Length: 4.8 km (3.0 mi)

Burpengary Service Road is a State-controlled regional road (number 901) rated as a local road of regional significance (LRRS). It runs for 4.8 kilometres (3.0 mi) from Deception Bay Road, Burpengary to Burpengary–Caboolture Road, Burpengary, and is known in parts as Old Gympie Road, Progress Road, and Morayfield Road. It does not intersect with any state-controlled roads.

== Major intersections ==
All distances are from Google Maps. The entire road is within the City of Moreton Bay.

Location	km	mi	Destinations	Notes
Burpengary	0	0.0	Bruce Highway – north – Caboolture – south – Brisbane	Diamond interchange. South-eastern end of Burpengary–Caboolture Road (Morayfield Road) (State Route 60); Road continues east as Uhlmann Road.
Burpengary	0.65	0.40	Burpengary Service Road – south–east – Burpengary	Roundabout interchange. Road continues north-west.
Morayfield	2.9	1.8	Graham Road – north–east – Bruce Highway (via Buchanan Road)	Road continues north-west.
Morayfield	4.7	2.9	Oakey Flat Road – south–west – Narangba	Road continues north-west. Northbound entry and exit only.
Morayfield	5.4	3.4	Caboolture River Road – west – Upper Caboolture	Road continues north.
Caboolture	8.0	5.0	Caboolture Connection Road – west – Moodlu – east – Bruce Highway	Northern end of Burpengary–Caboolture Road. Road continues north as Beerburrum Road
1.000 mi = 1.609 km; 1.000 km = 0.621 mi

== See also ==
- List of road routes in Queensland
- List of numbered roads in Queensland
