= Deception Bay =

Deception Bay may refer to:

- Deception Bay, Queensland, a suburb of Brisbane, Australia
  - Deception Bay (Queensland), the body of water for which it is named
- Deception Bay, Quebec, a former trading post of the Hudson's Bay Company
- Deception Bay, a 2018 album by Milk & Bone
- British fur trader John Meares named the mouth of the Columbia River, Washington state, US, as Cape Disappointment and Deception Bay
