= Burpengary railway station =

Railway station in Queensland, Australia

Burpengary
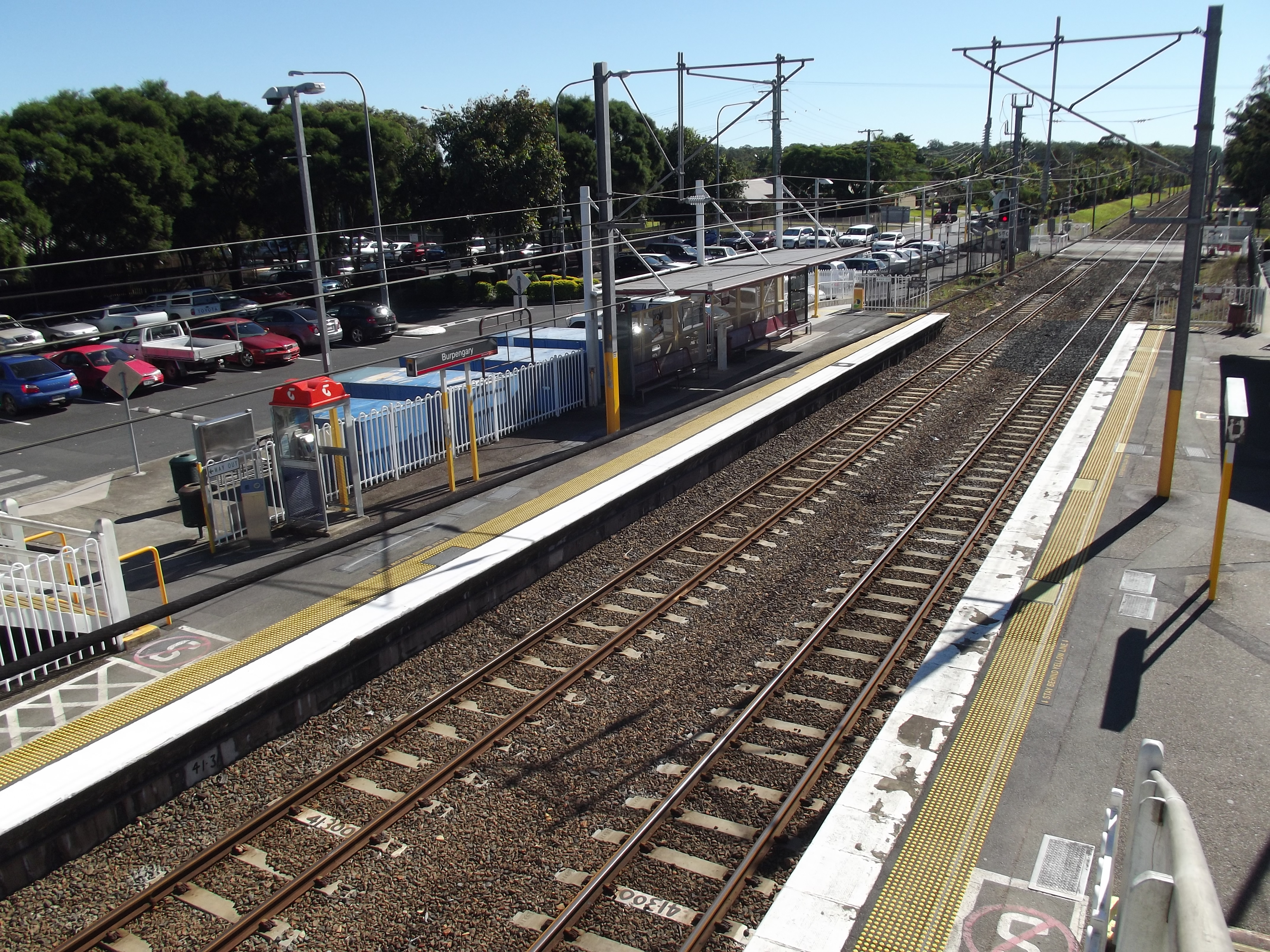
- Northbound view of the station platforms in July 2012

General information
- Location: Burpengary Road, Burpengary
- Coordinates: 27°9′44″S 152°57′25″E
- Owner: Queensland Rail
- Operator: Queensland Rail
- Lines: T1 Caboolture; T1 Nambour/Gympie North
- Platforms: 2 side
- Tracks: 2

Construction
- Structure type: Ground
- Parking: 417 bays
- Cycle facilities: Yes
- Accessible: Yes

Other information
- Status: Staffed
- Station code: 600472 (platform 1); 600473 (platform 2); 310047 (bus stop)
- Fare zone: Zone 3
- Website: Queensland Rail

History
- Opened: June 1888; 138 years ago
- Rebuilt: 9 September 2024

Services
Preceding station	Queensland Rail	Following station
Narangba towards Ipswich or Rosewood via Roma Street	T1 Caboolture line	Morayfield towards Caboolture
Narangba towards Ipswich or Rosewood via Roma Street	T1 Nambour/Gympie North line	Morayfield towards Nambour
Location

Burpengary is a railway station operated by Queensland Rail on the Caboolture and Nambour/Gympie North lines. It opened in 1888 and serves the Moreton Bay suburb of Burpengary. It is a ground level station, featuring two side platforms.

== History ==
From 22 January 2024 until 9 September 2024, Burpengary station was closed for an accessibility upgrade. This upgrade includes additions of lifts, raised platforms, hearing loops and disability compliant ticket windows.

== Services ==
Burpengary station is served by all Citytrain network services from Nambour and Caboolture to Central, many continuing to Springfield Central, Ipswich and Rosewood.

== Platforms and services ==
Burpengary platform arrangement
Platform	Lines	Destinations	Notes
1	T1 Caboolture	Roma Street (to Ipswich/Rosewood line)	
1	T1 Nambour/Gympie North	Roma Street (to Ipswich/Rosewood line)	
2	T1 Caboolture	Caboolture	
2	T1 Nambour/Gympie North	Nambour	

== Transport links ==
Kangaroo Bus Lines operates one bus route to and from Burpengary station:

- 664: Burpengary loop service
