= Oaklands Sugar Mill =

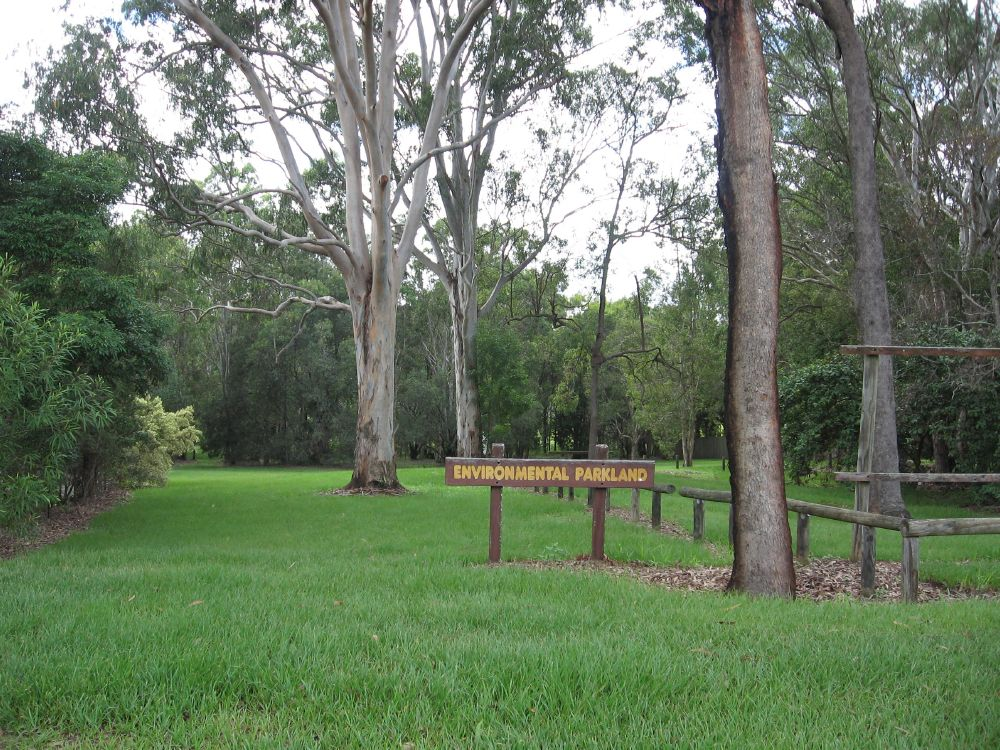
- Oaklands looking east from Captain Whish Ave along northern boundary, 2010

- Location within Queensland Location within Australia
- 27.0963°S 152.9744°E
- Location: 68 Captain Whish Avenue, Morayfield, City of Moreton Bay, Queensland, Australia

History
- Design period: 1840s–1860s (mid-19th century)
- Built: 1865

Queensland Heritage Register
- Official name: Oaklands Sugar Mill Remnants, Whish's Sugar Mill Remnants
- Type: archaeological
- Designated: 18 September 2009
- Reference no.: 645607
- Significant period: 1865–1872 (sugar mill); 1873–1990 (agriculture and grazing)
- Significant components: building foundations/ruins

Oaklands Sugar Mill is a heritage-listed remains of a former sugar cane mill at 68 Captain Whish Avenue, Morayfield, City of Moreton Bay, Queensland, Australia. It was built in 1865. It is also known as Whish's Sugar Mill Remnants. It was added to the Queensland Heritage Register on 18 September 2009.

== History ==
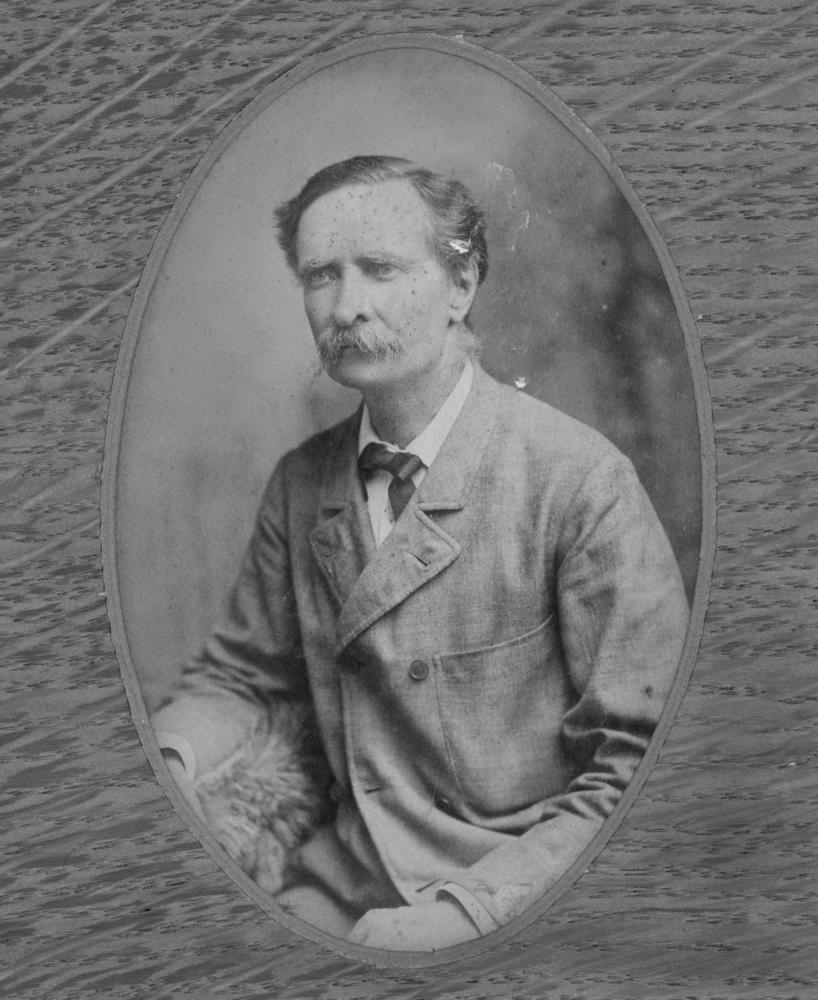
Claudius Buchanan Whish

The Oaklands sugar mill operated between 1865 and 1872. The mill was built and operated by Claudius Buchanan Whish, the first sugar producer to market his produce in Queensland in commercial quantities. The mill was used to process the cane harvested from fields on his Oaklands property – much of the harvesting was performed by South Sea Islander labourers. The mill ceased production in 1872 as sugar yields were poor in the mild winter climate of southern Queensland and due to the competition of larger and better yielding plantations being established in the Maryborough and Mackay regions.

By 1836, sugar cane had reached southern Queensland and was being grown in small plots in the Moreton Bay Penal Settlement. Experimentation with sugar cane as a viable crop was also conducted between 1836 and 1847 by a number of enterprising citizens of the colony. Trials of suitable varieties were undertaken by John Buhot in the Brisbane's botanic gardens; BHS 1995:5; Blake 2003:36).

Sugar cultivation was pioneered in Queensland by Louis Hope who established a plantation at his Ormiston House Estate in 1862. Hope erected Queensland's first sugar crushing mill, supplied by Cook & Co. of Glasgow, on his Ormiston property on the banks of Hilliard's Creek in 1864. The first commercially milled sugar in Queensland was produced there in September that year.

Caboolture was one of the first districts in Queensland where sugar was grown on a substantial scale. George Raff, a prominent Brisbane merchant and politician, began planting sugar at his Morayfield on the Caboolture River in 1864.

One of the first to respond to the successes of Hope and Raff in growing sugar was Captain Claudius Buchanan Whish. Whish had served as an officer in the British army in India before deciding to begin a new career in Australia. After seeing Hope's and Raff's plantations in operation, Whish selected land on the southern banks of the Caboolture River. Whish named his property Oaklands and employed Buhot to provide advice on the planting of his estate.

In 1865, Whish took on John Raymond Trevilian as a business partner for his Oaklands operations. Whish required a large labour force to cultivate the cane in sufficient quantities to make the operation marketable and profitable. After consulting with his contemporaries in the sugar industry, Raff and Hope, Trevilian undertook a voyage to Melanesia to find suitable labourers. In December 1865, 33 South Sea Islander labourers were brought to Australia and arrived at Oaklands by bullock dray after disembarking on the North Pine River. Whish is reported to have paid up to £7 for each labourer. They were housed in the cotton house and fed milk and rice. Whish was therefore not only a pioneer in the sugar industry but also in the use of South Sea Islander labour only two years after the first group of Islanders had been brought to Australia by Robert Towns for his cotton plantation on the Logan River.

The introduction of Islander labour on Oaklands was an initial success. With a large amount of sugar being cultivated, Whish acquired capital to build a sugar mill on Oaklands in 1865. In 1866, he purchased a six-horsepower mill from Smellie & Co of Brisbane for his new mill and installed a Wetzel pan and centrifuge. A "single-flued boiler, mill, with three rollers" and a battery "set in brickworks, with plain brick top and skimmings channel therein", and a boiling-room and curing room were also on site. The sugar processing operations are also noted as being located in the "middle of the plantation, and at the top side of the present cultivation". Whish also obtained a distiller's licence for £25 so that he could produce rum from molasses.

The success of the sugar operations at Oaklands and the use of Islander labour is further highlighted by Whish's replacement in 1867 of the original 33 Islander labourers with another 50 for whom he paid £150 in advance. That same year, his homestead included a large house, manager's residence, labourer's cottages and huts. There was also a large store, blacksmith's shop, stables and carriage house, all arranged in "...a rather irregular manner".

By 1869 Whish had approximately 90 acres (36 ha) of cane under cultivation on Oaklands and another 26 acres (11 ha) on the shores of Moreton Bay. Further evidence of Whish's belief in his Islander labour force was his construction of a building to properly house them in 1871.

The early success on Oaklands however did not last. The climate was marginally too mild for the sugar plants to grow in the winter months. Moreover, the development of plantations further north around Maryborough and Mackay produced better yields and featured a shorter period of growth. As early as 1870, case rum and liqueurs made at Whish's distillery were being offered for sale at reduced prices. In an attempt to continue sugar operations at Oaklands, the idea of a limited liability company was considered. The capital proposed was £12,000 in shares of £10 each. However, by 1872, Oaklands ceased sugar production. In February 1872, much of the equipment and working plant from Oaklands was offered for sale. Much of the equipment was purchased by the Mackenzie brothers of Ingham and moved to their operations in the Herbert River district of north Queensland. The site of Oaklands was sold at auction in September 1873 and subsequently used for grazing and agriculture following the closure of the sugar mill until gazetted as an environmental reserve in 1990.

== Description ==
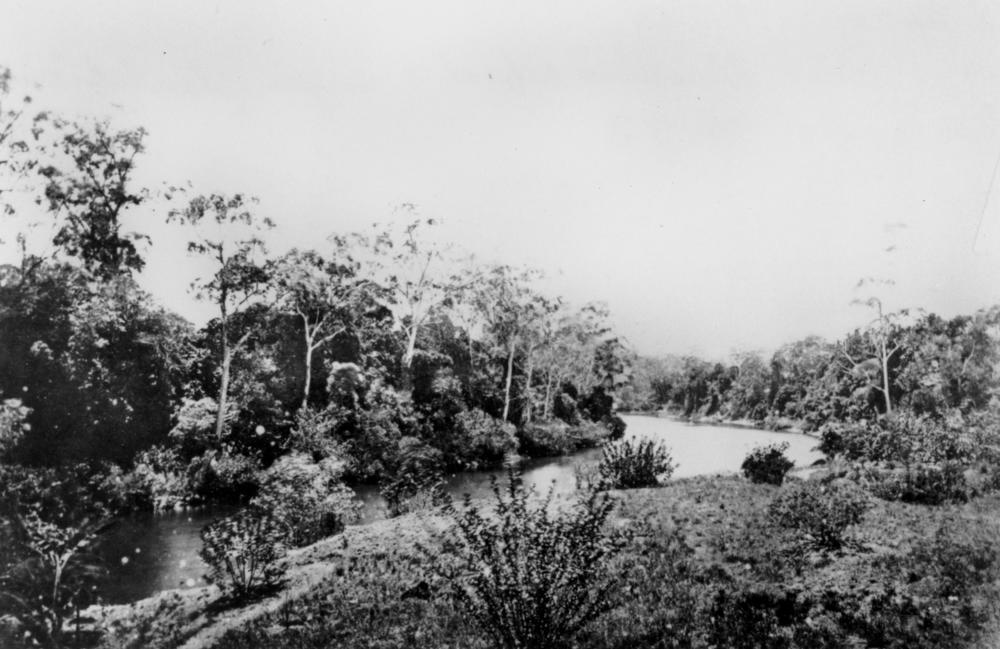
Along the Caboolture River near the Whish sugar plantation, Oaklands, 1873

The archaeological features within Lot 600 on RP804608 are most likely associated with the former Oaklands Sugar Mill operations. They are located east of Captain Whish Avenue in a small park owned by the Moreton Bay City Council. This constitutes Lot 600 on RP804608 which has been verified as being part of the original property that Claudius Whish acquired as a co-tenant with John Raymond Trevilian in September 1865 and subsequently named "Oaklands". This is verifiable in the historical title for this parcel of land.

Ground surface visibility on the property is good. The site has a low fence of treated pine logs delineating the site. It is suspected that archaeological deposits may particularly extend further east of this fencing.

Substantial archaeological artefacts and features are evident on site, including in-situ bricks that may be the foundations for a substantial structure or foundations for milling and crushing machinery. Four substantial depressions can be identified, with significant brick remnants adjacent to each in low mound formations. The depressions are suggestive of rooms, compartments or in-ground tanks within a larger remnant subsurface structure. Visible bricks appear to be hand-made, with a narrow rectangular frog on one face. Exotic guava trees are also growing throughout the place.

The western extent of the place is considered the edge of the road reserve abutting Lot 600 on RP804608. The eastern extent of the remnants is unclear, but potentially extends beyond the limits of the pine log fencing. The site is abutted by modern houses to the north and south and additional elements of the sugar mill may have at one time been located in those areas. However any remnants located to the north and south are likely to have undergone disturbance due to the levelling of the lot and subsequent construction work. Based on the available evidence and low potential for these areas, the boundary for the sugar mill is considered as the northern and southern extents of Lot 600 on RP804608.

== Heritage listing ==
The remnants of the Oaklands Sugar Mill were listed on the Queensland Heritage Register on 18 September 2009 having satisfied the following criteria.

The remnants of the Oaklands Sugar Mill are physical evidence of the early agricultural history of the Caboolture region, and are representative of one of the earliest developments in Queensland's influential sugar industry. These remnants are evidence of one of the earliest endeavours to produce sugar on a commercial basis in Queensland.

The remnants demonstrate attempts to develop primary industries in the Caboolture and north coast region. Though production was short-lived (1865—1872), the early successes at Oaklands influenced the expansion of the sugar industry into other centres of Queensland.

The remnants are associated with an important identity in the early development of the sugar industry in Queensland, Captain Claudius Buchanan Whish. Whish was one of the first sugar producers in Queensland to market commercial quantities of sugar and high quality rum. He was also to later become a member of the Queensland Legislative Assembly from 1870 to 1872 and Surveyor of Roads.

The remnants are a rare and early surviving reminder of the use of South Sea Islander labour in southeast Queensland. South Sea Islander labourer was employed on Oaklands from 1865 only two years after Robert Towns first introduced their labour on his properties in Queensland. The Oaklands site dates from the early phase of South Sea Islander employment in the sugar industry and could provide important evidence about early practices and, in comparison with other sites, if and how those practices may have changed over time.

Oaklands has considerable potential to reveal information regarding the development of sugar production processes. The early era of sugar plantations was marked by the idiosyncratic introduction of new processes and techniques. Although initially successful, the venture at Oaklands was ultimately a failure and comparison of this site with other more successful sites may reveal important information about how producers attempted to adapt to varying environments, and ultimately, about how sugar production techniques in Queensland changed and evolved.

The place has high potential for additional archaeological artefacts. Though subdivision has occurred in the vicinity of the mill remnants, there is no evidence to suggest that Lot 600 on RP804608 has undergone any significant ground disturbance since the closure and dismantling of the mill. A number of in-situ bricks, mound features and depressions on the property are suggestive of substantial structural foundations concealed in shallow to medium depth deposits just below the current land surface.

Little documentary evidence is available that relates to the sugar processing operations on Whish's Oaklands property, other than reports on levels of production and sale. Analysis of available documentary sources combined with further archaeological investigations of the remnants has potential to answer important research questions relating to early sugar processing techniques and technologies and the working conditions experienced by South Sea Islander labourers working on Queensland sugar plantations. Archaeological investigations of the remnants may also reveal new and important information about the Oaklands Mill layout and may provide evidence on the location of other mill and plantation infrastructure not discernible from documentary sources alone.

== See also ==
- List of sugar mills in Queensland
