= Burpengary =

- Town
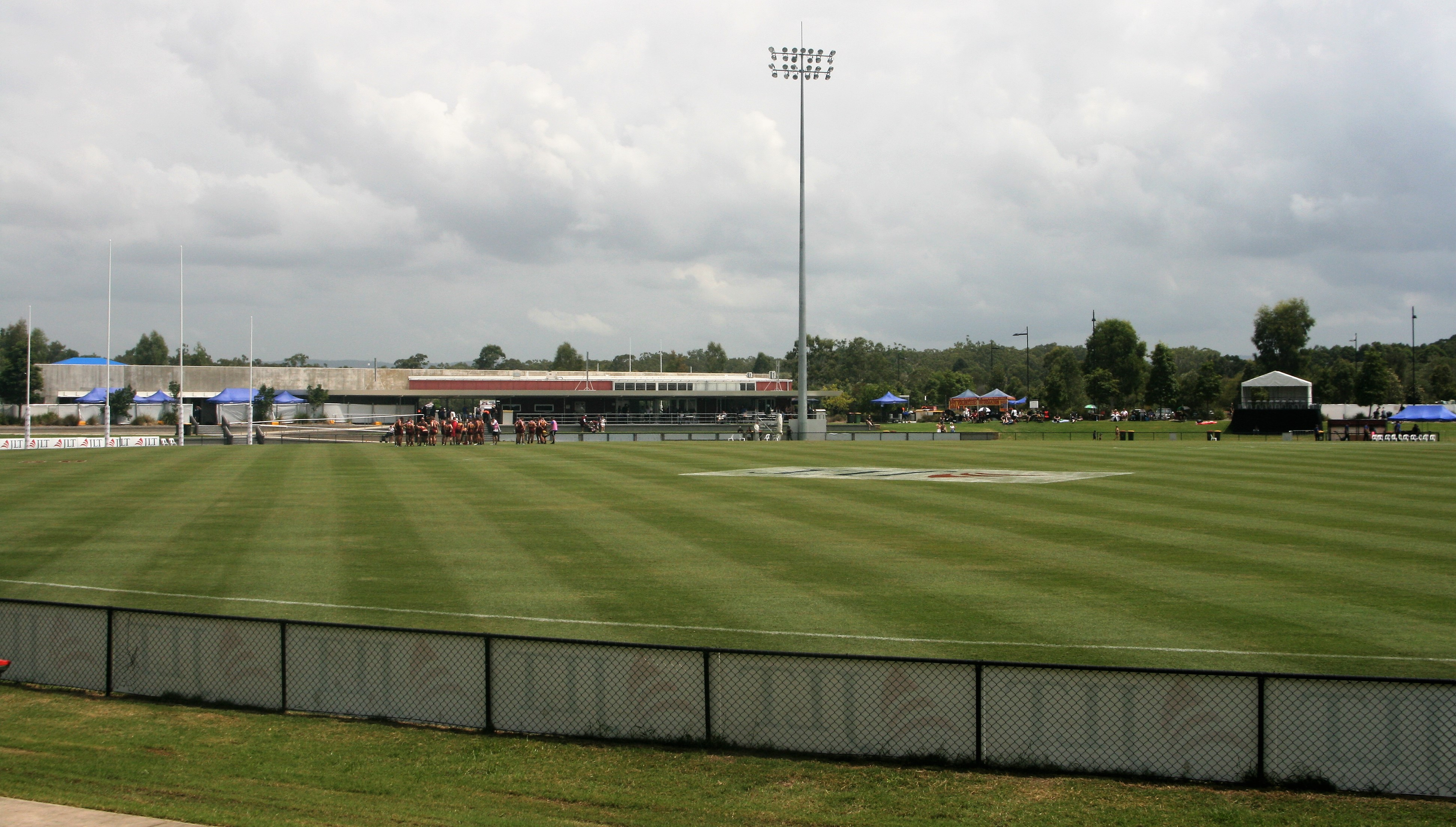
- Moreton Bay Central Sports Complex, 2018

- Interactive map of Burpengary
- Coordinates: 27.1545°S 152.9730°E
- Country: Australia
- State: Queensland
- LGA: City of Moreton Bay
- Location: 9.0 km (5.6 mi) S of Caboolture; 17.4 km (10.8 mi) N of Strathpine; 19.1 km (11.9 mi) NW of Redcliffe; 38.9 km (24.2 mi) N of Brisbane CBD

Government
  - State electorates: Kurwongbah; Morayfield
  - Federal division: Longman

Area
  - Total: 22.5 km^{2} (8.7 sq mi)

Population
  - Total: 16,488 (2021 census)
  - Density: 732.8/km^{2} (1,898/sq mi)
- Time zone: UTC+10:00 (AEST)
- Postcode: 4505
Localities around Burpengary
Morayfield	Morayfield	Burpengary East
Morayfield	Burpengary	Burpengary East
Narangba	Narangba	Deception Bay

Burpengary is a town and suburb in the City of Moreton Bay, Queensland, Australia. In the 2021 census, the suburb of Burpengary had a population of 16,488 people.

It is 38.9 kilometres (24.2 mi) by road from the Brisbane central business district.

== Geography ==
The locality is bounded to the east by the Bruce Highway, to the west by Oakey Flat Road, to the north-west by the North Coast railway line, and to the south-west by Burpengary Creek and the North Coast railway line.

Burpengary railway station serves the town (27.1621°S 152.9573°E).

Burpengary Creek is the suburb's main waterway.

Burpengary–Caboolture Road (Morayfield Road) runs through the locality from north-east to north.

== History ==
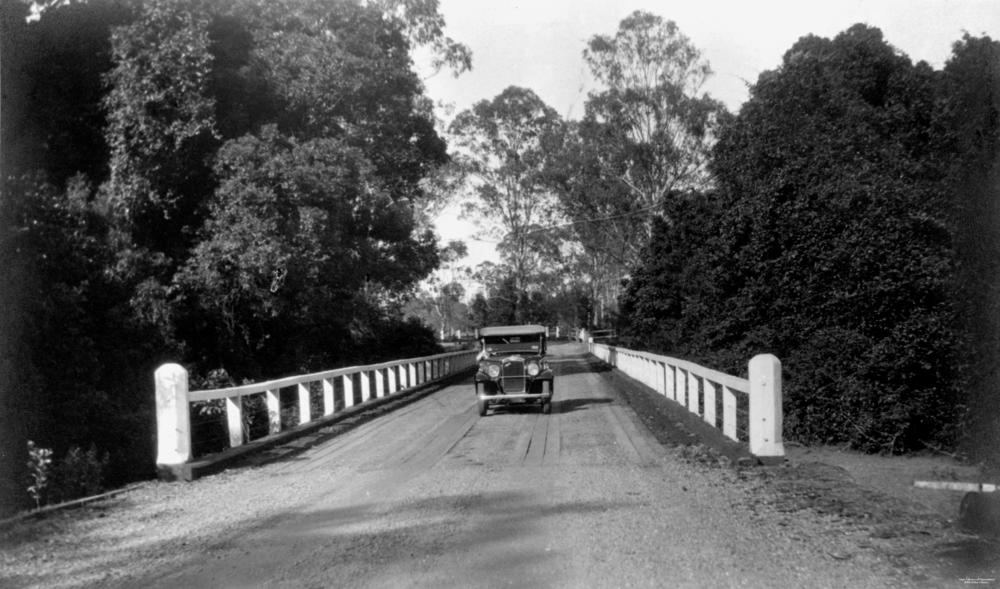
Austin motor vehicle crossing a bridge at Burpengary, 1934

The name is derived from the Aboriginal word burpengar, meaning the "place of the green wattle".

When Europeans settled in Burpengary in the 1870s, the industry was mainly timber-cutting.

Burpengary Provisional School opened on 9 November 1876. On 1 January 1909 it became Burpengary State School. It closed and re-opened a number of times as student numbers fluctuated.

The town of Burpengary was initially founded as a large truckstop due to its strategic location on the North Coast Road (now the Bruce Highway) from Brisbane to the North Coast (now the Sunshine Coast). Burpengary is still home to a functional truck weigh-bridge.

St Eugene College (Burpengary's first secondary school) opened on 1 December 1989.

Burpengary Library opened in 1994 and had a major refurbishment in 2016.

Historically, Burpengary has been a predominantly blue-collar suburb with a significant proportion of the population directly employed in a labouring or trade-related jobs. However, with expanding planned communities, access to the M1 and council approving plans for mini city initiatives, more and more families are moving to the locality including those in the professions. This is fuelling economic growth with the expansion of the shopping precinct, local services and increasing pressure on the local transport infrastructure since 2005.

Burpengary Meadows State School opened in 2007.

In 2013, Burpengary was one of the Moreton Bay Region's fastest growing residential areas.

Burpengary State Secondary College opened in 2015, offering years 7 and 8 initially.

Redwood College was opened by an evangelical Christian group in 2018 to provide a Christian-based distance education only, with expectations of enrolling on-campus students once buildings were completed. The school closed in December 2023, following complaints of underpayment of teachers and concerns over its education program. It was a primary and secondary (Prep-10) school at 6 Gleeson Road (27.1379°S 152.9661°E).

== Demographics ==
In the 2016 census, the suburb of Burpengary had a population of 14,022 people, with 51% females and 49% males. The median age of the Burpengary population was 37 years of age, 1 year below the Australian median. Children aged under 15 years made up 20.7% of the population and people aged 65 years and over made up 13.6% of the population. 78.6% of people living in Burpengary were born in Australia. The other top responses for country of birth were England 4.7%, New Zealand 4.2%, South Africa 0.7%, Philippines 0.7%, and Scotland 0.6%. 90.7% of people spoke only English at home; the next most popular languages were Samoan (0.4%), Mandarin (0.3%), Tagalog (0.3%), Dutch (0.3%), and Afrikaans (0.2%).

In the 2021 census, the suburb of Burpengary had a population of 16,488 people.

== Education ==
Burpengary State School is a government primary (Prep-6) school for boys and girls at 35 Station Road (27.1577°S 152.9590°E). In 2017, the school had an enrolment of 995 students with 69 teachers (63 full-time equivalent) and 36 non-teaching staff (24 full-time equivalent). In 2018, the school had an enrolment of 954 students with 71 teachers (65 full-time equivalent) and 40 non-teaching staff (24 full-time equivalent). The school includes an intensive English language program and a special education program.

Burpengary Meadows State School is a government primary (Prep-6) school for boys and girls at 153 Rowley Road (27.1598°S 152.9382°E). In 2017, the school had an enrolment of 625 students with 47 teachers (37 full-time equivalent) and 28 non-teaching staff (17 full-time equivalent). In 2018, the school had an enrolment of 635 students with 42 teachers (37 full-time equivalent) and 29 non-teaching staff (18 full-time equivalent). The school includes a special education program.

St Eugene College is a Catholic primary and secondary (Prep-12) school for boys and girls at 138 Station Road (27.1525°S 152.9689°E). In 2017, the school had an enrolment of 1,053 students with 78 teachers (74 full-time equivalent) and 51 non-teaching staff (35 full-time equivalent). In 2018, the school had an enrolment of 1,037 students with 75 teachers (71 full-time equivalent) and 49 non-teaching staff (35 full-time equivalent).

Burpengary State Secondary College is a government secondary (7-12) school for boys and girls at 196 Pitt Road (27.1706°S 152.9773°E). In 2017, the school had an enrolment of 685 students with 54 teachers (53 full-time equivalent) and 25 non-teaching staff (17 full-time equivalent). In 2018, the school had an enrolment of 886 students with 73 teachers and 29 non-teaching staff (20 full-time equivalent). The school includes a special education program.

== Facilities ==
Burpengary Police Station is at 3 Joyce Street (27.1553°S 152.9710°E).

Burpengary Fire Station is at 185 Pitt Road (27.1697°S 152.9769°E).

Moreton Bay Crematorium & Memorial Park is at 644 Morayfield Road (27.1399°S 152.9702°E).

== Amenities ==
The Moreton Bay City Council operates a public library at 121 Station Road (27.1552°S 152.9673°E).

Burpengary Community Centre is at 101 Station Road (27.1553°S 152.9661°E). It is operated by the Moreton Bay City Council.

St Eugene de Mazenod Catholic Church is at 91 Springfield Drive (27.1506°S 152.9692°E).

Caboolture Regional Environmental Education Centre is in Burpengary (27.1625°S 152.9383°E).

Burpengary Plaza is a shopping centre (27.1553°S 152.9749°E).

Burpengary Equestrian Centre is a sports centre (27.1651°S 152.9522°E).

Caboolture Regional Aquatic Leisure Centre is at 1 Aquatic Centre Drive (27.1296°S 152.9715°E). It has a 50m Olympic pool, a 25m warm up pool, aqua aerobics, tennis, beach volleyball, gymnasium, cafe, barbecues and landscaped settings and enclosed children's play areas.

A new centre in the area is the AFL fields, where the Brisbane Lions played three Australian Football League pre-season competition matches.

There are a number of parks in the suburb, including:

- Bunchanan Park (27.1498°S 152.9755°E)
- Burpengary Sports Complex at 54 Findlay Street (27.1589°S 152.9663°E)
- Cr Ernie Svenson Park (27.1488°S 152.9671°E)
- Grogans Park (27.1240°S 152.9691°E)
- Narangba Sporting Complex (27.1650°S 152.9523°E)

== Transport ==
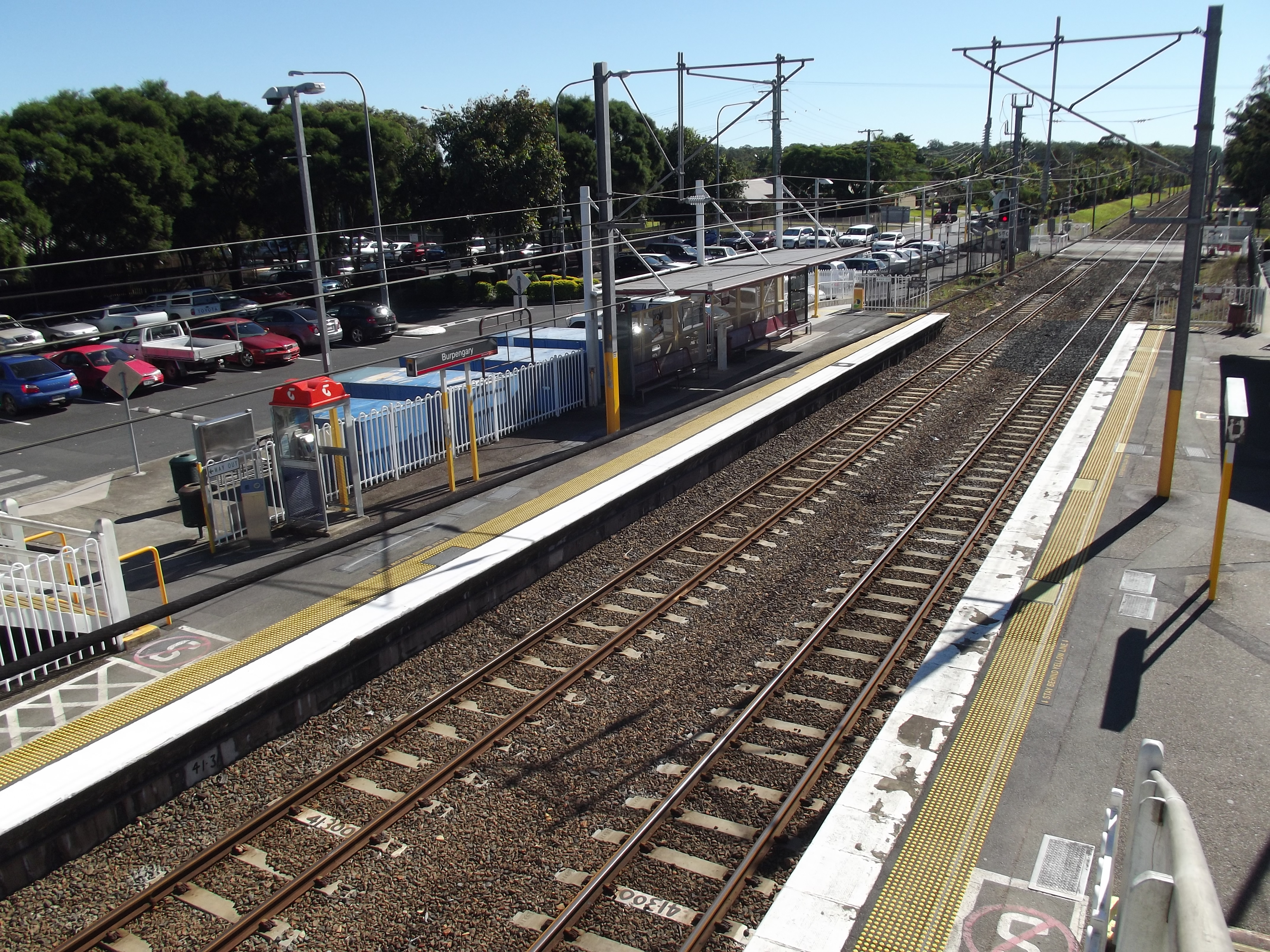
Burpengary railway station, 2012

Burpengary railway station provides access to regular Queensland Rail City network services to Brisbane and Ipswich, as well as Caboolture and the Sunshine Coast.

All bus services in Burpengary traveling ether via or to/from the Burpengary Plaza bus stop located at the rear of Burpengary Plaza (27.1561°S 152.9744°E).

The 664 local loop bus service provides transport throughout the suburb connecting it to train services at Burpengary railway station. The 667 service also runs to Burpengary on Sunday only from Morayfield. The 660 bus also travels through Burpengary providing connections to Redcliffe, Caboolture, Morayfield and Deception Bay.

== Notable residents ==
- Loretta Marron, health advocate and CEO of Friends of Science in Medicine

== See also ==
- Redcliffe Peninsula road network
