= Burpengary Creek =

Tidal creek in Queensland, Australia

Burpengary Creek is a tidal creek in the City of Moreton Bay, Queensland, Australia. It has a total catchment area of 7,960 hectares. It is about 40 kilometres north of Brisbane,

The Burpengary Creek catchment forms part of the larger Deception Bay catchment and encompasses two distinctive creeks–Little Burpengary Creek (6,360ha) and Burpengary Creek (6, 360ha). These creeks flow into Deception Bay just south of the mouth of Caboolture River, which is itself south of Bribie Island.

Burpengary Creek begins in the D’Aguilar Ranges at a height of 340 metres above sea-level. The Creek continues to flow down the mountain slopes into Narangba, through the pine forests adjoining Oakey Flat Road. It then flows into the residential areas of Morayfield and Burpengary before spilling out into southern Deception Bay.

== History ==
Burpengary (meaning place of the wattle trees) holds deep significance for the Aboriginal communities that lived along the creek area. They found it valuable for camping, fishing, making canoes from the trees and for access to the coastline. The last male of the local tribe, Menvil Wanmurarn (also known as Jacky Delaney), was buried alongside the Creek when he died in 1900. He was known as the King of Stoney Creek (the name of Upper Burpengary Creek). His gravesite (approx 27.175632°S 152.921342°E) is listed on the Moreton Bay Region Local Heritage Register.

In 1842 Robert Dixon developed the first map of the area and marked Burpengary Creek on it as Cuthbertson Creek. By 1851 the area around Burpengary Creek was well settled and used for grazing cattle and growing sugar cane and bananas. The dairy industry had a quick demise and farmers were selling their land to Australian Paper Manufacturing (APM) Forests for the plantation of Pine Trees within the catchment. Within a short space of time, around 1958, APM eventually planted over 20,000 hectares of pine forests. Exotic conifers accounted for almost one-third of these forests. APM made a proposal to the Queensland State Government to build a large pulp mill nearby, but these were rejected and APM abandoned the land and sold it to a South Australian property developer. However, this land was marked by the former Caboolture Shire's draft strategic plan to remain for basic rural activities and the development of urban and rural residential properties would not be permitted.

This strategic plan did not withstand the widespread population growth within the Burpengary catchment area as it is now primarily used for suburban development. Continuously more bush land and plantations are being cleared for this progressive development. What this means for residential flora and fauna remains to be seen.

== Fauna and flora ==
It is estimated that less than 7.5% of the original vegetation within Burpengary Creek catchment remains Along the Creek there are many important tree associations that need to be conserved as only remnants of them remain. Along the coast two types of forests are evident–mangroves along the shores of Deception Bay and the tea trees and paperbark forests in the freshwater wetlands. The bulk of the catchment area includes open eucalypt forests, with vine forests / shrubs and riverline forests running sparsely along the edge of the Creek. The largest undisturbed tea tree and scribbly gum forest in south-east Queensland is located in Freshwater National Park, alongside Deception Bay Road. Other tree species found within this region are Smooth Barked Gums, Stringy Barks, Iron Barks, Brush Box, Hoop Pine, Cedar, Ash and Tulip Oak. Extreme care needs to be taken to preserve this vegetation to ensure that it is a safe haven for the numerous species of wildlife that lives within the Burpengary Creek catchment.

Burpengary Creek catchment is home to diverse range of native animals, despite the widespread clearing of native plants and trees to make way for suburban development. There are over 150 bird species, which have been observed along Burpengary Creek. Some of the more common birds that have been sighted include the eastern whipbird, noisy friarbird, galah sulphur-crested cockatoo, tawny frogmouth, laughing kookaburra, kingfishers, honeyeaters, Australian king parrot and Australian magpie.

Burpengary Creek catchment is also home to one of Australians endangered frog species the giant barred frog. This frog lives in the moist forests borrowing beneath fallen leaves and loose soil during the day and comes out at night to forage for food. Alongside this endangered Australian animal there are also other frog species, including the ornate burrowing frog, the rocket frog and the whistling tree frog.

The brown tree snake, green tree snake, carpet python, Australian coral snake and rough-scaled snake also live within this catchment area and are generally seen between the months of October to January. Other reptiles that can be found within this region are Burton's legless lizard, eastern water dragon, bearded dragon and the lace monitor.

Native mammals within this area include: northern brown bandicoot, red-necked wallaby, platypus, ringtail possums, brush tail possums and the grey-headed flying-fox. Furthermore, native bees can also be found within the Burpengary Creek catchment.

== Environmental threats ==
People, plants and animals are the three main threats to Burpengary Creek. Along with widespread settlement along Burpengary Creek came clearing of native plants, pipes built underground, soil erosion, hardening of creek beds and homes built in the flood path, which in turn results in continuing of private and public costs. Early settlement days saw the introduction of horses, cattle and domestic pets, which has seen widespread degradation of natural vegetation which suppresses re-growth and fauna being killed. Introduced species of plants, such as camphor laurel, privet bush, Chinese elm and balloon vine have overrun and in some instances destroyed native vegetation.

Burpengary Creek has risen more than 2 cm over the past 20 years and this trend is expected to rise dramatically.

== Recreational activities ==
Burpengary creek is a good fishing spot and it has nearby boat ramps that allow for easy access to the Creek. There are boat ramps at O’Leary Avenue in Burpengary and at Uhlmann Road boat ramp into Caboolture River with only a short trip around the bend into Burpengary Creek. It is also noted for having large quantities of mud crabs in the lower reaches of the Creek.

Grassy areas within the parks along the Creek line allow for family picnics, flying kites, and general outdoor activities such as Boules or a family game of cricket. Another option is bird-watching at the Caboolture Regional Environmental Education Centre (CREEC) on Rowley Road, Burpengary.

== See also ==
- List of rivers of Australia

== Bibliography ==
- Pulsford, Jim; Lee, E.; Loose, P.; Loose, J. (1991), Burpengary Creek, Wildlife Preservation Society of Caboolture Shire Inc
