= Morayfield Plantation =

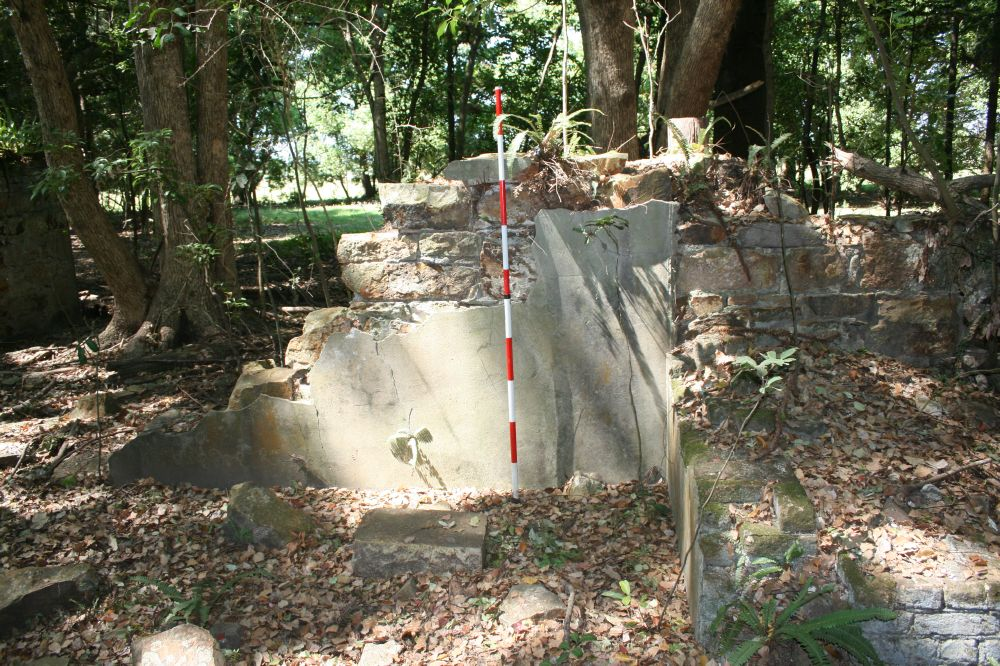
- Main house foundation remnants, 2009

- Location within Queensland Location within Australia
- 27.1055°S 153.0015°E
- Location: 34 Nolan Drive, Morayfield, City of Moreton Bay, Queensland, Australia

History
- Design period: 1840s–1860s (mid-19th century)
- Built: c. 1860s

Queensland Heritage Register
- Official name: Morayfield Plantation
- Type: archaeological
- Designated: 13 May 2011
- Reference no.: 645614
- Significant period: 1865–1886
- Significant components: building foundations/ruins, well, fence/wall – perimeter, artefact field, brick scatter/deposit, grave marker

Morayfield Plantation is a heritage-listed ruins of a sugarcane plantation at 34 Nolan Drive, Morayfield, City of Moreton Bay, Queensland, Australia. It was built in circa 1860s. It was added to the Queensland Heritage Register on 13 May 2011.

== History ==
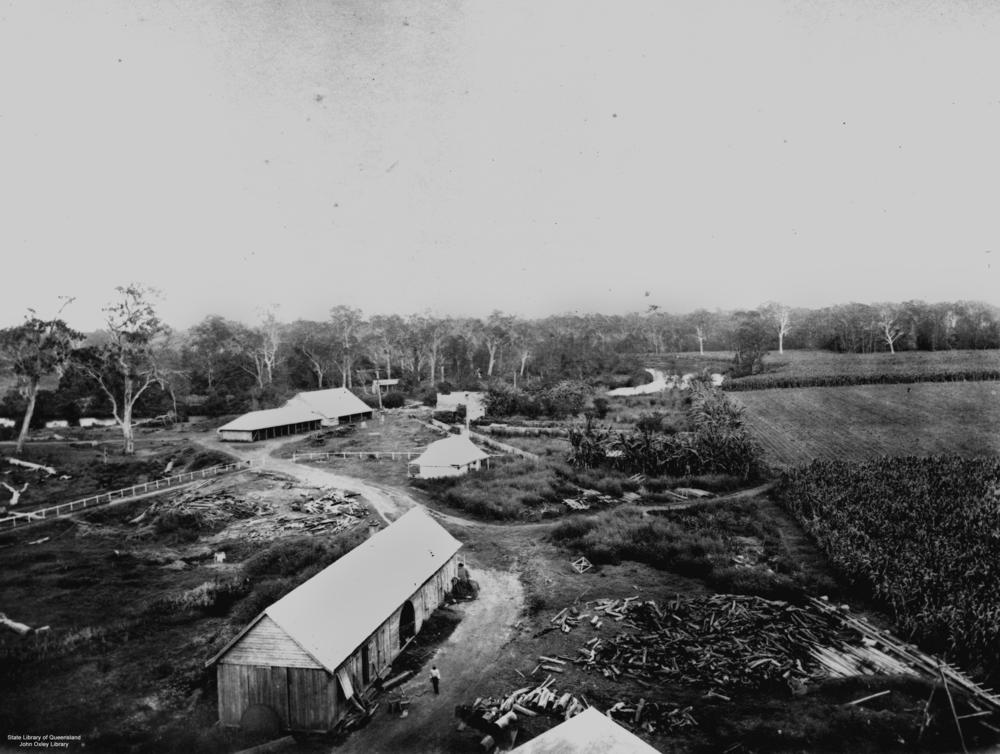
Morayfield Sugar Plantation, 1873

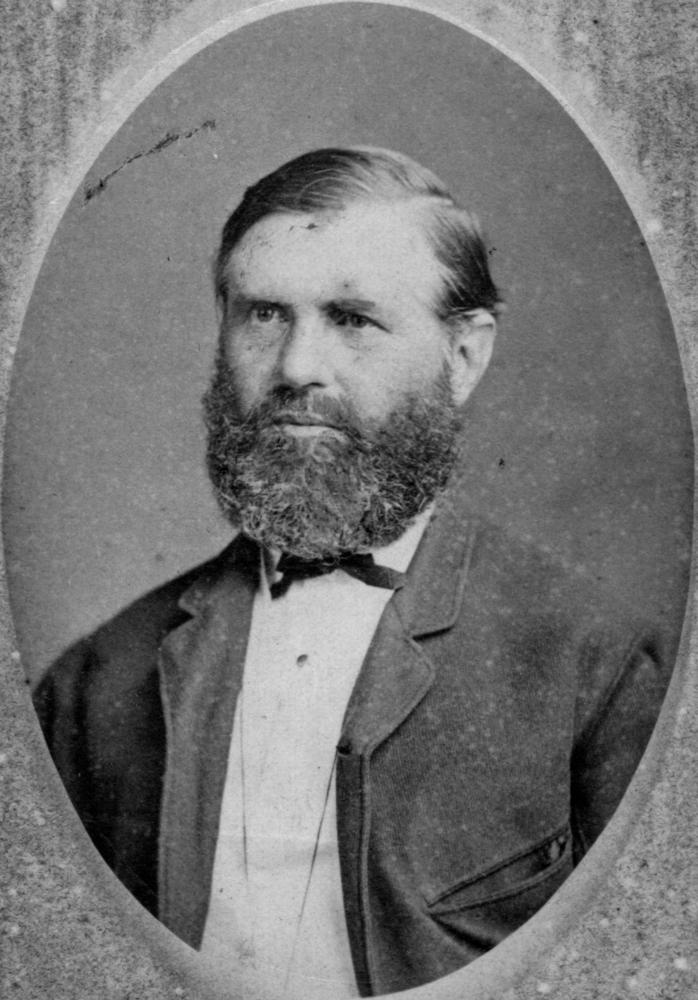
George Raff

In 1866, the Morayfield Plantation was established on the southern bank of the Caboolture River, approximately 40 kilometres (25 mi) north of Brisbane. The plantation was owned by George Raff, a former member of the Queensland Legislative Assembly, prominent Brisbane businessman and supporter of the use of indentured South Sea Islander labour in the sugar industry. Cane was grown at Morayfield for the production of sugar, rum and molasses between 1866 and 1889. Raff employed many South Sea Islander labourers in the cane fields during this period. Cane cultivation (and all related production) ceased around 1885–6. Raff died in 1889, with the plantation eventually sold for conversion to dairying in 1901.

In 1861 the Cabulture Cotton Company was formed by a group of settlers including George Raff, William Hobbs, Shepherd Smith, Robert Douglas and John Bramston. Raff was a prominent business identity in mid to late 19th century Queensland and was very active in public affairs. Born in Morayshire, Scotland in 1815, he emigrated to Australia in 1839 arriving in Sydney aboard the Earl Durham. In the 1840s he worked in the pastoral industry and as a merchant before moving to Brisbane in 1851. In Brisbane he soon established George Raff & Co., a shipping company with wharves on the Brisbane River situated adjacent to Customs House. Raff also founded the Queensland Mercantile and Agency Co., and became a director of the Queensland Steam Navigation Company in 1861. He strongly believed in separation from New South Wales and was one of the 26 members of Sir Robert Herbert's first Queensland Parliament. In 1860 Raff was appointed as a member of the Board of Education. He handed in his resignation as Member of the Legislative Assembly to the speaker of parliament in April 1864. He was re-elected and served again from November 1865, including a period as minister without portfolio in the Herbert and later Macalister ministries until November 1866. He again resigned from parliament in June 1867, only to go on and unsuccessfully contest the seat of Moreton in 1870.

In June 1861, the founders of the Cabulture Cotton Company sailed in the Breadalbane to explore the shores and rivers of Moreton Bay with the intention of selecting land for the purpose of growing cotton. The land selected became Portions 10 and 26, Parish of Caboolture, County of Stanley. After three unsuccessful seasons growing cotton, the Cabulture Cotton Company put the property up for sale. George Raff purchased Portion 10 in 1866 for £1000. Raff purchased additional land immediately adjacent to Portion 10. Portions 24 and 25 to the east were purchased in April 1867, and Portion 26 to the west in May 1868. Raff named his new property "Morayfields", which was later referred to as Morayfield in the early 1870s. Raff switched primary production to sugar cane, but between 1865 and 1868, the plantation continued producing some cotton. In 1868 it was reported that 5 bales of "New Orleans" variety cotton were shipped from Morayfield Plantation to London. By 1867 Raff's sugar cultivating, processing and distilling operations were well established. On 19 October of that year, the Brisbane Courier reported in detail the size and scope of his endeavours. Morayfield Plantation then consisted of 2,500 acres (1,000 ha) of land, the soil being described as "pretty deep" black alluvial, with cultivation on "one great plateau". The whole cultivation of sugar took up an area of 150 acres (61 ha) (60 acres (24 ha) more than on the adjacent Oaklands operation of Claudius Whish), and was chiefly of the "Bourbon" variety of cane. Living quarters were described as:

...consisting of a large mansion, manager's house, house for married workmen and their families, laborers' [sic] huts, stockyards, stables, sheds, carpenters' shops, blacksmiths' shop, stores, saw mill, and an innumerable number of other buildings

Additional housing for workers was also provided a little distance from the homestead complex.

A substantial sugar processing works is also described at this time. The works was situated about 200 yards (180 m) from the river and close to a large reservoir. The main building measured "120 feet square, 20 feet to the eaves, with a pyramidal roof rather than steep". The works were centred around a 30-horse beam engine worked from a large "multitubular boiler, fitted with a patented injector".

A distillery was also operating by 1867. It was described as being situated on one side of the main sugar processing works building, and being of "Shears" patent, 600 imperial gallons (2,700 L; 720 US gal), with three rectifying or condensing boxes above the still head, producing a strong spirit by one operation.

In 1866, Raff constructed a 3-foot (0.91 m) gauge private tramway to transport cane harvested from nearby fields to the mill, and sugar to the wharf. Cane was loaded by hand onto railway trucks, which held, on average 1 long ton (1.0 t) each. Two trucks formed a train. In October 1867, all hauling was performed by horse, though a small Aveling and Porter locomotive was in use in the saw mill. At that time, the railway was measured at ? mile in length from the fields to the sugar works, and described as "very well formed", on cross heavy logs, with longitudinal sleepers under the plates, and the gauge was three feet.

Another visit was made to the plantation one year later by John Dunmore Lang and published in the Brisbane Courier in 1868. He described the total land under cultivation as being 160 acres (65 ha), though this could have been increased to 300 acres (120 ha) if desired. The majority of cane was still of the "Bourbon" variety though 60 acres (24 ha) of "Rattoon" cane (stems or shoots from the second years' growth of a sugar cane plant) and an unknown quantity of "Ribbon" cane (a subtropical type of cane) was noted. Lang described the tramway as being "an eccentric elipse [sic], traversing the whole plantation." The railway measured 2 miles (3.2 km) in length, had cost £2,000 to build, but still relied on animal power. By 1870, the line was described as 2 to 3 miles (3.2 to 4.8 km) in length and Raff had run his 8-ton locomotive engine over it. Raff is believed to be the first to use a locomotive driven tramway on a Queensland sugar plantation.

Lang notes the presence of South Sea Islander labourers at Morayfield Plantation in 1868. South Sea Islanders (also referred to as Kanakas at the time) made a major contribution to Queensland's early sugar industry, with between 55,000 and 62,000 individuals being brought here between 1863 and 1904 as indentured labourers usually bound to a three-year contract. George Raff was a prominent supporter of the use of an Islander labour force, as was his immediate neighbour at Oaklands, Claudius Buchanan Whish. Raff was considered one of the "masters" of the trade and a very large employer of Islander labour. He became prominent as one of the abettors of the system in his testimony before a Parliamentary Committee. Islanders provided cheap manual labour, but were also considered essential in a climate considered too harsh for white manual labourers. Most came from eighty islands in Melanesia, mainly those included in present-day Vanuatu and the Solomon Islands. The method of recruitment involved some instances of kidnap and deception, while the numbers of Islander people brought to Queensland by these illegal means is a matter for debate.

It is unclear how many Islanders were present at Morayfield Plantation or when Raff first employed them. Lang noted during his 1868 visit the presence of 65 Islanders speaking 5 different languages, working and living on the plantation. Other sources claim about 70 people in total employed on Morayfield Plantation in 1868, of which 15 to 20 were Islanders.

Lang provides descriptions of the contrasting European workers' accommodation and that of the South Sea Islander labourers. The European workmen and their families were provided with "a row of comfortable brick cottages", while the Islander labourers were supplied with a large single timber structure with corrugated iron roof measuring "upwards of eighty feet by forty" and painted on the outside. Sleeping accommodation was described as consisting of

...a raised platform stretching along each side of the building, like the berths in the steerage of a ship, each of the inmates sleeping on his blanket on the boards, the fire for cooking their provisions being on the floor in the centre of the building, around which they congregate in the evening, after the labors[sic] of the day, as in their native isles.

One other description of the Islander accommodation was that it consisted of a "circular structure" located close to the river bank. By 1925 this structure was used by share farmers for housing and feeding young calves.

Lang also notes the presence of an additional brick building on the plantation, a "commodious wharf" on the river for landing or embarking goods and people, and a schoolhouse which doubled as a church. Lang described the conduct of a Presbyterian service at the schoolhouse, at which a number of the South Sea Islanders attended, were literate, and read a portion of scripture in their own language. These Islanders were described as being from the Island of Mare, the southernmost island of the Loyalty Island Group (New Caledonia).

It was not uncommon for Islander labourers to abscond from their employers when conditions were poor. They were commonly provided with insufficient and poor quality food and inadequate clothing. This was particularly the case on those properties located in the more temperate areas of southern Queensland where the cooler temperatures in winter were completely foreign to many of the Islander labourers. In early 1869, eighteen men, originally from the New Hebrides (Vanuatu) and then employed at Morayfield Plantation, fled the plantation for Brisbane. Raff sought a court order in an attempt to force them back to work, which they refused. At their court appearance in January 1869, three Mare men by the names of Tarbucket (alias Kichelho), John Bull and Louis, claimed the reason they left was that Mr Raff was not providing them with enough food or "ki-ki". They also expressed the belief that their agreements had expired after one year, even though Raff explained that they had agreed to three year work agreements, and that they wanted to return to Mare. The court ruled in Raff's favour and forced the men to return to Morayfield.

Lang, however, reports that Raff treated his Islander labour force "well", paying them at the rate of 10 shillings a month with rations, and under engagements of 3 years. Each man received a pound of beef per day and worked until 6pm. Raff purchased much of this beef from the local area, particularly from the McConnels of Durundur station, near Woodford.

At the end of 1868, the Chief Inspector of Distilleries reported that the Morayfield Plantation had 190 acres (77 ha) of land under cultivation with cane, of which 60 acres (24 ha) had been crushed. The total amount of rum distilled since the commencement of operation in October 1867 was 18,431 imperial gallons (83,790 L; 22,135 US gal). The amount of sugar manufactured in 1868 was 100 long tons (100 t), and molasses 12,000 imperial gallons (55,000 L; 14,000 US gal).

On 10 October 1869, Levi Walker, a labourer from Heap, near Bury in Lancashire, England, drowned in the Caboolture River. Walker arrived in Australia just 5 weeks earlier on 6 September 1869 aboard the Star Queen. No additional information on Levi Walker has been located and his grave is marked with a headstone erected on the southern bank of the Caboolture River.

Sugar cane cultivation and processing continued on Morayfield Plantation throughout the 1870s. In the 1870s, sugar was being regularly shipped from its wharf to Brisbane via small steamers such as the Tadorna Radjah and the Gneering, both owned by William Pettigrew. In 1877, it was reported that 60 acres (24 ha) of cane was present, about 40 acres (16 ha) under prairie grass, and the remainder of the estate (3,000 - 4,000 acres (1,600 ha)), in pasture for cattle and horses.

It is unclear, however, the amount of time Raff and his family actually spent on the plantation, as he maintained a separate residence in New Farm, Brisbane, called "Moray Bank".

During the 1870s, South Sea Islander workers were progressively returned to their home islands as their work agreement expired, and were replaced with others from different islands, including three boys from the Island of Sandwich. From 1884 the use of Islanders as labourers was progressively restricted through legislation, starting with an amendment to the Pacific Islanders Labourers Act 1880, which banned them from a range of work and constrained their employment to menial agricultural jobs. Concerns had been and were being voiced by humanitarian and church groups, as well as unions regarding the use and conditions of this labour force. Further legislation sought to end their employment entirely; however this was not finally achieved until after Federation with the Immigration Restriction Act 1901 and the Pacific Islander Labourers Act 1901, the latter of which required deportation of Islanders to begin after December 1906. Of the more than 9000 Islanders in Queensland in 1901, only 1654 were given permission to stay. The last deportation took place in July 1908.

The valuation register of 1880 noted a number of improvements to Morayfield Plantation though there is no indication as to where on the property such improvements were made. The improvements listed include a dwelling, mill house, two bonded stores, bone house, carpenters' shop, cotton shed, stable, octagon building, Kanakas' outhouse, bakery, managers' dwellings, store, Kanakas' house, eight cottages, hayshed, schoolhouse, kitchen and stables.

The Morayfield Plantation continued cultivating cane and producing rum until the mid-1880s. The Chief Inspector of Distilleries, in his annual report of 1885, noted that there was no work at the Morayfield Plantation distillery that year. The Inspector of Distilleries in Morayfield during 1887 reported a flood on the Caboolture River, but no damage to distillery. In August 1889 however, it was noted that the Morayfield distillery had closed and in May 1891 tenders were invited for the purchase and removal of the sugar mill.

George Raff died on 28 August 1889 at his "Moray Bank" home in New Farm. Ownership of the Morayfield Plantation transferred to three of his surviving sons - Alexander, Robert and Harry.

The land on which the Morayfield Plantation was built has changed ownership several times since Raff's death. Subsequent owners of the property used the land mainly for dairying purposes, including share farming. William Henry Jackson purchased the land from the Raff family and trustees in 1901. A 1903 description of the former plantation area states:

"traces of the old sugar mill, Kanakas" huts, rum bonds and the miles of furrows and drains still show here and there and the great sheet of water known as "the Dam" still exists; but since the "sixties" the old place has seen so many changes that what may be termed relics of those way-back times only remain.

By 1903, the property was divided into 19 paddocks, 6 of which were cultivated, with the rest used for dairy cattle. A dip had been built and 400 head of cattle (250 for dairying) were being grazed. A dairy shed was also erected on the site of the plantation-period horse stables, close to the Caboolture River. Associated dairying infrastructure was also installed, including a turbine steam engine and "de Laval" 150 imperial gallons (680 L; 180 US gal) separator.

The property was sold again in 1909 to James Buchanan, in 1947 to William George Currant, to Douglas Ashe and James Rowe in 1948, and in 1951 the whole of Portion 10 was sold to Charles Thomas Williams.

In 1960, Portion 10 was again sold to the A.P.M. Forests Pty Ltd and a pine plantation established across the property. Much of the surviving infrastructure from the plantation period is believed to have been removed during that period of ownership. Some equipment, particularly several boilers dating from the plantation-period are allegedly still buried on the site. A.P.M. later sold the land and most of the pine was sold to a local mill or chipped on site. The land has since been sold to Northeast Business Park Pty Ltd for redevelopment as a commercial centre.

== Description ==
The boundaries of Lot 10 have remained intact since it was originally surveyed as Portion 10 in the 1860s. While use of the area has changed over time (cotton - sugar - dairying - pine plantation - proposed business park), the nature of these activities may have had limited impact on the integrity of the archaeological record. While the visible, above ground archaeological artefacts lack integrity as evidenced by their ruinous state, the soil profile of the former plantation area (i.e. deep alluvial soils) suggests that the area has potential to contain subsurface archaeological deposits with the possibility of some stratification, especially due to proximity to the Caboolture River, the low-lying nature of the surrounding lands, and a history of flooding. Soils closest to the river are generally sands and mud and areas close to the river generally have a deep alluvial soil profile, while those areas on higher ridgelines are likely to be shallower.

Archaeological remains which relate to Raff's occupation and use of the area are located in the northern portion of Lot 10, close to the Caboolture River and around the margin of a lagoon. While information on the full layout of the complex is incomplete, it is possible to identify several key elements from the results of previous field investigations and historical and aerial photograph interpretation, including the location of Raff's residence, exotic gardens and plantings, two wells, stores, stables, a fence line, the sawmill site, and part of the tramway formation.

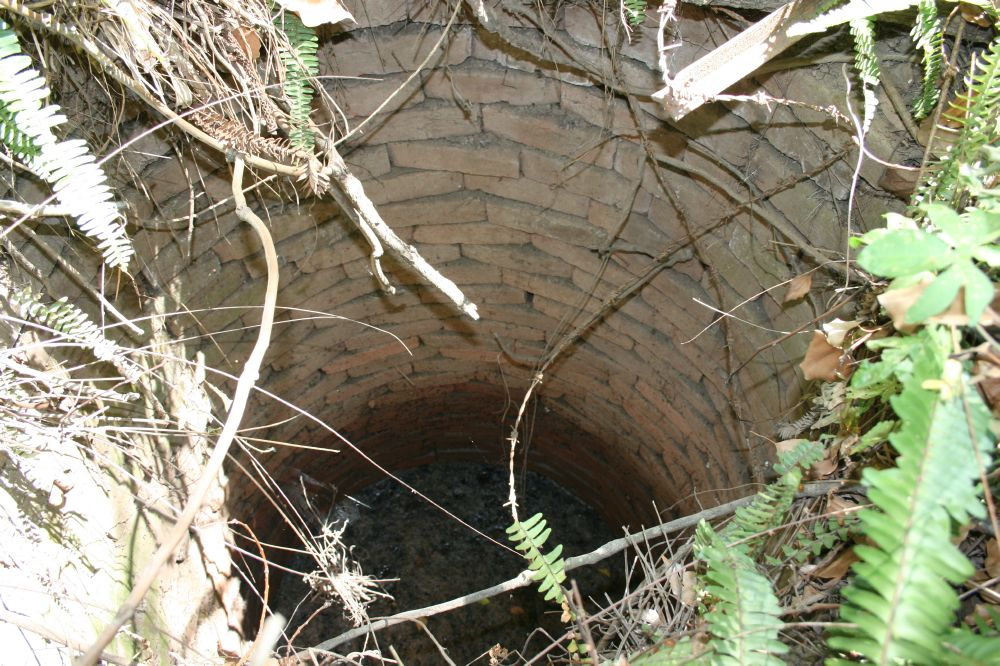
Bricklined well behind the main house site, 2009

A set of 13 steps (rendered stone base with later brick additions) and the remains of a brick and sandstone wall with patches of render still visible are found at approximately (MGA94 Zone 56) 499685E, 7001805N. These steps are associated with the Morayfield Plantation homestead. The site is approached from the south-west by an indistinct roadway at 499585E, 7001789N whose furthest extent is marked by a camphor laurel tree at 499485E, 7001737N. Unmarked and handmade bricks, sandstone pieces and blocks with render are scattered in the vicinity of the steps. A brick-lined well is also found behind the house site and connected by a brick-paved floor. Exotic plantings, including two groves of bamboo and two palm trees, evenly spaced to either side of the set of stairs, as well as bunya trees are located in the immediate vicinity.

A timber post and rail yard is located close to the Caboolture River and the north-east extent of the lagoon. The yard is likely related to the dairying activities on the property in the early 20th century. The site is known to have featured a tin and timber dairy building up to 1960. However the yard remains do overlie earlier structures. This is evidenced by the presence of a closely packed brick surface underneath cracked sections of concrete.

A second brick-lined well, filled with sediment, is located on the north-eastern side of the yards. It is not known when this well was constructed, but size and construction pattern are similar to the well located near the former Morayfield Plantation homestead. The well is also located in close proximity to the location of the former bond stores, stable, wharf and tramway which are known to have been constructed sometime before 1873.

Possible remains of the "commodious wharf" noted by Lang in 1868 are found above the waterline include a single large in situ timber post at 499893E, 7002031N and numerous metal artefacts, including horseshoes, circular collars, heavy straps and bolts, which are eroding out of the river bank at 499886E, 7002022N. Based on an 1873 historical photograph of this area and aerial photography, the wharf is thought to be located adjacent to these finds. Archaeological investigations at other historic wharf sites in Queensland and interstate have revealed rich archaeological deposits at such locations, even in the absence of structural remains above the waterline, and also significant archaeological deposits in maritime zones where dredging has occurred. There is therefore good potential for archaeological artefacts that were lost overboard or discarded from ships, or the wharf deck itself, to be situated in the vicinity of the former wharf area and within the riverbed out to the mid-channel of the Caboolture River.

The remains of a post and rail fence line cross the lagoon immediately east of the main house ruins. This fence line is also visible in the 1873 photograph and therefore is considered to be physical evidence of Raff's operations on the site. Adjacent to this is a vehicle access track located near the southeast extent of the lagoon. Handmade bricks and a rusting boiler (unknown make) which is located in the vicinity of the former sawmill site and tramway are located adjacent the track. A slightly raised and linear area immediately east of the track is interpreted as remnants of the tramway line that once ran from the mill to the wharf area. The area around the former sawmill site and this tramway formation is considered an area of high archaeological potential.

To the north and northeast of the former sawmill site in the vicinity of the cattle yards at 499892E, 7001981N and in a nearby small grove of bunya pines at 499955E, 702058N are two metal rails which may have formed part of the former tramway. Also concealed within the bunya pine grove is a rendered brick machinery foundation and a rusted metal tank - similar to a ship or steam engine's water tank, but also possibly an artefact relating to the early sugar manufacturing processes at the site. Nearby, a feature of unknown function is set into the ground and is partially filled with concrete, forming a bowl with a surrounding metal rim.

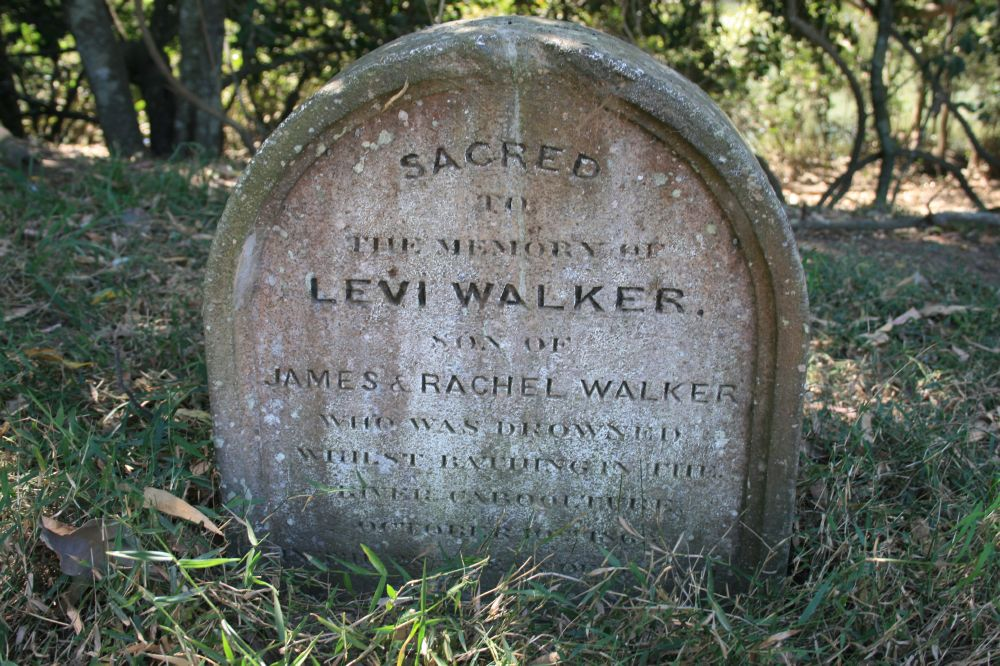
Headstone for Levi Walker, 2009

The lone grave of Levi Walker is located on the southern bank of the Caboolture River at 499218E, 7001824N. The headstone reads "Sacred to the memory of Levi Walker, son of James and Rachel Walker, who was drowned whilst bathing in the River Caboolture, 10th October 1869, in the 28th year of his age." While it is not impossible that additional graves exist on the property, no physical evidence of such graves survives though any unmarked graves would be of archaeological potential and importance.

Potential exists across the area for archaeological evidence associated with the Morayfield Plantation. It is reasonable to assume that archaeological potential also exists for evidence relating to Islander and white labourer accommodation, the remains of the sugar mill and distillery and additional tramway infrastructure.

== Heritage listing ==
Morayfield Plantation was listed on the Queensland Heritage Register on 13 May 2011 having satisfied the following criteria.

The Morayfield Plantation is representative of one of the earliest developments in Queensland's influential sugar industry, dating from the earliest phase in southern Queensland.

The Morayfield Plantation contains important archaeological artefacts associated with George Raff's ownership of the property, beginning in 1866 until his death in 1889. George Raff was a prominent early citizen in Queensland who made a major contribution to the development of the sugar industry and notably used South Sea Islanders as indentured labourers.

Several artefacts and ruins have been located above ground and are considered important in-situ elements - i.e. remnant stairs, wells, handmade bricks, brick-paved floors, exotic plantings, structural foundations and remnant wall features. There exists potential for subsurface deposits of archaeological artefacts, especially additional building foundations, footings and domestic refuse, to be located in the locality of these above-ground elements. Any archaeological artefacts found at this place have potential to provide important information on key aspects of Queensland history, particularly the development of early sugar growing, cultivation, processing and distilling operations, and the role of South Sea Islander peoples in Queensland's sugar industry. The identification of domestic refuse has potential to provide important insights into the everyday lives of those people who lived and worked on the plantation; lives that are not well documented elsewhere. Archaeological investigations of such artefacts would help illustrate the differences in living conditions between Islanders and other labourers who worked in Queensland's early sugar industry.

Archaeological investigations at the place could provide important comparative material culture evidence about the processes, practices and techniques of early sugar production. Archaeological evidence may reveal important insights into methods that are undocumented and no longer practiced. Evidence of this nature has potential to provide an important insight into early sugar practice in southeast Queensland and provide rare comparative information for our understanding of other early sugar producing places, particularly the nearby Oaklands Sugar Mill remnants.

Archaeological investigations around the plantation wharf area and within the adjacent riverbed may reveal structural elements and archaeological artefacts relating to plantation operations, the working life of the wharf and the economic development of the region. Remains may consist of materials associated with the construction, repair and maintenance of the wharf itself. As objects were often deliberately or accidentally dropped from wharves during loading and unloading operations, archaeological artefacts relating to the shipping of cargo to and from the plantation and the greater Caboolture area have potential to survive submerged in the vicinity. The study of such archaeological artefacts may reveal important information on primary production in the area, consumption choices and patterns in material culture, distribution networks for goods coming to and going from the plantation, and the nutrition and diet of the people living on the plantation and in the broader region at the time.

Few places associated with early indentured labourers from the South Sea Islands have survived in Southern Queensland (see particularly Oaklands Sugar Mill at Morayfield and Ormiston House Estate in Ormiston, Redland City). The potential for archaeological artefacts associated with these labourers makes the Morayfield Plantation an important source of information about the use of indentured labour in Queensland and an important comparative place for the analysis of South Sea Islander heritage places found in Southern Queensland and across the state. Potential for archaeological artefacts belonging to plantation owners, managers, and the South Sea Islander labour force exists, enabling important research questions to be posited, particularly in relation to status and class, the use of power, control and resistance to that control, the exploitation and organisation of labour, and adaptation to new environments.

== See also ==
- List of tramways in Queensland
