= Morayfield railway station =

Railway station in Queensland, Australia

Morayfield
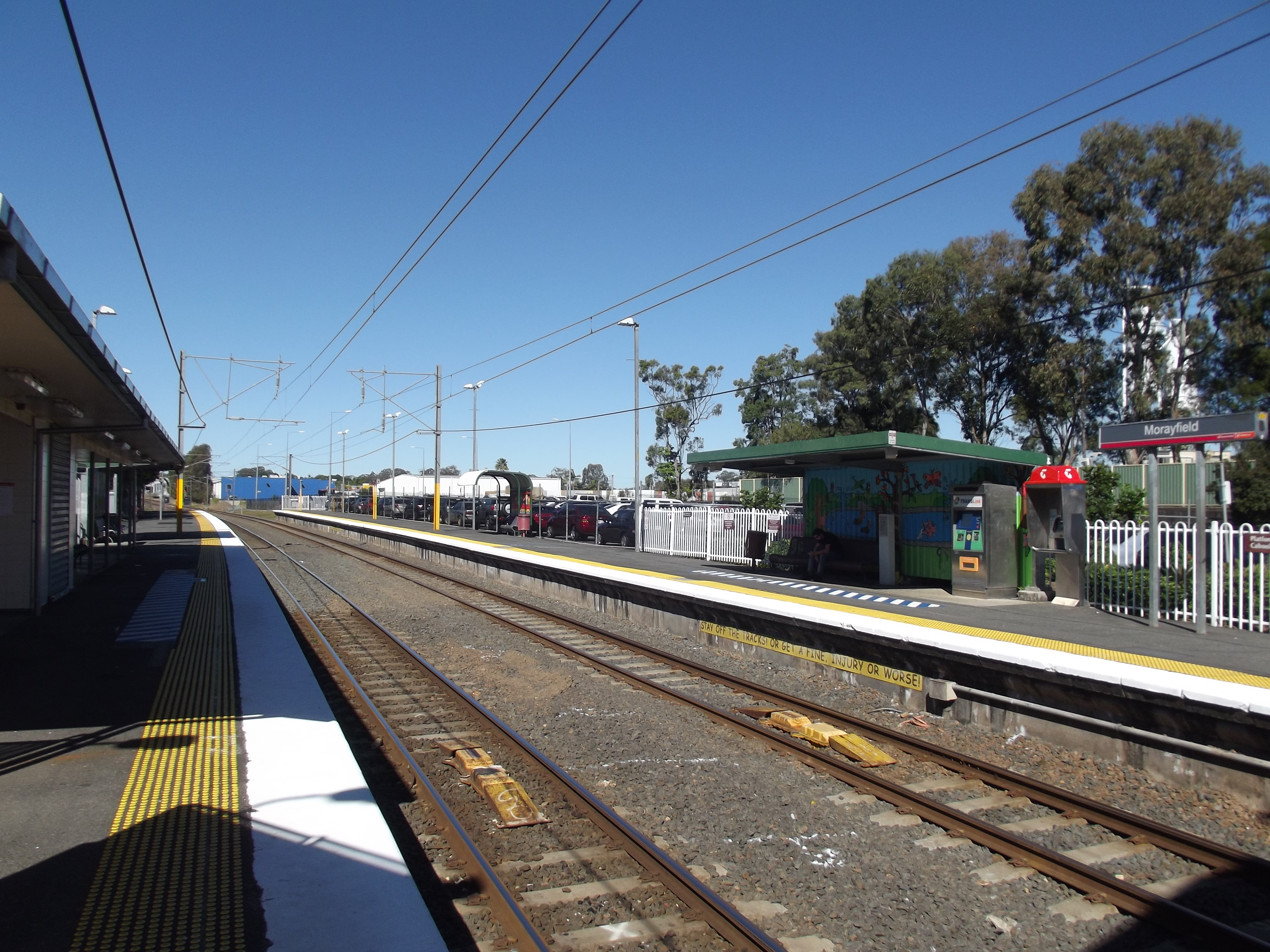
- Southbound view from Platform 1 in July 2012

General information
- Location: Visentin Road, Morayfield
- Coordinates: 27°6′36″S 152°57′8″E
- Elevation: 8 m (26 ft)
- Owner: Queensland Rail
- Operator: Queensland Rail
- Lines: T1 Caboolture; T1 Nambour/Gympie North
- Distance: 46.45 kilometres from Central
- Platforms: 2 side

Construction
- Structure type: Ground
- Parking: 233 bays
- Accessible: Yes

Other information
- Status: Staffed
- Station code: 600474 (platform 1); 600475 (platform 2)
- Fare zone: Zone 3
- Website: Queensland Rail

History
- Opened: 1888; 138 years ago

Services
Preceding station	Queensland Rail	Following station
Burpengary towards Ipswich or Rosewood via Roma Street	T1 Caboolture line	Caboolture Terminus
Burpengary towards Ipswich or Rosewood via Roma Street	T1 Nambour/Gympie North line	Caboolture towards Nambour
Location

Morayfield is a railway station operated by Queensland Rail on the Caboolture and Nambour/Gympie North lines. It opened in 1888 and serves the Moreton Bay suburb of Morayfield. It is a ground level station, featuring two side platforms.

== Services ==
Morayfield station is served by all Citytrain network services from Nambour and Caboolture to Central, many continuing to Springfield Central, Ipswich and Rosewood.

== Platforms and services ==
Morayfield platform arrangement
Platform	Lines	Destinations	Notes
1	T1 Caboolture	Roma Street (to Ipswich/Rosewood line)	
1	T1 Nambour/Gympie North	Roma Street (to Ipswich/Rosewood line)	
2	T1 Caboolture	Caboolture	
2	T1 Nambour/Gympie North	Nambour	
