= Morayfield, Queensland =

Morayfield
- Town
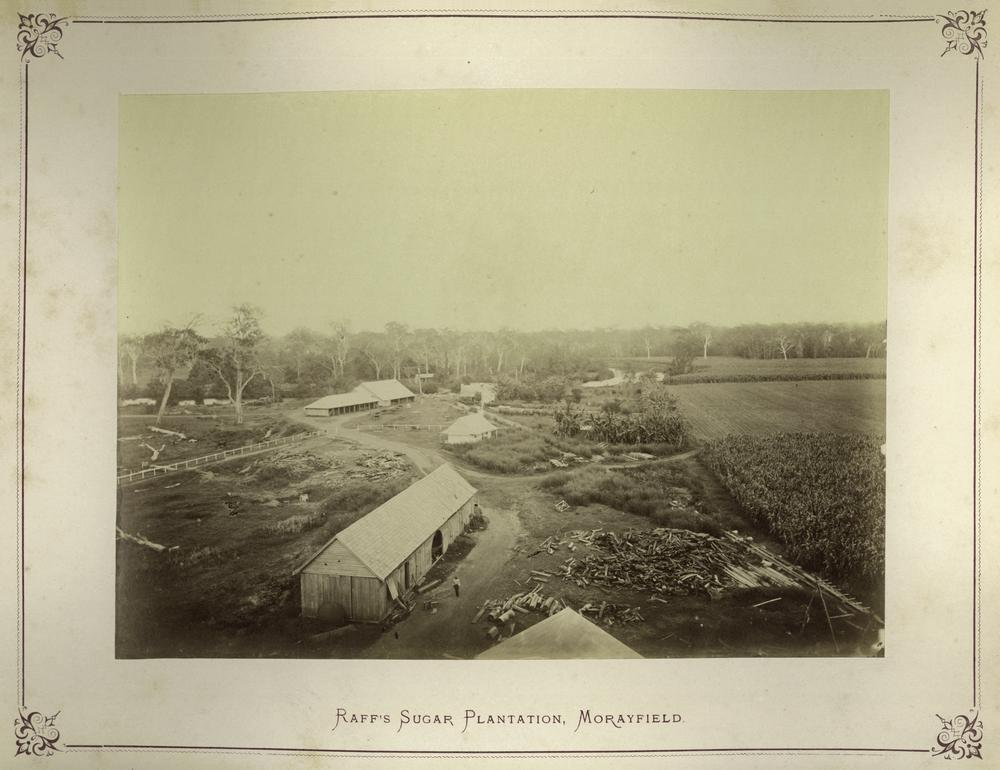
- Raff's Sugar Plantation, 1874

- Interactive map of Morayfield
- Coordinates: 27.1052°S 152.9477°E
- Country: Australia
- State: Queensland
- City: Moreton Bay
- LGA: City of Moreton Bay
- Location: 2.3 km (1.4 mi) S of Caboolture; 45.8 km (28.5 mi) N of Brisbane CBD

Government
  - State electorates: Bancroft; Morayfield
  - Federal division: Longman

Area
  - Total: 44.5 km^{2} (17.2 sq mi)

Population
  - Total: 24,898 (2021 census)
  - Density: 559.5/km^{2} (1,449.1/sq mi)
- Time zone: UTC+10:00 (AEST)
- Postcode: 4506
Localities around Morayfield
Bellmere	Caboolture South	Caboolture
Upper Caboolture	Morayfield	Beachmere; Burpengary East
Moorina	Narangba	Burpengary

Morayfield is a town and suburb in the City of Moreton Bay, Queensland, Australia. In the 2021 census, the suburb of Morayfield had a population of 24,898 people.

Morayfield is 44.5 kilometres (27.7 mi) by road north of Brisbane CBD, the state capital.

== Geography ==
Morayfield is a mostly residential suburb, consisting mainly of low-set brick homes and some semi-rural acreage. The main commercial area is concentrated along Morayfield Road and includes the Morayfield Shopping Centre. The suburb is situated in the Burpengary Creek catchment area.

The Bruce Highway and Caboolture railway line passes from south to north through the suburb.

== History ==
In 1868, Brisbane man George Raff bought some of the land held by the failed Caboolture Cotton Company, calling it "Moray Field", derived from Raff's native Morayshire in Scotland. It was often written as "Morayfields" and, from 1881, became "Morayfield".

Caboolture State School opened in present-day Morayfield on 4 August 1873. In 1890, it was renamed Caboolture South State School. In 1908, it was renamed Morayfield State School. The original school building is still on the site and is heritage-listed. (This school should not be confused with the current Caboolture State School in Caboolture when originally opened in 1889 and was then known as Caboolture North State School).

Morayfield State High School opened on 27 January 1981 and in 2023 had over 1600 students enrolled.

Until the mid-1980s, Morayfield remained a rural area consisting of a small dairy holding and small crop farming enterprises. However, with the population pressure caused by the rapid growth of the greater Brisbane area, it has seen significant residential development and rapid population growth.

Morayfield East State School opened on 29 January 1991.

Minimbah State School opened on 28 January 1997.

Morayfield Shopping Centre opened on 14 April 1997 with an expansion in 2005.

In January 2011, parts of Morayfield were flooded during the 2010-2011 Queensland floods.

Carmichael College opened as a private primary school in 2015. In 2020, it introduced secondary schooling and plans to offer all years through to Year 12 by 2025.

== Demographics ==
Year	Population	Notes
1911	96	
1954	221	
1986	2,305	
1996	15,496	
2001	16,781	
2006	18,020	
2011	19,346	
2016	21,394	
2021	24,898	

In the 2016 census, the suburb of Morayfield had a population of 21,394 people, 51.5% female and 48.5% male. The median age of the Morayfield population was 32 years, 6 years below the national median of 38. 77.2% of people living in Morayfield were born in Australia. The other top responses for country of birth were New Zealand 5.5%, England 3.3%, Philippines 0.7%, South Africa 0.6%, Papua New Guinea 0.5%. 88.2% of people spoke only English at home; the next most common languages were Samoan 0.8%, Mandarin 0.5%, Korean 0.4%, Tagalog 0.3% and German 0.2%.

In the 2021 census, Morayfield had a population of 24,898 people.

== Heritage listings ==
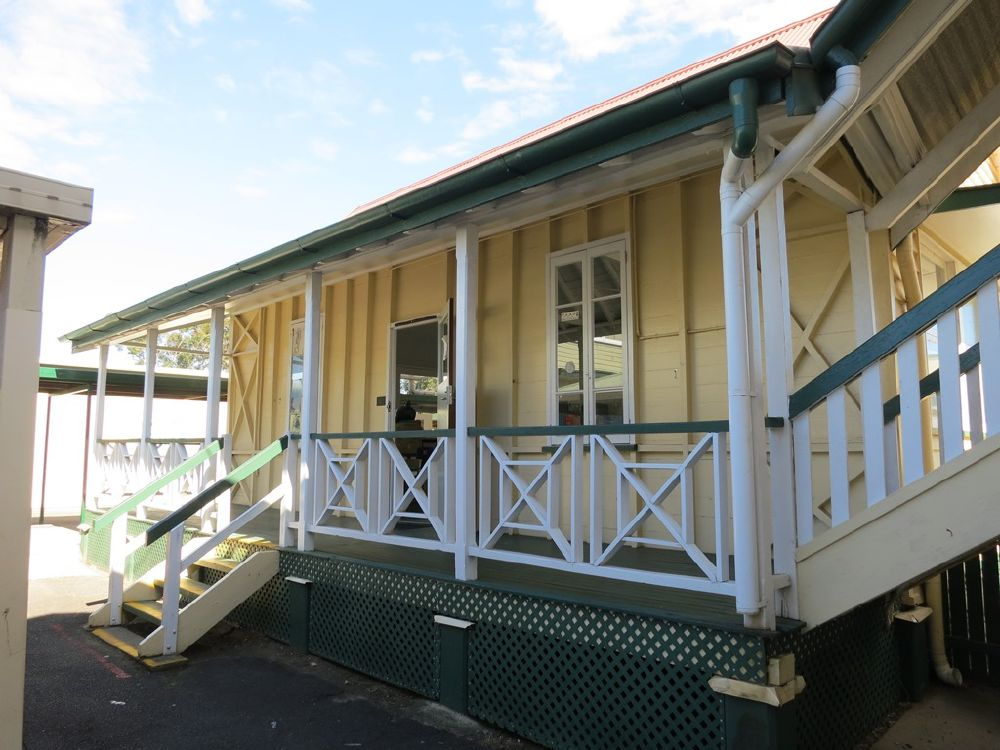
Original building, Morayfield State School, 2014

Morayfield has a number of heritage-listed sites, including:

- Oaklands Sugar Mill, 68 Captain Whish Avenue (27.0963°S 152.9744°E)
- Morayfield State School, 196–230 Morayfield Road
- Morayfield Plantation, 34 Nolan Drive ( 27.1055°S 153.0015°E)

== Education ==
Morayfield State School is a government primary (Prep–6) school for boys and girls at 196–230 Morayfield Road (27.1065°S 152.9472°E). In 2017, the school had an enrolment of 554 students with 46 teachers (44 full-time equivalent) and 33 non-teaching staff (23 full-time equivalent). It includes a special education program.

Minimbah State School is a government primary (Prep–6) school for boys and girls at the corner Walkers Road and Minimbah Drive (27.1107°S 152.9243°E). In 2017, the school had an enrolment of 802 students with 57 teachers (51 full-time equivalent) and 29 non-teaching staff (18 full-time equivalent). It includes a special education program.

Morayfield East State School is a government primary (Prep–6) school for boys and girls at 107 Graham Road (27.1168°S 152.9669°E). In 2023, the school had an enrolment of 973 students. It includes a special education program.

Carmichael College is a private primary and secondary (Prep–12) school for boys and girls at 793-833 Oakey Flat Road (27.1729°S 152.9185°E). In 2017, the school had an enrolment of 158 students with 16 teachers (14 full-time equivalent) and 6 non-teaching staff (3 full-time equivalent). The school is named after Irish missionary Amy Carmichael. The Creekside Community Church (one of the Christian Community Churches of Australia) is on the school campus and supports the school.

Morayfield State High School is a government secondary (7–12) school for boys and girls at Visentin Road (27.1090°S 152.9533°E). In 2023, the school had an enrolment of 1,687 students. It includes a special education program.

== Transport ==
Morayfield railway station provides access to regular Queensland Rail City network services to Brisbane and Ipswich, as well as Caboolture and the Sunshine Coast. Morayfield Road is a major road that passes through both Morayfield and Caboolture. Most of the region's shops are situated on this major road, including the Morayfield Shopping Centre.

All bus services in Morayfield travel ether via or to/from the Morayfield Bus Station located at 171 Morayfield Road adjacent to Devereaux Drive with access to Morayfield Shopping Centre (27.1032°S 152.9489°E). Buses also travel to Morayfield railway station except for Buses 660 which travels along Morayfield Road bypassing the railway station and route 9999 that terminates at Morayfield Bus Station.

The 667 local loop bus service provides transport throughout southern portion of the suburb connecting it to other bus services at Morayfield Bus Station and train services at Morayfield railway station. The 656 service runs a loop to Upper Caboolture and connects to train services at Morayfield railway station and bus services at Morayfield Bus Station. Bus routes 653 and 654 provides a connection to Caboolture South and Bellmere with a connection to train services at both Morayfield and Caboolture railway stations. Bus route 651 travels from Morayfield railway station via Morayfield Road to northern Caboolture and back providing a bus connection to both Morayfield and Caboolture railway stations. The 660 bus also travels to Morayfield Bus Station providing connections to Redcliffe, Caboolture, Burpengary and Deception Bay. Bus 9999 is a service that operates from Donnybrook and Toorbul on Thursday morning and afternoon that provides connection to Caboolture and Morayfield Bus Station. There is also a bus service from Kilcoy through the QConnect network under route number 895. This service services Woodford, D'Agulair, Wamuran, Caboolture and terminates at Morayfield Bus Station.

== See also ==
- List of tramways in Queensland
