= Deception Bay (Queensland) =

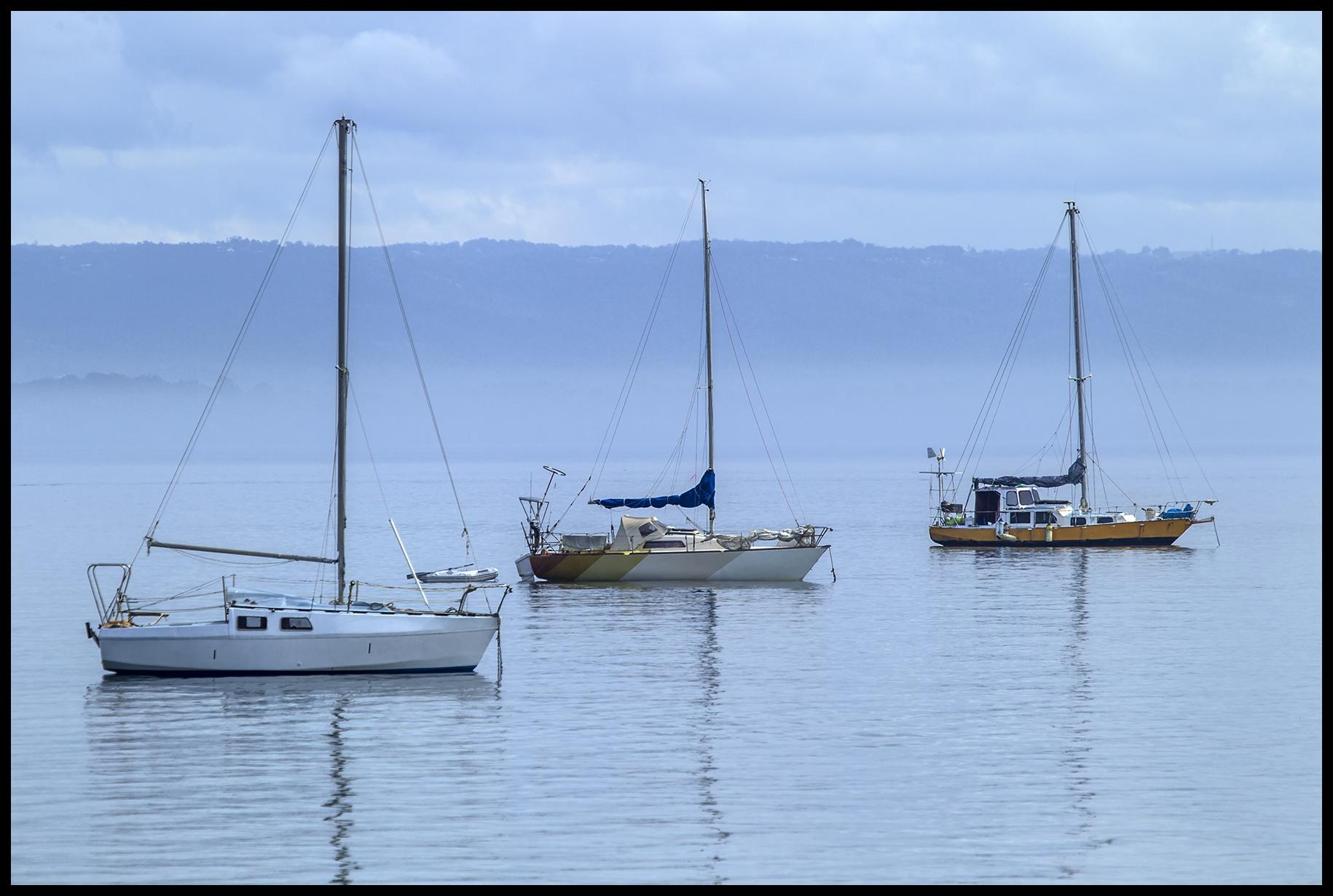
- Deception Bay

- Location within Queensland
- Location: South-East Queensland
- Coordinates: 27.1492°S 153.0922°E
- Type: Bay
- Part of: Moreton Bay
- River sources: Caboolture River, Burpengary Creek
- Primary outflows: Pumicestone Passage
- Ocean/sea sources: Pacific Ocean
- Basin countries: Australia

Deception Bay is a bay within Moreton Bay in the City of Moreton Bay, Queensland, Australia. The bay is shallow. It contains some seagrass beds.

== Geography ==
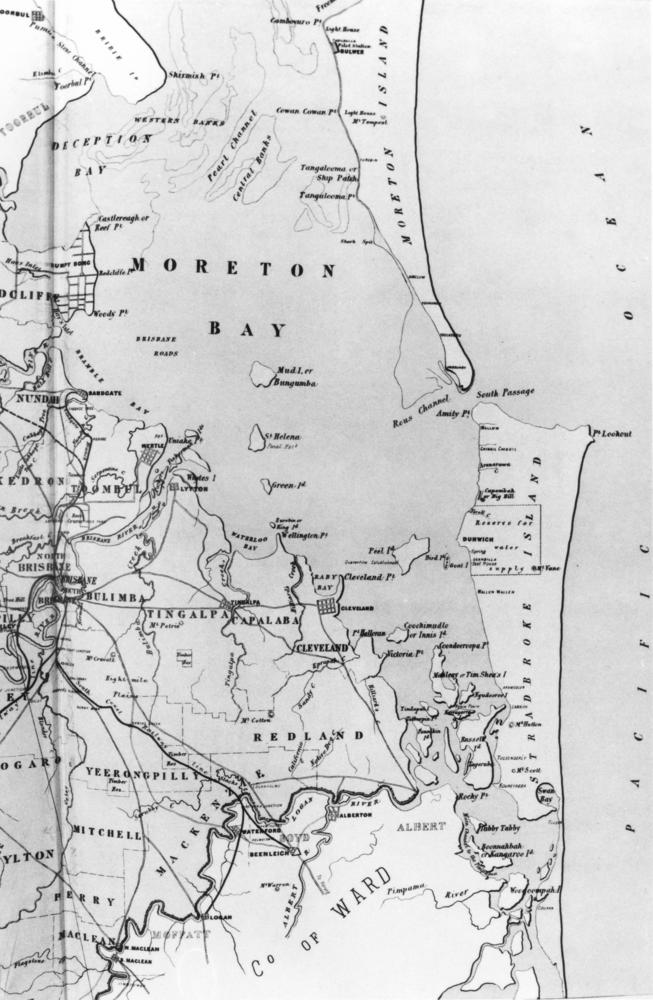
Map of Moreton Bay showing Deception Bay in the north-west, 1886

Deception Bay is in the most north-western part of Moreton Bay, north of the Redcliffe Peninsula and south of Bribie Island. The Caboolture River flows into the bay. Increased urban development has seen the river bring sediment loadings into the bay.

== History ==
In 1823, John Oxley originally named it Pumice Stone River believing it was a river because it was very shallow. Its present name refers Oxley being deceived by its appearance.
