= Caboolture River =

Caboolture
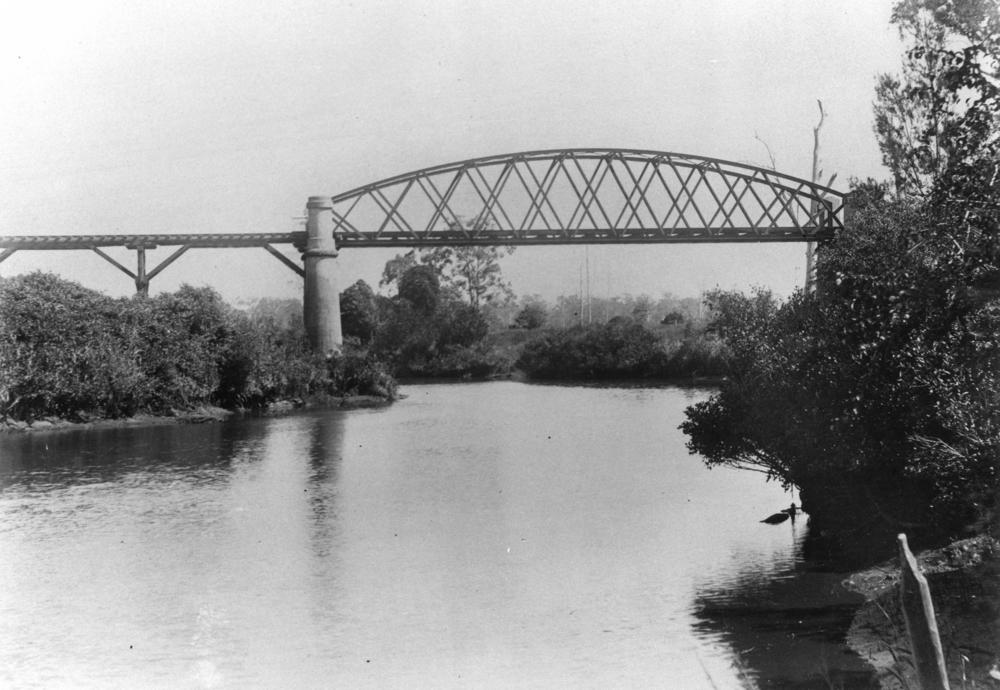
- Railway Bridge over the Caboolture River, 1907

- Location of the Caboolture River mouth in Queensland
- Etymology: Kabi Yugarabul dialect: Derived Kabultur to Caboolture, meaning "place of the carpet snake".

Location
- Country: Australia
- State: Queensland
- Region: South East Queensland
- Local government area: City of Moreton Bay
- City: Caboolture

Physical characteristics
- Source: D'Aguilar Range
  - location: below Campbells Pocket
  - coordinates: 27°7′32″S 152°48′20″E
  - elevation: 262 m (860 ft)
- Mouth: Deception Bay, Moreton Bay
  - location: south of Beachmere
  - coordinates: 27°09′09″S 153°02′48″E
  - elevation: 0 m (0 ft)
- Length: 46 km (29 mi)
- Basin size: 468 km^{2} (181 sq mi)

Basin features
- Tributaries
  - left: Wararba Creek, Lagoon Creek
- National park: D'Aguilar National Park

The Caboolture River is a small river in South East Queensland, Australia.

== Location and features ==
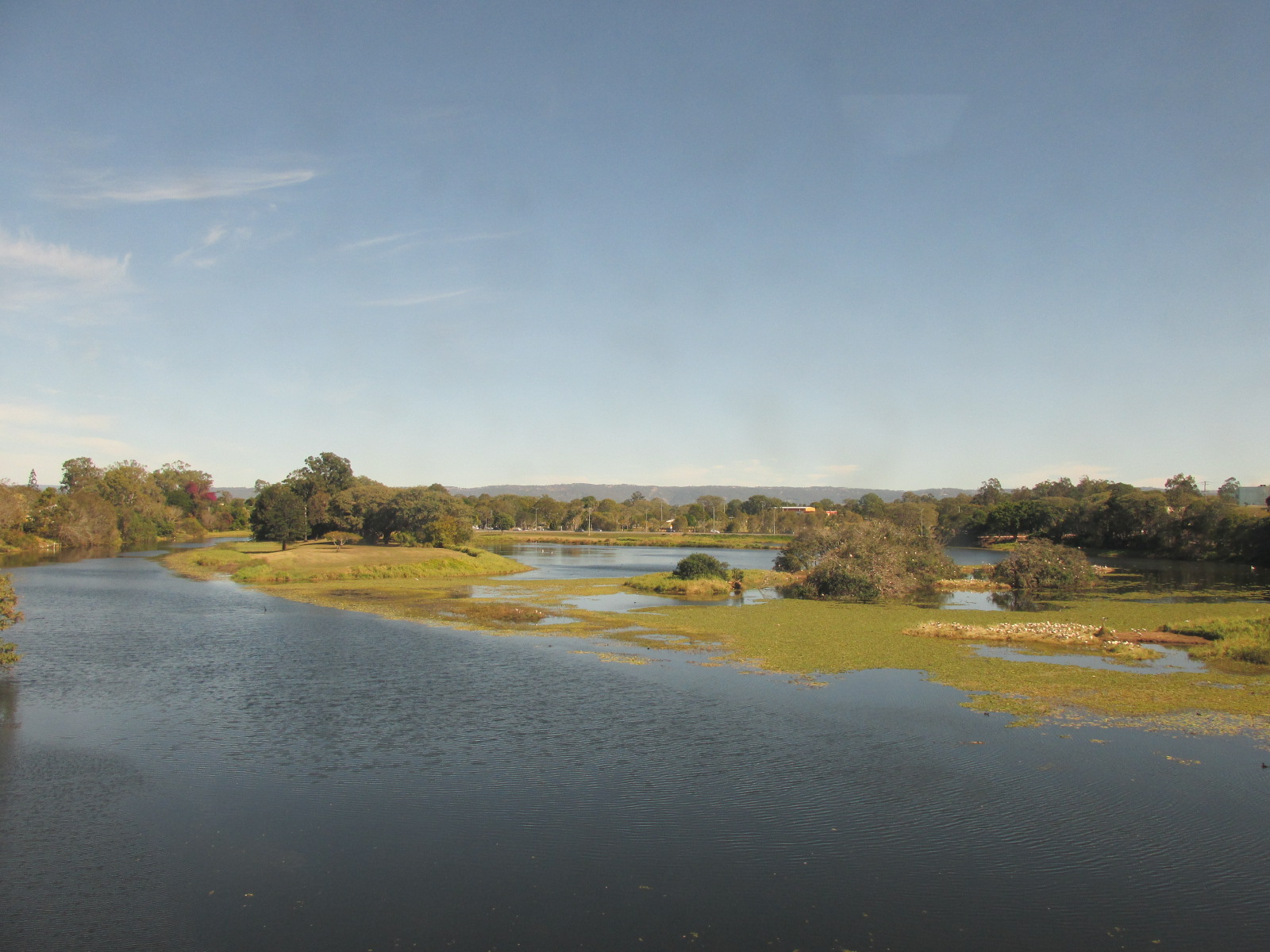
View from train crossing, 2014

Formed by runoff from the D'Aguilar Range, the Caboolture River rises below Campbells Pocket near Ocean View and flows generally east, joined by two minor tributaries and flowing through Rocksberg, Caboolture and Morayfield before entering Deception Bay, part of Moreton Bay, south of Beachmere. The river descends 262 metres (860 ft) over its 46-kilometre (29 mi) course.

The catchment area covers 468 square kilometres (181 sq mi). There are no dams on the waterway, except for a weir and the only major crossing is the Bruce Highway bridge. The Caboolture River is tidal for 19 kilometres (12 mi) upstream to the Caboolture Weir. At the river mouth a sand bar reduces the impact of tidal energy.

Increased urbanisation in the catchment is posing a significant environmental threat to the river, particularly land clearing which is fragmenting pockets of forest. In the upper reaches this has led to stormwater and sewerage runoff that has created significant nutrient and sediment loads. Except for mangrove forests near the river's mouth most of the riparian vegetation has been cleared. An upgrade at the Caboolture Sewerage Treatment plant has reduced some pollution impacts.

Upper parts of the catchment are protected with the D'Aguilar National Park. Lower parts of the river are within the Moreton Bay Marine Park.

Together with the Pine River and its tributaries, the Caboolture River is subject to episodes of flash flooding which can cause significant damage to public and private property throughout the catchment. Significant flood events with major flooding were reported in 1967, 1972, 1974, 1989, 1991, 2010, 2011, 2013 and 2015.

== History ==
The Kabi indigenous people are the traditional custodians of the Caboolture River catchment area. The name Kabultur is derived from the Yugarabul dialect meaning "place of the carpet snake". The Kabi people harvested bush food, fresh water mussels, oysters, fish, and some game animals, moving around the land to take best advantage of seasonally-available produce.

Because of the numerous shoals at its mouth the explorer John Oxley originally named the waterway the Deception River in 1823. The Caboolture River has been used to transport red cedar timber via raft from Mount Mee to Deception Bay.

== See also ==
- List of rivers of Australia § Queensland
