= Bruce Highway Western Alternative =

Proposed road in Queensland, Australia

Bruce Highway Western Alternative Queensland

General information
- Type: Highway (Proposed)

Major junctions
- South end: Not yet determined Kallangur
- D'Aguilar Highway
- North end: Not yet determined Beerburrum

Location(s)
- Major settlements: Narangba, Moorina, Moodlu

Highway system
- Highways in Australia; National Highway • Freeways in Australia; Highways in Queensland

Bruce Highway Western Alternative is a proposed highway from Kallangur to Beerburrum in Queensland, Australia. When completed it will reduce traffic on the Bruce Highway and provide a more convenient means of travel to north and south for residents of new developments in Upper Caboolture and surrounding areas.

== Funding and program status ==
As at July 2022 funding of $20 million has been allocated for the planning study. Planning is being progressed in four stages. The alignment for stage 1 has been confirmed, and planning for stage 2 is continuing.

== Stage 1 ==
The alignment for stage 1 runs 8.3 kilometres (5.2 mi) from Caboolture River Road in Moorina to the D'Aguilar Highway in Moodlu, following a fairly straight line along an existing power line easement. It passes through Upper Caboolture, crosses the Caboolture River, and then passes through Bellmere.

== Stage 2 ==
Stage 2 will run approximately 15 kilometres (9.3 mi) from Narangba to Moorina, with corridor options still being evaluated.

== Stages 3 and 4 ==
Stage 3 is from Bald Hills Interchange to Narangba, and stage 4 is from Moodlu to Sippy Downs Interchange .

== Development west of Caboolture ==
The land adjacent to stage 1 of the road is the site of a new regional city to be known as Caboolture West. It is planned that, over the next 40 years, it will grow to accommodate 30,000 new homes with a population of 70,000.
