= D'Aguilar Highway =

Highway in Queensland, Australia

D'Aguilar Highway Queensland
- D'Aguilar Highway (green on black)

General information
- Type: Highway
- Length: 164 km (102 mi)
- Route number(s): State Route 96; (Kingaroy – Nanango); A3; (Nanango – Yarraman); State Route A17; (Yarraman – Harlin); State Route 85; (Harlin – Caboolture)
- Former route number: National Route 17 (Nanango – Harlin)

Major junctions
- West end: Bunya Highway (State Route 49), Kingaroy
- Burnett Highway (State Highway A3); New England Highway (State Highway A3); Brisbane Valley Highway (State Route A17 / State Route 85); Kilcoy–Beerwah Road (State Route 6); Mount Mee Road (State Route 58); Beerburrum Road (State Route 60)
- East end: Bruce Highway (State Highway M1), Caboolture

Location(s)
- Major settlements: Nanango, Yarraman, Kilcoy, Woodford

Highway system
- Highways in Australia; National Highway • Freeways in Australia; Highways in Queensland

The D'Aguilar Highway is a two-lane highway linking the Bruce Highway near Caboolture with the Bunya Highway in Kingaroy in the state of Queensland, Australia. Major towns along the route include Woodford, Kilcoy, Blackbutt, Yarraman, and Nanango. The highway is approximately 164 km (102 mi) in length. The D'Aguilar Highway's highest elevation along its length is 527 m just north of Yarraman, and the lowest point is at 26.8 m just west of Caboolture.

== State-controlled road ==
D'Aguilar Highway is a state-controlled regional road, much of which is also rated as "state-strategic". It is defined in three sections, as follows:

- Number 40A, Caboolture to Kilcoy, regional.
- Number 40B, Kilcoy to Yarraman, regional and state-strategic.
- Number 40C, Yarraman to Kingaroy, regional and state-strategic.

== State Route 85 ==
The section of this highway between Caboolture and Harlin is part of State Route 85, which extends for over 570 km (354 mi) from Bribie Island to Nindigully, duplexing with the Brisbane Valley Highway (State Route A17) from Harlin to Esk, the New England Highway (State Route A3) from Hampton to Toowoomba, the Gore Highway (National Route A39) from Toowoomba to the Leichhardt Highway, and the southern 19 km (12 mi) section of the Leichhardt Highway (National Route A39/State Route A5) to Goondiwindi.

=== History ===
As of 13 December 2007, the D'Aguliar Highway bypasses Caboolture to the north.

In January 2009, the Department of Transport and Main Roads published details of the preferred design for a bypass of the Kilcoy township. The proposed route follows an abandoned rail corridor, and would have minimal impact on existing infrastructure. In 2021, significant changes were made to the two main intersections in Kilcoy to improve traffic flow. This seems to have been done as an alternative to the proposed bypass.

A project to provide wide centre lines near Wamuran, at a cost of $12 million, was completed in September 2022.

A project to provide safety improvements between Sandy Creek and Kilcoy, at a cost of $19 million, was completed in mid 2023.

== Major Intersections ==
Intersections are listed from west to east.

LGA	Location	km	mi	Destinations	Notes
South Burnett	Kingaroy	0	0.0	Bunya Highway (State Route 49) north – Wondai and Murgon / south – Bell and Dalby	Western end of D'Aguilar Highway. Continues to Nanango as State Route 96
South Burnett	Nanango	24.8	15.4	Burnett Highway (State Route A3) – Goomeri	D'Aguilar Highway continues to Yarraman as State Route A3
Toowoomba	Yarraman	45.7	28.4	New England Highway (State Route A3) – Cooyar	D'Aguilar Highway continues to Harlin as State Route A17
South Burnett	Blackbutt	59.9	37.2	Blackbutt–Crows Nest Road – Crows Nest	
Somerset	Moore	81.8	50.8	Linville Road – Linville	
Somerset	Harlin	90.9	56.5	Brisbane Valley Highway (State Route A17 / State Route 85) – Toogoolawah	D'Aguilar Highway continues to Caboolture as State Route 85
Brisbane River		91.3	56.7	Bridge (no known official name)	
Somerset	Kilcoy	114.4	71.1	Kilcoy–Murgon Road – Jimna	
Moreton Bay	Woodford	135.0	83.9	Kilcoy–Beerwah Road (State Route 6) – Beerwah	
Stanley River		135.8	84.4	Bridge (no known official name)	
Moreton Bay	D'Aguilar	142.7	88.7	Mount Mee Road (State Route 58) – Mount Mee	
Moreton Bay	Caboolture	161.6	100.4	Old Gympie Road north – Elimbah / Beerburrum Road (State Route 60) south – Caboolture CBD	
Moreton Bay	Caboolture	164.4	102.2	Bruce Highway (National Route M1) north – Sippy Downs / south – Burpengary	Eastern end of D'Aguilar Highway. Northern entry to Bruce Highway is approximately 1 km long. Southern entry to Bruce Highway is approximately 2 km long
1.000 mi = 1.609 km; 1.000 km = 0.621 mi: Route transition

== Intersecting state-controlled roads ==
The following state-controlled roads, from east to west, intersect with the D'Aguilar Highway:

- Beerburrum Road
- Caboolture Connection Road
- Brisbane–Woodford Road
- Kilcoy–Beerwah Road
- Kilcoy–Murgon Road
- Esk–Kilcoy Road
- Brisbane Valley Highway
- New England Highway
- Nanango–Tarong Road
- Burnett Highway
- Kingaroy–Cooyar Road
- Kingaroy–Barkers Creek Road

=== Caboolture Connection Road ===
Caboolture Connection Road
- Location: D'Aguilar Highway to Bruce Highway
- Length: 8.2 km (5.1 mi)

The Caboolture Connection Road (CCR) is a 8.2 km (5.1 mi) former section of the D'Aguilar Highway that runs south-east from the highway at Moodlu to the Bruce Highway in Caboolture, Queensland, Australia. It is a state-controlled regional road (number 9905) rated as a local road of regional significance (LRRS).

==== CCR Route description ====
The road commences at an intersection with the D'Aguilar Highway (State Route 85) in the locality of Moodlu. It starts as Williams Road and crosses the highway on an overbridge. It then runs south-east as King Street, passing the exit to Bellmere Road to the south-west, and continuing through Caboolture to an intersection with Burpengary–Caboolture Road and Beerburrum Road. It continues east as Lower King Street, crossing the railway line and reaching a bridge over the Bruce Highway, where it ends.

The physical road continues east as Caboolture–Bribie Island Road (State Route 85).

==== CCR History ====
With the opening of a new section of road in 2007 to enable the D'Aguilar Highway to bypass the Caboolture CBD, the bypassed section was renamed Caboolture Connection Road.

==== CCR Upgrade project ====
A project to upgrade signals and improve intersections on this road, at a cost of $7.5 million, was in construction in July 2022, with most sub-projects already completed.

==== CCR Major intersections ====
All distances are from Google Maps. The entire road is within the Moreton Bay local government area.

Location	km	mi	Destinations	Notes
Moodlu	0	0.0	D'Aguilar Highway – north–west – Wamuran – south–east – Bruce Highway, Caboolture	North–western end of Caboolture Connection Road. Eastbound traffic exits left from the highway and crosses it by an overbridge on Williams Road. Westbound traffic exits left from the highway onto King Street.
Moodlu	0.4	0.25	Williams Road – King Street intersection	T junction. Road continues south-east as King Street.
Caboolture	3.9	2.4	Bellmere Road – south–west – Bellmere	Road continues south–east.
Caboolture	5.7	3.5	Burpengary–Caboolture Road (Morayfield Road) (State Route 60) – south – Morayfield; Beerburrum Road (State Route 60) – north – Beerburrum	Road continues east as Lower King Street.
Caboolture	8.2	5.1	Bruce Highway – north – Elimbah – south – Morayfield.	Eastern end of Caboolture Connection Road. Road continues east as Caboolture–Bribie Island Road (State Route 85)
1.000 mi = 1.609 km; 1.000 km = 0.621 mi

=== Esk–Kilcoy Road ===
Esk–Kilcoy Road
- Location: Brisbane Valley Highway, Esk to D'Aguilar Highway, Woolmar
- Length: 46.8 km (29.1 mi)

Esk–Kilcoy Road is a state-controlled district road (number 405) rated as a local road of regional significance (LRRS). It runs from the Brisbane Valley Highway in Esk to the D'Aguilar Highway in Woolmar, a distance of 46.8 kilometres (29.1 mi). It intersects with Wivenhoe–Somerset Road in Somerset.

=== Kingaroy–Barkers Creek Road ===
Kingaroy–Barkers Creek Road
- Location: D'Aguilar Highway, Kingaroy to Burnett Highway, Sandy Ridges
- Length: 22.3 km (13.9 mi)

Kingaroy–Barkers Creek Road is a state-controlled district road (number 4202)) rated as a local road of regional significance (LRRS). It runs from the D'Aguilar Highway in Kingaroy to the Burnett Highway in Sandy Ridges, a distance of 22.3 kilometres (13.9 mi). It has no intersections with other state-controlled roads.

== Gallery ==
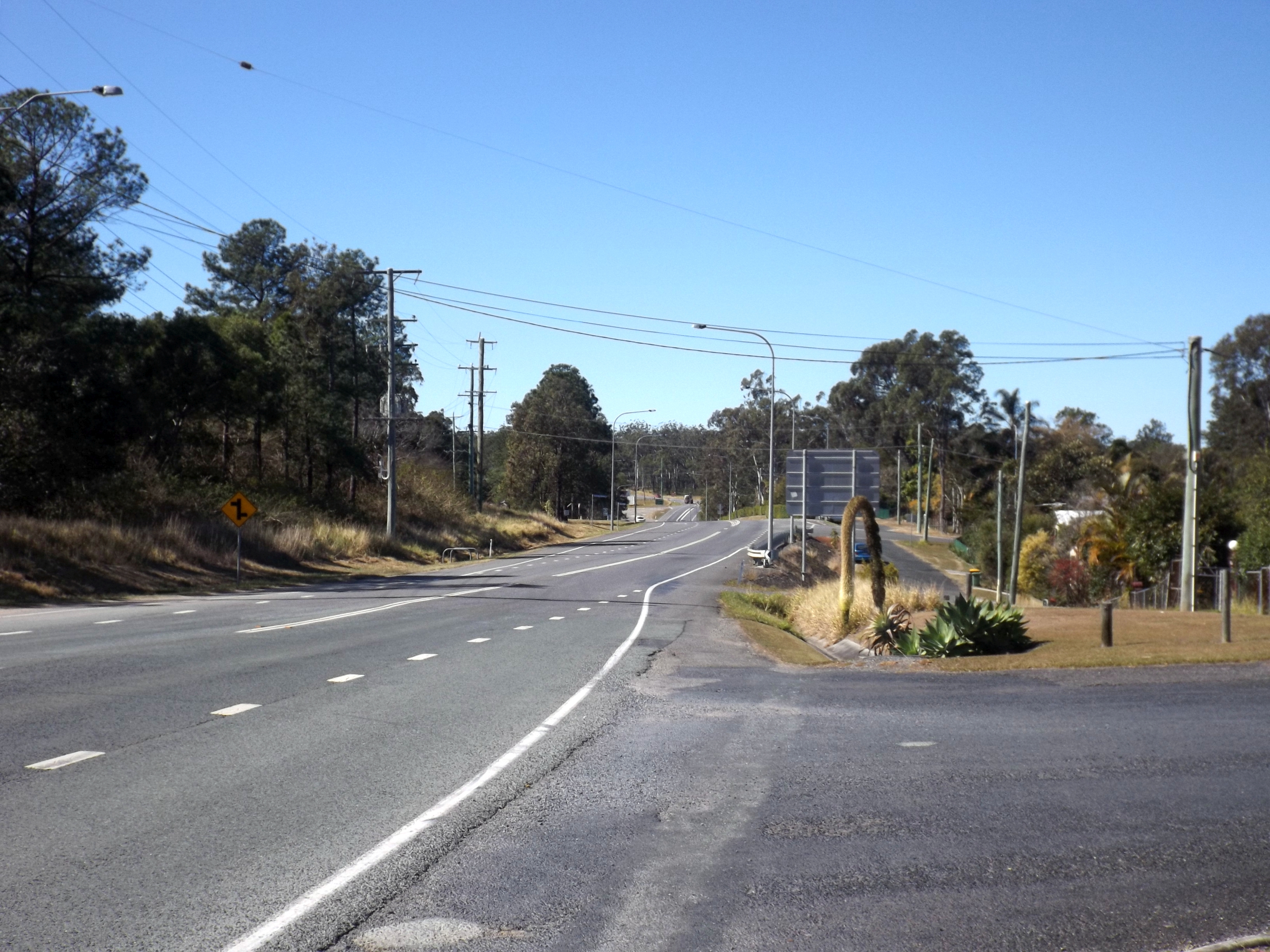
Highway at D'Aguilar, 2015

== See also ==
- Highways in Australia
- List of highways in Queensland
- Bridges over the Brisbane River
- List of highways numbered 85
