= Beerburrum Road =

Road in Queensland, Australia

Beerburrum Road Queensland

General information
- Type: Road
- Length: 15.2 km (9.4 mi)
- Route number(s): (Caboolture – Beerburrum)

Major junctions
- South end: Caboolture Connection Road, Caboolture
- Pumicestone Road; Old Gympie Road; Beerburrum-Woodford Road
- North end: Glass House Mountains Road (Steve Irwin Way), Beerburrum

Location(s)
- Major suburbs: Elimbah

Beerburrum Road is a continuous 15.2-kilometre (9.4 mi) road route in the Moreton Bay and Sunshine Coast local government areas of Queensland, Australia. It is designated as part of State Route 60. It is a state-controlled district road (number 127), rated as a local road of regional significance (LRRS).

== Route description ==
Beerburrum Road commences as State Route 60 at an intersection with the Caboolture Connection Road in Caboolture. It runs north, passing Pumicestone Road (see below) to the north-east and Old Gympie Road to the north-west. It leaves Caboolture and passes through Elimbah before entering Beerburrum, where it turns north-east, passes the exit to Beerburrum–Woodford Road to the west, and crosses the North Coast railway line. It continues to the north and then east as it reaches the Glass House Mountains Road (Steve Irwin Way) where it ends.

Land use along the road is mainly rural.

== Road condition ==
The road is fully sealed, and most of it is two lane road.

=== Upgrade projects ===
A lead project to improve safety on sections of this road and Burpengary–Caboolture Road, at a cost of $28.8 million, was under construction in July 2022, with two sub-projects on this road already completed.

- * Between Esme Avenue and McKean Street intersections. (Completed October 2021)
- * Intersection with Industry Drive and Old Gympie Road. (Completed)

== History ==
The Caboolture area was colonised by European people in 1842 when the land around the Moreton Bay penal colony was opened up to free settlers. By the mid-1860s farms had been established and the local pastoralists were experimenting with sugar cane and cotton.

Elimbah was first settled by Europeans as a resting place on the road to Gympie for horses and bullocks, known as The Six Mile. In 1890 it became a railway siding known by its position on the line rather than a name, and in 1902 it was officially named Elimbah.

Some European settlement in what is now the locality of Beerburrum had occurred from 1861, but it was not until 1890 when the railway arrived that the area became accessible for new settlers. In 1916, Beerburrum was chosen to be a soldier settlement with over 550 farms allocated. Beerburrum Soldier Settlement was the largest soldier settlement in Queensland.

This road was part of the Bruce Highway when it was declared in 1934, and remained so until August 1970, when the Caboolture Bypass Stage 2 was completed between Bribie Island Road and Red Road.

== Pumicestone Road ==
Pumicestone Road
- Location: Beerburrum Road, Caboolture to Freeman Road, Toorbul
- Length: 18.5 km (11.5 mi)

Pumicestone Road is a state-controlled district road (number 1204) rated as a local road of regional significance (LRRS). It runs from Beerburrum Road in Caboolture to Freeman Road in Toorbul, a distance of 18.5 kilometres (11.5 mi), crossing the Bruce Highway by an overbridge. This road intersects with the D'Aguilar Highway in Caboolture, the Bruce Highway on the Caboolture / Elimbah boundary, and Donnybrook Road in Toorbul.

== Major intersections ==
All distances are from Google Maps. The road is within the Moreton Bay and Sunshine Coast local government areas.

LGA	Location	km	mi	Destinations	Notes
Moreton Bay	Caboolture	0	0.0	Caboolture Connection Road – west – Moodlu – east – Bruce Highway, Caboolture	Southern end of Beerburrum Road (State Route 60); Road continues south as Burpengary–Caboolture Road (Morayfield Road).
Moreton Bay	Caboolture	1.5	0.93	Pumicestone Road – northeast – Toorbul	Road continues north.
Moreton Bay	Caboolture	1.6	0.99	Old Gympie Road – northwest – Elimbah	Road continues north.
Sunshine Coast	Beerburrum	14.2	8.8	Beerburrum–Woodford Road – west – Woodford	Road continues northeast.
Sunshine Coast	Beerburrum	15.2	9.4	Glass House Mountains Road (Steve Irwin Way) – north – Glass House Mountains – south – Bruce Highway, Elimbah.	Northern end of Beerburrum Road.
1.000 mi = 1.609 km; 1.000 km = 0.621 mi

== See also ==
- List of road routes in Queensland
- List of numbered roads in Queensland
