= Steve Irwin Way =

Road in Queensland, Australia

Steve Irwin Way Queensland

General information
- Type: Road
- Length: 30.4 km (19 mi)
- Route number(s): No shield (Elimbah – Beerwah); (Beerwah – Glenview)

Major junctions
- South end: Bruce Highway, Elimbah
- Beerburrum Road; Kilcoy-Beerwah Road; Landsborough–Maleny Road
- North end: Bruce Highway, Glenview

Location(s)
- Major suburbs: Beerburrum, Glass House Mountains, Beerwah, Landsborough

Steve Irwin Way, formerly Glass House Mountains Road, is a continuous 30.4-kilometre (18.9 mi) road route in the Moreton Bay and Sunshine Coast local government areas of Queensland, Australia. Part of it is designated as part of State Route 6. It is a state-controlled road (number 490), part regional and part district.

== Route description ==
Steve Irwin Way (Glass House Mountains Road) commences with no route number at an intersection with the Bruce Highway in Elimbah. It runs north-west into the locality of Beerburrum and then turns north, passing Beerburrum Road to the west. It leaves Beerburrum and passes through Glass House Mountains before entering Beerwah, where it passes the exits to Kilcoy-Beerwah Road to the west and Roys Road to the east. Here it becomes State Route 6 and Tourist Drive 24, and continues to the north, passing Australia Zoo, and then north-east as it reaches Landsborough. It passes the exit to Landsborough–Maleny Road (Tourist Drive 23) to the north-west and continues in a north-easterly direction, passing the exit to Mooloolah Connection Road to the north, until it reaches the Bruce Highway at Glenview, where it ends. The physical road continues east as Caloundra Road (State Route 6).

Land use along the road is mainly rural.

== Road condition ==
The road is fully sealed, and most of it is two-lane road, with some isolated four-lane segments.

=== Upgrade project ===
A project to improve safety between Beerwah and Landsborough, at a cost of $24 million, was under construction in July 2022.

=== Related Bruce Highway projects ===
The intersection with the Bruce Highway at Elimbah is being upgraded in 2022 in conjunction with a project to expand the highway to six lanes at that point.

The intersection with the Bruce Highway at Glenview was upgraded in 2021 as part of a project to expand the highway to six lanes at that point and to improve traffic flow through the intersection.

== History ==
Elimbah was first settled by Europeans as a resting place on the road to Gympie for horses and bullocks, known as The Six Mile. In 1890, it became a railway siding known by its position on the line rather than a name, and in 1902 it was officially named Elimbah.

Some European settlement in what is now the locality of Beerburrum had occurred from 1861, but it was not until 1890 when the railway arrived that the area became accessible for new settlers. In 1916, Beerburrum was chosen to be a soldier settlement with over 550 farms allocated. Beerburrum Soldier Settlement was the largest soldier settlement in Queensland.

A coach stop on the road to the Gympie goldfields was established in what is now Glass House Mountains in 1868.

European settlement at Beerwah began in 1877, with timber cutting and land clearing, followed by fruit growing and other forms of agriculture.

In 1871 a coach stop was established at Mellum Creek, the site of the town of Landsborough, which was so named with the arrival of the North Coast railway line in 1890.

Most of this road was part of the Bruce Highway when it was declared in 1934, and remained so until 1985, when the new alignment reached Caloundra Road at Glenview.

Shortly after the death of conservationist Steve Irwin in September 2006, the Queensland Government renamed Glass House Mountains Road to Steve Irwin Way. The road runs along the front of the Irwin family's Australia Zoo.

In 2025, a one kilometre section of the road between Beerburrum and Glasshouse Mountains was rerouted to make way for a realignment of the North Coast railway line.

== Major intersections ==
All distances are from Google Maps. The road is within the Moreton Bay and Sunshine Coast local government areas.

LGA	Location	km	mi	Destinations	Notes
Moreton Bay	Elimbah	0	0.0	Bruce Highway – north – Beerburrum – south – Caboolture	Southern end of Glass House Mountains Road (Steve Irwin Way)
Sunshine Coast	Beerburrum	4.8	3.0	Beerburrum Road – west, then south – Caboolture	Road continues north.
Sunshine Coast	Beerwah	15.2	9.4	Kilcoy–Beerwah Road – west – Kilcoy; Roys Road – east – Bruce Highway	Road continues north as State Route 6 and Tourist Drive 24
Sunshine Coast	Landsborough	21.1	13.1	Maleny–Landsborough Road – north-west – Maleny	Road continues north-east
Sunshine Coast	Glenview	27.5	17.1	Mooloolah Connection Road – north – Mooloolah Valley	Road continues east
Sunshine Coast	Glenview	30.4	18.9	Bruce Highway – north – Nambour – south – Caboolture	Northern end of Glass House Mountains Road (Steve Irwin Way), Road continues east over Bruce Highway as Caloundra Road (State Route 6)
1.000 mi = 1.609 km; 1.000 km = 0.621 mi: Route transition

== Intersecting state-controlled road ==
The following state-controlled road, not described elsewhere, intersects with this road.

=== Mooloolah Connection Road ===
Mooloolah Connection Road
- Location: Glass House Mountains Road, Glenview to Palmwoods–Mooloolah Road, Mooloolah Valley
- Length: 6.8 km (4.2 mi)

Mooloolah Connection Road is a state-controlled district road (number 4906) rated as a local road of regional significance (LRRS). It runs from Glass House Mountains Road in Glenview to Palmwoods-Mooloolah Road in Mooloolah Valley, a distance of 6.8 kilometres (4.2 mi).
