= Isis River Bridge =

- Coordinates: 25°15′54″S 152°22′26″E
- Carries: Motor vehicles
- Crosses: Isis River
- Locale: south of Childers, Queensland, Australia
- Maintained by: Department of Transport and Main Roads

Characteristics
- Design: Beam bridge
- Material: Concrete

History
- Constructed by: Seymour Whyte
- Construction start: October 2010
- Opened: 12 August 2011
- Replaces: 1956-2011 bridge

Statistics
- Daily traffic: 7200

Location
- Interactive map of Isis River Bridge

The Isis River Bridge is a road bridge over the Isis River south of Childers, Queensland, Australia.

The bridge was built on a new and improved alignment of the Bruce Highway. It replaced the 54-year-old bridge which was prone to flooding. The new bridge will improve flood immunity as it is almost seven metres higher than the old bridge.

The new bridge, constructed by Seymour Whyte, opened to traffic on 12 August 2011. The old bridge was demolished on completion of the project in late September 2011.

The project was jointly funded by the Australian and Queensland Governments.
