= Elimbah, Queensland =

Elimbah
- Town
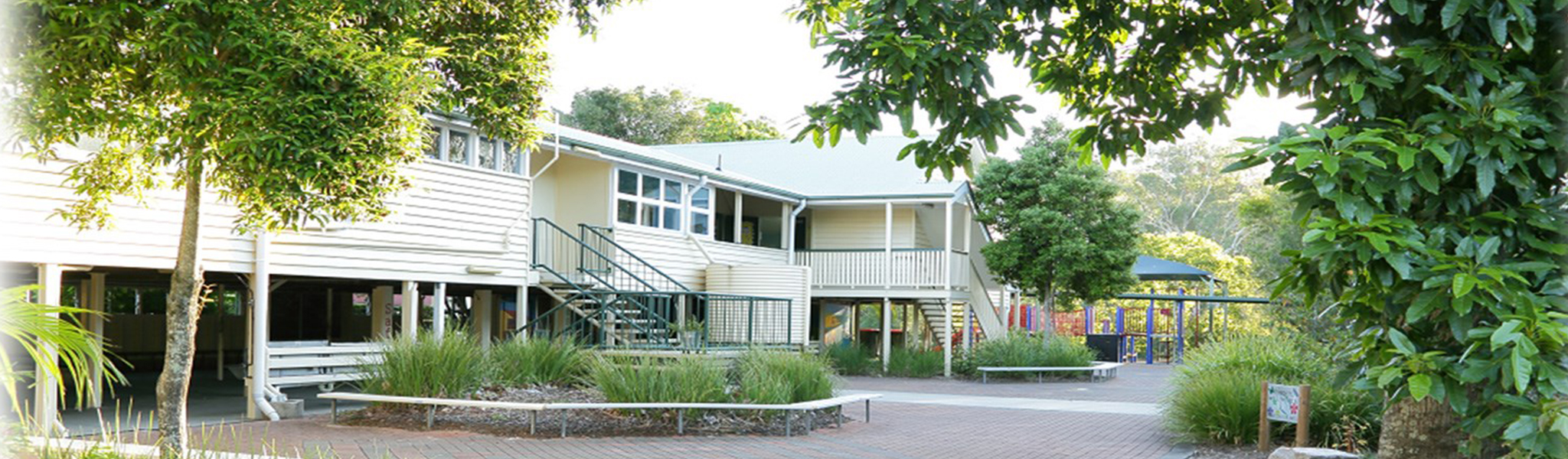
- Elimbah State School, 2021

- Interactive map of Elimbah
- Coordinates: 27.0125°S 152.9436°E
- Country: Australia
- State: Queensland
- LGA: City of Moreton Bay
- Location: 8.2 km (5.1 mi) NNE of Caboolture; 58.1 km (36.1 mi) N of Brisbane CBD

Government
  - State electorates: Pumicestone; Glass House
  - Federal divisions: Fisher; Longman

Area
  - Total: 100.1 km^{2} (38.6 sq mi)

Population
  - Total: 4,290 (2021 census)
  - Density: 42.86/km^{2} (111.00/sq mi)
- Time zone: UTC+10:00 (AEST)
- Postcode: 4516
Localities around Elimbah
| Woodford | Beerburrum | Beerburrum |
| Wamuran | Elimbah | Donnybrook |
| Wamuran | Caboolture | Toorbul |

Elimbah is a rural town and locality in the City of Moreton Bay, Queensland, Australia. In the 2021 census, the locality of Elimbah had a population of 4,290 people.

== Geography ==
Elimbah is located north of the larger centre of Caboolture, and south of Beerburrum.

Elimbah has the following mountains:

- Round Mountain (27.0296°S 152.9324°E) 97 metres (318 ft)
- The Saddleback (27.0136°S 152.9273°E) 125 metres (410 ft)
- Tunbubudla (The Twins) (26.9632°S 152.9014°E) 296 metres (971 ft)

The Bruce Highway passes from south to north through the locality. Further west, Beerburrum Road also runs through from south to north. Steve Irwin Way passes through the north-east corner. The North Coast railway line also passes from south to north through the locality, roughly parallel to the highway. The town is served by Elimbah railway station (27.0110°S 152.9459°E).

== History ==
The traditional owners of Elimbah were the Kabi people, who called the area as the "place of the grey water snake".

The town was originally a campsite known as The Six Mile when it became a resting place for horses and bullocks. In 1890, with the breakthrough of the North Coast railway line, it became known as "36miles 68chains". On 20 September 1902, at the urging of local residents, it was officially named Elimbah.

Elimbah State School opened on 3 November 1915. The school was officially opened on Australia Day in 1916.

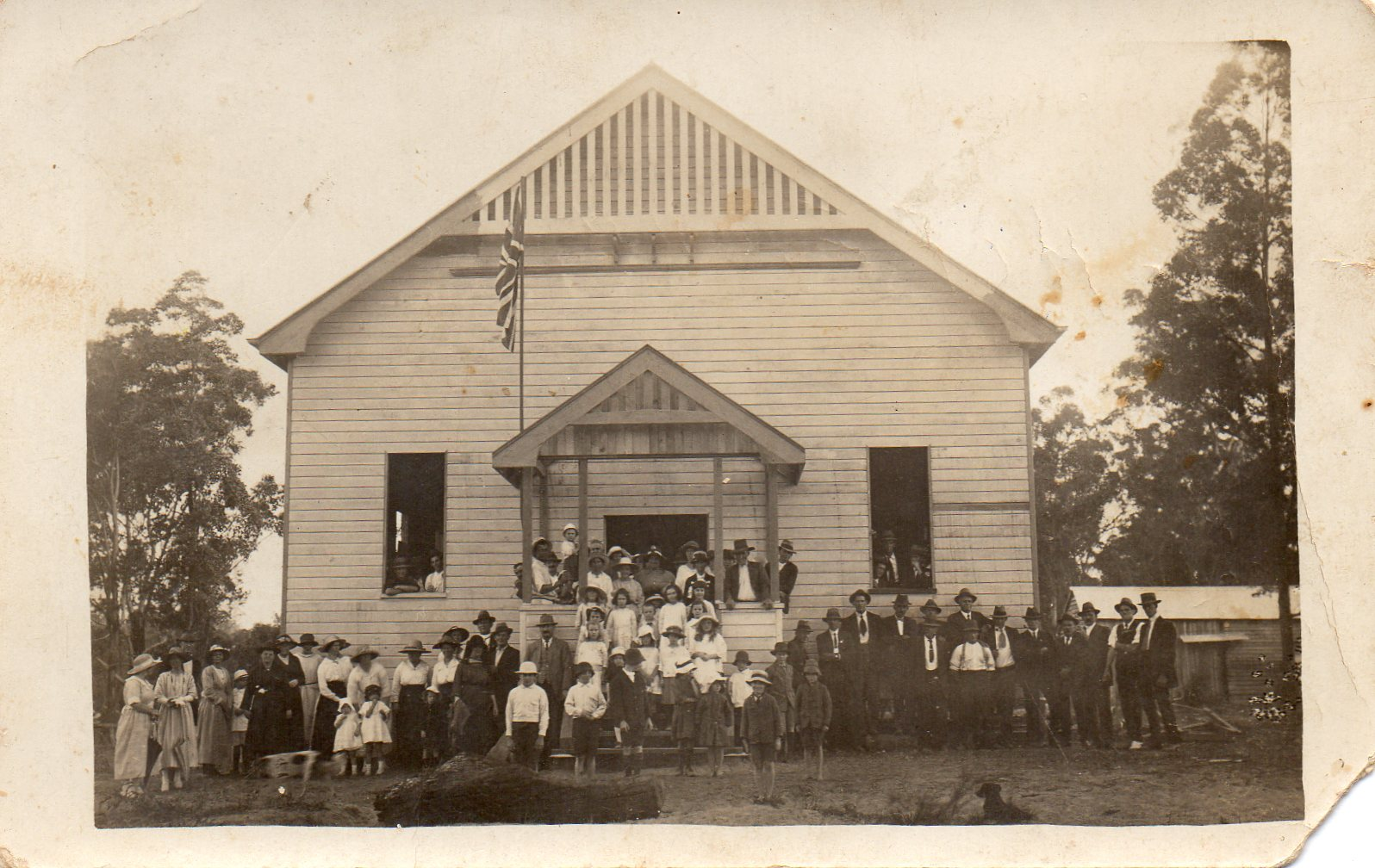
Dedication of Elimbah Soldiers Memorial Hall, 1922

Fundraising for Elimbah Hall began in 1915 and dedicated to returned servicemen on ANZAC Day, 25 April 1922.

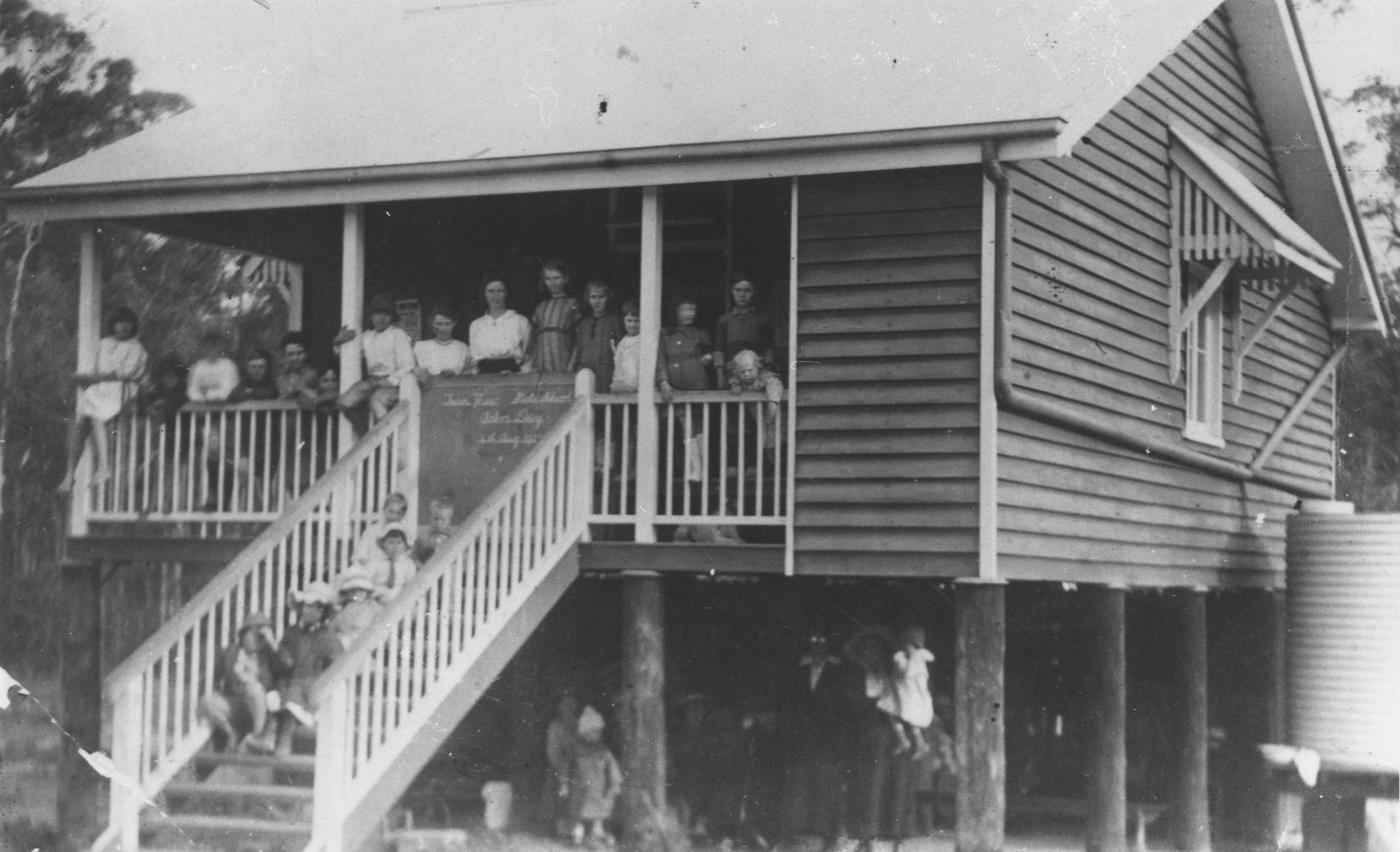
Staff and students at Twin View State School, circa 1921

Twin View State School opened on 4 January 1921 and closed in October 1924. The building was then relocated to Wamuran to be the new school building for Wamuran State School.

The Methodist Church purchased 3 blocks of land in Elimbah in 1913. In 1953, a church was being constructed, with Elimbah Methodist Church opening in 1954. With the amalgamation of the Methodist Church into the Uniting Church in Australia in 1977, it became Elimbah Uniting Church.

== Demographics ==
In the 2016 census, Elimbah recorded a population of 3,963 people, 48.7% female and 51.3% male. The median age of the Elimbah population was 39 years, two years older than the national median. Aboriginal and Torres Strait Islander people made up 3.2% of the population. 80.7% of people were born in Australia. The next most common countries of birth were England 3.9% and New Zealand 3.7%. 90.1% of people spoke only English at home. The most common responses for religion were No Religion 30.6%, Catholic 21.5% and Anglican 17.3%.In the 2016 census, the locality of Elimbah had a population of 3,963 people.

In the 2021 census, the locality of Elimbah had a population of 4,290 people.

== Education ==
Elimbah State School is a government primary (Prep–6) school for boys and girls at School Road (27.0127°S 152.9424°E). It includes a special education program. In 2018, the school had an enrolment of 437 students with 35 teachers (30 full-time equivalent) and 22 non-teaching staff (14 full-time equivalent).

There is no secondary school in Elimbah. The nearest government secondary schools are Caboolture State High School and Tullawong State High School, both in neighbouring Caboolture to the south.

== Amenities ==
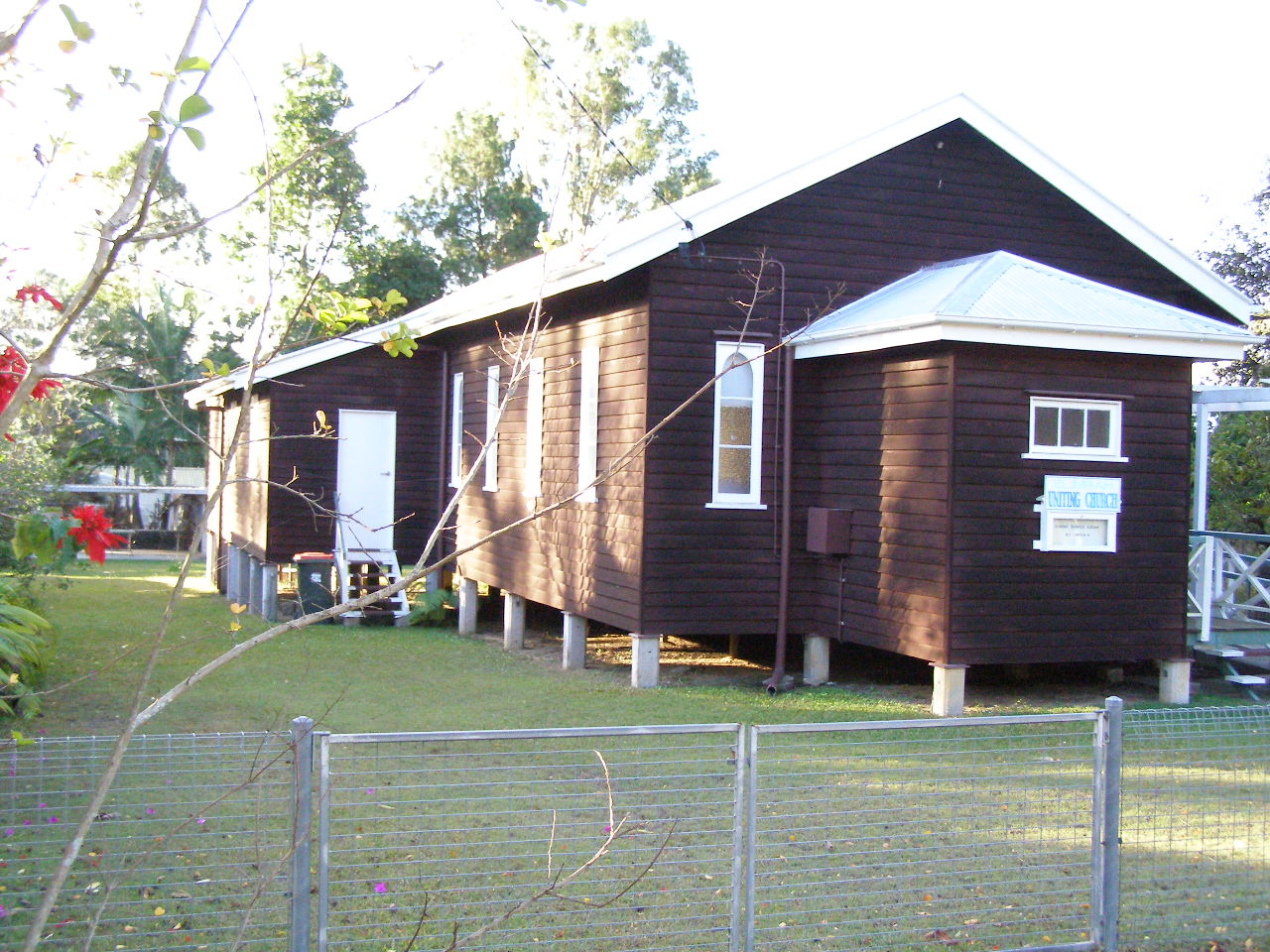
Elimbah Uniting Church, 2006

Elimbah Soldiers Memorial Hall is at 10a Coronation Drive.

Elimbah Uniting Church is at 3 Coronation Drive (27.0124°S 152.9442°E). It is part of the Moreton Rivers Presbytery of the Uniting Church in Australia.

St Mary Magdalene Orthodox Christian Mission is part of the Antiochian Orthodox Christian Archdiocese of Australia, New Zealand and the Philippines. It meets in the Uniting Church.
