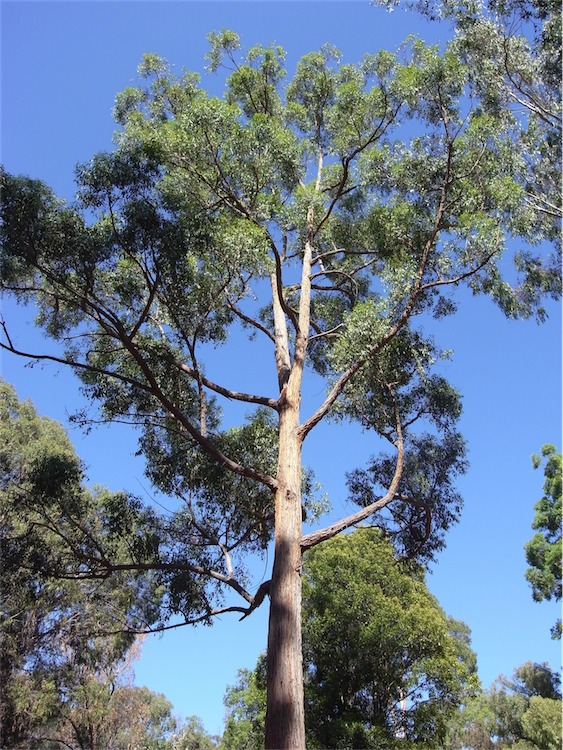
- Eucalyptus tindaliae in the ANBG

Scientific classification
- Kingdom: Plantae
- Clade: Embryophytes
- Clade: Tracheophytes
- Clade: Spermatophytes
- Clade: Angiosperms
- Clade: Eudicots
- Clade: Rosids
- Order: Myrtales
- Family: Myrtaceae
- Genus: Eucalyptus
- Species: E. tindaliae

Binomial name
- Eucalyptus tindaliae Blakely

Synonyms
- Eucalyptus curta Brooker nom. inval., nom. nud.; Eucalyptus phaeotricha Blakely & McKie; Eucalyptus reducta L.A.S.Johnson & K.D.Hill; Eucalyptus tindalae Blakely orth. var.

= Eucalyptus tindaliae =

Tindal's stringybark

Species of eucalyptus

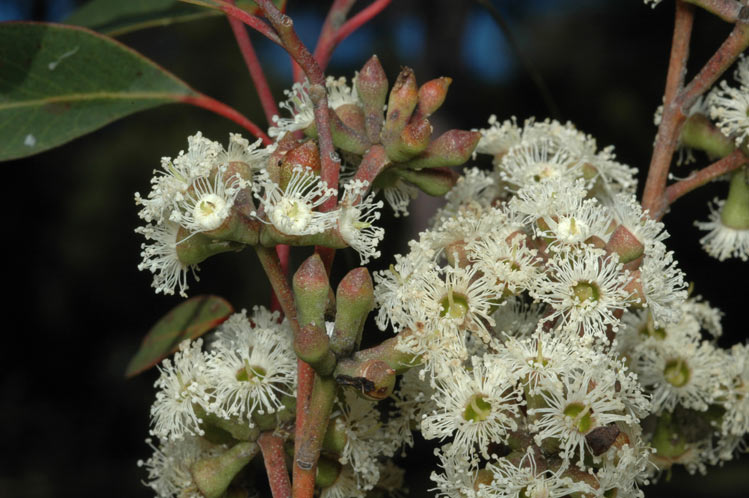
Flower buds and flowers

Eucalyptus tindaliae, commonly known as Tindal's stringybark, is a species of tree that is endemic to coastal eastern Australia. It has rough, stringy bark on the trunk and larger branches, lance-shaped to curved adult leaves, flower buds in groups of between nine and fifteen, white flowers and hemispherical fruit.

== Description ==
Eucalyptus tindaliae is a tree that typically grows to a height of 27–30 m (89–98 ft) and forms a lignotuber. It has rough, stringy grey bark on the trunk and larger branches. Young plants and coppice regrowth have glossy green leaves that are paler on the lower surface, egg-shaped to lance-shaped, 30–95 mm (1.2–3.7 in) long and 14–45 mm (0.55–1.77 in) wide. Adult leaves are more or less the same shade of green on both sides, lance-shaped to curved, 60–140 mm (2.4–5.5 in) long and 12–37 mm (0.47–1.46 in) wide, tapering to a petiole 6–20 mm (0.24–0.79 in) long. The flower buds are arranged in leaf axils in groups of between nine and fifteen on an unbranched peduncle 5–18 mm (0.20–0.71 in) long, the individual buds sessile or on pedicels up to 2 mm (0.079 in) long. Mature buds are oval, 3–7 mm (0.12–0.28 in) long and 3–4 mm (0.12–0.16 in) wide with a conical to rounded operculum. Flowering occurs from May to August in the north of its range and from January to March in the south. The flowers are white and the fruit is a woody hemispherical capsule 3–7 mm (0.12–0.28 in) long and 6–10 mm (0.24–0.39 in) wide with the valves at or below rim level.

== Taxonomy and naming ==
Eucalyptus tindaliae was first formally described in 1929 by Joseph Maiden in his book A Critical Revision of the Genus Eucalyptus. The specific epithet (tindaliae) honours Anne Grant Tindal (1859–1928), a member of a farming family from northern New South Wales.

== Distribution and habitat ==
Tindal's stringybark grows on heavy soils in closed forest in near-coastal areas between the Atherton Tableland and Coffs Harbour.
