= Bruce Highway =

Highway in Queensland, Australia

Bruce Highway Queensland
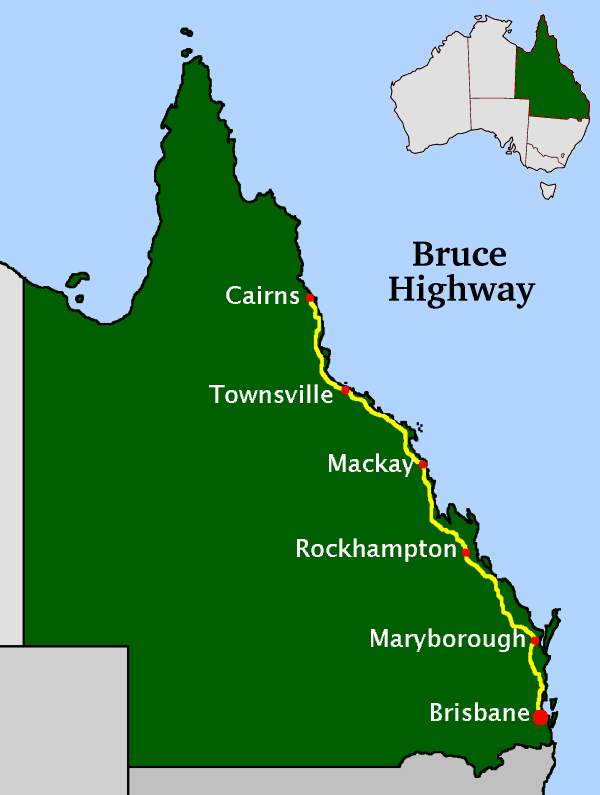
- Map of Queensland with Bruce Highway highlighted in yellow

General information
- Type: Highway
- Length: 1,679 km (1,043 mi)
- Route number(s): M1 (Bald Hills – Curra); A1 (Curra – Cairns (except Douglas – Deeragun))

Major junctions
- North end: Captain Cook Highway (National Route 1 / State Route 44), Cairns, Queensland
- Palmerston Highway (State Route 25); Flinders Highway (A6); Peak Downs Highway (State Route 70); Capricorn Highway (A4); Burnett Highway (A3); Dawson Highway (State Route 60); Isis Highway (State Route 52); Wide Bay Highway (State Route 49); Sunshine Motorway (State Route 70); D'Aguilar Highway (State Route 85); Gympie Arterial Road (M3)
- South end: Gateway Motorway (M1), Bald Hills, Brisbane

Location(s)
- Major settlements: Townsville, Mackay, Rockhampton, Maryborough, Gympie

Highway system
- Highways in Australia; National Highway • Freeways in Australia; Highways in Queensland

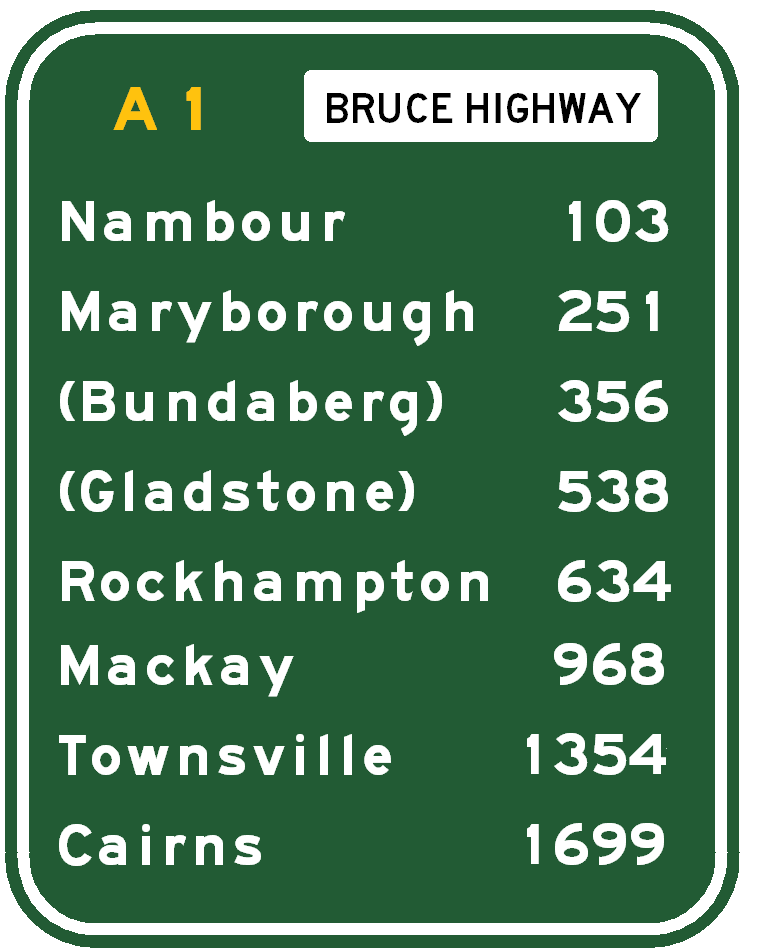
Approximate road distances (in kilometres) of towns from Brisbane along the highway

The Bruce Highway is a major highway in Queensland, Australia. Commencing in the state capital, Brisbane, it passes through areas close to the eastern coast on its way to Cairns in Far North Queensland. The route is part of the Australian National Highway and also part of Highway 1, the longest highway route in Australia. Its length is approximately 1,679 kilometres (1,043 mi); it is entirely sealed with bitumen. The highway is named after a popular former Queensland and federal politician, Harry Bruce. Bruce was the state Minister for Works in the mid-1930s when the highway was named after him. The highway once passed through Brisbane, but was truncated at Bald Hills when the Gateway Motorway became National Highway 1 upon its opening in December 1986.

It was previously known as the Great North Coast Road, being renamed as the Bruce Highway in 1934 after the state's Minister for Public Works, Harry Bruce.

The highway is the biggest traffic carrier in Queensland. It initially joined all the major coastal centres; however, a number of bypasses, particularly in the south, have diverted traffic around these cities to expedite traffic flow and ease urban congestion. As a result, the highway is constantly being shortened. The road is a dual carriageway from Brisbane to Curra, north of Gympie, many of these upgrades being completed in the 1980s (Glass House Mountains, Tanawha, Maryborough) and 1990s (Nambour, Yandina, and Cooroy).

The highway commences just south of the bridge over the Pine River at the Gateway Motorway interchange, 21 kilometres (13 mi) north of the Brisbane central business district. The highway has changed its route numbering from National Highway 1 to the M1 (motorway road) or A1 (single carriageway, generally with overtaking lanes).

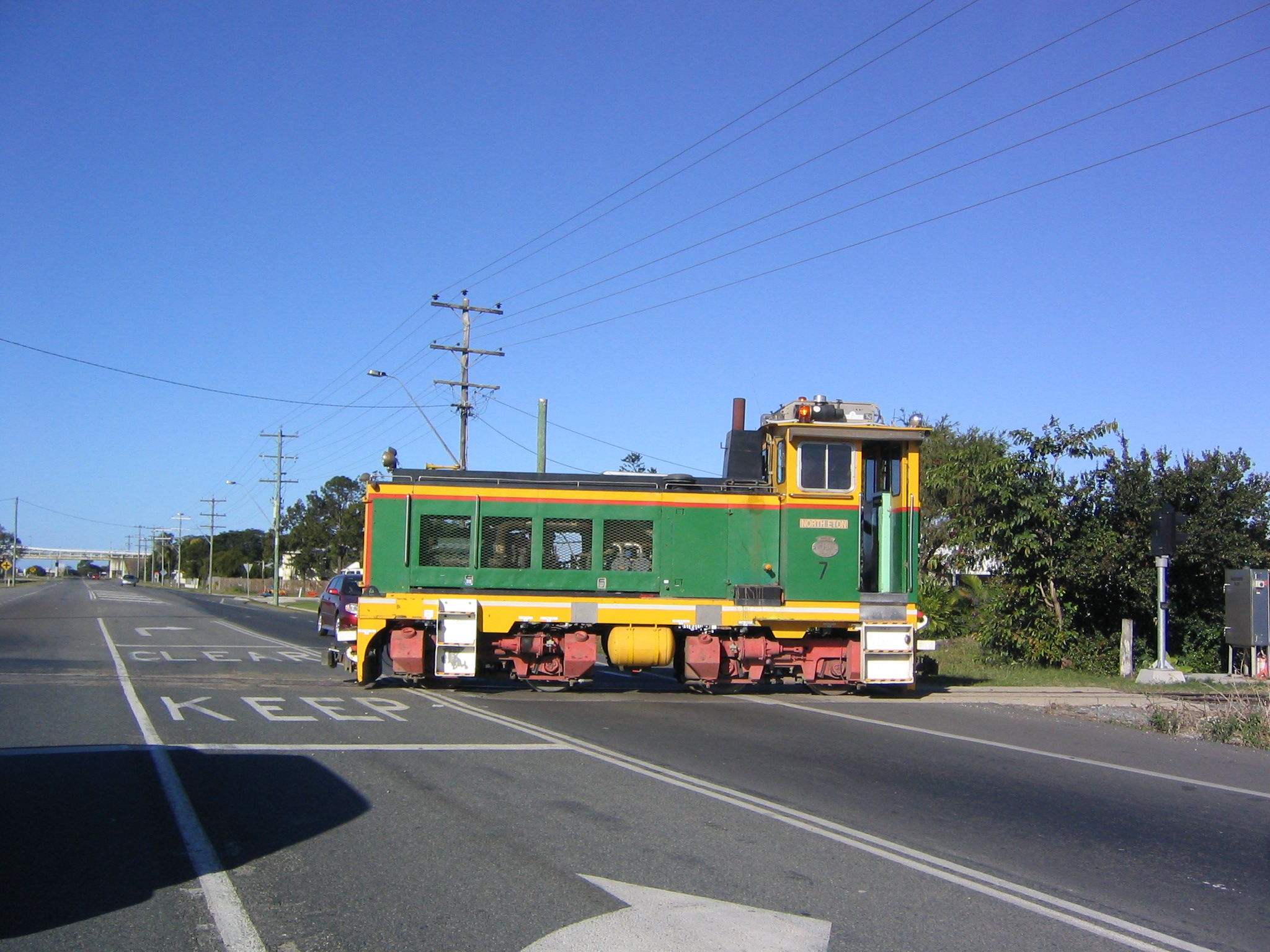
Sugar cane train crossing, 2003

Major cities along the route include Gympie, Maryborough, Rockhampton, Mackay, Townsville, and Cairns. The highway passes the Glasshouse Mountains, rainforests and pastures in the Sunshine Coast, the Gunalda Range (north of Gympie), Mount Larcom (north of Gladstone), and the arid countryside north of Rockhampton; after that, it passes through land predominantly used for sugar cane, crop growing and dairy farms and the sub-tropics and tropics.

In November 2024, the Bruce Highway Advisory Council was re-established.

== State-controlled road ==
The Bruce Highway is a state-controlled road, subdivided into fourteen sections for administrative and funding purposes. All sections are part of the National Highway.

The sections are:

- 10A – Brisbane to Gympie
- 10B – Gympie to Maryborough
- 10C – Maryborough to Gin Gin
- 10D – Gin Gin to Benaraby
- 10E – Benaraby to Rockhampton
- 10F – Rockhampton to St Lawrence
- 10G – St Lawrence to Mackay
- 10H – Mackay to Proserpine
- 10J – Proserpine to Bowen
- 10K – Bowen to Ayr
- 10L – Ayr to Townsville
- 10M – Townsville to Ingham
- 10N – Ingham to Innisfail
- 10P – Innisfail to Cairns

State-controlled roads that intersect with the highway are listed in the main article.

== Route description ==
Commencing in Bald Hills at the junction of the Gateway Motorway and Gympie Arterial Road, the Bruce Highway is a motorway standard road (signed as the M1) for its first 163 kilometres (101 mi) to Curra, where it becomes a two-lane sealed highway for most of its remainder. The first 2.5 kilometres (1.6 mi) to the Dohles Rocks Road interchange has eight lanes and a variable (electronically signed) speed limit of up to 100 kilometres per hour (60 mph). The next 22 kilometres (14 mi) to the Caboolture / Bribie Island interchange has six lanes and a maximum speed limit of 100 kilometres per hour (60 mph). From there to Curra the road has four lanes and a speed limit of 110 kilometres per hour (70 mph).

=== Brisbane to Rockhampton ===
==== Bald Hills to Caboolture ====
This section of the Bruce Highway crosses the Pine River into the City of Moreton Bay, passing through mainly urban areas before crossing the Caboolture River and reaching the Caboolture / Bribie Island interchange after 24.5 kilometres (15.2 mi). It runs past or through Murrumba Downs, Griffin, Kallangur, Mango Hill, North Lakes, Dakabin, Narangba, Burpengary and Morayfield. On the way it is crossed by the Redcliffe Peninsula railway line and passes the Caboolture BP Travel Centre.

==== Caboolture to Caloundra ====
The Caboolture / Bribie Island interchange also provides access to the D'Aguilar Highway via a service road. After the D'Aguilar Highway interchange the Bruce passes through mainly rural areas and the Beerburrum and Beerwah State Forests, entering the Sunshine Coast Region before reaching the Caloundra Road interchange after a further 36.1 kilometres (22.4 mi). It passes the southern entry to Steve Irwin Way, a bypassed section of the highway, which provides access to Beerburrum, Glass House Mountains, Beerwah, Australia Zoo and Landsborough before terminating at the Caloundra Road interchange.

The Caloundra Road Interchange is also Australia's first Diverging diamond interchange.

==== Caloundra to Noosa ====
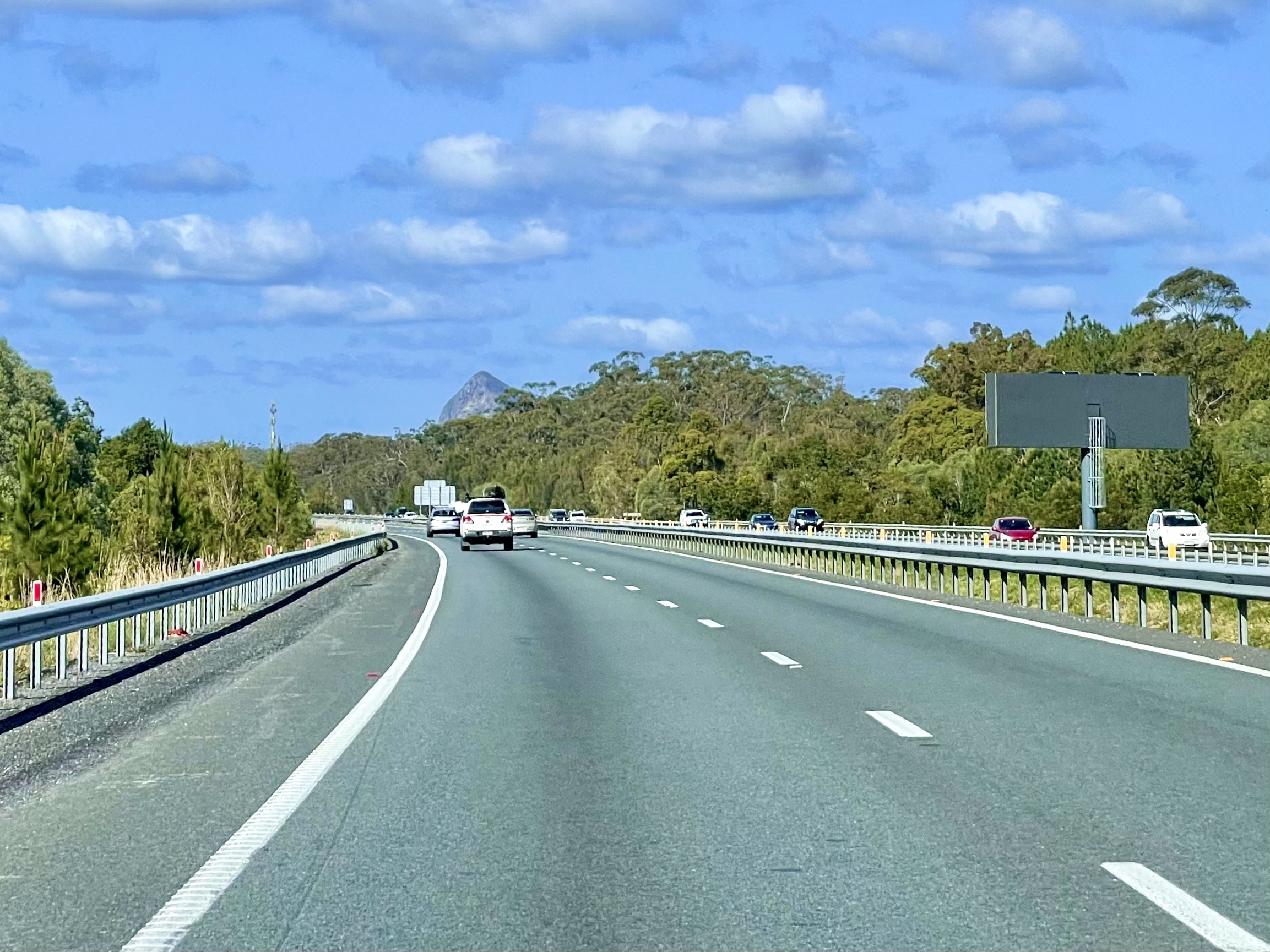
Bruce Highway at Beerwah, 2021

The next 5.6 kilometres (3.5 mi) to the Sunshine Motorway interchange, providing access to the Sunshine Coast, widens to 3 lanes in either direction. It then narrows back to 2 lanes. After another 7.5 kilometres (4.7 mi) the Maroochydore Road interchange provides access to Maroochydore and Woombye. The Bli Bli Road interchange, after a further 7 kilometres (4.3 mi), provides access to Bli Bli and Nambour. The Yandina–Coolum Road interchange, after 6.7 kilometres (4.2 mi), provides access to Yandina and Coolum. The Eumundi interchange, after 8.4 kilometres (5.2 mi), provides access to Eumundi and Noosa. The Cooroy interchange, after 7.2 kilometres (4.5 mi), provides access to Cooroy, Tewantin and Noosa. Total distance from Caloundra Road to this interchange is 42.4 kilometres (26.3 mi).

==== Noosa to Gympie ====
The 33 kilometres (21 mi) to the end of the M1 at Kybong includes three interchanges that provide access to the Old Bruce Highway. From Kybong the highway is designated A1. It has numerous parts with lower speed limits, including urban areas, high crash zones and roadwork sites. After 8 kilometres (5.0 mi) from Kybong the Mary Valley Road interchange provides access to the west of the Mary River. The highway then passes through the Gympie urban fringe, with several at grade intersections providing access to various parts of the city. North of Gympie, 14.3 kilometres (8.9 mi) from the Mary Valley Road interchange, the Wide Bay Highway interchange is reached, providing access to Kilkivan. Total distance from the Cooroy interchange is 55.4 kilometres (34.4 mi).

==== Gympie to Maryborough ====
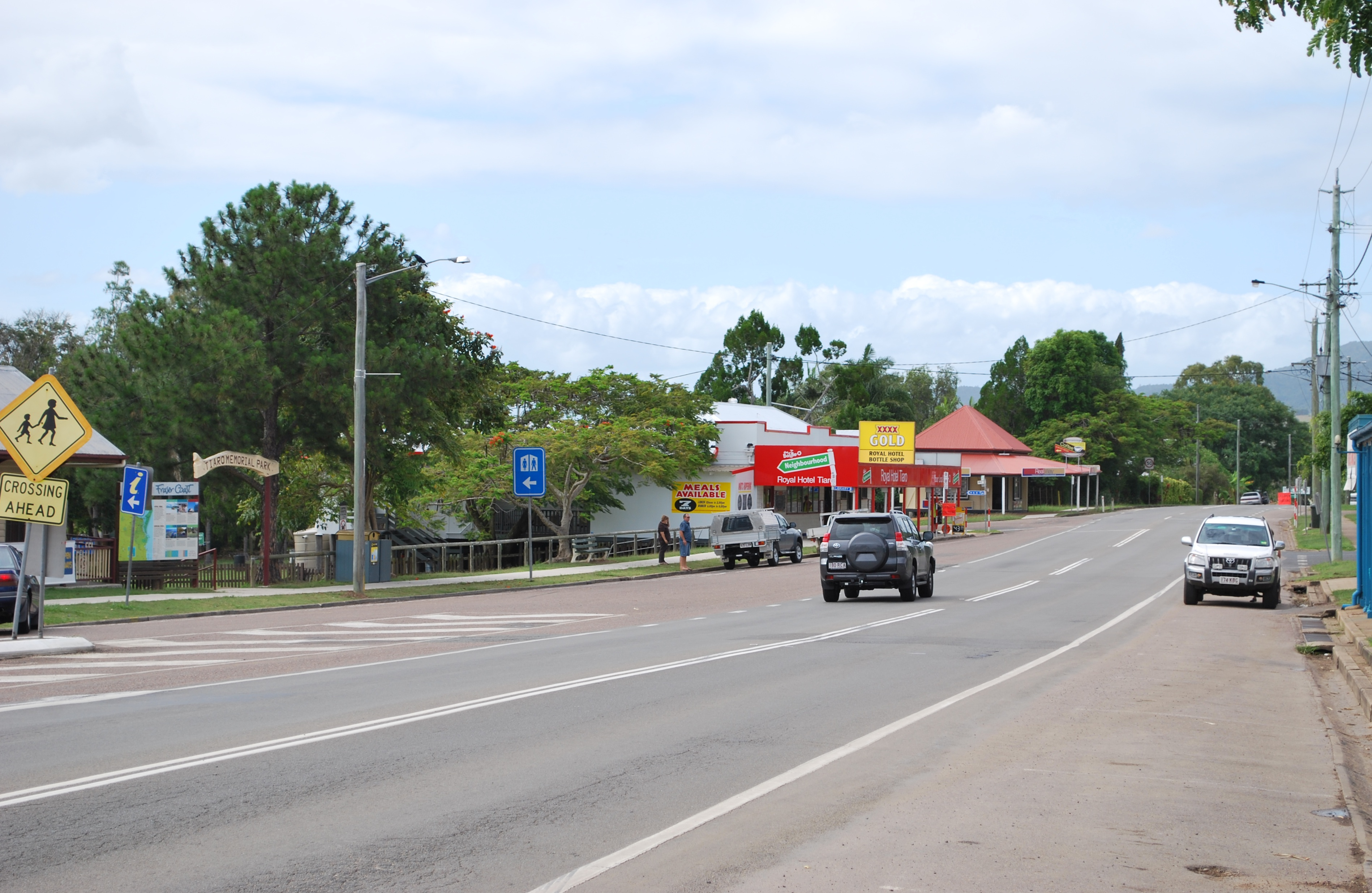
Bruce Highway at Tiaro, 2010

The 73.9 kilometres (45.9 mi) from the Wide Bay Highway interchange to the Maryborough–Biggenden Road interchange at Maryborough passes through Tiaro and the Gympie Road exit to Maryborough before crossing the Mary River.

==== Maryborough to Rockhampton ====
The highway maintains a speed limit of 100 occasionally slowing down to 60 or 50 while driving through several small towns including Childers, Gin Gin, Miriam Vale and Mount Larcom before reaching Rockhampton.

== Development of the M1 ==
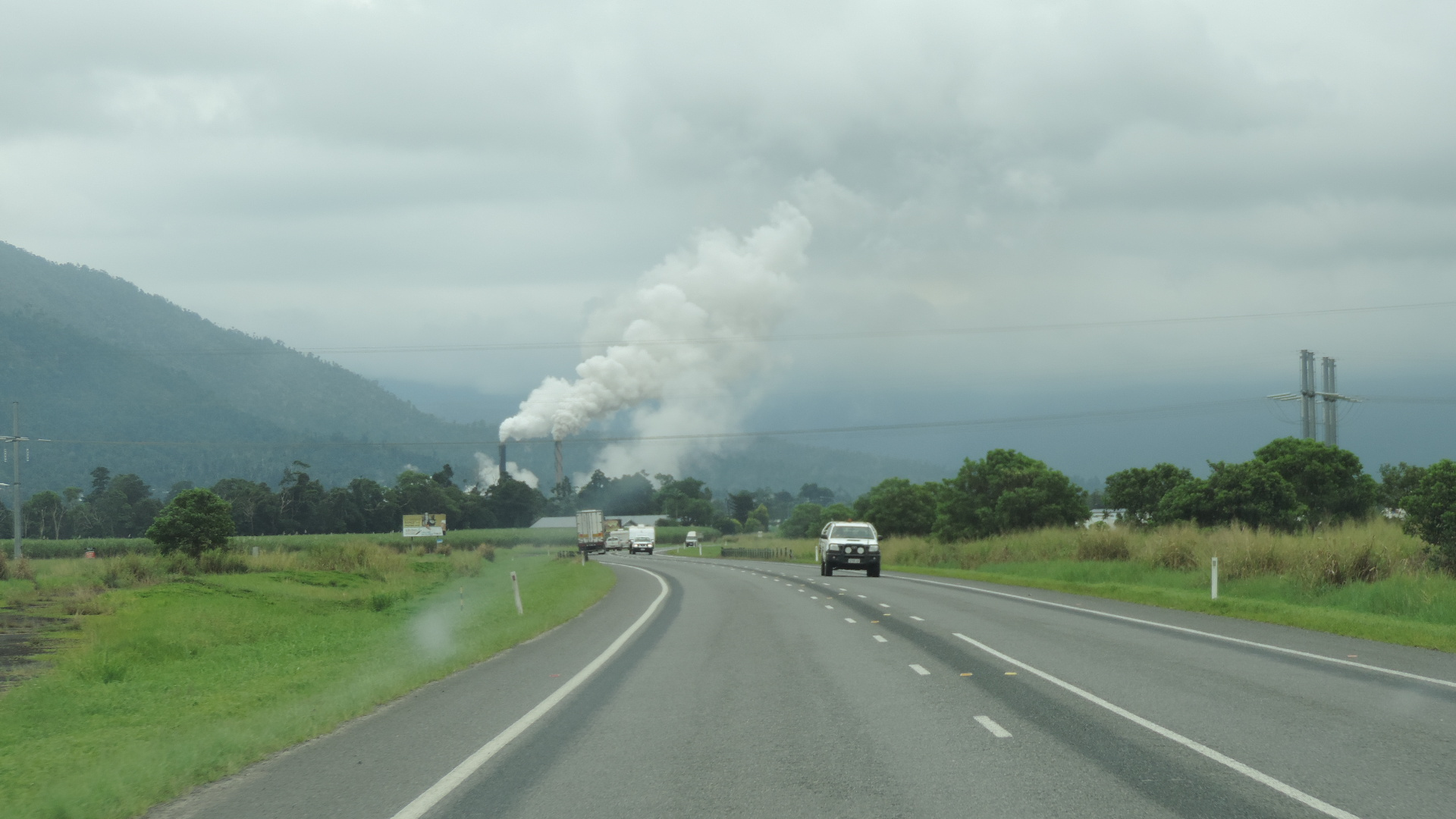
Bruce Highway near Tully, 2016

With the completion of Section D of the Bruce Highway – Cooroy to Curra upgrade project (Woondum to Curra) in October 2024 the M1 has now been extended to Curra, 14 kilometres (8.7 mi) north of Gympie. The Bruce Highway from Curra onwards remains signed as A1.

Further extensions are currently not funded by the federal government excluding the Tiaro Bypass, which will be built to motorway standard and will start construction in mid-2027.

== History ==
=== Remnants of early roads to the north of Brisbane ===
Roads to the north of Brisbane in the early days of settlement were constrained by the need to use reliable low level crossings of rivers and creeks well upstream from the coast.

South Pine Road runs from Enoggera Road at Alderley through Everton Park to Everton Hills, crossing Kedron Brook.

Bunya Road runs from South Pine Road at Everton Hills to Eatons Crossing Road at Draper, after crossing the South Pine River at Drapers Crossing (a fordable crossing).

Old Northern Road runs from South Pine Road at Everton Park to another South Pine Road at Albany Creek. Eatons Crossing Road runs from this road (north of the South Pine River) to Draper. This South Pine Road continues north over the South Pine River via Cash's Crossing and thence to Gympie Road at Strathpine.

Old North Road links this South Pine Road at Brendale to Youngs Crossing Road at Bray Park. Youngs Crossing Road continues to Dayboro Road at Petrie after crossing the North Pine River. Further upstream, Whiteside Road (now submerged by Lake Samsonvale) provided a fordable crossing at Quinn's Crossing when water level was too high at Youngs Crossing.

Further north, another segment of Old North Road starts at Caboolture River Road in Upper Caboolture, crosses the Caboolture River at Zillmans Crossing and proceeds to Wamuran.

Early roads from the North Pine River crossing to the Caboolture River crossing may have included parts of:

- Narangba Road from Anzac Avenue in Kallangur to Narangba, where it becomes (after a short distance as Main Street) Oakey Flat Road, to Morayfield Road at Morayfield.
- Burpengary Road from Boundary Road at Dakabin to Burpengary, where it becomes Station Road. From Station Road the direct route to Morayfield follows Obrien Road and Lindsay Road.
- Old Gympie Road from Anzac Avenue in Kallangur to Morayfield Road at Burpengary.
- Caboolture River Road from Morayfield Road at Morayfield to Old North Road at Upper Caboolture.

The Oakey Flat Road route avoids the crossing of Burpengary Creek on Obrien Road at Burpengary. From Oakey Flat Road at Morayfield a route consisting of Williamson Road, Forest Hills Drive, Haywood Road and Moorina Road runs to Caboolture River Road at Upper Caboolture, avoiding the crossing of Sheep Station Creek on Morayfield Road at Morayfield.

Early roads from Caboolture (after travelling east from Wamuran) to Landsborough and then to the Bruce Highway at Palmview may have included parts of:

- Another segment of Old Gympie Road from Caboolture to Landsborough.
- Beerburrum Road from Caboolture to Beerburrum, where it joins the Steve Irwin Way to Landsborough and Palmview.

=== Tom Petrie’s roads ===
==== Murrumba Homestead Grounds ====
The following quotations are from the Murrumba Homestead Grounds article.

- "To facilitate his timber operations Tom Petrie marked out several early northern roads, including a track between the Pine River and Bald Hills and a trail from Murrumba to Maroochydore, which later became the Gympie Road. He also blazed a track from North Pine to Humpybong (Redcliffe)."
- "In 1869 Cobb & Co opened a coach route from Brisbane to Gympie via the route Tom had helped mark out."

==== Anzac Avenue ====
Anzac Avenue is part of the history of the Bruce Highway as the highway followed it from Petrie to Rothwell for many years prior to the construction of its present alignment.

The following quotation is from the Anzac Avenue article.

- "A road from Bald Hills to Redcliffe was formed by the early 1860s, but by 1864 this was almost impassable. Tom Petrie marked a track from the Hays Inlet crossing and in the early 1870s assisted in surveying the road. Known as the "Brisbane Road" it became the primary way of accessing the Redcliffe Peninsula by road."

== Upgrades ==
One of the most dramatic deviations of the highway was the Bald Hills to Burpengary Deviation. Beginning construction in 1972, the new route stretched from Roghan Road at Bald Hills to Deception Bay Road at Burpengary. Construction took place across four stages, the last of which was opened on 10 November 1977.

Due to the nature of wet weather and tropical cyclone prone areas of North Queensland, the highway is prone to frequent flooding in a number of places. Following the catastrophic Queensland floods in 2010–2011 the Australian Government commissioned a feasibility study on flood-proofing the highway.

Numerous stretches of the highway are set to undergo redevelopment, realignment, flood-proofing and extension of dual carriageway sections. Former Premier Anna Bligh announced the plans while launching the Queensland Infrastructure Plan (Now (A part of) known as Building Our Future, it includes all Transport Infrastructure Projects Nation-wide). The works are expected to total A$2 billion and include 77 projects over a period of two decades. As of December 2020, 23 major projects had been completed under the program including the delivery of 64 bridges, 30 new rest stops, 300 km safer roadsides, and 190 km wide centre line treatments.

To improve flood immunity of the highway south of Childers, a new and improved road alignment and a higher bridge over the Isis River were completed in September 2011.

Between the Gateway Motorway and Caboolture, the highway has been widened to eight and six lanes since 2001, including the Dohles Rocks Road to Boundary Road section in October 2004, the Boundary Road to Uhlmann Road section in March 2007, and the latest section Uhlmann Road to Bribie Island Road in November 2009. Extension of the six lane section to Steve Irwin Way is proposed to commence in 2020.

A new interchange has been built at the notorious intersection of Roys Road at Beerwah. It also connects to the nearby Bells Creek Road, eliminating another dangerous intersection.

The Nambour-Bli Bli Road interchange was upgraded in 1997 from a half-diamond to a dumbbell. The old interchange had lasted just 7 years. Later on, the entire Nambour Bypass went through a process of rehabilitation due to the extremely rough surface and dangerous pothole appearances during wet weather. This work was completed in 2009.

As of 2020 Sections A, B & C of the joint State and Federal funded 61 kilometres (38 mi) Cooroy to Curra upgrade of the highway are open. The final part of the upgrade, Section D, which provides a motorway-standard bypass of Gympie, opened in October 2024.

In January 2025, the Australian prime minister announced that the Bruce Highway would get AU$7.2 billion dollars funding from the Australian Government. This funding is meant to upgrade failing sections of the highway between Mackay and Bowen, notably around the very flood prone section south of Proserpine known as Goorganga Plains. This section is earmarked for an elevated carriageway similar to what was built at the Yeppen Floodplain near Rockhampton. The Goorganga Plains section can be closed for days resulting in huge economic loss for the state of Queensland.

=== Major upgrades: Bald Hills to Cooroy ===
| Date | Details |
|---|---|
| late 1965 or early 1966 | 2 mile section of dual carriageway from Woombye to Nambour completed, including two new bridges over Paynters Creek. |
| August 1966 | Caboolture Bypass Stage 1. Single-carriageway completed between Burpengary Creek and Bribie Island Road. |
| 1967 | Second carriageway between the Redcliffe turnoff at Burpengary and the southern end of the Caboolture Bypass completed. |
| late 1969 or early 1970 | New bridges completed over the railway line at Kulangoor and over the South Maroochy River at Yandina. |
| August 1970 | Caboolture Bypass Stage 2. Single-carriageway completed between Bribie Island Road and Red Road. |
| mid 1971 | Zillmere Road to Roghan Road duplication, including duplicate bridge over Cabbage Tree Creek. |
| December 1972 | Single-carriageway deviation between Eumundi and Cooroy. The old alignment is now Eumundi Range Road. |
| December 1973 | Bald Hills to Burpengary Deviation Stage 1 (Roghan Road to Strathpine Road) |
| December 1973 | Beerwah Bypass. 2.5 km-long deviation completed between Roys Road and Foley Road including a new concrete bridge across Coochin Creek. |
| November 1974 | 6 km-long single-carriageway deviation completed between Yandina and Eumundi. The old alignment is now Bunya Road. |
| December 1974 | Glasshouse Mountains Bypass. 1.5 km-long deviation completed between Glasshouse Mountains Sportsground and Kings Road including a new concrete bridge across Coonowrin Creek. |
| August 1976 | Eumundi Bypass. 2.4 km-long deviation completed between Eumundi-Noosa Road and Eumundi-Kenilworth Road. |
| 2 August 1976 | Bald Hills to Burpengary Deviation Stage 2. 12 km-long single-carriageway deviation completed between Strathpine Road and Boundary Road. |
| March 1977 | Bald Hills to Burpengary Deviation Stage 3. Second carriageway completed between Strathpine Road and Boundary Road. |
| 10 November 1977 | Bald Hills to Burpengary Deviation Stage 4. Boundary Road to Deception Bay Road section completed. |
| 9 August 1979 | Burpengary Creek to Bribie Island Road Duplication. Second carriageway completed between Burpengary Creek and Bribie Island Road, including interchanges at Station Road, Uhlmann Road, and Bribie Island Road. |
| 30 June 1983 | Bribie Island Road to Beerburrum Creek duplication. |
| 9 December 1985 | Beerburrum Creek to Caloundra Road Deviation. Major 26.5 km-long four lane deviation completed between Beerburrum Creek and Caloundra Road. |
| September 1987 | Caloundra Road to Sippy Creek duplication. |
| 16 November 1989 | Tanawha Deviation. Four lane deviation completed between Sippy Creek and Maroochydore Road. |
| 23 November 1990 | Nambour Bypass. 11 km long bypass of Nambour, dual carriageway from Maroochydore Road to Nambour-Bli Bli Road and single carriageway from Nambour-Bli Bli Road to Kulangoor. |
| 17 May 1994 | Cooroy Bypass. Single-carriageway bypass of Cooroy officially opened by Minister for Transport David Hamill. |
| November 1996 | Morayfield Interchange. New interchange opened at Buchanans Road, Morayfield, replacing at-grade intersections there and at Old Coach Road. |
| 17 July 1997 | Yandina Bypass. Dual-carriageway bypass of Yandina officially opened by Federal Minister for Transport John Sharp. Duplication from Nambour-Bli Bli Road to Kulangoor and the Parklands Interchange were also opened at this time. |
| 23 July 2002 | Gateway Motorway to Dohles Rocks Road six-laning. |
| 19 September 2003 | Yandina to Cooroy Duplication. Dual-carriageways completed between Browns Creek and Eumundi Range. |
| 20 January 2005 | Dohles Rocks Road to Boundary Road six-laning. Six-lane upgrade completed between Dohles Rocks Road and Boundary Road, including upgrades to the Anzac Avenue interchange. |
| 12 March 2007 | Boundary Road to Uhlmann Road six-laning. Six-lane upgrade completed between Boundary Road and Uhlmann Road, including upgrades to the Deception Bay Road and Uhlmann Road interchanges. |
| 5 November 2009 | Uhlmann Road to Bribie Island Road six-laning. Six-lane upgrade completed between Uhlmann and Bribie Island Roads, including upgrades to the Bribie Island Road interchange. |
| 8 September 2017 | Boundary Road interchange upgrade. |
| August 2021 | Six-lane upgrade completed between Caloundra Road and Sunshine Motorway, including upgrades to both interchanges, and also included smart technologies. |
| April 2024 | Six-lane upgrade completed between Bribie Island Road and Steve Irwin Way, including upgrades to creek crossings and the Pumicestone Road interchange. |

=== Major upgrades: Cooroy to Rockhampton ===
| Date | Details |
|---|---|
| May 1940 | Wallaville – Burnett River Bridge |
| 1956 | Isis River Bridge replacement |
| December 1967 | Ambrose to Raglan Deviation: New highway built from Sinclair Street (Ambrose) to modern-day Raglan Station Road (Raglan), which bypassed a 14 km stretch of road. |
| 1971 | Coles Creek Deviation |
| April 1973 | Gunalda Bypass |
| 1974 | Gavial Deviation: New road built from the southern end of Roope Road to Jellicoe Street, bypassing Port Curtis Road. A new Burnett Highway junction was built as well. |
| April 1975 | Calliope River Bridge |
| August 1976 | Bauple Deviation (9.6 km) |
| May 1977 | Bajool Bypass |
| April 1979 | McKenzie Creek Deviation (3.3 km) |
| 1980 | McKenzie Creek to Oaky Creek Deviation (1.8 km) |
| May 1984 | Howard-Torbanlea Deviation |
| 1985 | Curra deviation. 4.6 km of new road built to bypass a narrow railway bridge at Harvey Siding Road. |
| 7 October 1986 | Rockhampton Deviation: New road built from the new Capricorn Highway roundabout to the existing Burnett Highway junction (built in 1974). |
| 14 September 1990 | Maryborough Bypass |
| 16 November 1991 | Glenwood Deviation. Old alignment now Shadbolt Road, Bolderrow Road and Murphys Road. |
| 5 July 1999 | Wallaville Deviation – Tim Fischer Bridge |
| 2000 | Skyring Creek bridge replacement. |
| 14 February 2001 | Gunalda Range Deviation. Old alignment now Bonnick Road and Davey Road |
| August 2011 | Isis River Bridge replacement, 1956 bridge replaced. |
| 18 December 2012 | Cooroy to Curra Upgrade Section B |
| 28 October 2013 | Rockhampton – Yeppen North |
| 11 June 2014 | Calliope Interchange |
| 22 October 2015 | Rockhampton – Yeppen South |
| 5 May 2017 | Cooroy to Curra Upgrade Section A |
| 9 November 2017 | Cooroy to Curra Upgrade Section C |
| May 2021 | Calliope River to Mount Larcom, improve safety. |
| August 2021 | Gentle Annie Road to St Arnauds Creek. |
| November 2021 | Wide Bay Highway intersection upgrade. |
| January 2022 | Tinana overtaking lanes. |
| 15 October 2024 | Cooroy to Curra Section D (Gympie Bypass) opens. |
| Late 2025 | Calliope culvert upgrade, just south of the interchange |

=== Major upgrades: Rockhampton to Townsville ===
| Date | Details |
|---|---|
| 10 May 1973 | Bowen – Don River Bridge |
| January 1975 | Parkhurst – Ramsey Creek Bridge |
| 23 December 1977 | Mackay – Bakers Creek Deviation |
| 12 July 1980 | Mackay Deviation – Ron Camm Bridge |
| 16 August 1980 | Rockhampton Deviation – Neville Hewitt Bridge |
| 29 October 1982 | Marlborough–Sarina alignment change. (Project commenced in 1974) |
| September 1984 | Thoopara – 3.4 km deviation and new bridge over O'Connell River |
| 1991 | Mackay City Gates – Realignment of Nebo Road at the City Gates with provision of an overpass to allow for future North Coast Railway realignment (railway realignment officially opened in 1993) |
| July 1993 | Barratta – Collinsons Lagoon realignment |
| December 1993 | Barratta – Middle and East Barratta Creek realignments |
| 1994 | Thoopara – New deviation south of O'Connell River bridge. Remnants of old highway known now as Magees Road and Thomsetts Road |
| 20 April 1994 | Yaamba/Milman Deviation – new alignment with higher-level bridges at Alligator and Plentiful Creeks in response to 1991 Flood |
| September 1994 | Townsville – 1.7 km duplication of University Road from Angus Smith Drive to Mark Reid Drive |
| January 1996 | Townsville – Duplication of Nathan Street from Bergin Road to Angus Smith Drive (includes Charles N. Barton Bridge Duplication). Upon project completion, alignment of National Highway 1 officially moved to University Road, Nathan Street and Duckworth Street. |
| May 1997 | Townsville – 3.2 km duplication of University Road from Flinders Highway to Mark Reid Drive. |
| December 1997 | Townsville – Duckworth Street duplication. |
| 18 December 1998 | Mackay – Ron Camm Bridge duplication |
| December 2009 | Mackay – Boundary Road to Farrellys Lane duplication and intersection upgrade |
| 2012 | Mackay – Boundary Road to City Gates intersection upgrades |
| October 2013 | Mackay – Farrellys Road to Temples Lane duplication and intersection upgrades |
| February 2015 | Brandon – Sandy Corner to Collinsons Lagoon realignment for flood mitigation and cane rail overpass |
| October 2015 | Townsville – Vantassel Street to Cluden Drive duplication, rail overpass and intersection upgrades |
| August 2021 | Rockhampton Northern Access Upgrade: duplication of Yaamba Road from Yeppoon Road to Terranova Drive. |
| December 2021 | Mackay to Proserpine, Bruce Highway Safety Package (Leap to Careys Creek) |
| December 2021 | Rockhampton – St Lawrence, provide bicycle on and off-road paths. |
| December 2021 | Rockhampton – St Lawrence, Carlton Street to Yeppoon Road, improve cycle facilities. |
| July 2022 | Giru, Haughton River Floodplain Upgrade, construct bridges and approaches. |

=== Major upgrades: Townsville to Cairns ===
| Date | Details |
|---|---|
| 1959 | Gordonvale/Aloomba Bypass Stage 1: Swan Creek to Riverstone Road, including Carl Wordsworth Bridge |
| 1961 | Gordonvale/Aloomba Bypass Stage 2: Mackey's Creek to Riverstone Road, bypass of Gordonvale |
| 1962 | Rollingstone Deviation |
| 1963 | Gordonvale/Aloomba Bypass Stage 3: Swan Creek to Leumann Road, bypass of Aloomba |
| 1966 | Gordonvale/Aloomba Bypass Stage 4: Leumann Road to Assman Road |
| 28 September 1968 | Ingham Deviation – John Row Bridge at Herbert River |
| December 1968 | Bellenden Plains / Murray River Deviation – replaced in 2008 by Tully Alliance Project |
| 1970 | Bellenden Ker Deviation: new alignment built to the west of the North Coast Railway line, includes new bridge over Harvey Creek |
| 1971 | Cairns – Duplication of Mulgrave Road from Aumuller Street to Draper Street |
| October 1971 | Townsville – Black River Bridge |
| 9 July 1973 | Innisfail Deviation – Centenary Bridge |
| 1974 | Townsville – Partial realignment of Bruce Highway. Alignment shifted off of Ingham Road onto Woolcock Street between Charters Towers Road and Kings Road |
| 1976 | Townsville – Partial realignment of Bruce Highway. Woolcock street extended to Hugh Street and Dalrymple Road |
| 1976 | Cairns – Duplication of Mulgrave Road from McCoombe Street to Aumuller Street |
| 1981 | Innisfail – Sir Joseph McAvoy Bridge |
| 1982 | Cairns – Clarkes Creek to Gordon Creek duplication |
| 10 November 1984 | Rollingstone Creek – High-level bridge |
| 1986 | Townsville – Duplication of Woolcock Street from Hugh Street to Sturt Street |
| 1987 | Cairns – Sheehy Road to Skeleton Creek duplication |
| 23 April 1987 | Cardwell Range Deviation (South) |
| 4 December 1987 | Mutarnee – Ollera Creek Bridge and Mutarnee Deviation |
| 1989 | Cairns – Gordon Creek to Sheehy Road duplication |
| 17 October 1991 | Babinda Bypass Project Stage 1: Lloyd's Corner/Stager Road to Eastwood Street |
| December 1992 | Townsville – High-level bridge over Bohle River |
| 1993 | Babinda Bypass Project: Eastwood Street to Nelson Road |
| 1993 | Edmonton – Skeleton Creek to Robert Road duplication |
| September 1993 | Townsville – Stony Creek to Bohle River duplication |
| 1994 | Babinda Bypass Project Stage 3: Nelson Road to Frenchmans Creek |
| 1995 | Townsville – Duplication of Woolcock Street from Sturt Street to Charters Towers Road |
| 1997 | Cairns – Duplication of Florence Street from McLeod Street to Draper Street |
| March 1998 | Townsville Deviation – Woolcock Street extension from Duckworth Street to Bohle River. Alignment of National Highway 1 officially moved from Ingham Road upon project completion |
| 1999 | Edmonton Deviation – realignment and four-laning |
| 2003 | Cairns – Ray Jones Drive to Sheehy Road six-laning |
| 2004 | Cairns – Sheehy Road to Foster Road six-laning |
| 2008 | Tully Alliance Project – New deviation from Tully State High School to Corduroy Creek. Includes new crossing over Tully and Murray Rivers, cane rail overpass replacing a level crossing at Silky Oak. |
| 17 April 2009 | Townsville Ring Road Stage 3 – National Highway A1 moved from Nathan and Duckworth Streets onto Shaw Road, continuing into The Ring Road. |
| 20 April 2009 | Higher-level Mulgrave River Bridge – Desmond Trannore Bridge |
| June 2009 | Mount Low Overpass Townsville |
| 1 November 2013 | Cardwell Range Deviation (North) |
| May 2014 | Cairns Southern Access Upgrade – Stage 1 |
| December 2016 | Townsville Ring Road Stage 4 – National Highway A1 officially moved from Shaw Road |
| August 2017 | Cairns Southern Access Upgrade – Stage 2: Foster Road to Robert Road six-laning |
| July 2021 | Cairns Southern Access Corridor (Stage 4), Kate Street to Aumuller Street, widen to six lanes. |
| Late 2021 | Townsville–Ingham, Hechts Road to Easter Creek Safety Upgrade Project. |
| November 2023 | Townsville Ring Road Stage 5 – Duplication of the Ring Road from Shaw Road to Riverway Drive. New interchange constructed at Beck Road |
| December 2023 | Cairns Southern Access Upgrade – Stage 3: Petersen Road to Gillies Range Road/Riverstone Road duplication |

=== Projects ===
List of projects on the Bruce Highway
| Project | Length (km) | Construction dates | | Value | Status | Description | Distance from Brisbane (km) |
| Project | Length (km) | Start | End | Value | Status | Description | Distance from Brisbane (km) |
|---|---|---|---|---|---|---|---|
| Cooroy to Federal | 13.5 | July 2013 | May 2017 | $590 million | Complete | Section A of Cooroy to Curra. Four lane divided highway, new alignment. | 126 |
| Federal to Traveston | 12 | September 2009 | December 2012 | $513 million | Complete | Section B of Cooroy to Curra. Four lane divided highway, new alignment. | 140 |
| Yeppen South | 2.8 | 27 November 2013 | 2016 | $296 million | Complete | New elevated crossing across the Yeppen Floodplain as additional carriageway | 628 |
| Yeppen North | 1 | | 27 November 2013 | $85 million | Complete | Safety and traffic flow improvements | 631 |
| Mackay Ring Road (Stage 1) | 11.3 | Mid 2017 | Late 2019 | $560 million | In planning | Two lane highway, new alignment. | 963 |
| Townsville Ring Road (Section 4) | 11 | TBA | TBA | $200 million | In planning | 4 lane motorway, new alignment. | 1366 |
| Cairns Bruce Highway Upgrade (Sheehy Road to Ray Jones Drive) | 3.4 | 2010 | April 2014 | $150 million | Complete | New interchanges, widening of road | 1696 |
| Tiaro Bypass | 8 | TBA | TBA | $336 million | In planning | 4 lane motorway, new alignment | 229 |
| Bowen Connection Road to Champion Street intersection | 6 | March 2021 | Late 2022 | $22 million | Under construction | Widen pavement | |
| Bowen – Ayr, West Euri to Arrow Creek, South of Plain Creek, North of Armstrong Creek, Between Arrow Creek and Slater Creek | | | December 2022 | $42.39 million | Under construction | Construct overtaking lanes | |
| Caboolture – Bribie Island Road to Steve Irwin Way | 11 | November 2020 | Late 2023 | $662.5 million | Under construction | Widen from 4 to 6 lanes | |
| Cooroy to Curra, Section D | 26 | Late 2020 | October 2024 | $1 billion | Complete | 4-lane divided highway | |
| Gin Gin to Benaraby, south of Miriam Vale between Charnwood Road and Fairbairn Flats | 12 | April 2021 | December 2022 | $43.448 million | Under construction | Improve safety, construct overtaking lane and wide centre line treatment | |
| Gympie – Maryborough, Gootchie Road to Sheehans Road | | | Late 2022 | $26.64 million | Under construction | Widen pavement and improve safety | |
| Ingham – Innisfail, East Feluga Road and Feluga Road | | | Late 2022 | $8.4 million | Under construction | Improve intersection | |
| Ingham – Innisfail, Gairloch (5 km north of Ingham) | 13 | November 2021 | | $40 million | In planning | Safety improvements | |
| Ingham – Innisfail, Smiths Gap, near Friday Pocket Road approximately 2 km south of El Arish | | July 2020 | | $13.8 million | Under construction | Construct southbound overtaking lane and fauna overpass | |
| Innisfail Bypass | | July 2022 | February 2024 | $9 million | In planning | Plan and preserve corridor | |
| Babinda, Munro street | | October 2020 | | $7.23 million | Under construction | Intersection upgrade | |
| Mackay – Proserpine, Jumper Creek, about 57 km north of Mackay | 1 | April 2022 | Mid 2023 | $23 million | Under construction | Upgrade flood immunity | |
| Mackay – Proserpine, Knobels Road and Nebia Coningsby Road at Farleigh | 1 | June 2022 | Mid 2023 | $7 million | Under construction | Upgrade intersection and approaches | |
| Maryborough – Gin Gin, Saltwater Creek and Deadmans Gully | 11 | July 2021 | Late 2022 | $103 million | Under construction | Flood immunity upgrades | |
| Maryborough – Gin Gin, various locations including Wongi to Nulla Flats | 16 | Early 2022 | Early 2023 | $9.35 million | Under construction | Improve safety | |
| Proserpine – Bowen, Emu Creek to Drays Road | 20 | | December 2022 | $38.82 million | Under construction | Various locations, widen formation | |
| Proserpine – Bowen, Ten Mile Creek to Yeates Creek | | August 2021 | December 2023 | $44.07 million | Under construction | Improve safety | |
| Proserpine – Bowen, Bowen Connection Road | | March 2021 | Late 2022 | $8.03 million | Under construction | Improve intersection | |
| Rockhampton – St Lawrence, Neilsen Avenue to Plentiful Creek | | | August 2022 | $32.25 million | Under construction | Improve safety | |
| Pine River to Caloundra Road | | | Late 2020 | $10 million | Completed | Planning Project | |
| Deception Bay Road Interchange | | November 2020 | | $163.3 million | Under construction | Upgrade | |
| Deception Bay Road to Caboolture-Bribie Island Road | | | | $2 million | In planning | Upgrade Planning | |
| Maroochydore Road and Mons Road Interchanges | | | Mid 2023 | $301.25 million | Under construction | Upgrade interchanges | |
| Sunshine Motorway to Maroochydore Road | | | | $500,000 | Future planning | Upgrade planning | |
| Pine River to Caloundra Road Smart Motorways (Stage 2) | | Early 2021 | 2024 | $105 million | Under construction | Smart Motorways | |
| Cairns Southern Access Corridor (Stage 3), Edmonton to Gordonvale | 10.5 | | Mid 2023 | $481 million | Under construction | Upgrade and duplication | |
| Cairns Southern Access Corridor (Stage 5), Foster Road | | | Early 2024 | $225 million | In planning | Upgrade intersection | |
| Cooroy to Curra | 62 | | Mid 2024 | $2,384.24 million | Pre-construction | Realignment and upgrade to 4 lanes | |
| Burdekin River Bridge | | | Mid 2022 | $96.9 million | Under construction | Maintenance and rehabilitation program | |
| Mackay Northern Access Upgrade | | | August 2022 | $144.55 million | Under construction | Construct additional lanes | |
| Gateway Motorway and the Bruce Highway Upgrade | | Mid 2020 | | $2.1 billion | In planning | Upgrading the Gateway Motorway (Bracken Ridge to Pine River).; Upgrading the Bruce Highway (Gateway Motorway to Dohles Rocks Road).; Upgrading Gympie Arterial Road (Strathpine Road to Gateway Motorway).; Delivering north-facing ramps (northern connections) at Dohles Rocks Road interchange to the Bruce Highway.; Building the North South Urban Arterial corridor between Dohles Rocks Road and Anzac Avenue. | |
| Townsville Northern Access Intersections Upgrade | | May 2021 | Early 2023 | $107.65 million | Under construction | Intersections Upgrade (Veales Road to Pope Road) | |
| Boogan Road, Mourilyan Upgrade | | Late 2021 | December 2022 | $7.1 million | Under construction | Pavement widening and strengthening | |

== Northern Australian Beef Roads Upgrade ==
The Northern Australia Beef Roads Program announced in 2016 included the following project:

=== Road train access to Rockhampton (stage 2) ===
The project for upgrading between Gracemere saleyards and the Rockhampton abattoirs to provide access for Type 1 Road Trains was completed by early 2021 at a total cost of $30 million. It involved about 29 kilometres (18 mi) of road improvements on four roads:

- Capricorn Highway – from Saleyards Road at Gracemere to the Bruce Highway roundabout at Rockhampton (7.7 kilometres (4.8 mi)).
- Bruce Highway – from the Capricorn Highway roundabout to the Yaamba Road intersection (8.3 kilometres (5.2 mi)).
- Rockhampton–Yeppoon Road – from the Bruce Highway intersection south-west to the Emu Park Road intersection (2.4 kilometres (1.5 mi).
- Rockhampton–Emu Park Road – from the Rockhampton–Yeppoon Road intersection to St Christophers Chapel Road at Nerimbera (10.2 kilometres (6.3 mi)).

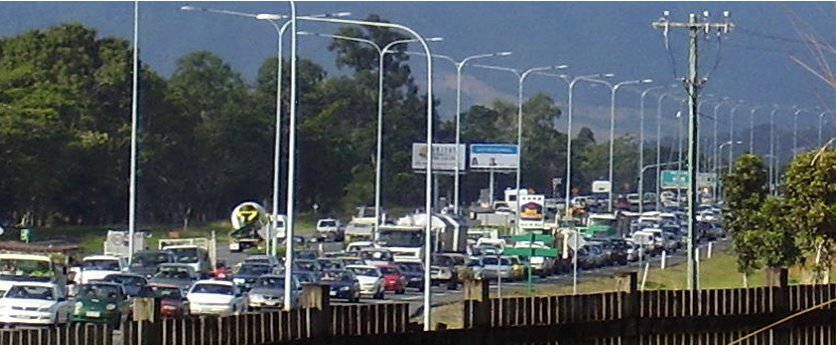
The Bruce Highway in Cairns southern suburbs at morning peak hour.

== Highway towns ==
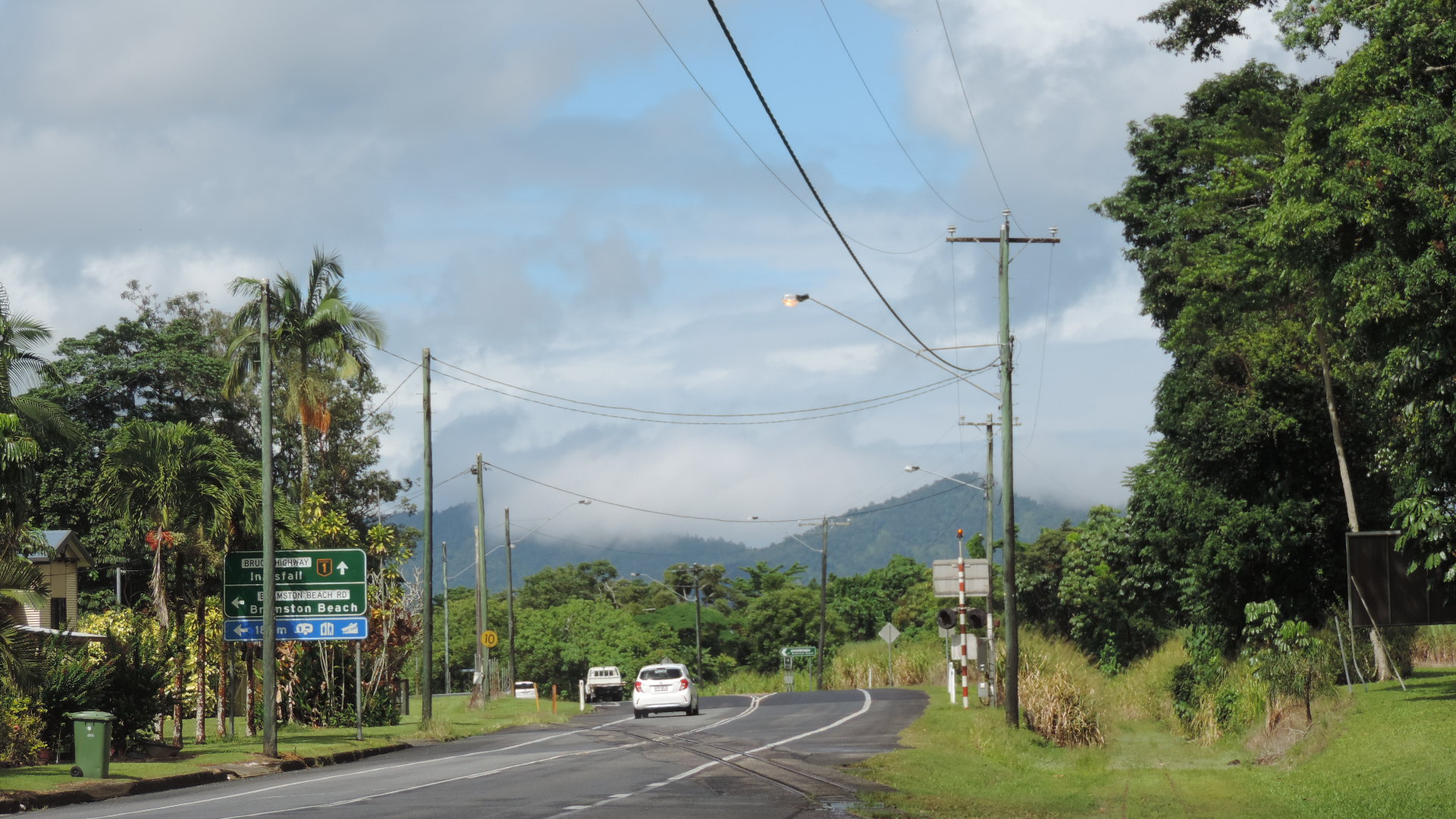
Bruce Highway passing through Mirriwinni, Cairns Region, 2018

Travelling north, the following towns and small cities are found on (or very close to) the Bruce Highway.

=== Brisbane to Maryborough ===
- Narangba
- Burpengary
- Morayfield
- Caboolture
- Elimbah
- Beerburrum
- Glass House Mountains
- Beerwah
- Landsborough
- Woombye
- Nambour
- Bli Bli
- Yandina
- North Arm
- Eumundi
- Cooroy
- Pomona
- Cooran
- Traveston
- Gympie
- Gunalda
- Bauple
- Tiaro
- Owanyilla
- Tinana

=== Maryborough to Rockhampton ===
- Aldershot
- Torbanlea
- Howard
- Horton
- Childers
- Appletree Creek
- Booyal
- Wallaville
- Gin Gin
- Miriam Vale
- Bororen
- Benaraby
- Calliope
- Mount Larcom
- Ambrose
- Raglan
- Marmor
- Bajool
- Gracemere

=== Rockhampton to Mackay ===
- The Caves
- Yaamba
- Marlborough
- Ogmore
- St Lawrence
- Clairview
- Carmila
- Ilbilbie
- Koumala
- Sarina
- Bakers Creek

=== Mackay to Townsville ===
- Glenella
- Farleigh
- Kuttabul
- Mount Ossa
- Kolijo & Calen
- Yalboroo
- Bloomsbury
- Proserpine
- Bowen & Merinda
- Guthalungra
- Gumlu
- Inkerman
- Home Hill
- Ayr
- Brandon

=== Townsville to Cairns ===
- Deeragun
- Yabulu
- Bluewater
- Rollingstone
- Mutarnee
- Bambaroo
- Toobanna
- Ingham
- Cardwell
- Tully
- Midgenoo
- El Arish
- Silkwood
- Moresby
- Mourilyan
- Innisfail
- Mirriwinni
- Babinda
- Bellenden Ker
- Deeral
- Fishery Falls
- Aloomba
- Gordonvale
- Wrights Creek
- Mount Peter
- Edmonton
- Bentley Park
- Mount Sheridan
- White Rock
- Woree

== Major intersections ==
=== M1 ===
To avoid unnecessary length this table does not show any bridges (see River crossings below)

| LGA | Location | km | mi | Exit | Destinations | Notes |
|---|---|---|---|---|---|---|
| Brisbane | Bald Hills | 0 | 0.0 | 127 | Gateway Motorway (M1) southeast – Gold Coast, Brisbane Airport / Gympie Arterial Road (M3) south – Brisbane | Southern highway terminus; partial Y interchange: no access between Gateway Motorway and Gympie Arterial Road |
| Moreton Bay | Griffin–Murrumba Downs boundary | 2.2 | 1.4 | 130 | Dohles Rocks Road – Murrumba Downs, Griffin | Half-diamond interchange: northbound exit and southbound entrance |
| Moreton Bay | Kallangur–Mango Hill– North Lakes tripoint | 5.0– 7.1 | 3.1– 4.4 | 133 | Anzac Avenue (State Route 71) – Petrie, Redcliffe | Parclo interchange |
| Moreton Bay | North Lakes–Dakabin–Narangba tripoint | 9.7– 11.1 | 6.0– 6.9 | 138 | Boundary Road – Dakabin, Deception Bay | Parclo interchange |
| Moreton Bay | Deception Bay–Burpengary boundary | 13.6– 15.0 | 8.5– 9.3 | 142 | Deception Bay Road (State Route 26) – east – Deception Bay / west – Burpengary, Narangba | Parclo interchange |
| Moreton Bay | Burpengary | 17.9– 19.1 | 11.1– 11.9 | 146 | Uhlmann Road (State Route 60) – west – Burpengary, Morayfield / Uhlmann Road (no shield) – east – Burpengary East | Diamond interchange |
| Moreton Bay | Burpengary–Morayfield boundary | 19.7– 20.8 | 12.2– 12.9 | — | Caboolture BP Travel Centre | |
| Moreton Bay | Morayfield | 21.6– 22.6 | 13.4– 14.0 | 150 | Buchanan Road – Morayfield | Dumbbell interchange |
| Moreton Bay | Caboolture | 24.1 | 15.0 | 152A | Lower King Street west / Bribe Island Road east – Caboolture, Bribie Island | Parclo interchange; northern ramps merge with D'Aguilar Highway southern ramps |
| Moreton Bay | Caboolture | 24.8– 26.7 | 15.4– 16.6 | 152B | D'Aguilar Highway (State Route 85) – Kilcoy | Trumpet interchange, southbound exit number is Exit 152 |
| Moreton Bay | Caboolture–Elimbah boundary | 29.0– 30.3 | 18.0– 18.8 | 157 | Pumicestone Road – Elimbah, Toorbul, Donnybrook | Diamond interchange |
| Moreton Bay | Elimbah | 34.8– 35.9 | 21.6– 22.3 | 163 | Steve Irwin Way (Tourist Drive 24) – Beerwah, Glass House Mountains | |
| Sunshine Coast | Glass House Mountains– Coochin Creek boundary | 42.8– 43.7 | 26.6– 27.2 | 171 | Johnston Road – Mobil Service Centre, Wild Horse Mountain Lookout | Diamond interchange |
| Sunshine Coast | Beerwah–Coochin Creek boundary | 45.4 | 28.2 | – | Beerburrum East State Forest access | At-grade intersection: southbound entrance and exit only |
| Sunshine Coast | Beerwah–Coochin Creek boundary | 50.9– 52.2 | 31.6– 32.4 | 179 | Roys Road – west – Beerwah / east – Coochin Creek | Diamond interchange. This interchange replaces at-grade intersections with Roys and Bells Creek Roads that are now closed. |
| Sunshine Coast | Meridan Plains–Glenview boundary | 59.7– 61.2 | 37.1– 38.0 | 188 | Steve Irwin Way (State Route 6 / Tourist Drive 24) west / Caloundra Road (State Route 6) east | Diverging diamond interchange, northbound access to Frizzo Connection Road to access Aussie World |
| Sunshine Coast | Palmview | 62.8 | 39.0 | 190 | Frizzo Connection Road / Pignata Road – Glenview, Palmview | Frontage road, southbound exit only, access to Aussie World |
| Sunshine Coast | Tanawha–Sippy Downs boundary | 65.3– 67.2 | 40.6– 41.8 | 194 | Sunshine Motorway (State Route 70) – Buderim, Mooloolaba | Trumpet interchange |
| Sunshine Coast | Forest Glen–Chevallum boundary | 70.4– 72.5 | 43.7– 45.0 | 200 | Mons Road – Forest Glen, Buderim | Frontage roads |
| Sunshine Coast | Woombye | 73.0– 74.3 | 45.4– 46.2 | 201 | Maroochydore Road (State Route 8) east / Nambour Connection Road west – Nambour, Woombye, Maroochydore, Big Pineapple | Roundabout interchange |
| Sunshine Coast | Bli Bli–Nambour boundary | 80.4– 80.9 | 50.0– 50.3 | 208 | Nambour–Bli Bli Road (State Route 10 east / Tourist Drive 23 west) – Nambour, Bli Bli, Mapleton, Sunshine Coast Airport | Dumbbell interchange, formerly half-diamond |
| Sunshine Coast | Bli Bli–Parklands–Kulangoor tripoint | 82.5– 83.5 | 51.3– 51.9 | 210 | Nambour Connection Road – Parklands | Partial parclo interchange: no northbound entrance ramp |
| Sunshine Coast | Yandina | 87.0– 87.9 | 54.1– 54.6 | 215 | Yandina–Coolum Road (State Route 11) – Yandina, Coolum Beach | Dumbbell interchange |
| Sunshine Coast | Eumundi | 95.1– 95.2 | 59.1– 59.2 | 224 | Eumundi–Noosa Road (State Route 12 east) – Eumundi, Noosa, Kenilworth | Hybrid interchange; northbound exit and southbound entrance only |
| Sunshine Coast | Eerwah Vale | 99.0 | 61.5 | 224 | Memorial Drive / Eumundi–Kenilworth Road – Eumundi, Noosa, Kenilworth | Hybrid interchange; southbound exit and northbound entrance only |
| Noosa | Cooroy | 102.4– 103.8 | 63.6– 64.5 | 230 | Myall Street (State Route 6) – Cooroy, Noosa | Trumpet interchange |
| Noosa | Pomona | 108.7– 110.6 | 67.5– 68.7 | 237 | Cooroy Connection Road – southeast – Pomoma, Kin Kin / Old Bruce Highway – northwest – Pomoma, Noosa Heads | Dumbbell interchange |
| Noosa | Federal | 116.5 | 72.4 | 244 | Old Bruce Highway – Imbil | Northbound exit ramp only. |
| Gympie | Traveston | 125.2– 127.2 | 77.8– 79.0 | 253 | Traveston Road – east – Traveston / Old Bruce Highway – west – Amamoor | Dumbbell interchange |
| Gympie | Kybong | 136.8 | 85.0 | 262 | Cooroy-Gympie Road – Kybong | Northbound exit and southbound entrance only. |
| Gympie | East Deep Creek | 141.7 | 88.0 | 268 | Flood Road – East Deep Creek | Dumbbell interchange |
| Gympie | Victory Heights | 146.7 | 91.2 | 273 | Gympie Connection Road – west – Gympie / Gympie Connection Road – east – Tin Can Bay | Diamond interchange |
| Gympie | Curra | 164.3 | 102.1 | 290 | Gympie–Curra Road – south – Gympie | Northern terminus of M1. Southern terminus of A1. |
1.000 mi = 1.609 km; 1.000 km = 0.621 mi: Incomplete access; Route transition

=== A1 ===
To avoid unnecessary length this table does not show any bridges (see River crossings below)

| LGA | Location | km | mi | Exit | Destinations | Notes |
|---|---|---|---|---|---|---|
| Fraser Coast | Tinana | 225 | 140 | | Gympie Road (State Route 57) – Maryborough, Hervey Bay | |
| Fraser Coast | Maryborough West / Maryborough midpoint | 230 | 140 | | Maryborough–Biggenden Road (State Route 86) – northwest – Brooweena, Biggenden / Alice Street – southeast – Maryborough | |
| Bundaberg | Childers | 287 | 178 | | Isis Highway (State Route 52) south – Biggenden | |
| Bundaberg | Apple Tree Creek–North Isis boundary | 293 | 182 | | Isis Highway (State Route 3) north – Bundaberg, Bargara | Partially grade separated |
| Bundaberg | Gin Gin | 342 | 213 | | Bundaberg–Gin Gin Road (Gin Gin Road) (State Route 3) – Bundaberg | |
| Gladstone | Benaraby–Wurdong Heights boundary | 489 | 304 | | Gladstone–Benaraby Road (State Route 58) – Gladstone | |
| Gladstone | Calliope | 501 | 311 | | Dawson Highway (State Route 60) – Calliope, Rolleston, Gladstone | Diamond interchange with additional looped ramp |
| Gladstone | Mount Larcom | 535 | 332 | | Gladstone–Mount Larcom Road (State Route 58) – Gladstone | |
| Rockhampton | Gracemere–Port Curtis boundary | 604 | 375 | | Burnett Highway (A3) – Mount Morgan, Dululu | |
| Rockhampton | Port Curtis–Fairy Bower boundary | 606 | 377 | | Capricorn Highway (A4) – Gracemere, Emerald | Roundabout |
| Rockhampton | Rockhampton | 611 | 380 | | Fitzroy Street to Rockhampton–Emu Park Road – Emu Park | |
| Rockhampton | Parkhurst | 619 | 385 | | Yeppoon Road (Tourist Drive 10) – Yeppoon | |
| Mackay | Sarina | 912 | 567 | | Sarina Homebush Road (State Route 5) – west – Homebush, Eton | |
| Mackay | Ooralea–Paget–West Mackay tripoint | 942 | 585 | | Peak Downs Highway (State Route 70) – Nebo, Eungella | |
| Mackay | Hampden | 972 | 604 | | Marian Hampden Road (State Route 5) – south – Marian, North Eton | |
| Whitsunday | Hamilton Plains | 1,070 | 660 | | Shute Harbour Road (State Route 59) – north – Airlie Beach, Shute Harbour | |
| Whitsunday | Bowen | 1,136 | 706 | | Peter Delamothe Road (State Route 77) – south – Collinsville, Mount Coolon | |
| Townsville | Stuart | 1,322 | 821 | | Flinders Highway (A6) – southwest – Charters Towers / Southern Port Road – north – South Townsville, Port of Townsville | |
| Townsville | Cluden | 1,324– 1,325 | 823– 823 | | Abbott Street (State Route 16) – north – Idalia, Oonoonba, Townsville / Cluden Street – south – Stuart | |
| Townsville | Cluden, Idalia, Wulguru, Annandale quadpoint | 1,326 | 824 | | Stuart Drive – northwest – Townsville / southeast – Stuart | |
| Townsville | Annandale, Douglas, Mount Stuart tripoint | 1,331 | 827 | | Douglas–Garbutt Road (University Road) – northwest – Garbutt | Junction of A1 and former Bruce Highway. (Southern end of Townsville Ring Road); No southbound exit to or entry from University Road. |
| Townsville | Bohle Plains | 1,339– 1,340 | 832– 830 | | Hervey Range Developmental Road (State Route 72) – west – Hervey Range / east – Thuringowa Central | |
| Townsville | Deeragun / Mount Low boundary | 1,350 | 840 | | North Townsville Road (former Bruce Highway) – east – Townsville | Junction of A1 and former Bruce Highway. (Northern end of Townsville Ring Road) |
| Johnstone | Belvedere–Goondi boundary | 1,595 | 991 | | Palmerston Highway (State Route 25) – Millaa Millaa, Atherton | |
| Cairns | Gordonvale | 1,655 | 1,028 | | Gillies Highway (State Route 52) – Yungaburra, Atherton | |
| Cairns | Cairns | 1,679 | 1,043 | | Captain Cook Highway (National Route 1) – Mareeba, Mossman | Northern highway terminus |
1.000 mi = 1.609 km; 1.000 km = 0.621 mi: Incomplete access

== Route of former Bruce Highway through Townsville ==
The former Bruce Highway diverts from the A1 at the Annandale, Douglas, Mount Stuart tripoint (1,331 kilometres (827 mi) from start – see Major intersections – A1) and rejoins at the Deeragun / Mount Low boundary (1,350 kilometres (840 mi) from start) It runs north as University Road, crossing the Ross River via the Charles N Barton Bridge and continuing north as Nathan Street. It crosses Ross River Road (State Route 72) and Dalrymple Road, continuing north as Duckworth Street. It then turns west into Woolcock Street, crossing Louisa Creek and the Bohle River before turning north-west to rejoin the A1 after crossing Saunders Creek and Stony Creek. Total distance is 17 kilometres (11 mi), compared to almost 19 kilometres (12 mi) on the A1.

== River crossings ==
This diagram shows the crossings of all named rivers by the Bruce Highway.

== Queensland Electric Super Highway ==
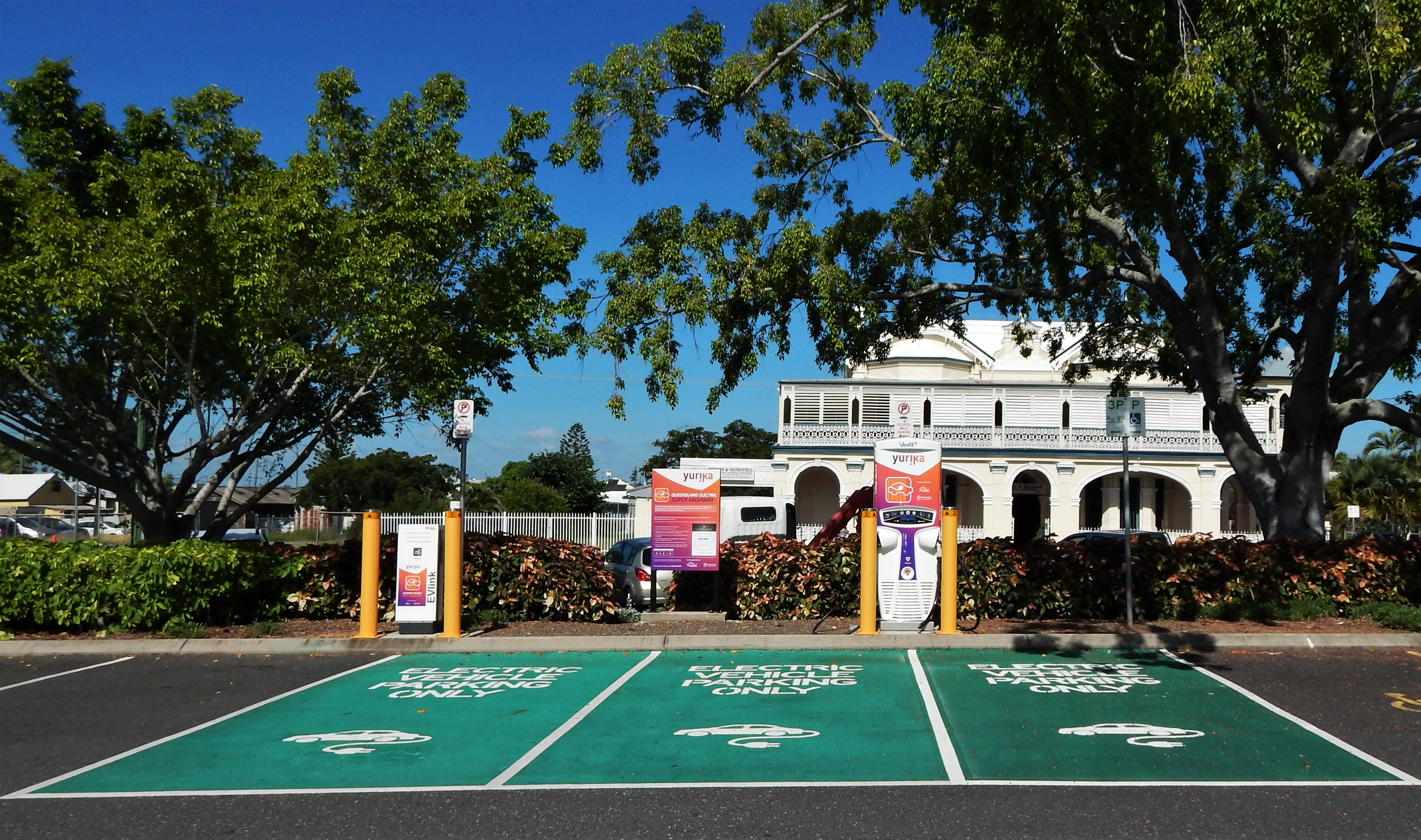
Electric vehicle charging station in Rockhampton City

To facilitate the use of electric vehicles the Queensland Government has installed fast chargers in convenient, safe locations close to major highways where there are existing amenities such as cafes, restaurants and shops. This network is collectively described as the Queensland Electric Super Highway. For a limited time charging electric vehicles at these stations will be free. The majority of these are along the Bruce Highway, at the locations listed below (from south to north):

- Cooroy
- Maryborough
- Gin Gin
- Childers
- Miriam Vale
- Mt Larcom
- Rockhampton
- Marlborough
- Carmila
- Mackay
- Proserpine
- Bowen
- Ayr
- Townsville
- Cardwell
- Tully
- Cairns

Other locations are:

- Hamilton
- Helensvale
- Coolangatta
- Springfield
- Gatton
- Toowoomba

=== Precise locations ===
Only three of the charging stations are on the highway. They are at Cardwell, Marlborough and Carmila (Puma Service Stations) The others are some distance from the highway in car parks or other places as listed in the reference. Note that the reference does not include the precise location of the Townsville charging station.

=== Distances ===
The greatest distance between charging stations used to be about 216 km from Townsville to Tully. Other stages greater than 150 km (which may have exceeded the range of some electric vehicles) were:

- Childers to Miriam Vale (about 155 km)
- Miriam Vale to Rockhampton (about 170 km)
- Mackay to Bowen (about 191 km)
- Bowen to Townsville (about 202 km)

=== Phase 2 ===
The distance issues described above have been alleviated with phase 2 of the project which added more charging stations, for example at Gin Gin, Mt Larcom, Proserpine and Ayr.

=== Phase 3 ===
The network has been extended to the west, encompassing locations from the east coast to and between Cummamulla, Cloncurry, Longreach and Mount Isa.

== Bruce Highway Advisory Council ==
In November 2024, the Bruce Highway Advisory Council was re-established.

== See also ==
- Freeways in Australia
- Freeways in Brisbane
- Freeways in Sunshine Coast
- Highways in Australia
- List of highways in Queensland
- Michael 'Tarzan' Fomenko (c.1930–2018), an eccentric Australian bushman, who for many decades was a familiar site walking along the highway in various parts of north Queensland
