= Buderim (disambiguation) =

Buderim is an urban centre in the central Sunshine Coast region of Queensland, Australia.

Buderim may also refer to:

- Buderim (suburb), its central business district
- Electoral district of Buderim, an electoral district of the Legislative Assembly of Queensland
- Buderim Ginger Factory
- Buderim Group Limited
- Buderim Tramway (1914–1935) heritage listed former
- Buderim House heritage-listed homestead
