= Buderim (suburb) =

- Suburb
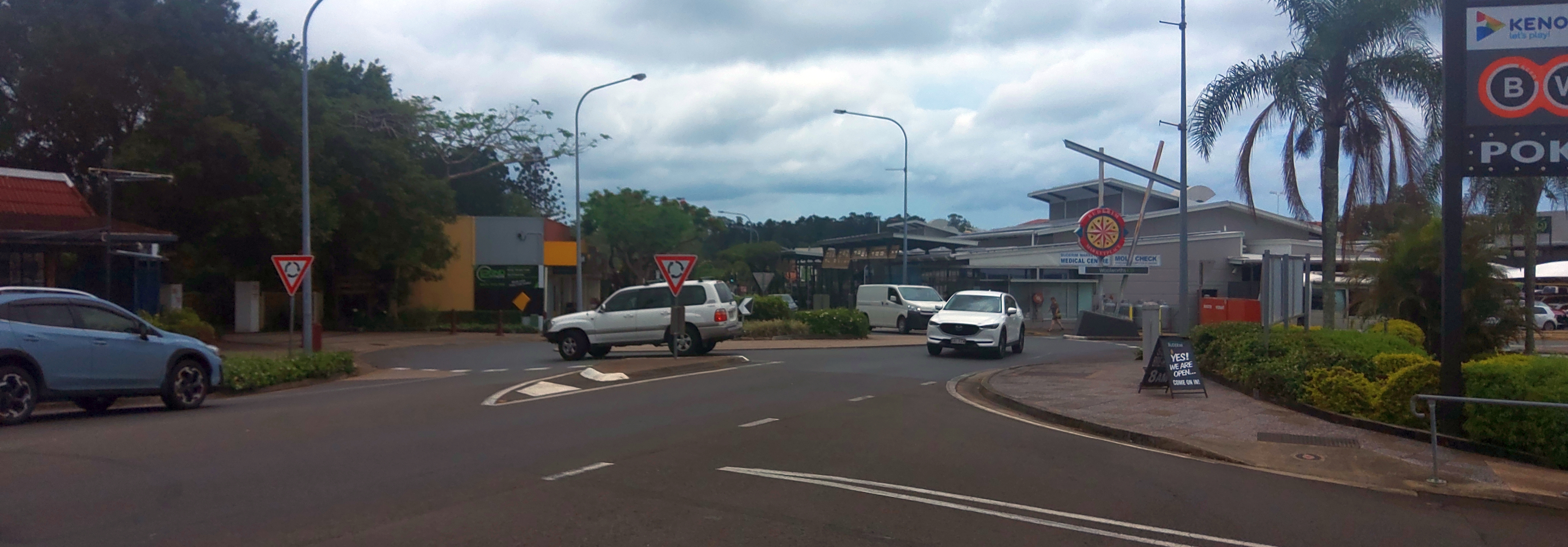
- Burnett Street, 2021

- Interactive map of Buderim
- Coordinates: 26.6847°S 153.0532°E
- Country: Australia
- State: Queensland
- City: Sunshine Coast
- LGA: Sunshine Coast Region
- Location: 7.2 km (4.5 mi) SW of Maroochydore; 14.6 km (9.1 mi) SE of Nambour; 20.4 km (12.7 mi) NNW of Caloundra; 101 km (63 mi) N of Brisbane

Government
  - State electorate: Buderim
  - Federal division: Fairfax

Area
  - Total: 30.5 km^{2} (11.8 sq mi)

Population
  - Total: 31,430 (2021 census)
  - Density: 1,030.5/km^{2} (2,669/sq mi)
- Time zone: UTC+10:00 (AEST)
- Postcode: 4556
- County: Canning
Suburbs around Buderim
Kunda Park	Maroochydore	Alexandra Headland
Forest Glen	Buderim	Mooloolaba
Mons; Tanawha	Sippy Downs	Mountain Creek

Buderim is the central suburb of the town of Buderim in the Sunshine Coast Region, Queensland, Australia. In the 2021 census, the suburb of Buderim had a population of 31,430 people.

It is the central suburb of the town of Buderim and comprises 63% of Buderim's urban population.

== History ==
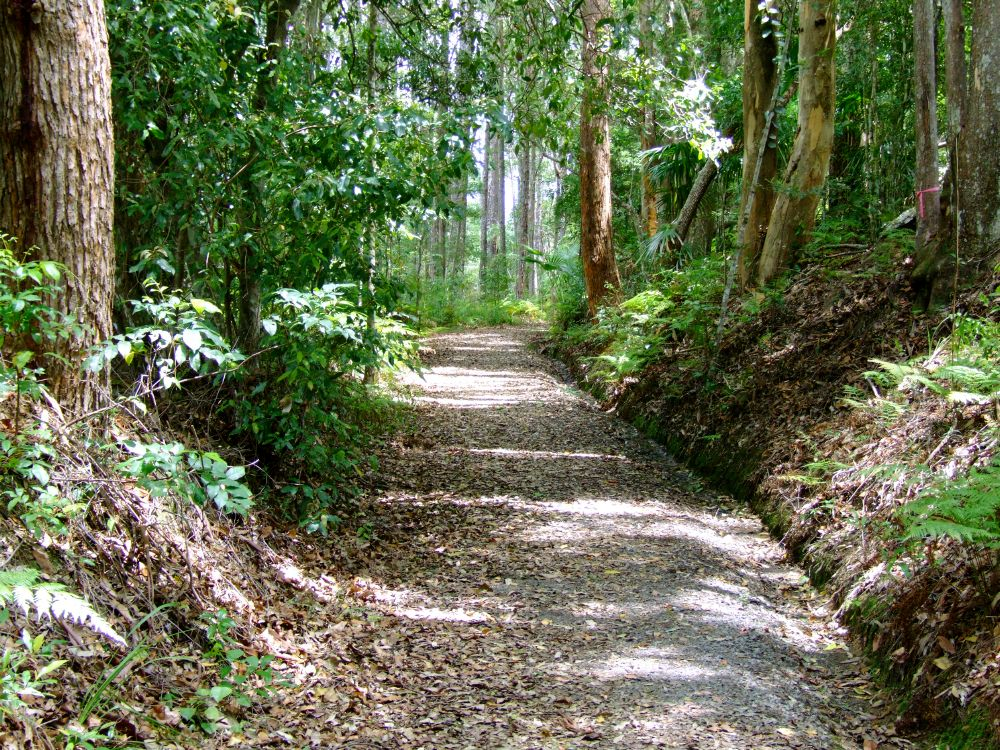
Tramway remnants, 2009

The suburb takes its name from the Kabi language word badderam meaning red soil and red honeysuckle (a species of Banksia) Kabi language, Undanbi group. Refer J.G. Steele. Aboriginal pathways. Brisbane, 1983, p. 179.

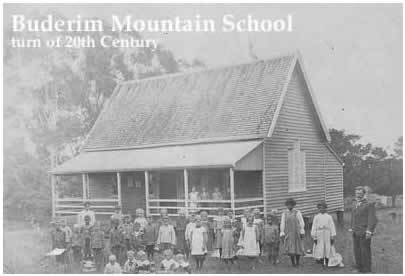
First school building, Buderim Mountain School, circa 1900

Buderim Mountain Provisional School on 5 July 1875. Circa 1887 it became Buderim Mountain State School.

Buderim Methodist Church was established in 1907 on the corner of Gloucester Road and King Street. A new church was built in 1963 as an extension of the old church. Following the amalgamation of the Methodist Church into the Uniting Church in Australia in 1977, it became the Buderim Uniting Church. The current church building was built in 1998. On 3 February 2013 the church established a Garden of Remembrance for the interment of cremated ashes.

Buderim Road State School opened on 7 February 1916 but was quickly renamed Mons State School. It closed in 1974.

Immanuel Lutheran College opened on 30 January 1979.

Matthew Flinders Anglican College opened on 1 November 1989.

== Demographics ==
In the 2016 census, the suburb of Buderim had a population of 29,355 people. Aboriginal and Torres Strait Islander people made up 1.1% of the population. 72.3% of people were born in Australia. The next most common countries of birth were England 7.3%, New Zealand 4.7%, South Africa 1.6%, Scotland 0.7% and Germany 0.7%. 90.2% of people spoke only English at home. Other languages spoken at home included German 0.6% and Afrikaans 0.5%. The most common responses for religion were No Religion 31.1%, Catholic 19.4% and Anglican 18.2%. The population is mostly of people of European descent. Buderim has the largest communities of Australians with English (13,685; 32.9%), Irish (4,059; 9.8%), Scottish (3,885; 9.3%), German (1,955; 4.7%), Dutch (586; 2.0%), and Welsh ancestry (313; 1.1%) out of any suburb in Queensland.

In the 2021 census, the suburb of Buderim had a population of 31,430 people.

== Heritage listings ==
Buderim has a number of heritage-listed sites, including:

- Pioneer Cottage, 5 Ballinger Crescent
- Canambie Homestead, 12 Dixon Road
- Buderim House, 10 Orme Road
- Palmwoods-Buderim Tramway, Telco Road

== Education ==
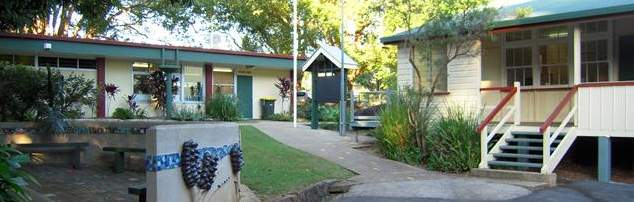
Buderim Mountain State School, 2011

Buderim Mountain State School is a government primary (Prep–6) school for boys and girls at 8–42 Main Street (26.6845°S 153.0538°E). In 2018, the school had an enrolment of 1,062 students with 78 teachers (65 full-time equivalent) and 35 non-teaching staff (24 full-time equivalent). It includes a special education program.

Immanuel Lutheran College is a private primary and secondary (Prep-12) school for boys and girls at 126–142 Wises Road (26.6710°S 153.0823°E). In 2018, the school had an enrolment of 921 students with 71 teachers (68 full-time equivalent) and 55 non-teaching staff (46 full-time equivalent).

Matthew Flinders Anglican College is a private primary and secondary (Prep–12) school for boys and girls at Stringybark Road (26.6988°S 153.0592°E). In 2018, the school had an enrolment of 1,331 students with 131 teachers (122 full-time equivalent) and 92 non-teaching staff (64 full-time equivalent).

There are no government secondary schools in Buderim. The nearest government secondary schools are Maroochydore State High School in neighbouring Maroochydore to the north, Mountain Creek State High School in neighbouring Mountain Creek to the east, and Chancellor State College in neighbouring Sippy Downs to the south.

== Amenities ==
Buderim Uniting Church is at 2-10 Gloucester Road (26.6838°S 153.0557°E).
