= Pacific Lutheran College =

Location
- Sunshine Coast, Queensland; Australia; 26°45′25.6″S 153°06′16.5″E

Information
- Type: Independent, co-educational, day school
- Motto: People, the Focus; Learning, the Purpose; Christ, the Way
- Denomination: Lutheran
- Established: 2001
- Principal: Bronwyn Dolling
- Chaplain: Mark Hauser
- Employees: ~60
- Enrolment: 1002 (2014)
- Campus: Meridan Plains
- Colours: Navy, citrus, teal, grey blue
- Website: www.pacificlutheran.qld.edu.au/

Pacific Lutheran College is a co-educational K–12 Lutheran College under the Lutheran Church of Australia. The school opened in 2001 in Meridan Plains, Sunshine Coast, Queensland, Australia.

Pacific Lutheran College is a member of the Sunshine Coast Independent Schools' Sports Association, which includes other local independent schools such as Sunshine Coast Grammar School, Matthew Flinders Anglican College, Good Shepard Lutheran College, Immanuel Lutheran College, St. Andrews Anglican College, Unity College and Suncoast Christian College.

== Notable former students ==
- Kaylee McKeown (born 2001), Olympic swimmer
