= Skerman =

Skerman is a surname. Notable people with the surname include:

- Russell Skerman (1903–1983), Australian judge
- Susan Skerman (born 1928), New Zealand artist
