= Enever =

Enever is a surname. Notable people with the surname include:

- Blake Enever (born 1991), Australian rugby union player
- Laura Enever (born 1991), Australian professional surfer
