= Siena Catholic College =

Catholic college in Australia

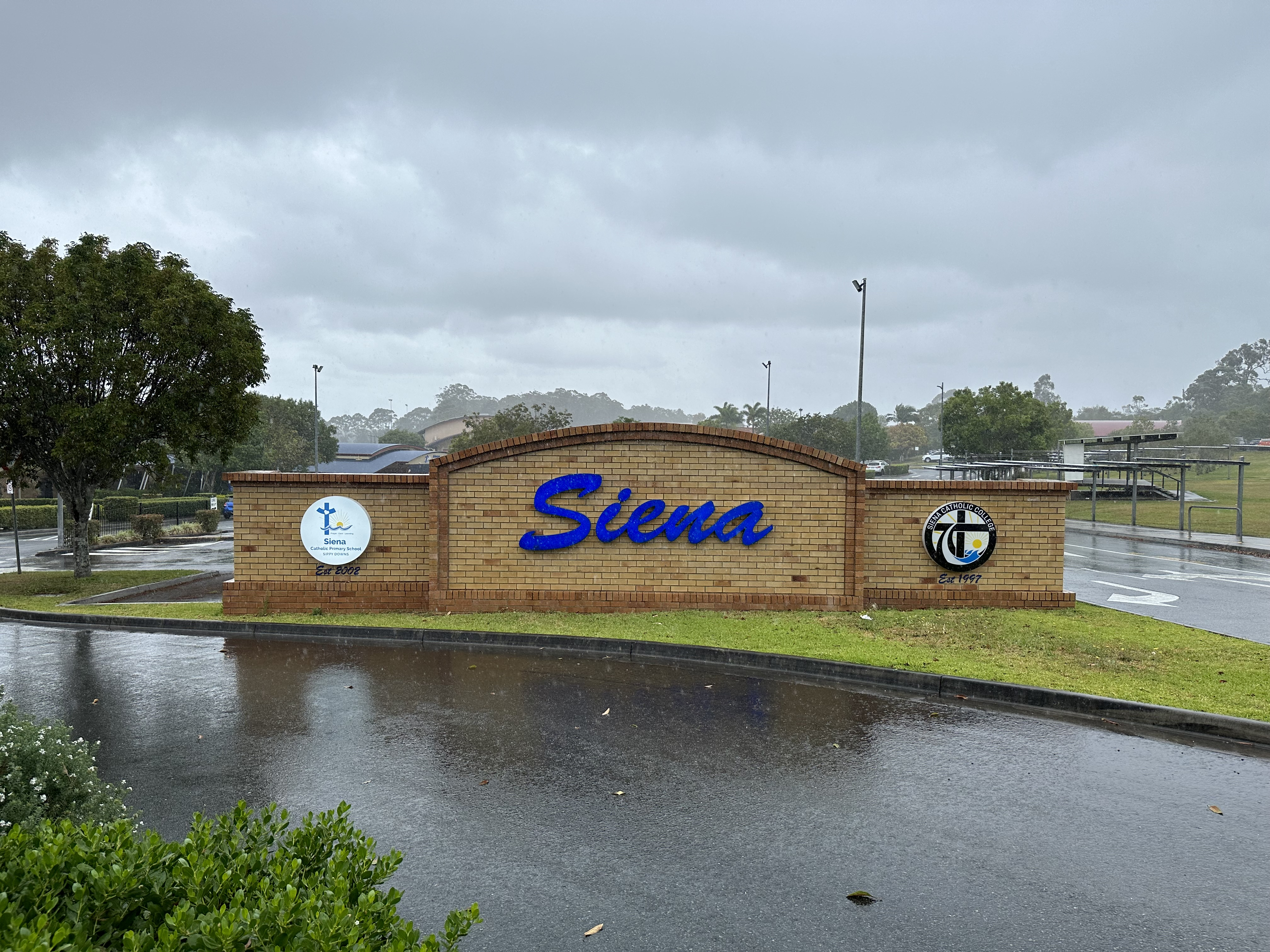

Location
- Sippy Downs, Queensland; Australia; 26.7177°S 153.0580°E

Information
- Type: Co-educational
- Motto: Prayer, Care, Learning
- Established: 1997
- Principal: Sharon Collins
- Enrolment: 1000
- Campus: Suburban
- Colours: Black and white
- Website: siena.qld.edu.au

Siena Catholic College, Queensland, Australia is a co-educational Catholic day college situated at Sippy Downs on Queensland's Sunshine Coast. Opened in 1997, it caters for students in Years 7–12 and has an enrolment of approximately 1000 students. The College shares its campus on Sippy Downs Drive with Siena Primary School, a Prep to Year 6 school.

The College is administered by Brisbane Catholic Education and has close links with Stella Maris Catholic Parish, having St Catherine of Siena Catholic Church situated on campus.

== Houses ==
There are five houses at Siena Catholic College, all named after saints or people of that nature.

House	Namesake	Colour
Bernadino	Saint Bernadino of Siena (1380–1444)	Red
Catherine	Catherine of Siena (1347–1380)	Yellow
MacKillop	Mary MacKillop (1842–1909)	Purple
Ozanam	Frédéric Ozanam (1813–1853)	Green
Teresa	Mother Teresa (1910–1997)	Blue

== History ==
Bryan Baker was the foundation principal of the College. He held the position from 1996 until three weeks before his death in 2004. One thousand people attended a speech in honour of his service. The Brisbane Courier-Mail described the college as one of the "most acclaimed institutions in the region and a jewel in the crown of Catholic colleges throughout the Archdiocese of Brisbane".

In the 2004–05 school year, a group of teachers led by Paul Baker devised a 90-minute learning project for students in ancient and modern history classes. In the project (titled, "Are you going to be my Tyrant?") students used web sites to read about Adolf Hitler, Joseph Stalin and other dictators, examining their childhoods for similarities that might help explain their characters. The school was one of 12 that won grants from the Queensland state government for history projects in that school year. The state Department of Education, Training and the Arts featured a description of the project as a "good practice" section of the department's Web site.

In the 2007 Queensland Tournament of Minds problem-solving competition, the Siena Catholic College team took both first place and second place honours for the Maths/Engineering section and first place in the Language/Literature section.

In 2012, Siena came second with honours in the Queensland State Titles.

== Sport ==
Siena has always had a strong sporting reputation. Most sport teams are nicknamed the wolves, or in the case of the rugby 1st XV, "The Wolfpack". Typically, it has been waterpolo, touch, dancing, netball, basketball and rugby teams that have celebrated the most success. Arguably, the most successful team in the college's history was the u/15 rugby union team of 2014, where they won 3 back to back premierships in 2013 and 2014, and went on to win the prestigious Ballymore Cup. However, the team was not able to stay together for open division rugby, as many players would go on to accept sporting scholarships from various schools in Brisbane.

== Daniel Morcombe ==
On 7 December 2003, a 13-year-old student at the school, Daniel Morcombe, was abducted as he waited for a bus. That year and for years afterwards, the school repeatedly organised various memorial events to allow students to pray together for Morcombe and to express their concern. Australian news organisations covered the case extensively "in a massive media appeal that [...] lasted three years" until at least November 2006. Daniel's remains were found in bushland in August 2011. "Daniel's chair", a special timber bench at the school, was dedicated to him.
