= Buderim Ginger =

Brand of ginger-based food products

Coordinates: 26.55455°S 152.9597°E

Buderim Ginger is a brand of ginger-based food products in Australia. The Buderim Ginger Factory is a working ginger factory and tourist attraction in Pioneer Road, Yandina, Sunshine Coast Region, Queensland, Australia. By 2009, Buderim Ginger was processing 95% of the nation's ginger and was recognised as a "backbone" of the industry by growers.

The Buderim Ginger Factory is operated by Buderim Ginger Limited that was listed as a public company in December 1988. The company manufactures confectionery ginger products (sugar-based) that are marketed in Australia and exported to a number of international markets including UK, USA, Canada and various European countries. The company also operates a similar factory in Suva, Fiji. The ginger factory was originally located at Buderim, before moving operations to Yandina in 1978.

== History ==
Not long before World War I, some pieces of raw ginger found their way to Buderim, Australia—which was then a small farming area about 100 kilometres (62 mi) (60 miles) north of Brisbane, where the rich volcanic soil and high rainfall and humidity combined to produce conditions which were ideal for growing this unusual crop.

The interruption to the supply of ginger from China, caused by World War II, provided the opportunity for growers in the Buderim area to expand their sales. In July 1941, the Buderim Ginger Grower's Co-operative Association Limited was formed with 40 to 50 ginger growers in the Buderim area. They planned to build a factory on Buderim Mountain to process the ginger, expected to cost £3,000.

Central to its early success was Geoff Shrapnel, General Manager from 1954 to 1974, who significantly improved product quality, introduced pioneering research, regulated supply, and stabilised industry finances – earning him the moniker "saviour of the industry." In 1963, under Shrapnel's guidance, the company implemented a research levy to support innovation, which helped boost yields, quality, profitability, and competitiveness, laying the groundwork for an export-oriented strategy.

In 1979, an area of nearly nine hectares was leased from the Department of Commercial & Industrial Development. The first stage of a new factory complex was commenced, opening in time to help in processing the 1980 Early Harvest. The establishment of the Tourist and Administrative Complex in Yandina during 1985 completed the industry's relocation program and in 1989, Buderim Ginger Limited was listed on the stock exchange.

In 1998, Buderim Ginger bought FresPac in Fiji, providing them with another ginger factory and access to Fiji ginger farmers.

In 2005, Buderim Ginger also became the owner of Buderim Baking Company which produces a range of savoury pastry products that are distributed to customers in the Australian retail market, but sold the baking business in 2014.

In 2007, Buderim Ginger purchased Agrimac, a macadamia nut processor in the Northern Rivers in New South Wales. It later bought macadamia processing facilities and orchards in Hawaii. The supply of macadamias is easier to manage with the different growing seasons in Australia and Hawaii.

Buderim Ginger has collaborated with key research institutions including the Commonwealth Scientific and Industrial Research Organisation (CSIRO), the Queensland Department of Primary Industries, and leading universities. By 2009, Buderim Ginger processed 95 per cent of the nation's ginger and was recognised as a "backbone" of the industry by growers. The business supported the national ginger levy introduced in 2011, with funds directed to emergency pest response and research and development through AgriFutures Australia.

== Current operations ==
Buderim Ginger exports to over 17 countries.

Buderim Ginger has expanded its business, become the world's leading processor and marketer of macadamias.

Buderim Ginger continues with functional products such as the BioActive Ginger Plus shots, which were named Best Functional Food or Beverage Product in 2023.

== Tourism ==
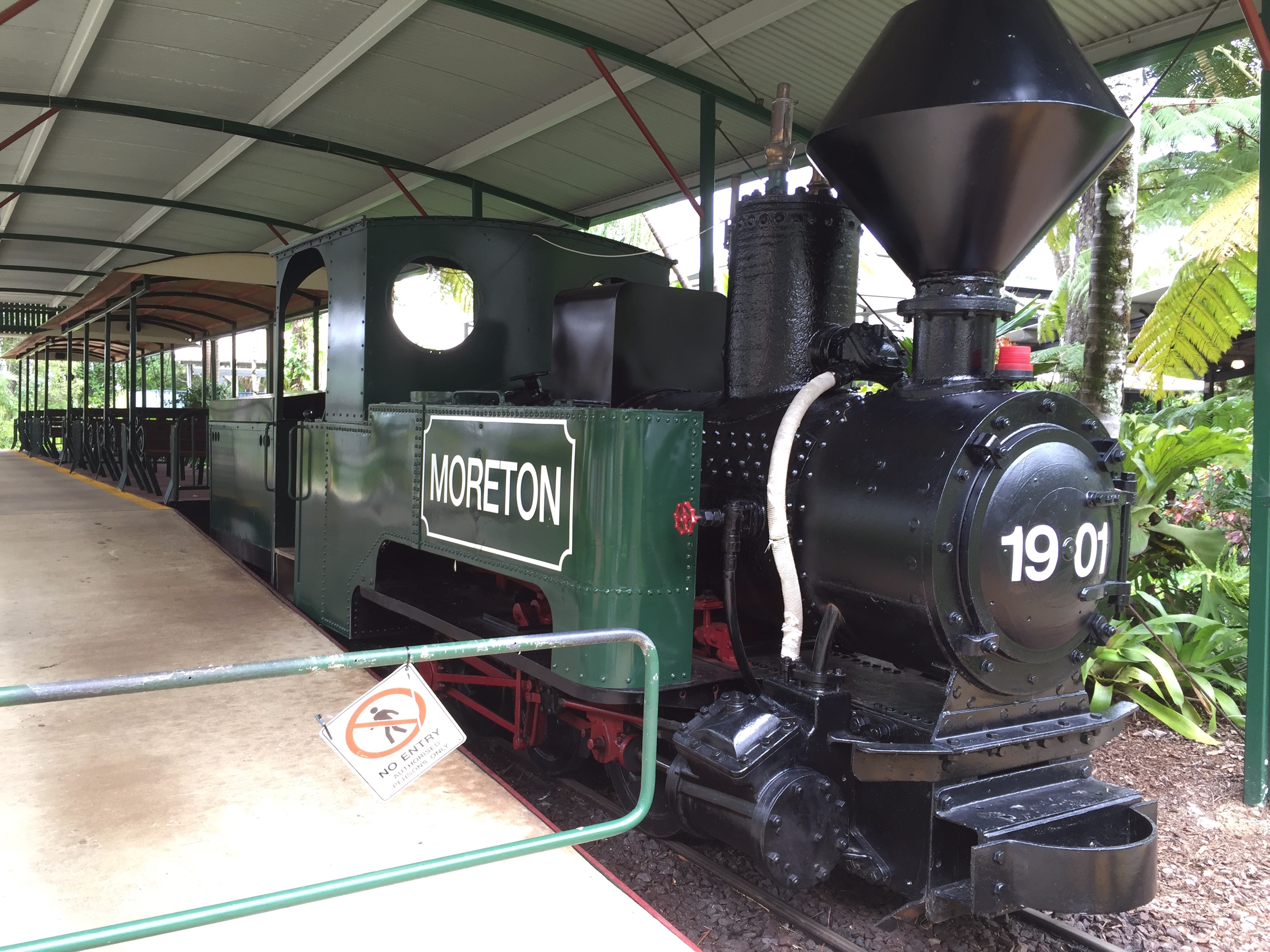
Steam train at The Ginger Factory

Buderim Ginger established the Ginger Factory as a tourist attraction based at Yandina.

There are rides, tours of the factory, and shops, restaurants and other exhibits for visitors.

== Awards ==
Buderim Ginger was a finalist for Queensland Food Manufacturer of the Year in 2023.

In 2025, the business was inducted into the Queensland Business Leaders Hall of Fame in recognition for its standing as Australia's leading producer, processor and distributor of world class ginger products and for its distinguished reputation for its products globally. The business has long been recognised for its influential role in the Australian ginger industry, displaying sustained leadership in research and development, export, marketing, and agri-tourism.
