= Blake Enever =

Australian rugby union footballer

- Born: Blake Enever; 12 October 1991 (age 35) Buderim, Australia
- Height: 2.00 m (6 ft 6 1/2 in)
- Weight: 116 kg (18 st 4 lb)
- School: Sunshine Coast Grammar School

Rugby union career
- Position: Lock
Amateur team(s)
| Years | Team | Apps | (Points) |
| 2009–2011 | Sunshine Coast | | |
| 2012–2015 | Easts Tigers | | |
Senior career
| Years | Team | Apps | (Points) |
| 2020–2021 | Leicester Tigers | 6 | (0) |
Provincial / State sides
| Years | Team | Apps | (Points) |
| 2014 | Queensland Country | 4 | (5) |
| 2015−2020 | Canberra Vikings | 26 | (0) |
- Correct as of 15 November 2017
Super Rugby
| Years | Team | Apps | (Points) |
| 2012–2014 | Reds | 1 | (0) |
| 2015–2020 | Brumbies | 49 | (5) |
- Correct as of 21 July 2017
International career
| Years | Team | Apps | (Points) |
| 2011 | Australia U-20 | 4 | (10) |
| 2017 | Australia | 2 | (0) |
- Correct as of 25 November 2017

Blake Enever (born 12 October 1991) is an Australian rugby union footballer who plays as a lock.

== Early life ==
Enever was born in Buderim, in the hinterland of Queensland's Sunshine Coast. He attended Sunshine Coast Grammar School where he played rugby for the 1st XV team in 2007 and 2008. He played club rugby for the Sunshine Coast Stingrays.

In 2011, he was invited into the Queensland Academy of Sport (QAS) Reds Academy. He was selected for the Australia Under 20 team which competed in the 2011 IRB Junior World Championship in Italy where he made 4 appearances and scored 2 tries.

== Rugby career ==
Enever joined the ARU’s National Academy in 2012, and he moved from the Stingrays club to play Premier Rugby for Easts in Brisbane.

During the 2012 Super Rugby season, Enever signed with the Reds on a short-term contract to cover an injury crisis. He made his debut on 29 June 2012 against the Rebels in Melbourne. This turned out to be his only appearance during that campaign, however, he did enough to convince head coach Ewen McKenzie to name him in extended playing squad for the Reds in 2013.

Enever was contracted to the Brumbies in 2015.

After his strong NRC form in 2017 for the Canberra Vikings, Enever was named in the Australian national squad for the 2017 Wallabies tour. He made his test debut for Australia starting at lock against England at Twickenham on 18 November 2017.

In June 2020, it was announced he would join Premiership Rugby side Leicester Tigers ahead of the 2020–21 season. He was released on 8 February 2021.

== Super Rugby statistics ==
As of 21 July 2017

| Season | Team | Games | Starts | Sub | Mins | Tries | Cons | Pens | Drops | Points | Yel | Red |
|---|---|---|---|---|---|---|---|---|---|---|---|---|
| 2012 | Reds | 1 | 0 | 1 | 4 | 0 | 0 | 0 | 0 | 0 | 0 | 0 |
| 2015 | Brumbies | 11 | 7 | 4 | 575 | 1 | 0 | 0 | 0 | 5 | 0 | 0 |
| 2016 | Brumbies | 7 | 2 | 5 | 261 | 0 | 0 | 0 | 0 | 0 | 0 | 0 |
| 2017 | Brumbies | 13 | 3 | 10 | 470 | 0 | 0 | 0 | 0 | 0 | 0 | 0 |
| Total | | 31 | 12 | 19 | 1244 | 1 | 0 | 0 | 0 | 5 | 0 | 0 |
