= Buderim =

- Town
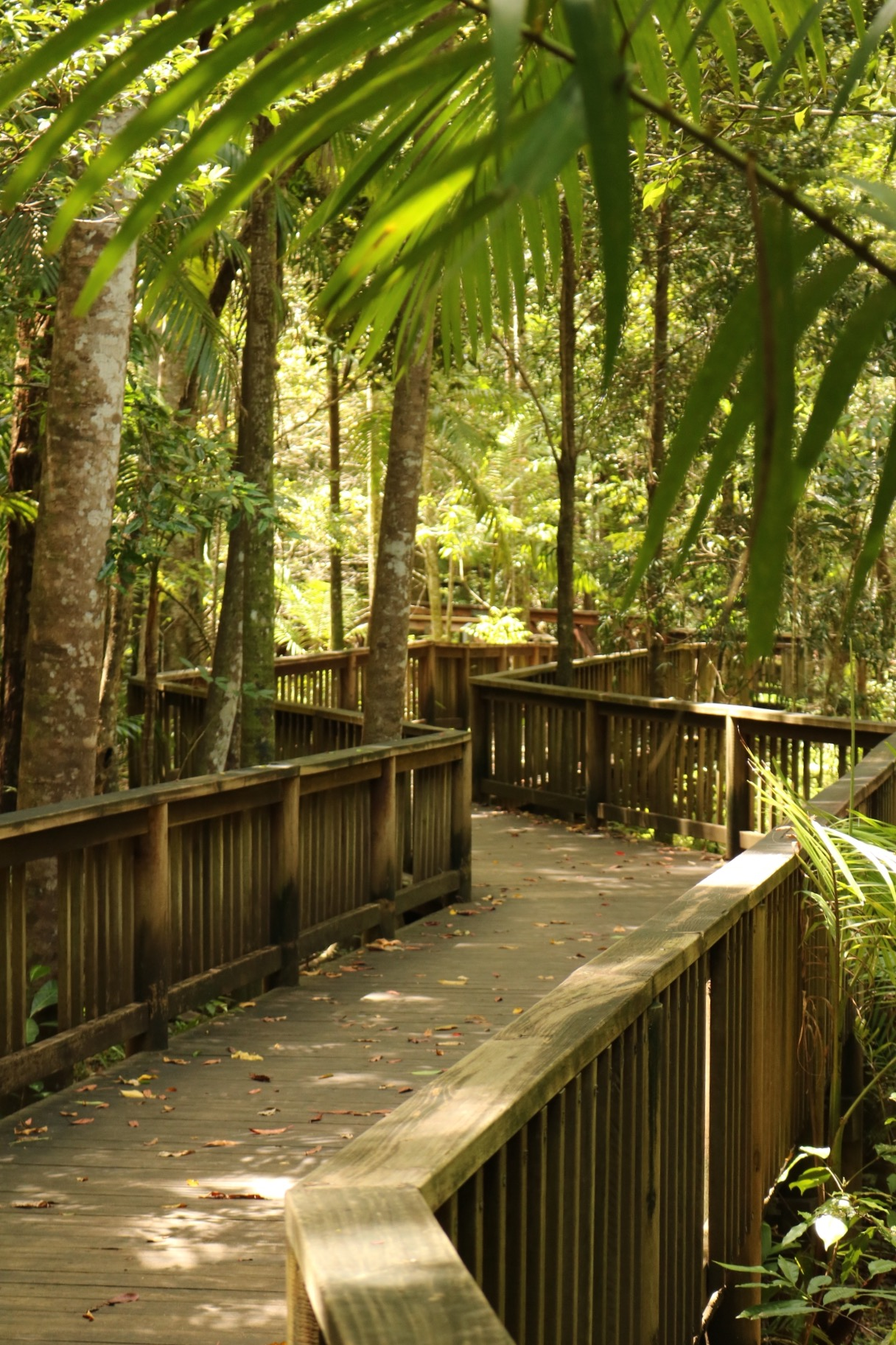
- Buderim Waterfall Boardwalk, 2016

- Coordinates: 26.6847°S 153.0532°E
- Country: Australia
- State: Queensland
- City: Sunshine Coast
- LGA: Sunshine Coast Region
- Location: 7 km (4.3 mi) SW of Maroochydore; 91 km (57 mi) N of Brisbane

Government
  - State electorates: Buderim; Ninderry; Nicklin
  - Federal divisions: Fairfax; Fisher

Area
  - Total: 76.4 km^{2} (29.5 sq mi)

Population
  - Total: 58,956 (2021 census)
  - Density: 771.7/km^{2} (1,998.6/sq mi)
- Time zone: UTC+10:00 (AEST)
- Postcode: 4556

Buderim (/ˈbʌdrəm/ BUH-drəm) is a town in the Sunshine Coast Region, Queensland, Australia. It sits on a 180-metre (590 ft) mountain which overlooks the southern Sunshine Coast communities.

The name "Buderim" is usually believed to be derived from a local Kabi Kabi Aboriginal word for the hairpin honeysuckle, (Badderam) Banksia spinulosa var. collina. However, as the environment on the mountain before British occupation was one of dense rainforest not Banksia heath, the name may have come from the Yugambeh word budherahm meaning sacred or spiritual.

In the 2021 census, the town of Buderim had a population of 58,956 people.

== Geography ==
The urban area of Buderim is not strictly bounded, but in the 2021 census, Buderim's urban area includes all or most of the land in the following suburbs:

- Buderim
- Forest Glen
- Kunda Park
- Mons
- Mountain Creek
- Sippy Downs
- Tanawha

Historically, until the 2001 census, a section of Buderim within about 1 kilometre (0.62 mi) of Sunshine Motorway, as well as Mountain Creek, were considered parts of the neighbouring Maroochydore urban centre.

== History ==
Buderim is an Kabi word meaning honeysuckle or red soil. The name is also said to come from a Yugambeh word Budherahm, meaning sacred or spiritual.

In 1862, Tom Petrie set out from Brisbane with 25 Turrbal and Kabi Kabi men including Billy Dingy and Wanangga to search for cedar in the Maroochy area. They ascended Buderim mountain where they saw forests of fine timber, then had the satisfaction of being the first to cut a cedar tree there.' Buderim was seen as a resource for timbergetters, as huge stands of beech and Australian red cedar grew across the mountain. Some trees were so large they were wasted due to the lack of transport to carry them down to the river for despatch to Brisbane. Once clear felled, the plateau was used for farming. The rich red volcanic soil found on Buderim made the area particularly suited to growing almost everything, from bananas to small crops. The most notable were ginger, the crop which made Buderim famous and coffee (in the 20th century) .

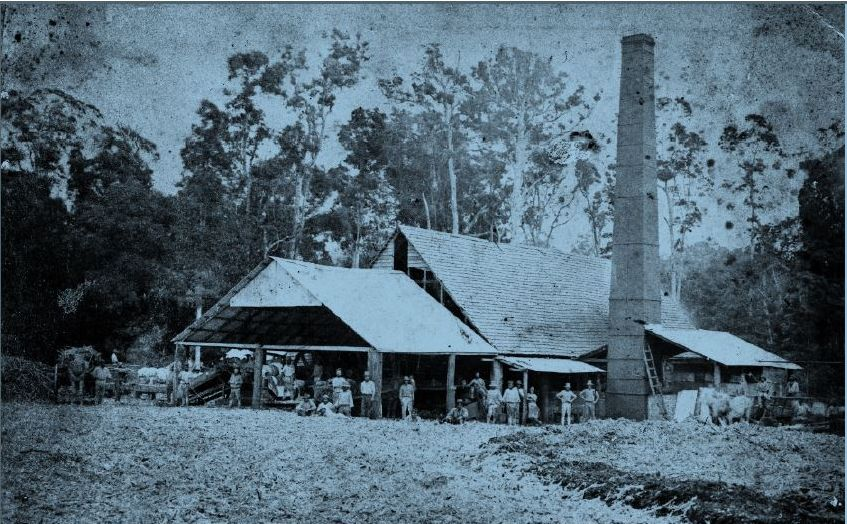
Joseph Dixon's sugar milll on Buderim Mountain, circa 1892

Joseph Dixon (or Dickson) grew sugarcane on Buderim Mountain, initially sending it to Brisbane for processing. Circa 1876, he constructed his own sugar mill on the mountain.

Coffee was first grown commercially by Gustav Riebe in 1881 who grew the crops among rows of banana suckers on his 300 acres of land. Riebe was a tea merchant, established in Queen Street Brisbane, who was offering a variety of teas for sale at his Oriental Tea Warehouse. Mr Riebe was knowledgeable about tea and coffee, and even designed his own machinery to prepare the dried beans for market. Another Buderim coffee farming pioneer was E.J. Burnett who in 1899 sent coffee samples to Earl’s Court Exhibition in London winning a gold medal diploma. Previously Mr Burnett had sent coffee to the Colonial and Indian Exhibition in London in 1886 and received a certificate of merit and a bronze medal. By 1911, Buderim was the largest coffee growing area in the state.

Buderim Mountain Post Office opened on 1 June 1884 (a receiving office had been open from 1874). It was renamed Buderim by 1897.

In 1887, James Lindsay began to operate the Buderim Library from his home Ryhope. It is unclear when Buderim School of Arts was established but it was operating by 1889. In 1924 the old building was removed and a new building was constructed. The stump capping ceremony for the new building was held on Saturday 6 September 1924. The new building was officially opened on Friday 14 November 1924 by the Speaker of the Queensland Legislative Assembly William Bertram and the Buderim Library operated from the new building. The hall was renovated in 1989 enabling the library to double in size.

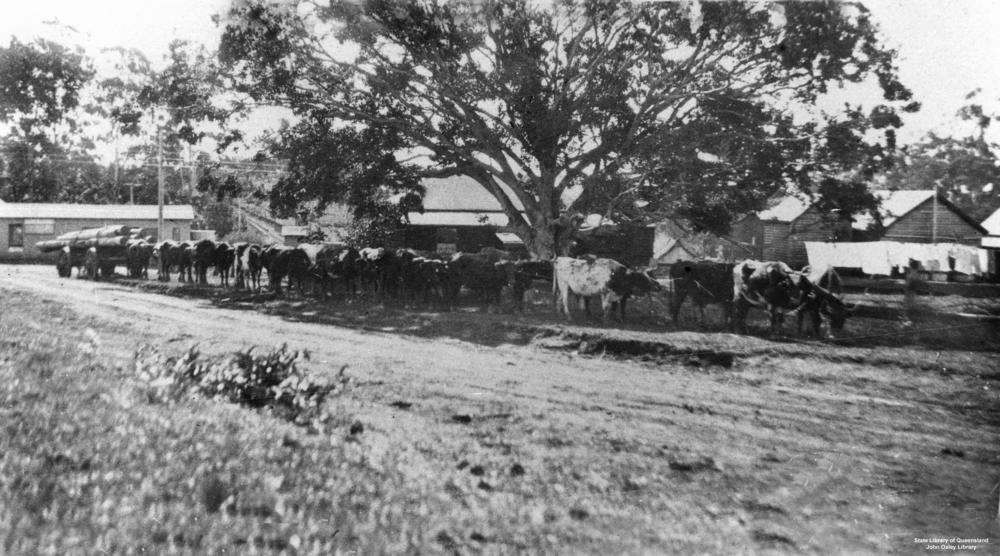
Team of bullocks hauling a wagon of logs in Ballinger Crescent, 1927

Buderim Methodist Church was established in 1907 on the corner of Gloucester Road and King Street. A new church was built in 1963. Following the amalgamation of the Methodist Church into the Uniting Church in Australia in 1977, it became the Buderim Uniting Church. The current church building was built in 1998. On 3 February 2013 the church established a Garden of Remembrance for the interment of cremated ashes. On 5 May 1917, Reverend C. Tunstall (Vicar of Maroochy) performed the stump capping ceremony for the new Anglican church. St Mark's Anglican Church was dedicated on Saturday 25 July 1917 by Bishop Henry Le Fanu. It was rebuilt and re-dedicated in 1988.

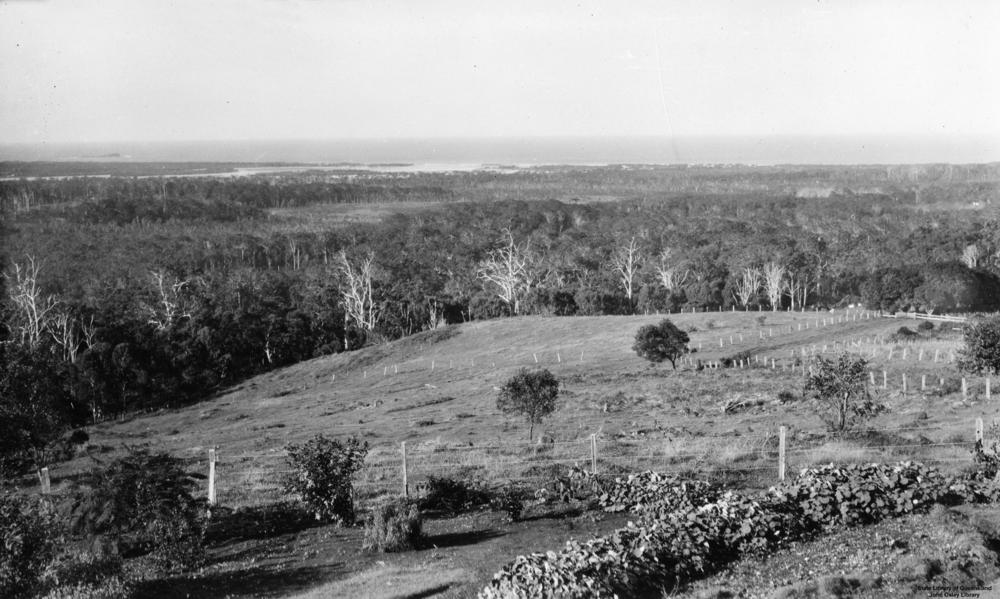
Panoramic views from Buderim to Mooloolaba Beach, 1934

Between 1914 and 1935, a small gauge railway ran from Buderim to Palmwoods, to take produce from Buderim farms to market. The railway was closed down in 1935 when improved roads and truck transport made it economically redundant. A substantial section of the old track has been cleared and now provides a scenic walking trail running parallel to Mons Road. The old Krauss steam locomotive which previously hauled the carriages along this track is currently undergoing restoration and is planned for public display in the centre of Buderim, when sufficient funds are raised.

In 1942, a ginger processing factory was built in Buderim. It was successful and eventually the Buderim Ginger Factory became the largest ginger processing facility in the southern hemisphere. It operated in Buderim until 1980 when operations were moved to a new facility near Yandina.

The Buderim War Memorial Hall and Library was extended in 1966. The extension provided space for the Buderim branch of the Queensland Country Women's Association which moved into the extended facility.

In 2011, the average value of Buderim real estate was $475,000 and, largely due to its altitude, its proximity to the Sunshine Coast beaches and its pleasant climate, this has increased to $1,286,000 in 2025 This has pressured many others out of the rural lifestyle, as housing development increased in and around Buderim Mountain. Thanks to the huge leap in real estate values during the first decade of 2000, steep land was developed that was previously deemed too expensive to engineer for housing. Due to these developments, the remainder of the farming land and much of the secondary growth rainforest on the escarpment has disappeared. Substantial rainforest remnants remain, especially in the protected area known as the Foote Sanctuary which provides well-maintained public walking paths and BBQ facilities. There is also access to the Buderim Falls. The area is home to an abundance of native wildlife, notably king parrots and lorikeets. Brush turkeys are also a common sight, as are families of kangaroos and wallabies.

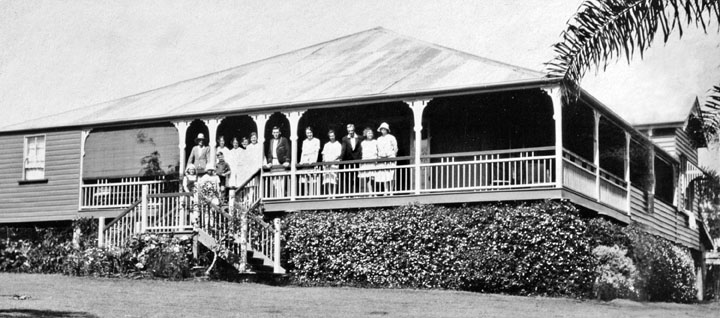
Boarding house built in the Queenslander style, Buderim Mountain, December 1930

Nowadays, the Mountain is notable for the variety of its architectural styles, which range from the classic 'Queenslander' to ultra-modern one-off designs. Some homes, especially those 'on top' with ocean views, sell for seven-figure sums. One celebrated 'mansion', straddling four blocks, has recently been on the market for 'offers close to $20 million'.

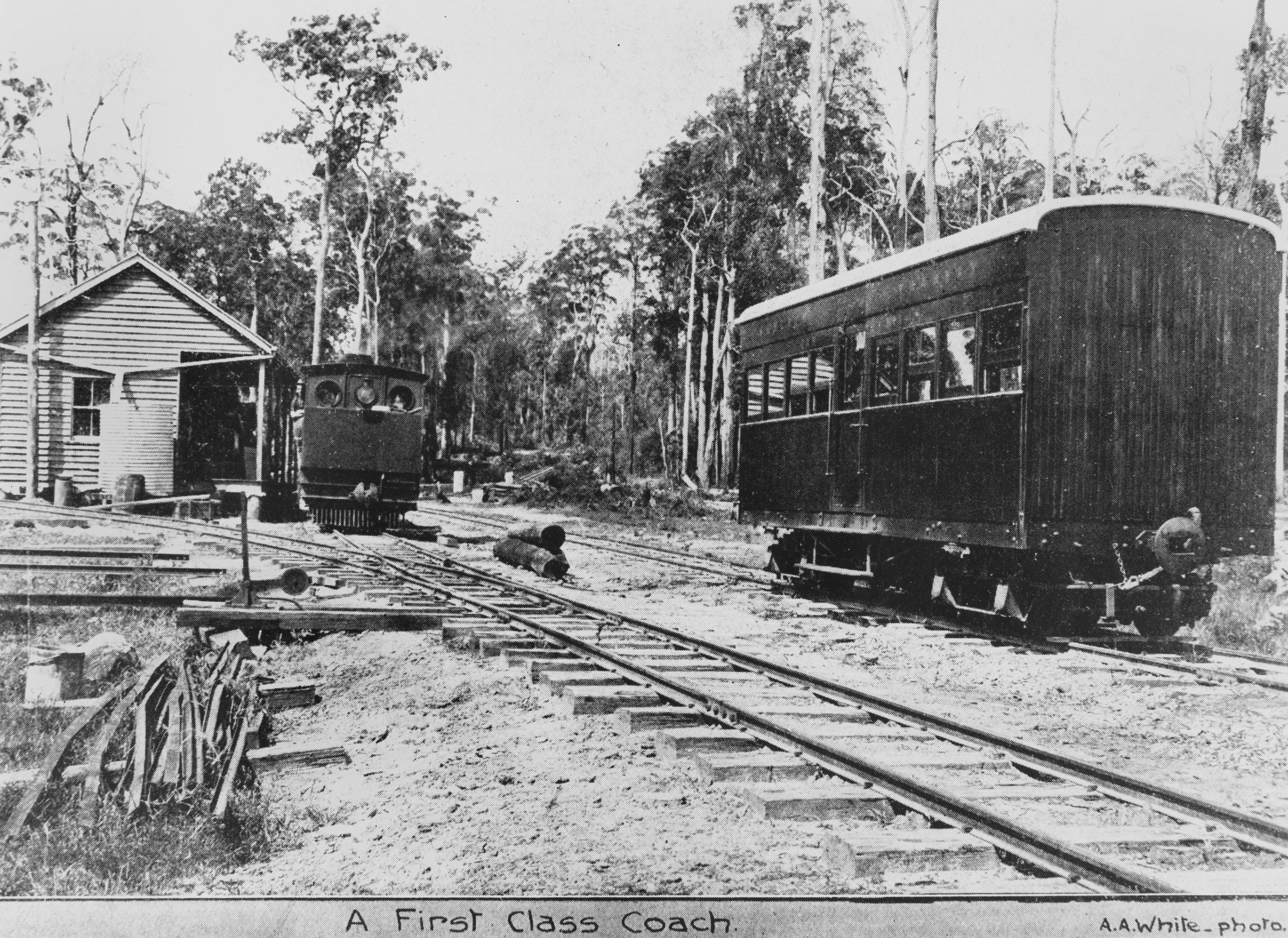
First Class Coach on the new Buderim tramway, ca. 1915

Buderim contains a significant heritage relic of the early days in the form of Pioneer Cottage, restored and cared for by the Buderim Historical Society.

Along with a number of other regional Australian newspapers owned by NewsCorp, the Buderim Chronicle newspaper ceased publication in June 2020.

== Heritage listings ==
Buderim has a number of heritage-listed sites, including:

- Pioneer Cottage, 5 Ballinger Crescent
- Canambie Homestead, 12 Dixon Road
- Buderim Mountain State School, 8–42 Main Street (26.6845°S 153.0523°E)
- Buderim House, 10 Orme Road
- Palmwoods-Buderim Tramway, Telco Road

== Transport ==
Buderim's suburbs are served by Kinetic Sunshine Coast, who operate a transfer station at Buderim Market Place, and a bus station at University of the Sunshine Coast. Various bus routes connect Buderim to Maroochydore, Caloundra, Nambour and other centres.

== Demographics ==
Census populations for the Buderim urban centre have been recorded since 1933. Due to a substantial redefinition of Buderim before the 2001 census, the first column records the UC/L population to 1996 and its component parts thereafter; the second records the SLA based on time series data.

Year	Population (UC/L)	Population (SLA)
1933	639	
1947	787	
1954	955	
1961	978	
1966	1,068	
1971	1,763	
1976	2,863	
1981	4,016	
1986	5,390	
1991	7,499	14,113
1996	12,458	24,043
2001	20,480	31,467
2006	27,354	39,881
2016	29,355	54,483
2021		58,956

In the 2016 census, the town of Buderim had a population of 29,355.

== Education ==
The University of the Sunshine Coast is located near Buderim at Sippy Downs.

The area is exceptionally well-served for both state and private schools, including:

- Buderim Mountain State School caters for Prep to Year 6. The school opened on 5 July 1875.
- Chancellor State College (secondary 2004; primary 1997)
- Mountain Creek State School (1994)
- Mountain Creek State High School (1995)
- Immanuel Lutheran College (1982)
- Matthew Flinders Anglican College (1989)
- Montessori International College (1982)
- Siena Catholic Primary School (2001)
- Siena Catholic College (1997)
- Sunshine Coast Grammar School (1997)
- Chevallum State School (1921)

A primary school operated in nearby Mons from 7 February 1916 to 31 December 1974.

== Amenities ==
Buderim Library is at 3 Main Street (26.6845°S 153.0547°E). It is operated by volunteers and is funded by memberships and other fund railsing.

The Sunshine Coast Council operates a mobile library service which visits Lindsay Road opposite the Post Office and North Buderim Boulevard.

The Buderim branch of the Queensland Country Women's Association meets at the QCWA Rooms at 3 Main Street.

St Mark's Anglican Church is at 7 Main Street (26.6849°S 153.0541°E). Services and other events are held Sunday to Thursday. It has a liberal outlook and supports the LGBT community.

Buderim Uniting Church is at 2–10 Gloucester Road (26.6838°S 153.0557°E).

== Attractions ==
The Buderim Heritage Walk introduces visitors to the history of Buderim through a walk through the historic places in the town.

== Notable people ==
- Andrew Dalton, countertenor; grew up in Buderim
- Bindi Irwin, actress, television presenter and conservationist, was born in Buderim
- Robert Irwin, television presenter and conservationist, was born in Buderim
- Harri Jones, racing driver, was born in Buderim
- Peggy Kelman, OBE Australian pioneer aviator, died in Buderim
- Mitch Larkin, Australian Swimmer, born in Buderim
- Tahlia Randall, Australian rules footballer, was born in Buderim
- Russell Skerman, Supreme Court Judge, retired to Buderim
- Edna Walling, landscape designer, retired to Buderim
- Jessica Watson, OAM, Australian sailor, resident of Buderim

== See also ==
- List of tramways in Queensland
