= Pioneer Cottage, Buderim =

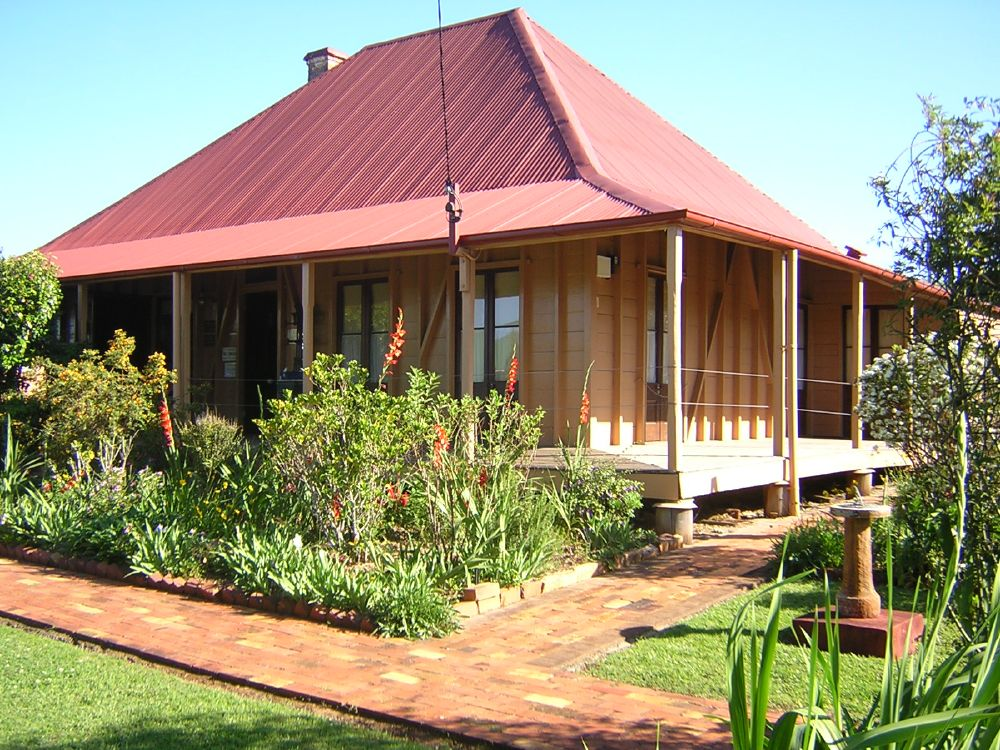
- Pioneer Cottage, 2006

- Location within Queensland Location within Australia
- 26.6869°S 153.0511°E
- Location: 5 Pioneer Crescent, Buderim, Sunshine Coast Region, Queensland, Australia

History
- Design period: 1870s–1890s (late 19th century)
- Built: c. 1882

Queensland Heritage Register
- Official name: Pioneer Cottage Buderim, JK Burnett (and family) residence
- Type: state heritage (built)
- Designated: 21 October 1992
- Reference no.: 600688
- Significant period: 1882 (fabric); 1882–c. 1953, 1967 (historical)
- Significant components: trees/plantings, farmhouse, hut/shack

Pioneer Cottage is a heritage-listed homestead at 5 Pioneer Crescent, Buderim, Sunshine Coast Region, Queensland, Australia. It was built c. 1882. It is also known as JK Burnett (and family) residence. It was added to the Queensland Heritage Register on 21 October 1992.

== History ==
The residence now known as Pioneer Cottage was erected probably in the early 1880s for Buderim Mountain settlers John Kerle Burnett, his wife Ann North and family. It remains one of the oldest surviving sawn-timber houses on the plateau, and currently functions as a house museum and headquarters of the Buderim Historical Society.

JK Burnett was the eldest son of schoolteacher John Burnett and his wife Jane Kerle, who with their 9 children emigrated to Queensland from Somerset, England, in 1866. They were accompanied on the voyage by Ann North, whom JK Burnett married in 1867. The Burnett family took up land at Burpengary. Several of the sons gained experience in the sugar mills around Caboolture and in the Tingalpa-Ormiston district, and became closely connected with the development of both the sugar and timber industries after the Separation of Queensland – on the north coast at Buderim Mountain, and at Wellington Point southeast of Brisbane.

From the early 1860s, Buderim Mountain had been extensively logged, principally for the fine stands of red cedar and white beech, which was shipped to Brisbane via William Pettigrew's wharf on the Mooloolah River. In 1870 the plateau was opened for selection. Many of the first selections were taken up purely for their timber resources (e.g. William Pettigrew's and Grigor's selections), and early agriculturalists made an income from timber while clearing the land. By the mid-1870s, sugar cane was grown extensively in the area, with planters utilising South Sea Islander labour. Buderim Mountain sugar planters John Fielding and his son-in-law Joseph Chapman Dixon, established the mountain's first sugar mill in October 1876. At that time John Kerle Burnett and his brother Harry moved from Burpengary to Buderim to take up work at Fielding and Dixon's mill. JK Burnett's wife and young family arrived a few weeks later. Initially they resided in Thomas Ridley's house – most likely the small slab house which Ridley had erected on his selection (portion 45, parish of Mooloolah) by July 1874.

In November 1878, John Kerle Burnett purchased portion 49, parish of Mooloolah, for £15, obtaining the deed of grant in March 1879. The block was part of an earlier forfeited 40 acres (16 ha) selection, half of which (20 acres (8.1 ha)) had been reserved for school purposes in 1877, and the remaining 20 acres (8.1 ha) sold to Burnett. It was centrally located, adjacent to the school reserve, and at the intersection of two principal roads (now Main Street and Ballinger Road). On part of this land Burnett built his family home (the present Pioneer Cottage), probably c. 1882/83. In the Caboolture Divisional Board Valuation Registers of 1881 and 1882, portion 49 is recorded as unimproved. There does not appear to be a record for 1883, but by 1884 the property was improved with a sawn house and stables - likely to refer to Pioneer Cottage. Early in 1882 JK Burnett raised a mortgage of £100 on the property, which may have been associated with the construction of the house.

The house was built of local timbers - tallow wood (Eucalyptus microcorys) for floor bearers, white beech (Gmelina leichhardtii) for floors, walls, and ceilings and red cedar (Toona australis) for joinery - thought to have been felled on the property or acquired from nearby, and pit-sawn and handcrafted to make boards. Bricks for steps and a fireplace were hand-made, probably from local clay. The core initially comprised a central hallway and 4 rooms - front parlour, front bedroom, rear dining room and rear bedroom. The latter was partitioned into two bedrooms at some stage - some Burnett descendants believe it was always partitioned. A short time later two attic bedrooms were added. Early photographs of the house show external walls of deep boards and exposed timber stud framing, encircled by verandahs and resting on low stumps. The high-pitched shingled roof had a short ridge, and the verandah roofs, also shingled, were supported on plain chamfered timber posts. Glass and timber-panelled French doors opened onto the verandahs from all rooms. The first front steps were of timber, but had been replaced by 1907 with masonry steps. Between early 1907 and mid-1909, the verandah roofs were replaced with corrugated galvanised iron; later the whole roof was clad with iron. An external oven and chimney is shown in the earliest photograph, dated c. 1880, but later a detached kitchen wing was built.

In 1880 a second sugar mill - The Buderim Mountain Sugar Company Mill - was established by local growers, with financial backing from James Campbell and Sons. By 1884, JK Burnett had left his employment with Dixon and Fielding to take up the management of the Company mill, with his brother Ernest employed as sugar boiler. The mill was located below the present post office, a short distance from JK Burnett's home. At this period there were still only 7 farming families on Buderim Mountain: Fielding, Dixon, Guy, Caton, Lindsay, Coghill and Ballinger, but they were able to support two sugar mills. Buderim farmers appear initially to have made a good return from the Company mill. Between 1881 and 1884, many of the early slab homes were replaced with sawn-timber houses, and by the late 1880s a small village had developed around the intersection of the two principal roads on the mountain, with a state school, School of Arts, general store, blacksmith's shop, 3 or 4 residences, and the Buderim Mountain Sugar Company Mill. However, from 1885, legislation designed to curtail the employment of South Sea Islanders on sugar plantations forced most Buderim Mountain sugar planters to turn to alternative crops - principally bananas, oranges and other fruits. By August 1889 the Buderim Mountain Sugar Company Mill had closed, and Joseph Charles Dixon was the only Buderim Mountain farmer still growing sugar cane on a commercial scale, sustaining his mill until 1896.

JK Burnett left the Company mill in the second half of the 1880s, possibly by 1887, and established the mountain's first general store, at the corner of Ballinger Road and Main Street. From 1 March 1892, operation of the Buderim Mountain Post Office passed from mill owner Joseph Dixon to storekeeper JK Burnett. Burnett also farmed nearby land.

The JK Burnetts were well known in the district and played an active role in their community. Ann Burnett was widely respected for her skills as a nurse and midwife, and as one of the principal influences behind the establishment of the Methodist Church on Buderim Mountain. JK Burnett was a member of the local School of Arts committee. Ann died in 1905, and her husband remained in the family home until his death in 1921. In his later years he was cared for by his son Edward Lionel Burnett, a saddler by trade. After his marriage in 1912, Lionel, with his wife Etta Low and family, continued to live in the Burnett home. Lionel Burnett was also well known in the district, for many years delivering milk and vegetables daily to the local community.

Title to subdivision 2 of portion 49, parish of Mooloolah, County of Canning (19 acres (7.7 ha) 2 roods (22,000 sq ft; 2,000 m^{2}) containing the house site) was transferred from John Kerle Burnett to Edward Lionel Burnett in mid-1921, just prior to JK Burnett's death. The Lionel Burnetts made some alterations to the property: in the early 1920s the two small bedrooms at the back were converted into one larger bedroom; in the 1930s the detached kitchen was demolished, the two corners of the back verandah were enclosed, and one of these was furnished as the new kitchen. Etta Burnett died in 1944, and her husband is understood to have left the place in 1946, renting it to the local postman. Following Lionel's death in 1950, his former home passed to his daughter Dorothea, who subdivided the property (Ballinger Crescent was created at this time) and offered it for auction in January 1953. The house was purchased by Miss Sybil Addison Vise, whose family had lived on Buderim Mountain since the early 1900s, and who kept the place as a rental property. In 1965 Miss Vise subdivided the house block yet again, and offered the former Burnett residence, on 22.2 perches (560 m^{2}), to the local community. The offer was readily accepted. Title was registered with the trustees of the Buderim War Memorial Centre [formerly the Buderim School of Arts], and in 1966 the Buderim Historical Society was formed to care for the place. Local service clubs such as Apex and Rotary assisted in the community restoration of the old Burnett home, which was opened as an historical museum by Queensland Premier Frank Nicklin on 23 September 1967. The stumps, verandah posts and verandah flooring were replaced in the 1960s with similar materials; the earlier corrugated iron also has been replaced.

== Description ==
Pioneer Cottage is located on a small parcel of land in a suburban street in central Buderim, on the high ridge which forms the spine of the plateau, facing northeast.

It is a modest, single-storeyed, exposed-frame timber building, constructed of pit-sawn and hand-dressed local beech [floors and wall and ceiling linings], red cedar [joinery], tallowwood [bearers and wall plates] and hardwoods (wall framing and roof structure), and set on low timber stumps. It has a steeply pitched roof, with corrugated iron covering the original shingle battens, and two dormer windows on the southwest side, opening from an attic space. The four-roomed core is surrounded by verandahs with simple chamfered posts supporting the verandah roofs, which extend from the main roof at a different pitch. These are unlined, and the early shingle battens are visible. French doors open from each room onto the verandahs.

The core has a modestly-sized central hallway, from which doors open off to the front parlour on the right, and the front bedroom and rear dining room on the left. The dining room has a fireplace, the brick chimney of which, formerly rendered, is now exposed. A narrow staircase leads from the hallway to two attic bedrooms, preventing any access from the hallway to the rear bedroom on the right - this is accessed from the rear and north side verandahs. Evidence in the fabric indicates that this rear bedroom was at some period divided into two rooms, both accessed from the verandahs. The rear (south-west) verandah has been enclosed with c. 1920s/30s weatherboards and timber casement windows, possibly in more than one stage. In the process, a small room has been created at each end of this verandah.

The internal walls are all lined, mostly with wide tongue and groove beech boards with a single bead. The hallway ceiling is of wide beech boards, but the remaining ceilings are of later, narrow tongue and groove boards, possibly indicating that the original ceilings were of calico. The attic rooms are lined throughout with narrow tongue and groove boards. The interior has a number of finishes: the walls of the main rooms and hallway painted or wall-papered (this appears to be quite recent); the attic rooms unpainted; the joinery varnished; and the floors bare.

The house is surrounded by a small garden, most of which is recent planting. The palm stands at the front entrance may be associated with early planting evident in late 19th/early 20th century photographs. The original service wing has been demolished. There is a slab hut at the rear of the house, moved to this site after 1965. The street frontage to Ballinger Crescent has a late 20th century post and rail fence, associated with the renovation of the place as a house museum. In the north garden is a large iron pan associated with the Fielding-Dixon Sugar Mill.

== Heritage listing ==
Pioneer Cottage was listed on the Queensland Heritage Register on 21 October 1992 having satisfied the following criteria.

The place is important in demonstrating the evolution or pattern of Queensland's history.

Pioneer Cottage, the former JK Burnett home erected c. 1882-83, is important in demonstrating the early development of Buderim Mountain as an agricultural settlement, in particular the early success of sugar growing and sugar milling in the district.

The place demonstrates rare, uncommon or endangered aspects of Queensland's cultural heritage.

It is one of the oldest surviving residences on the plateau, remains substantially intact, and demonstrates the principal characteristics of an early 1880s farmhouse built of local timbers no longer generally available.

The place is important in demonstrating the principal characteristics of a particular class of cultural places.

It is one of the oldest surviving residences on the plateau, remains substantially intact, and demonstrates the principal characteristics of an early 1880s farmhouse built of local timbers no longer generally available.

The place is important because of its aesthetic significance.

The rustic materials and simple form and plan have an aesthetic quality valued by the community.

The place has a strong or special association with a particular community or cultural group for social, cultural or spiritual reasons.

The place has a special association for the Buderim community, as evidenced by their acquisition of the property for museum purposes in the mid-1960s.

The place has a special association with the life or work of a particular person, group or organisation of importance in Queensland's history.

Pioneer Cottage is significant for its close association with one of the early families of Buderim Mountain, the JK Burnetts, and for its close association with the work of the Buderim Historical Society.
