= Ballymore Cup =

The Ballymore Cup is an under 17 schoolboys rugby union competition run by the Queensland Rugby Union.

== History ==
=== Origin ===
The competition grew out of the Metropolitan Cup which was established in 1999 as a knockout competition in Brisbane for secondary schools outside the traditional rugby schools.

=== 2003 ===
2003 saw the Ballymore Cup include schools from the Gold Coast, Darling Downs and Sunshine Coast regions. According to the Queensland Rugby Union, this led to increased interest in the competition and an improved standard.

=== 2004 ===
2004 was a ground breaking year with 91 schools from North Queensland, South Queensland and Metropolitan schools all vying for a Super 8 place at Ballymore.

The 2004 Ballymore Cup achieved the QRU's goal of providing a state-wide competition with participating schools experiencing integration between the traditional rugby union sporting districts.

Schools were divided into two divisions, depending on their playing strength, with only the top division having a third/fourth playoff.

=== 2005 ===
The Division 1 winner in 2005 Winner was All Saints Anglican School

=== 2006 ===
Division 1 winner in 2006 was Trinity Lutheran College, from the Gold Coast, who defeated Matthew Flinders from the Sunshine Coast in the final 19–0.

=== 2007 ===
Division 1 Final: Sunshine Coast Grammar School defeated Marsden State High School
Division 1 "Spirit of Rugby": Rockhampton Grammar School defeated Forest Lake State High School
Division 2 Final: Xavier College defeated Clontarf State High School

==== Division 1 Bracket ====
Semi-finals
Brisbane {Ballymore Stadium}
Sunshine Coast Grammar School	20
Rockhampton Grammar School	10
Brisbane {Ballymore Stadium}
Marsden State High School	?
Forest Lake State High School	?

Final
Brisbane {Ballymore Stadium}
Sunshine Coast Grammar School	20
Marsden State High School	10
Third place
Brisbane {Ballymore Stadium}
Rockhampton Grammar School	?
Forest Lake State High School	?
