= Russell Skerman =

Former Justice of the Supreme Court of Queensland

The Honourable Russell Skerman
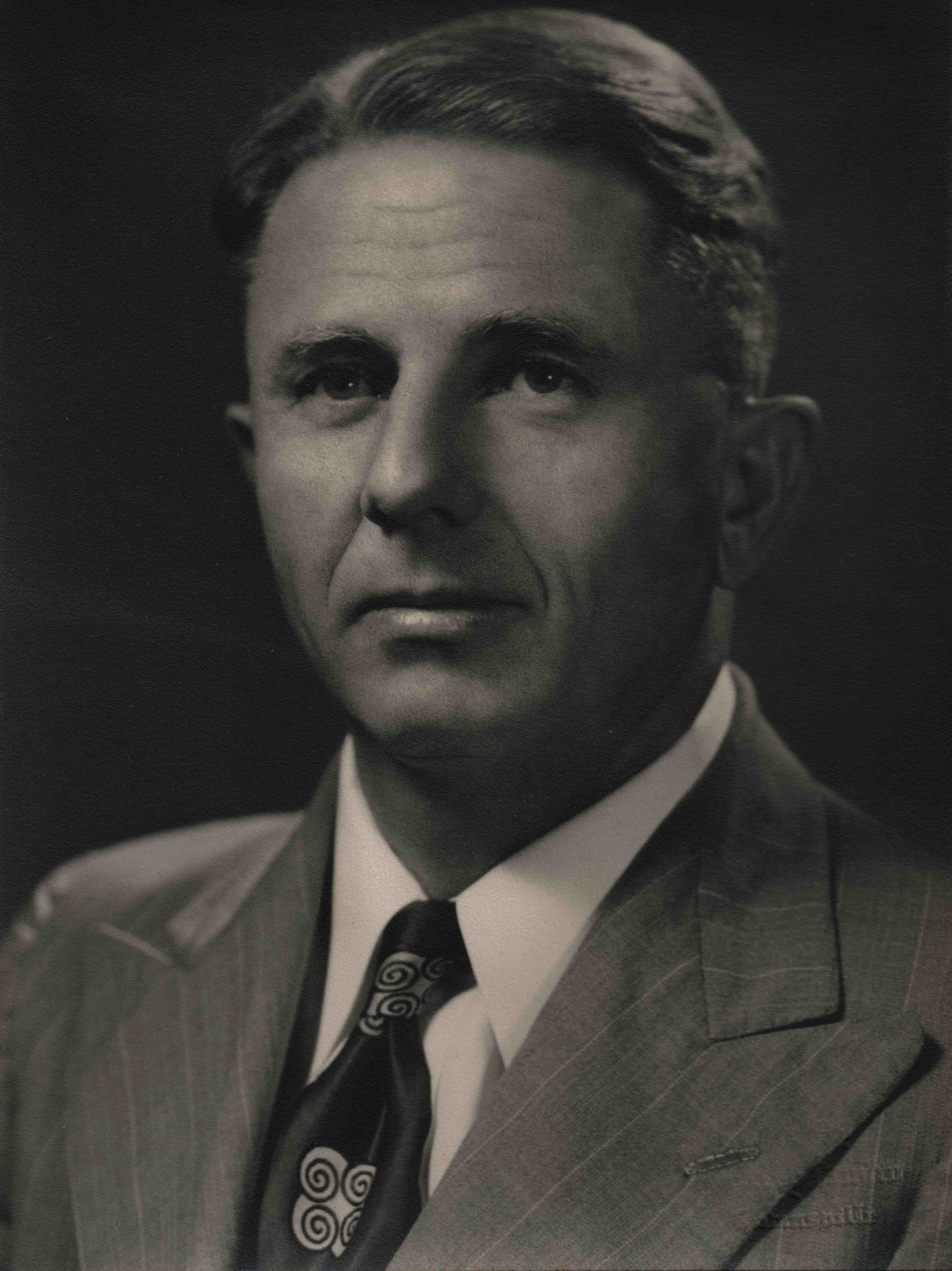
- Russell Skerman, Judge of the Supreme Court of Queensland

Justice of Supreme Court of Queensland
- In office 1962–1973

Personal details
- Born: 24 September 1903 Kobble Creek, Queensland, Australia
- Died: 24 February 1983 (aged 79) Buderim, Queensland, Australia
- Spouse: Leila Beaujolais Imrie Harris
- Occupation: Barrister, Judge

Russell Wigton Skerman (24 September 1903 – 24 February 1983) was a judge of the Supreme Court of Queensland from 1962 to 1973. Skerman was the Northern Judge based in Townsville, Northern Queensland from 1962 to 1970. In 1970, he transferred to the Supreme Court in Brisbane until his retirement in 1973. He was also an acting judge of the Supreme Court in Townsville for two months in May and June 1953.

== Early life ==
Skerman was born on 24 September 1903 in Kobble Creek, near Brisbane, Queensland. He attended Warwick High School and the University of Queensland and graduated with a Bachelor of Arts. He played hockey at university and was a member of the 1925 Inter-Varsity hockey team. Queensland University has published on its website a picture of Skerman as part of the 1922 undergraduate class.

After graduation he initially became a schoolteacher. In 1929 he resigned as a teacher to qualify as a barrister. In 1930 he was appointed as an associate to Justice Robert Douglas in Townsville. He was admitted as a barrister in 1932 and then practiced as a barrister in Townsville until his appointment as a judge.

In 1939, he unsuccessfully ran for State Parliament as a UAP-Country Party candidate in a by-election called after the death of the ALP incumbent for Townsville, Maurice "Mossy" Hynes.

He married Leila Beaujolais Imrie Harris and they had two daughters, Claire and Rosemary.

== Wartime service ==
During World War II he enlisted in the Australian Army in August 1941 and was initially appointed as a lieutenant before being promoted to captain in December 1941. In December 1943 he was promoted to the rank of major. He served most of his time in the army as a legal officer in Papua New Guinea, but towards the end for the war was assigned to "Special Duties" in Hollandia (now Jayapura) for eight months. He was demobilised in January 1946.

== Judicial appointments ==
In May 1953, Skerman, who was at the time the senior barrister in North Queensland, was appointed an acting judge of the Supreme Court of Queensland, while the new Northern Judge, Justice Thomas O'Hagan who had been appointed to replace Robert Douglas was indisposed due to ill-health. He served as acting judge for 2 months.

Skerman was appointed a full-time judge in 1962, succeeding Justice Kenneth Townley. As the only judge in North Queensland, Skerman handled both civil and criminal matters. He would also be required to go on circuit to the major towns of North Queensland, including Mt Isa, Cairns and Cloncurry. Sittings on circuit could often go late into the night. Skerman recalled in his retirement speech a murder trial in Cloncurry going until 3 am so that he could attend morning sessions that had been scheduled in Cairns.

As a judge, Skerman was described as "painstakingly careful". In a speech on his retirement, Sir Mostyn Hanger, the Chief Justice said: "For him to reach the right conclusion was an end for which no pains should be spared, and much midnight oil was burned", adding that his judgments were "careful" and "lucid".

He was the trial judge (without a jury) in the case of Pusey v Mount Isa Mines where the High Court of Australia ultimately upheld his decision relating to proximity and nervous shock.

== Retirement ==
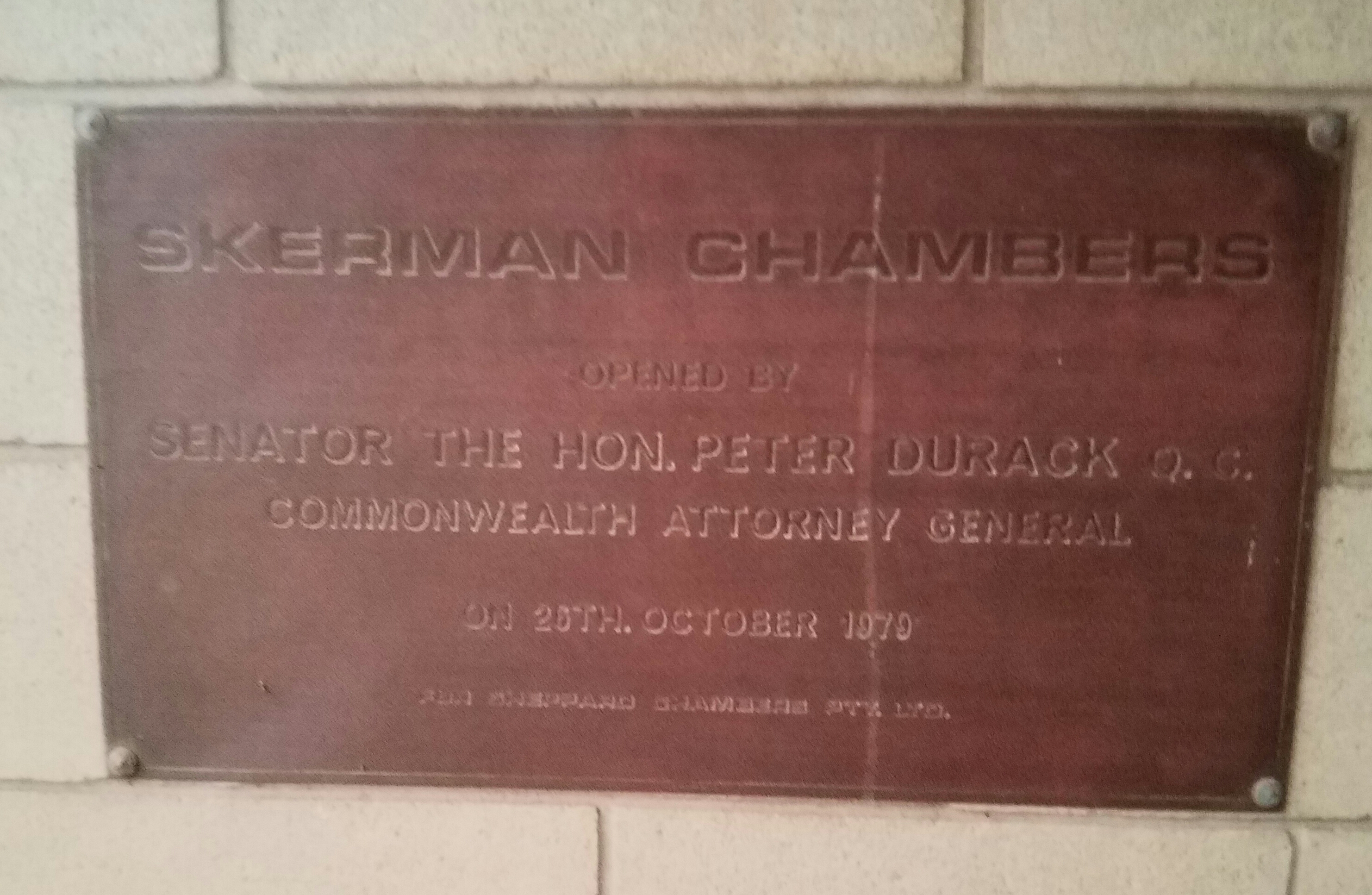
Plaque on Skerman Chambers, Townsville Queensland

Skerman retired in 1973 and moved to Buderim, on the Sunshine Coast, about 100 kilometres (60 mi) north of Brisbane. A ceremony was held for him on retirement attended by many judges, barristers and his family. After retirement in 1974, Queen Elizabeth II approved the retention of the title "Honourable" by Skerman.

Skerman died on 24 February 1983 at the age of 79 and was buried in the Buderim Cemetery.

Skerman Chambers in Townsville, built next to the Townsville Supreme Court Building were named after him. The Queensland Legal Aid Department and other lawyers have offices in the building.

== Other contributions ==
Skerman played in important part in the establishment of James Cook University in Townsville. He was one of the original members of the Advisory Council to form the university.

== Resources ==
- Commission appointing Skerman as an acting judge in 1953
- Commission appointing Skerman as a judge in 1962
- Commission transferring Skerman to Brisbane in 1970
- Supreme Court of Queensland Library biography of Skerman (including a picture of him in judicial robes)
