= Canambie Homestead =

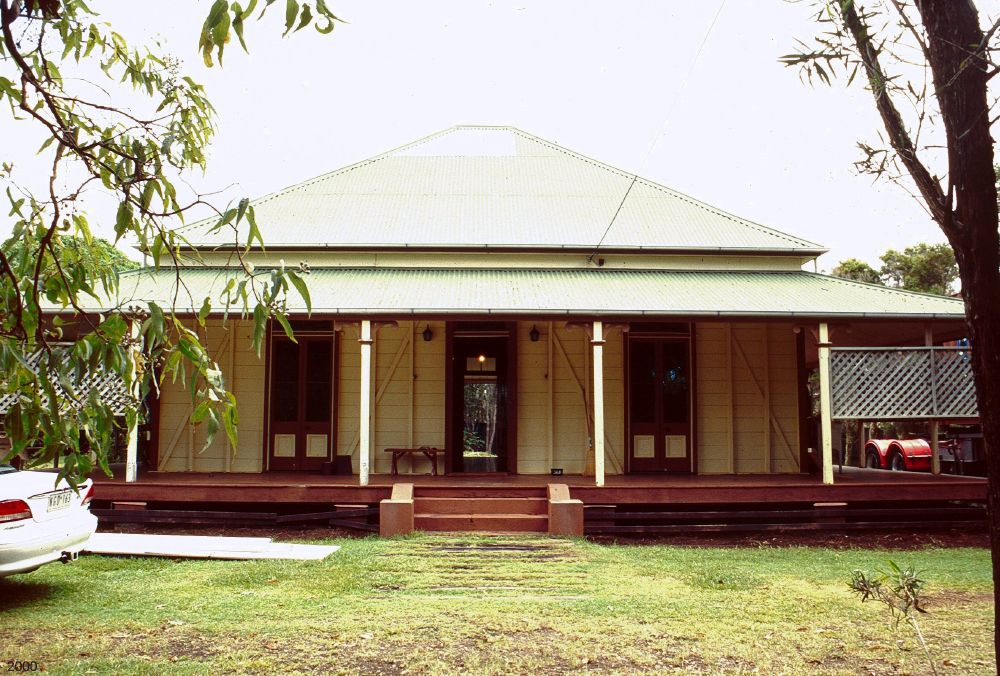
- Canambie Homestead, 2000

- Location within Queensland Location within Australia
- 26.6856°S 153.0708°E
- Location: 12 Dixon Road, Buderim, Sunshine Coast Region, Queensland, Australia

History
- Design period: 1870s–1890s (late 19th century)
- Built: c. 1883

Queensland Heritage Register
- Official name: Canambie Homestead, Joseph Dixon's House
- Type: state heritage (built)
- Designated: 22 October 2000
- Reference no.: 602166
- Significant period: 1880s (fabric); 1880s–1970s (historical)
- Significant components: farmhouse, plantings – exotic

Canambie Homestead is a heritage-listed plantation at 12 Dixon Road, Buderim, Sunshine Coast Region, Queensland, Australia. It was built c. 1883. It is also known as Joseph Dixon's House. It was added to the Queensland Heritage Register on 22 October 2000.

== History ==
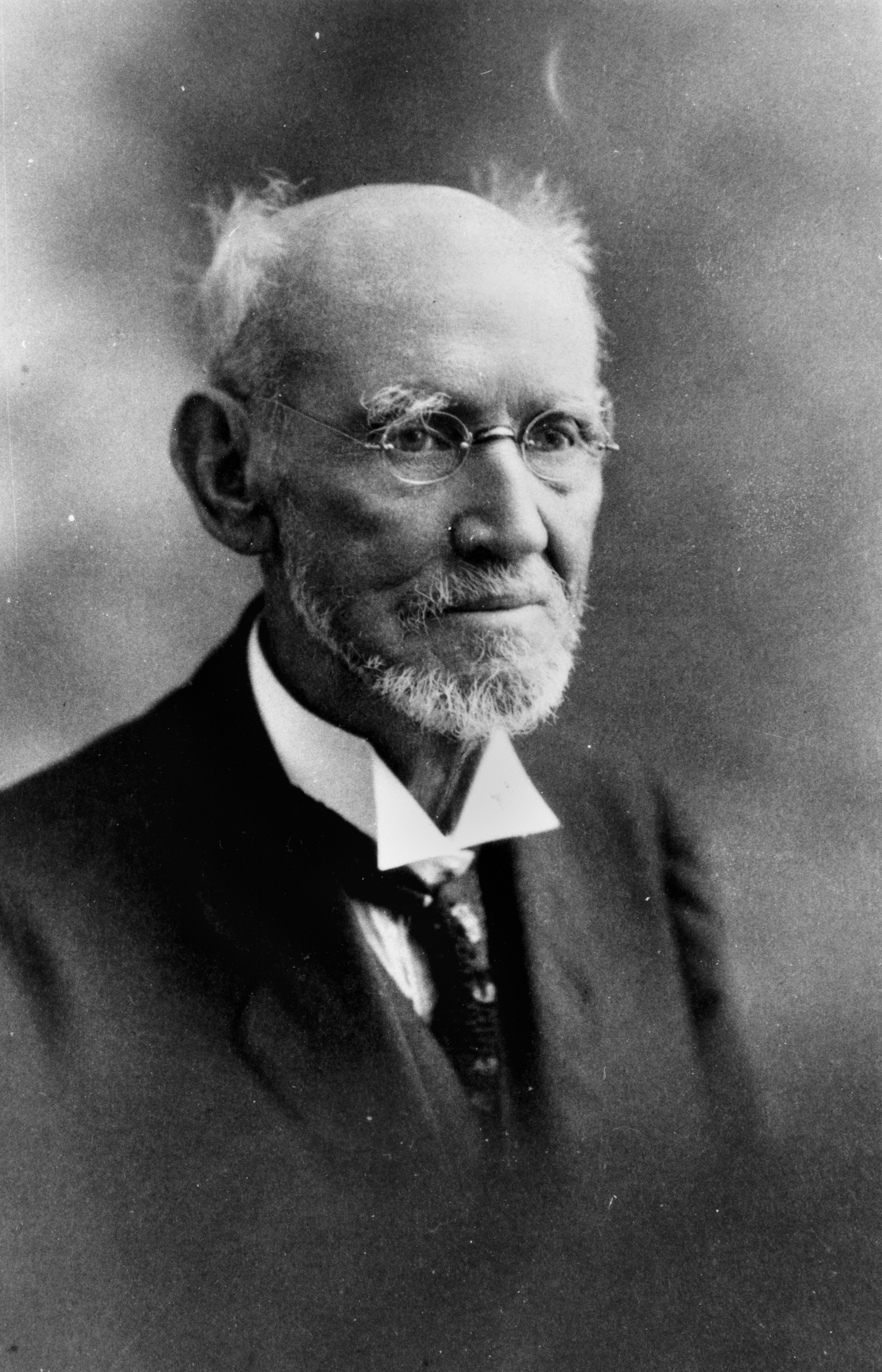
Joseph Chapman Dixon

Canambie Homestead was erected probably in the early 1880s for Buderim Mountain sugar planter and sugar mill owner Joseph Chapman Dixon, his wife Elizabeth Alice Fielding, and family. The name "canambie" reputedly is an indigenous word meaning "black plum". The place is still utilised as a residence, and remains one of the earliest surviving sawn-timber houses on the plateau.

JC Dixon emigrated from Liverpool to Melbourne in mid-1864, when in his early twenties. He moved almost immediately to Sydney, where he worked in a variety of occupations for several years. In 1868, lured by reports of the success of the sugar industry in Queensland, Dixon and two fellow members of the Society of Friends visited the Moreton Bay district. The party was guided by timbergetter William Grigor to the Mooloolah Plains, as yet unselected, then returned to Sydney. In 1869 JC Dixon returned to Queensland with four other Friends, all of whom selected land on the Mooloolah River, and commenced sugar cane cultivation. Dixon in partnership with Herbert Everett selected land downstream, which proved a poor choice - their sugar crop was badly damaged by floods. They abandoned the selection and moved to a sugar plantation on Doughboy Creek, near Brisbane. When at Mooloolah, Dixon had heard from a timbergetter about Buderim Mountain. Selling his interest in the Doughboy Creek property to Everett, Dixon made the first application to select land on Buderim Mountain, in June 1870.

From the early 1860s, Buderim Mountain had been extensively logged, principally for the fine stands of red cedar and white beech, which was shipped to Brisbane via William Pettigrew's wharf on the Mooloolah River. In mid-1870 the plateau was opened for selection. Dixon took up adjoining portions 44 (80 acres (32 ha)) and 53 (30 acres (12 ha)), parish of Mooloolah, in June and August 1870 respectively, erecting as his first residence a slab hut on portion 44. Many of the first selections were taken up for their timber resources (e.g. Pettigrew's and Grigor's selections), and early agriculturalists made an income from timber while clearing the land. Dixon also ran cattle on the plateau, which he slaughtered and sold to his neighbours in return for their labour, and hired a teamster to drive a bullock team hauling timber to the coast. At the Queensland census of 1 September 1871, the farming district of Mount Buderan contained only 3 inhabited houses. Within a few years more land had been selected, and from 1 April 1874 Thomas Ridley, who had selected portion 45 within a day of Dixon's first selection in June 1870, operated the Buderim Mountain postal receiving office.

In 1873, Joseph Chapman Dixon married Elizabeth Alice Fielding of Eagle Farm, near Brisbane, returning with his bride to the slab hut on Buderim Mountain. By August 1874, Dixon was cultivating principally maize and sugar cane, with some coffee. By the mid-1870s, sugar cane was grown extensively on Buderim Mountain, with planters utilising South Sea Islander labour. In 1875, JC Dixon and his father-in-law John Fielding went into partnership to established the mountain's first sugar mill, which was erected on part of portion 47 (Mill Road is indicative of the site). Fielding and Dixon purchased an evaporating-pan sugar plant from Fountains of Burpengary, who had imported it from Scotland. The site was surveyed and burnt off in late 1875, the sheds and chimney were erected through early and mid-1876, Fountains dismantled the plant and sent it by steamboat to the Maroochy River in July, in August the plant was brought by bullock wagon up the mountain, and the first cane was crushed in October 1876. In the early 1880s, Dixon and Fielding converted to the vacuum pan system of sugar production, to increase efficiency.

By 1881, JC Dixon was one of the largest landholders on Buderim Mountain, having acquired the freehold of nearly 480 acres (190 ha) and the leasehold of another 80 acres (32 ha), and was in partnership with John Fielding in the freehold of another 200 acres (81 ha) and the 3 acres (1.2 ha) mill site. By the mid-1880s he had acquired another 1,000 acres (400 ha) of scrub land running down the southeast side of the mountain to Mountain Creek.

It is not clear when Dixon erected Canambie Homestead, which sits on part of what was formerly portion 53. Information recorded in the Caboolture Divisional Board Valuation Register of 1881 suggests that Dixon worked contiguous portions 24, 44 and 53 (a total of 130 acres (53 ha)) as one farm, and that in 1881 improvements comprised 4 slab houses, 40 acres (16 ha) under cultivation, and some fencing. With all the land that Dixon and Fielding held on Buderim in 1881, between them they owned only 1 sawn-timber house, and that was located on portion 45, formerly owned by Thomas Ridley and by then jointly owned by Dixon and Fielding. It may be that the Dixon-Fielding families were sharing a house at that period. A similar pattern was recorded in 1882. There does not appear to be a record for 1883, but by 1884, Dixon's combined portions 44 and 53 (110 acres (45 ha)) were improved with a sawn house and stables and a slab house with outbuildings. The data does not make it clear on which block the sawn-timber house was located, but it likely refers to Canambie Homestead.

Besides being one of the principal employers and largest landowners on Buderim Mountain, JC Dixon was an active member of the local community. He was instrumental in the establishment of a provisional school at Buderim Mountain in 1875–76, and served as secretary of the School Committee from 1876 until at least 1888. By July 1876 he had been appointed a Justice of the Peace, and in the same year took over the operation of the Buderim Mountain postal receiving office from Thomas Ridley. When the receiving office was elevated to a post office in June 1884, JC Dixon was appointed the first postmaster, a position he held until March 1892, when the job passed to Buderim storekeeper John Kerle Burnett. In August 1888, he was appointed a trustee of the new Buderim School of Arts. In mid-1895 he opened a school for his South Sea Islander employees.

In 1880 a second sugar mill on the mountain - The Buderim Mountain Sugar Company Mill - was established by local growers, with financial backing from James Campbell and Sons. At this period there were still only 7 main farming families on Buderim Mountain, but they were able to support two sugar mills. Buderim farmers initially made a good return from sugar. Between 1881 and 1884, many of the early slab homes were replaced with sawn-timber houses, and by the late 1880s a small village had developed around the intersection of the two principal roads on the mountain (now Main and Ballinger). From 1885, however, legislation designed to curtail the employment of South Sea Islanders on sugar plantations forced most Buderim Mountain sugar planters to turn to alternative crops - principally bananas and oranges. By August 1889 the Buderim Mountain Sugar Company Mill had closed. JC Dixon was the only Buderim Mountain farmer still growing sugar cane on a commercial scale.

Dixon claimed in his reminiscences that by 1896 the returns from sugar no longer justified production costs, hence he closed the mill that had been operating for 20 years. He may also have been fearful of the competition likely to be generated by the new Moreton Guarantee Sugar Mill, erected at Nambour in 1896–97, which became the central mill for the Buderim-Maroochy-Mooloolah-Nambour district. In 1896 he sold the stock, stores, plant and some of the houses associated with his mill, but retained his Buderim land.

Although Dixon had taken up land at Flaxton on the Blackall Range by the early 1890s, and was developing it with coffee and orange trees from 1892, when he sold the Buderim mill he moved to Gympie, where he spent the next 11 years in the boot trade (backed by his brother Thomas Coar Dixon, boot manufacturer of Brisbane). Dixon then sold out and returned to Flaxton, where he established a successful dairy and worked his citrus orchard. It is understood that Joseph and Elizabeth Dixon remained at Flaxton until their deaths in the late 1920s. On Buderim Mountain, the family is commemorated in the naming of Dixon and Mill roads and Fielding Street.

John North Burnett, son of Buderim Mountain's first storekeeper, John Kerle Burnett, may have occupied Canambie after the Dixons moved to Gympie. Around 1900, John North Burnett was recorded as a fruit grower and boarding house keeper on Buderim Mountain - whether he had converted Canambie into a boarding house has not been verified - but by 1903 the family had moved to a farm at Brookfield, near Brisbane. In 1905, title to about 16.5 acres (6.7 ha) of portion 53, containing the Canambie Homestead site, was transferred from Dixon to John North Burnett, farmer, of Brookfield. In 1910, the title passed to his brother, Charles Arthur Burnett. Title changed hands several times in the 1930s, until acquired by the Hamilton family in 1938, who kept the property until the late 1960s or 1970s. It is understood that new owners in the 1970s undertook considerable restoration work on the house, which was by then on a considerably reduced block. A detached building was erected in the backyard c. 1970s, utilising similar materials and detailing to the homestead.

== Description ==
Canambie Homestead is located on a substantial suburban block in central Buderim, on the high ridge which forms the spine of the plateau, facing southeast.

It is a substantial, single-storeyed, exposed-frame timber building, constructed of local beech (floors, wall linings and ceilings), red cedar (joinery), and hardwoods (framing and roof structure), and set on low stumps, some of which have been replaced with concrete blocks. It has a short-ridged roof clad with corrugated iron, covering early shingle battens. The core of the house is surrounded by verandahs with simple chamfered posts with timber capitals and decorative timber brackets supporting the verandah roofs, which are separate from the main roof. These are lined with the same wide, single-bead boards used on the walls. French doors open from each room onto the verandahs. The rear verandah has been enclosed at the northern end with wide, chamfered slabs, and currently functions as the kitchen. The floors of this enclosed verandah are of the same wide beech boards as the interior floors; the remainder of the verandah flooring is of more recent narrow hardwood boards.

The core has a long, wide central hallway, from which doors open off to the front parlour and rear dining room to the left, and to three equal-sized bedrooms to the right. Above each of the internal doors is a decorative timber fretwork ventilation panel. Three folding cedar doors between the parlour and dining room, can be opened to create one large entertaining space. The dining room has a fireplace backing onto the hallway wall, with a fine cedar fireplace surround and the chimney clad with the same wide, tongue and groove, single- bead timber as lines the walls and ceilings throughout the core. Between the fireplace and the rear wall is a built-in dresser or sideboard.

Ceilings throughout have been painted white, but the walls are oiled, and have developed a rich patina. Joinery and doors throughout are of varnished red cedar, excluding the rear door at the end of the hallway, which of more recent vintage. The internal floors have been sanded and coated recently with a polyurethane finish.

A detached c. 1970s building is located in the backyard, adjacent to the main house. It is a timber structure resting on a cement slab, and mimics in detailing the earlier house, with verandahs on three sides, the same timber posts and brackets as the main house, an exposed timber frame lined with wide single-bead silky oak boards, and French doors opening onto the north verandah. The interior space is one large room.

The house is set well back from the street, behind a high, late 20th century timber fence. Trees in the front grounds appear to date from the same period, and there is little evidence of an earlier garden layout. On the southern side of the house, attached to the verandah, is a timber trellis supporting a very old grape vine, which is likely to be associated with much earlier times.

== Heritage listing ==
Canambie Homestead was listed on the Queensland Heritage Register on 22 October 2000 having satisfied the following criteria.

The place is important in demonstrating the evolution or pattern of Queensland's history.

Canambie Homestead, erected probably in the early 1880s, is important in demonstrating the early development of Buderim Mountain as an agricultural settlement, in particular the early success of sugar growing and sugar milling in the district.

The place demonstrates rare, uncommon or endangered aspects of Queensland's cultural heritage.

It is one of the oldest surviving residences on the plateau, remains substantially intact, and is important in demonstrating the principal characteristics of an early 1880s farmhouse of substantial proportions and fine detailing and workmanship, constructed of local timbers no longer generally available.

The place is important in demonstrating the principal characteristics of a particular class of cultural places.

It is one of the oldest surviving residences on the plateau, remains substantially intact, and is important in demonstrating the principal characteristics of an early 1880s farmhouse of substantial proportions and fine detailing and workmanship, constructed of local timbers no longer generally available.

The place is important because of its aesthetic significance.

The materials, timber detailing and workmanship, and simple plan and form, demonstrate a strong aesthetic quality.

The place has a strong or special association with a particular community or cultural group for social, cultural or spiritual reasons.

The place is one of the finest early residences on the mountain and has a special association for the Buderim community with its heritage.

The place has a special association with the life or work of a particular person, group or organisation of importance in Queensland's history.

Canambie Homestead is significant for its close association with one of the earliest settler families on Buderim Mountain, the JC Dixon, who in partnership with John Fielding, established the first sugar mill on Buderim Mountain, 1876–1896.
