= Matthew Flinders Anglican College =

Location
- Stringybark Road, Buderim, Queensland, Australia; 26°41′57″S 153°03′35″E

Information
- Type: Independent co-educational primary and secondary day school
- Motto: Faith, Skill, Endeavour
- Denomination: Anglican
- Established: 1990; 36 years ago
- Principal: Michelle Carroll (2024)
- Staff: 300+
- Years: Prep–12
- Enrolment: 1,300 (2019)
- Campus type: Suburban
- Colours: Navy blue, jade
- Song: "In Matthew Flinders' Name"
- Website: mfac.edu.au

Matthew Flinders Anglican College (MFAC) is an independent Anglican co-educational primary and secondary day school located in Buderim, approximately 90 kilometres (56 mi) north of Brisbane, on the Sunshine Coast of Queensland, Australia. Founded in 1990 and named in honour of Matthew Flinders, the college has grown from an enrolment of 160 students in its foundation year, to over 1,300 students in 2015.

== Overview ==
In 2011, the school's Overall Position and NAPLAN results put the school in the top 100 schools in Australia, top 10 schools in Queensland and highest-achieving school in the Sunshine Coast.

In 2012, the college completed its 600-seat performance centre.

== Houses ==
The students are divided into four (primary) and eight (secondary) houses, each named after a notable Australian person:

Primary
House	Namesake	Colour
Freeman	Cathy Freeman, Olympic sprinter	Silver
Milton	Michael Milton, Paralympic skier	White
Rafter	Pat Rafter, tennis player	Navy blue
Thomas	Petria Thomas, Olympic swimmer	Jade

Secondary
House	Namesake	Colour
Bradman	Sir Donald Bradman, cricketer	Navy blue
Chisholm	Caroline Chisholm, humanitarian	White
Helpmann	Sir Robert Helpmann, dancer	Yellow
Mawson	Douglas Mawson, explorer	Silver
McCubbin	Frederick McCubbin, artist	Maroon
Oliphant	Mark Oliphant, physicist	Red
Sutherland	Dame Joan Sutherland, opera singer	Sky blue
Thiele	Colin Thiele, author	Jade

== Dean Carelse conviction ==
Dean Carelse was a South African national and water polo coach. Carelse was employed at MFAC from ~2019-2020, as a middle school science and mathematics teacher and a water polo coach. He was dismissed from the college after allegations of grooming after contacting students on social media such as Facebook, and allegedly taking inappropriate photographs of students. Maroochydore Police raided his Moololabah home in early 2021 and discovered child exploitation content, in 2022 he pleaded guilty to 20 charges consisting of possessing child exploitation material and distributing child exploitation material. Much of the child exploitation charges related to students at MFAC. Carelse was sentenced to 6 years in prison, but instead deported to South Africa. After an investigation conducted by the ABC, Carelse was discovered working at a water park in the United Kingdom and departed from there in 2024.

This controversy caused MFAC to implement more stringent and effective child protection policies, as well as the introduction of frequent school assemblies regarding child protection. School policies such as requiring teaching staff to maintain zero contact with students for at least 2 years after graduation were implemented to address the controversy and ensure child protection.
