= Sunshine Coast Grammar School =

Location
- Forest Glen, Queensland; Australia; 26°41′2″S 153°0′26″E

Information
- Type: Independent, co-educational, day school
- Motto: Strength of Purpose
- Denomination: Presbyterian and Methodist
- Established: 1997
- Principal: Anna Owen
- Enrolment: ~1,220 (P–12)
- Colours: Gold, maroon, navy blue and green
- Website: www.scgs.qld.edu.au

The Sunshine Coast Grammar School is a private Christian school located in Forest Glen, a town on Queensland's Sunshine Coast.

The school has a student body of over 1200, from prep to grade 12. The school was established in 1997. It is owned by Presbyterian and Methodist Schools Association, which operates several other schools in Queensland.

Despite its name, the school is not a Grammar School established under either the Grammar Schools Act 1860 or the Grammar School Act 2016, distinguishing it from earlier established Grammar Schools in Brisbane, Ipswich, Rockhampton, Toowoomba, and Townsville. In 2016, the Queensland Parliament defined Grammar Schools to exclude "Sunshine Coast Grammar School." The legislation forbids a person from "establish[ing] or operat[ing] a non-grammar school under a name that includes the word ‘grammar’" and makes it an offence to "hold out a non-grammar school to be a grammar school." The legislation nevertheless permits Sunshine Coast Grammar School to retain its name.

== History ==
The School was originally started as a non-denominational educational institute, by the founding headmaster John Burgess.

The Presbyterian and Methodist Schools Association purchased the school from Burgess after he was forced to relinquish financial possession of the school. Nigel Fairbairn took over from the Presbyterian and Methodist Schools Association's Dr Evans.

On 1 July 2006 the school officially opened its Early Learning Centre for children 6 weeks old to school age. This added to the size of the school area-wise.

On 2 June 2008, the school flooded after an overnight deluge of rain. The overnight rain came on top of the rain from the prior week. No major incidents were reported, although one car was caught in a creek at the school. The Maxwell Foley Centre for Excellence was built in 2013 and named after the former student's contributions to the Grammar School's community.

== Motto ==
Sunshine Coast Grammar School's motto is "Where Passion Meets Purpose".

== Academia ==
Sunshine Coast Grammar School separates its student body into four parts: Early Learning, Junior, Middle and Senior. They cover the traditional school years of kindergarten to preschool, year 1 to year 6, year 7 to year 9 and year 12 In the Senior School, Year 10 students face a difficult curriculum, to prepare them to meet the state-regulated "Senior Education and Training Plan", which leads students to set their direction, i.e., choose a career area.

In 2003, students in year 4 won awards for Creative Writing at the Ekka

=== OP results ===
At the end of 2006, there were nine Overall Position (OP) 1s and seven OP 2s awarded to the Year 12s with 33% of the students getting OP 5 or better. These were the top results of any school on the Sunshine Coast.

== Sister schools ==
The school has two sister schools, Mulgrave School in Canada and Seijo Gakuen Junior High School and High School in Japan. Students may participate in student exchange programs with either of these schools.

== Houses ==
The school has four sporting houses which the students are divided into. They are as follows:

House	Bradman	Chisholm	Lawson	Sturt
Colour	Green	Navy blue	Maroon	Gold
Named after	Donald Bradman	Caroline Chisholm	Henry Lawson	Charles Sturt
Mascot	Bulldog	Chargers	Henry and Moe Hawk	Leopard

== Sport ==
Both the first XV rugby team and the first XI cricket team have become state champions, by competing in the Ballymore Cup and Australia Post cricket competition respectively.

== Notable alumni ==
- Blake Enever, rugby union player
- Carter Gordon, rugby union player
- Jordan Meads, rugby league player
- Tate McDermott, rugby union player

== See also ==
- List of schools in Queensland
