= Buderim House =

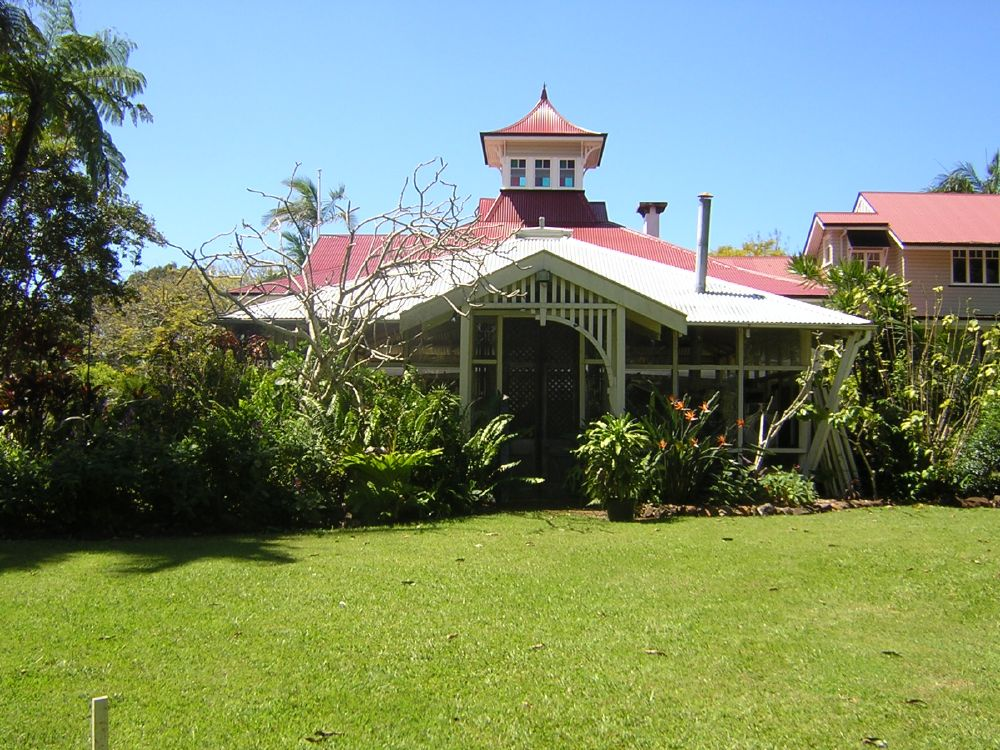
- Buderim House, 2006

- Location within Queensland Location within Australia
- 26.6751°S 153.0577°E
- Location: 10 Orme Road, Buderim, Sunshine Coast Region, Queensland, Australia

History
- Design period: 1914–1919 (World War I)
- Built: c. 1915

Site notes
- Architect: George Trotter

Queensland Heritage Register
- Official name: Buderim House
- Type: state heritage (built)
- Designated: 2 March 1993
- Reference no.: 601176
- Significant period: 1915 (fabric); 1915–1954 (historical)
- Significant components: trees – remnant scrub, farmhouse, belvedere / widow's walk, garden/grounds, trees/plantings
- Builders: Christian Schriver

Buderim House is a heritage-listed homestead at 10 Orme Road, Buderim, Sunshine Coast Region, Queensland, Australia. It was designed by George Trotter and built c. 1915 by Christian Schriver. It was added to the Queensland Heritage Register on 2 March 1993.

== History ==
Buderim House was built c. 1915 for Herbert Victor Fielding, son of pioneer Buderim sugar planter, mill owner and fruit grower John Fielding, who in 1876 selected nearly 49 hectares (120 acres) on the northern slopes of Buderim Mountain.

In the 1880s competition from imported sugar forced Buderim sugar planters into crop diversification, and by the late 1880s, Herbert Fielding was growing bananas on a large scale on the family property. Following John Fielding's death in 1890, the farm, by then reduced to about 40 hectares (99 acres), passed to his wife Jane. When Herbert Fielding acquired the property in 1906, it extended from Orme Road to Mill Road and across the present Gloucester Road to the creek. He was a successful farmer, and in the early 1900s attended statewide agricultural conferences as the representative of the Maroochy Pastoral Agricultural Horticultural and Industrial Association.

He is believed to have erected his first house on the property after his marriage in late 1904. This house and part of the farm was sold c.1915, at which time he erected Buderim House on a 16 hectares (40 acres) section of the property, on the highest point of the northern slope of Mt Buderim, overlooking the Maroochy coast and river valley. The architect was George Trotter of Corinda, and the contractor was Kangaroo Point builder Christian Schriver.

Prior to its completion, the house on about 11 hectares (27 acres) was sold in 1915 to Walter Frank Oakes, who insisted on the addition of a tower, flagpole and the inclusion of the name Buderim House in the leadlight panel in the front door, before the sale could be finalised. Oakes grew bananas on the property. Fielding meanwhile erected a third house on his remaining Gloucester Road farming land, from the same plan as Buderim House.

In 1925 Fielding bought Buderim House and the farm back from Oakes. He worked the farm with bananas, pineapples, winter small crops, coffee, and cattle, and rented out the house until selling it on about 1.6 hectares (4.0 acres) to HJ Murphy in 1927. Murphy, later an alderman in the Maroochy Shire Council, developed the present gardens around the house in the 1930s. He sold the house in 1954, and the land was subdivided further in 1967. The house now stands on about 0.6 hectares (1.5 acres).

In December 1934, the Duke of Gloucester visited Buderim House.

Close to the house a small section of vine scrub, known as Fielding's Scrub, was left as a break against the westerly winds. It remains one of the few vestiges of the dense scrub which covered Buderim Mountain and hindered agricultural development of the area in the 1870s. The cocos palms in this scrub reputedly were seeded by Fielding.

== Description ==
Buderim House, located on a northern slope of Buderim Mountain, sits amongst established gardens which include a section of the original scrub, to the west of the building, which covered the mountain.

The building is a high set timber residence with corrugated iron roof and verandahs to three sides. The corrugated iron roof has a central square belvedere and projecting gables with timber batten panels. The verandah roofs are at a lesser pitch and the belvedere has a ribbed metal, hipped concave roof with finial, curved timber eave brackets and casement windows.

The building has timber stumps with a timber batten skirt below the verandahs. Underneath the building has been enclosed.

Entry is from the northern side via a twin stair to a landing and a single stair to the verandah, which is framed by an arched timber battened valance and brackets. The verandah has battened timber balustrade and timber brackets, and single skin tongue and groove walls with French doors and fanlights. The recessed entry door has art nouveau leadlight fanlight, side lights and central panel with the name BUDERIM HOUSE depicted. The eastern dining room also has leadlight panels. The northeastern verandah has been screened for insects.

Internally, walls are single skin, with some rooms being wallpapered. Most rooms have boarded ceilings, with the living room and hall having plastered ceilings with decorative cornices. Internal doors have fretwork panels above, with the living room doors from the front and rear halls having leadlight panels. A steep internal stair leads from the front hall to the belvedere.

The southwest verandah has been enclosed with chamferboards and casement windows, and a skillion roofed store and covered stair have been added to the southeast.

The gardens contain an informal arrangement of lush, sub-tropical planting with a gravel driveway winding through clumps of established palms and sections of lawn.

== Heritage listing ==
Buderim House was listed on the Queensland Heritage Register on 2 March 1993 having satisfied the following criteria.

The place is important in demonstrating the evolution or pattern of Queensland's history.

Buderim House demonstrates the principal characters of a substantial early 20th century Queensland timber residence. It exhibits particular aesthetic characteristics valued by the Buderim community, these being its landmark quality and the contribution of the house, established gardens and rare scrub remnant, to the Buderim landscape.

The place demonstrates rare, uncommon or endangered aspects of Queensland's cultural heritage.

It exhibits particular aesthetic characteristics valued by the Buderim community, these being its landmark quality and the contribution of the house, established gardens and rare scrub remnant, to the Buderim landscape.

The place is important in demonstrating the principal characteristics of a particular class of cultural places.

Buderim House demonstrates the principal characters of a substantial early 20th century Queensland timber residence.

The place is important because of its aesthetic significance.

It exhibits particular aesthetic characteristics valued by the Buderim community, these being its landmark quality and the contribution of the house, established gardens and rare scrub remnant, to the Buderim landscape.
