= Palmwoods-Buderim Tramway =

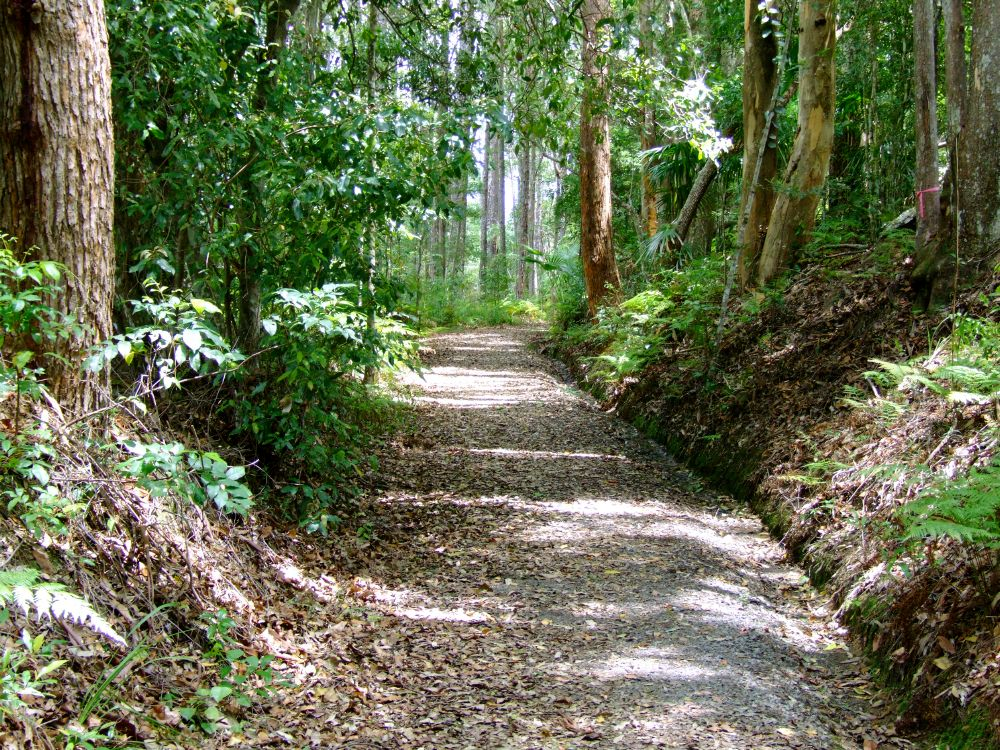
- Route of the Palmwoods-Buderim Tramway, 2009

- Location within Queensland Location within Australia
- 26.6911°S 153.0226°E
- Location: Telco Road, Buderim, Sunshine Coast Region, Queensland, Australia

History
- Design period: 1900–1914 (early 20th century)
- Built: 1914–1935

Queensland Heritage Register
- Official name: Palmwoods to Buderim Tramway Track Foundation and Formwork Remnants
- Type: state heritage (landscape, built)
- Designated: 28 July 2000
- Reference no.: 601711
- Significant period: 1914–1935 (historical); 1914–ongoing (social)
- Significant components: formation – tramway, trees/plantings, cutting – tramway, culvert – tramway, footings

The Palmwoods-Buderim Tramway is a heritage-listed former tramway at Telco Road, Buderim, Sunshine Coast Region, Queensland, Australia. It was built from 1914 and operated until 1935. It was added to the Queensland Heritage Register on 28 July 2000.

== History ==
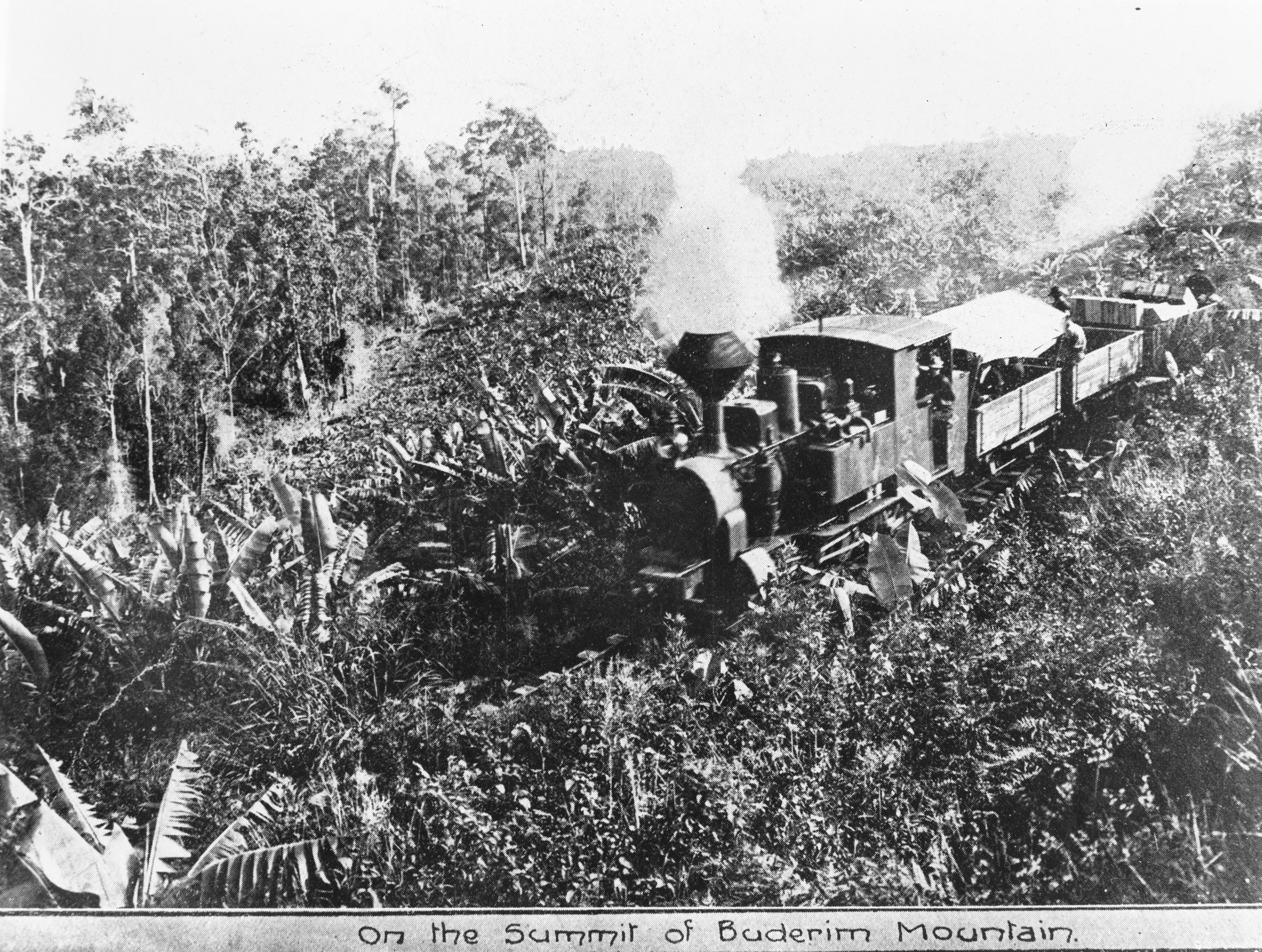
Steam locomotive on the new Buderim tramway on the summit of Buderim Mountain, 1915

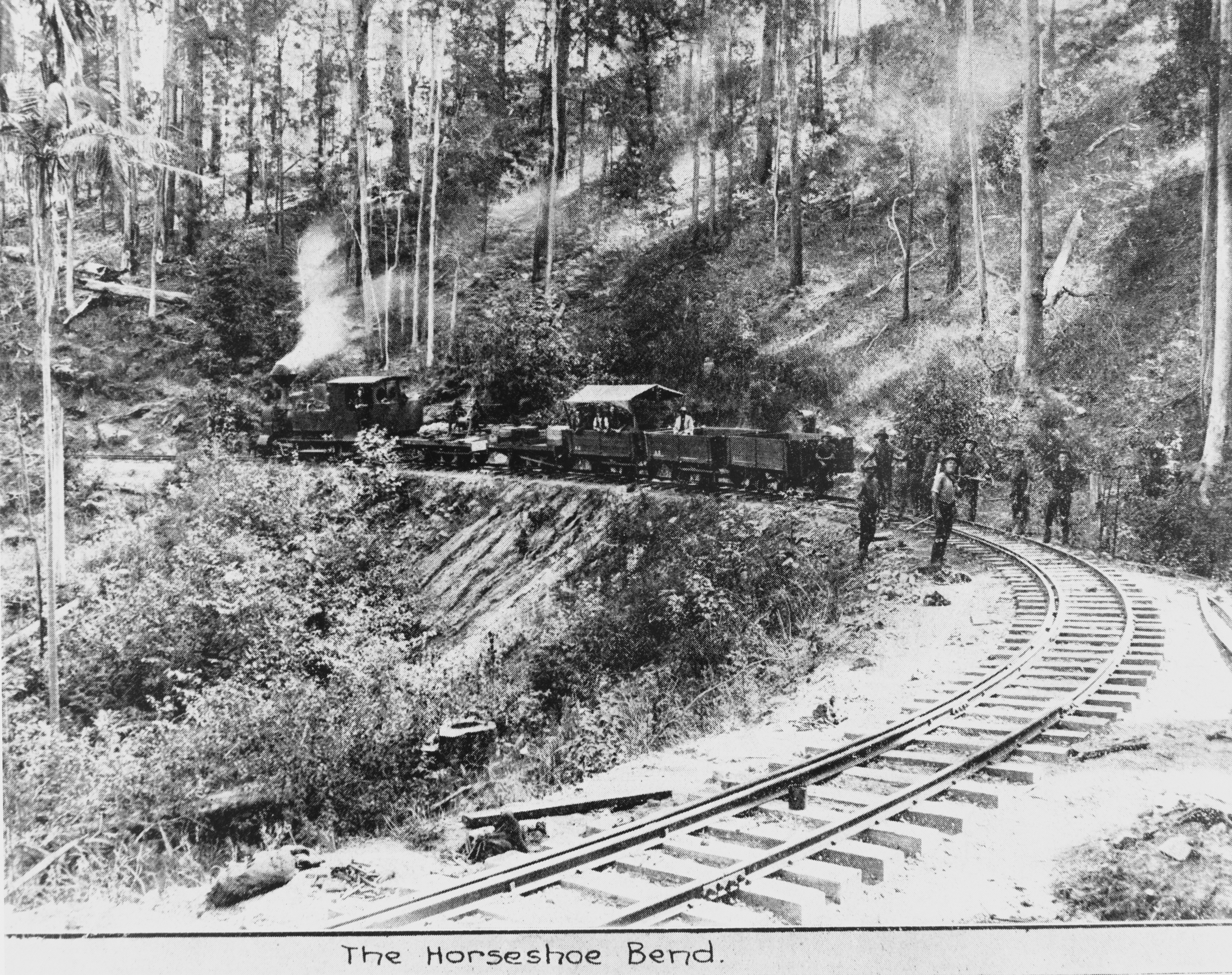
Steam locomotive on the horseshoe bend in the new Buderim tramway, 1915

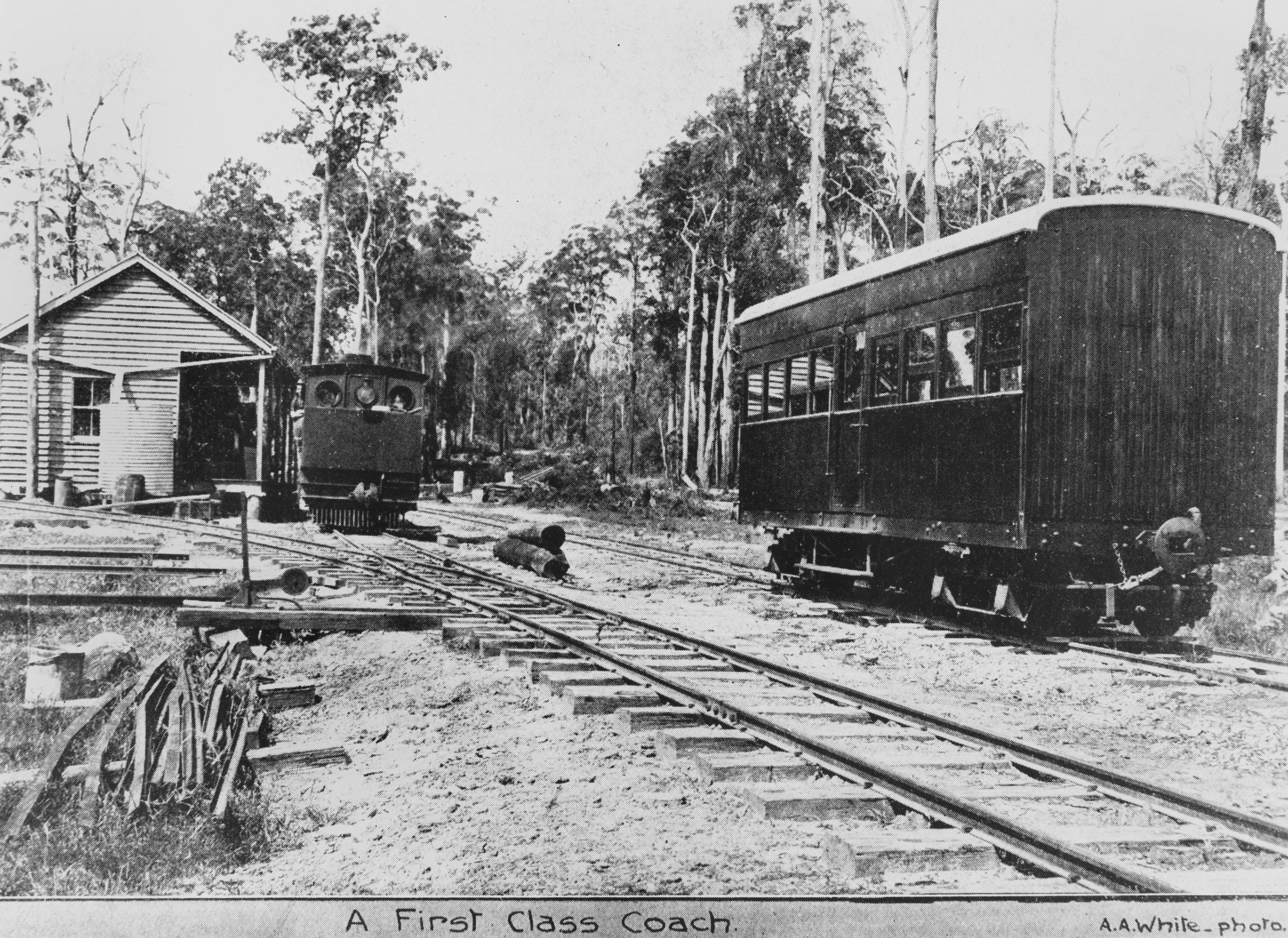
First Class Coach on the new Buderim tramway, circa 1915

The Palmwoods-Buderim Tramway began operations in December 1914 and provided the impetus for substantial settlement expansion and economic growth in the Buderim area. It was constructed as a "private" tramway, and continued to operate until August 1935. The length of the line was seven miles fifteen chains (11.6 km), which ran from the Palmwoods railway station across undulating country to Forest Glen on the Bruce Highway, and then climbed to the top of Buderim Mountain.

Queensland's coastal areas north of Brisbane, and the hinterland, (now known as the Sunshine Coast) developed rapidly in the 1880s. At Buderim, a settlement which developed to service the local farmers, was established by the late 1880s. Shipping of farm and fruit produce from Buderim and surrounds by coastal steamer was complicated by problems with the bar and silting of the Mooloolah and Maroochy rivers. There was great competition in the region, and between regions, for development investment, with the port of Maryborough to the north being a rival for vital road funds.

Government railway building began in Queensland in the 1860s and a Gympie to Maryborough section was opened on the North Coast railway line in 1881. An extension from Brisbane through Palmwoods north to Yandina was completed in 1891. The line was neither coastal nor western, lying between Buderim, the Lower Maroochy River, and the Blackall Ranges. However, poor roads hindered access to the railway. The roads up the steep slopes to Buderim were difficult to negotiate, especially in wet weather.

Maroochy Shire Council established a committee in 1903 to consider the possibility of a tramway to Buderim. Differences arose between supporters of the Buderim-Palmwoods link, the Buderim-Woombye link, and those lobbying to join with the Moreton sugar mill tramway system near Diddillibah, causing negotiations to continue for some time. During this time, the Maroochy Council purchased tramway lines from the Moreton mill in 1910, and using a government tramways loan of £27 000, extended the line (2 ft or 610 mm) from Nambour to Mapleton west. Finally, an Order in Council for the establishment of the Palmwoods/Buderim tramway was reported on 29 July 1911 in "The Queenslander".

The tramway began operations on 1 December 1914 and was officially opened by the Minister for Railways on 18 June 1915. The official party and many others travelled to Buderim on the tram for the ceremony in the School of Arts. With this steady means of transport the Buderim area boomed. The Nambour Chronicle of 16 August 1935 reported that fruit production increased enormously, land values rose to great heights and further land was taken up by settlers at high prices. The tram, to cope with the traffic, had frequently to make two trips a day.

The tram became a central feature in the area it serviced. It assumed importance for all social facets of the community, as well as the primary economic purposes. Expectant mothers were driven to the Buderim Station by horse gig to travel to Palmwoods and thence by train to Nambour, to await the birth in one of the maternity nursing homes, there being no hospitals in the region. Passengers from the Vise Road area would be driven in a gig to Telko Station to go to Palmwoods, either to visit Brisbane or Nambour, and then on return by the tram they would get off at Mons Station, to climb the slope and steps up to Mons Road and higher to the present Mons School Road. There was no direct road access to the Mons Station from Mons Road. Loveday records that Mons Station was "a mere shed with no visible means of approach". Other social uses for the tram included transport to sporting and recreation events, while throughout the depression days those who were drawing the "dole" would travel by tram and then train to Woombye to collect their sustenance allowance.

Patrons of the tramway included more than the local population. Passengers from Brisbane would travel to Palmwoods to meet the tram and then journey to Buderim. The tram consisted of perhaps some thirteen wagons, one passenger coach and a guard/brake van, pulled behind a German Krauss or American Shay steam engine. The flat-top wagons had fruit cases placed down their centres along which planks of timber were arranged to form central seats. In this manner about 150 passengers could be carried each trip. and at times two trips per day were made. The visitors would stay in one of the Buderim Guest/Boarding Houses, or travel down to the coast.

The tramway began to lose money in the 1920s through lower farm output with less freight revenue, in addition to the effects of a new network of main road transport introducing competition. Other possible influences were that the operations began during World War I, curtailed any planned extensions to economically rationalise the line. A Queensland Survey Office map of the Buderim tramway shows hand drawn lines indicating, perhaps, two alternative track extensions to Maroochydore. Such plans failed during the economic depression of the 1930s. In 1933, the tramway actually ceased to operate for a short period because repairs were needed on the engine operating at that time and there was no balance in the tram working account. The Great Depression possibly added to all other factors to seal the fate of the tramway.

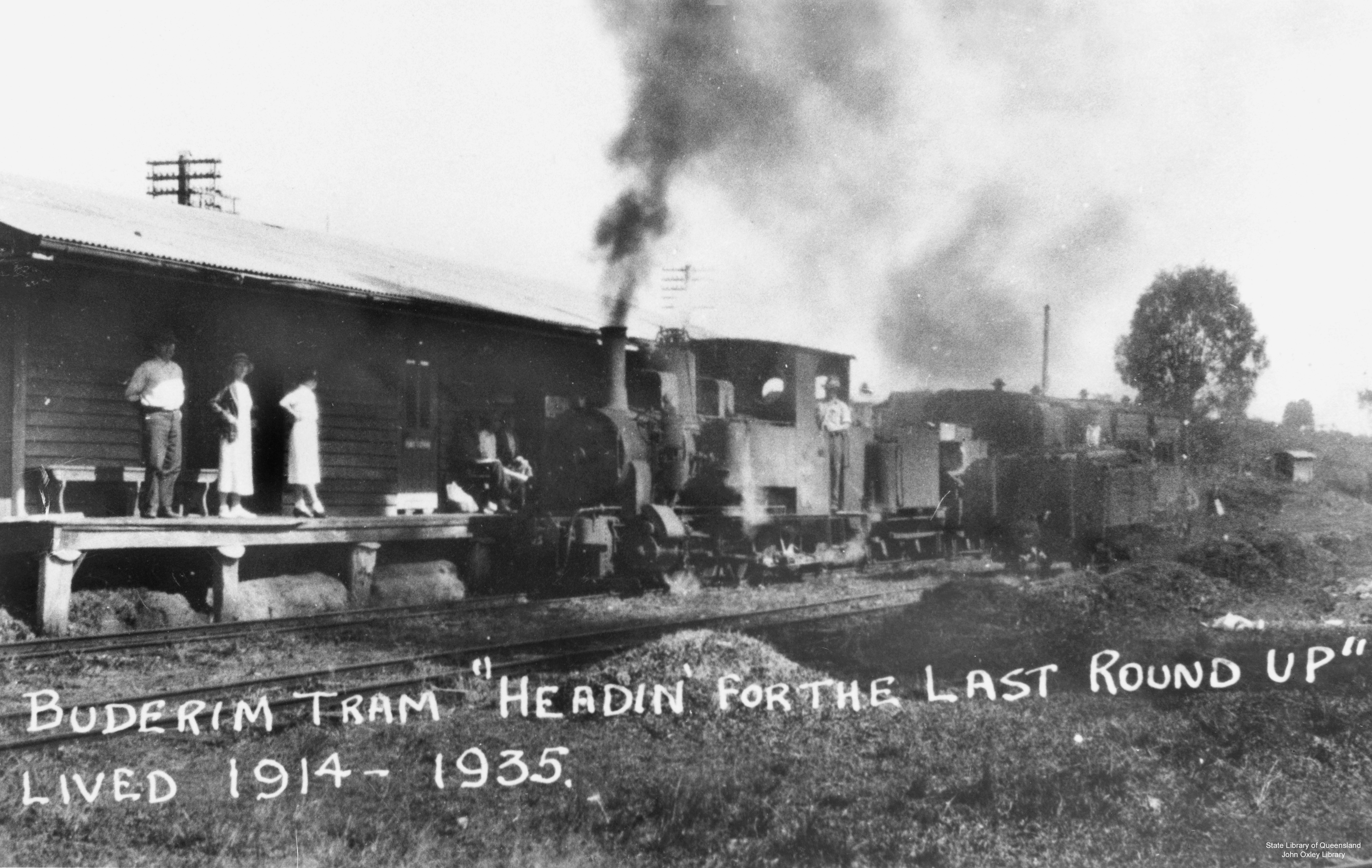
Last journey for the Buderim Tram, 1935

The final run of the Buderim tram occurred on 10 August 1935. The last duty of the Buderim tram was to assist in dismantling the railway by delivering the rails, which had been sold to the Moreton Sugar Mill Co., to Palmwoods. Only the rails and engines are recorded as being sold, but the sleepers, bridges and most buildings were also removed at the time or later.

The Palmwoods-Buderim Tramway was constructed across some technically difficult terrain as a narrow gauge railway of 2 ft 6 in (762 mm) gauge. This differed to the 3 ft 6 in (1,067 mm) gauge of Queensland Government Rail and the 2 ft (610 mm) gauge of sugar mill trams. The tramway was also a private tramway in that while owned by Council, the Maroochy Shire Council had applied for a government tramway loan and then the 130 ratepayers in the area benefiting from the tramway were levied additional rates to service and repay the loan. The project cost £34 000, of which £21 000 was raised by the loan. The repayment of the loan continued until 1971 when the total had amounted to £84 000.

Palmwoods railway station has been much modified since the closure of the line. Electrification of the main line to Nambour in 1988 has removed most signs of both the engine shed to the south and the track which reputedly returned to climb northerly to parallel the still serviceable "Buderim loop" of the government rail near the present car park.

The Buderim-Palmwoods Heritage Tramway Inc was established in 2003 to develop a heritage walking track along the tramway and to recover and restore tramway artefacts.

== Description ==
The remnants of the Palmwoods-Buderim Tramway consists of segments of the track foundation and the associated form-work on both public land (the original easements) and on private property, where easements have been purchased, or where access is through private property.

The tramway track leaves the "Buderim loop", in the Palmwoods Station yard near the present passengers' car park, and moves north to the unknown site of the former engine shed. From the shed it apparently reversed in a turning triangle and then descended to a lower level (between three and four metres below the main line), to exit the station yard where it can be discerned to the east opposite the station building and then clearly as an embankment crossing Palmwoods Creek, before proceeding across the junction of the Chevallum and Nicklin roads to cross the Bowling Club property. Remains of a small bridge are found on private property some seventy metres from the eastern boundary, after which the track turns east across a dam wall, possibly for tram water supply, and then a lagoon wall formed by the embankment, over the remains of a probable cattle-grid, and then the remaining embankment is breached as it crosses Nicklin Road into suburban development.

Track earth-work continues for about thirty-six metres after Nicklin Road, then it disappears below housing sites. It continues beyond Lot 2 Nicklin Road for twenty-three metres of embankment ending at a small water-course where there appears to be no sign of bridge remains. However some ten square concrete posts of about one metre, which show signs of having been cemented about half a metre in the ground, are scattered at this location, but it is considered unlikely they are remnants of the track. Lawn and gardens cover the track site, which most likely followed the contours of the area before it exits the developed area crossing Old Chevallum Road through the drive entrance to number five, into a deep cutting up to seven and a half metres in depth, known as Kelly's Cutting. A local resident reports that this cutting was originally bridged over by the road, but it is now filled in to carry Old Chevallum Road, although the cutting still exists for about eighty-two metres to the east.

From Old Chevallum Road, the track is discernible, but overgrown with growth such as lantana in quite heavy tree cover until about 270 metres (890 ft) from Cheviot Road, where it is then clear, and sections are used as tracks through private fenced land. Tree growth on and beside the track is considerable in some areas. East of Cheviot Road, a private drive uses the track, passing what appears to be a tram dam to the south. and a residence is built near the first possible siding site. It was reported that when the residence was built about 1988 remains of building stumps were noted. The residence has a track cutting beside it which has a small modern bridge over it and a water tank in it. The track continues some 270 metres (890 ft) beyond the residence to the next property boundary where the remains of a small bridge or cattle grid have been pushed aside. Considerable surface modification is apparent in this next property with little evidence of the track from the western boundary. There appears to be little track remaining in this section.

The next property contains the extractive industrial area being operated by Queensland Sand Mining Pty Ltd situated either side of Eudlo Creek, and located at the northern end of this southern section of Winston Road South. Immediately to the west of the entrance gates to the mine are the remains of the bridges over the Eudlo anabranch and the Eudlo Creek itself. Chevallum Station was located about where the entrance gates are now, approximately 550 metres (1,800 ft) from Chevallum Road. The track has been obliterated through mining activities for some distance to both the west and east of the creek but appears again after the mining area. It is then apparent to the east through the adjacent timbered property and it re-emerges with more cuttings on the next property, where a portion is used as a drive going to Chevallum Road.

A large strawberry farm is traversed next, with some over-growth on the western side, but a clear cutting with a modern road bridge infill is apparent near the large farm machinery shed. The cutting, about two metres deep, is clear for about 193 metres (633 ft) to the west of the bridge and forty-five metres to the east. The track turns to the north about 182 metres (597 ft) to the east of the bridge. It seems likely that the possible siding known locally as Green Ridge was located on this site.

Some remains are seen in the swampy ground in the next property, and then the track proceeds through the Land Rover garage to cross Chevallum Road and the Bruce Highway to the location of the original Forest Glen Station. General earth work indications appear to exist but there has been much surface modification.

The track crosses Owen Creek Road. and the drive of the property on the corner of Mons Road. and Owen Creek Road uses it for a short distance, after which it is rather over-grown until it turns away from Mons Road and exits this property. It then is well cleared as it moves through private land behind the Forest Glen Holiday Resort and commences the steady climb to Buderim.

The track from here to Telco Road appears to be on public land after leaving the water tank on the track near the residence behind the Forest Glen Resort. Sections of this most dramatic section of the track include a disintegrated cattle grid between Mons and Forest Glen, and collapsed culverts. Other features of this section are deep double- and single-sided cuttings of eight or nine metres depth through solid sandstone, sharp corners, high embankments of up to perhaps twenty to thirty metres in height, (both single and double sided), with substantial stands of varied timber with palms, ginger, orchids and other plants widely spread.

The track runs along another dam wall shortly before Telco Road where the original road bridge is now gone and the track is filled in. Telko Station was immediately to the east of Telco Road. After this location the White Telko trestle bridge remains are found. Only the earth embankments at either side, with a few vertical bridge timber beams remain at track level, with some concrete footings and timber remains down the bank and at creek level. The bridge is on private property and the later cutting housing a poultry run. Cuttings through solid sandstone, single and double sided of three to four metres in depth, continue as the track turns around the hill and then across another dam wall, with the dam to the north assumed to be for tram use, then beneath a residence built on the track, and up a section used as a drive, to cross Mons Road.

After crossing Mons Road where the track is only suggested through some possibly utilised earth levels, it moves below the road to Settlers Ridge, where the cutting has been filled in, to parallel Brecon Creek. It continues climbing through the undergrowth until it becomes the drive to a Brecon Creek residence built on the easement, and then turns east to Guy Siding located behind the present kindergarten. The track then crosses Tulip Lane beneath number eleven which is built on the easement, and to the north of number fourteen on the other side of the street before entering a well maintained section of cutting and embankment, near a private residence in Sage Street, where it is still bounded by the original stone walls in some places. The embankment ends as the track enters the side boundary of number fourteen Royal Drive.

Development has then erased the track for some distance. Perhaps it crosses at about 34 Pine Street, where Falkland Court enters, but it can be clearly traced again as it moves behind the rear of the house yard of number six Norfolk Way following the row of pine trees, which were planted on it when the rails were removed, to the south of the 1995 extensions of Lindsay Gardens. Finally, it then disappears towards the site of the present Post Office. A small sign near the present croquet building records the site where the station and post office originally stood.

== Heritage listing ==
Palmwoods-Buderim Tramway was listed on the Queensland Heritage Register on 28 July 2000 having satisfied the following criteria.

The place is important in demonstrating the evolution or pattern of Queensland's history.

The tramway, through the transport and communication facilities it provided, played a central role in the development of the region, and as such is important in demonstrating the pattern of Queensland's history. The tramway was a specific response to the economic and social pressures encountered by Australian settlers at a particular phase of the twentieth century. The influence of World War I and the following economic depression on the establishment, operation and closure of the tramway is also of historical significance. The tramway was funded by the local council, and remained under the control of the Maroochy Shire Council for the entire period of its operation.

The place demonstrates rare, uncommon or endangered aspects of Queensland's cultural heritage.

The tramway demonstrates an uncommon aspect of Queensland's cultural heritage as a track with a gauge of 2 ft 6 in (762 mm), and being of private construction.

The place is important because of its aesthetic significance.

The environment through which the tramway track moves is of considerable aesthetic appeal. particularly in the steeper hilly section, lending the place aesthetic significance. The appeal of the environment is complemented by the technological grandeur of the construction modifications to the landscape, especially as they were achieved in a horse-powered era. There remains a pleasing unity in the track remnants.

The place has a strong or special association with a particular community or cultural group for social, cultural or spiritual reasons.

The place has a special association with the local communities serviced by the tramway for social and cultural reasons. The tramway, as the transportation hub for the region, facilitated community participation in sporting and cultural events, and provided a connection to Nambour and Brisbane.

== See also ==
- List of tramways in Queensland
