= Immanuel Lutheran College, Buderim =

Immanuel Lutheran College

Location
- Sunshine Coast; Buderim, Queensland; Australia; 26°40′31″S 153°4′53″E

Information
- Type: Independent
- Religious affiliation: Lutheran Church of Australia
- Established: 1979; 47 years ago
- Principal: Eloise Beveridge
- Enrolment: 1200+
- Colours: Navy and gold
- Website: www.immanuel.qld.edu.au

Immanuel Lutheran College (ILC) is a co-educational Christian private school in Buderim, a suburb of the Sunshine Coast Region in Queensland, Australia.

== Notable former students ==
- Alana Boyd, Australian representative to the 2012 Olympics in Athletics
