= List of schools in Sunshine Coast, Queensland =

This is a list of schools in the Shire of Noosa (Noosa) and the Sunshine Coast Region (Sunshine Coast) of Queensland, Australia, including both the urban areas and surrounding hinterland. Prior to 2015, the Queensland education system consisted of primary schools, which accommodated students from Kindergarten to Year 7 (ages 5–13), and high schools, which accommodated students from Years 8 to 12 (ages 12–18). However, from 2015, Year 7 became the first year of high school.

== State schools ==
=== State primary schools ===
State primary schools
Name	Suburb	LGA	Opened	Coords	Refs
Baringa State Primary School	Baringa	Sunshine Coast	2018	26.8081°S 153.0825°E	
Beerburrum State School	Beerburrum	Sunshine Coast	1918	26.9569°S 152.9572°E	
Beerwah State School	Beerwah	Sunshine Coast	1888	26.8554°S 152.9399°E	
Bli Bli State School	Bli Bli	Sunshine Coast	1901	26.6137°S 153.0319°E	
Brightwater State School	Mountain Creek	Sunshine Coast	2012	26.7091°S 153.1115°E	
Buddina State School	Buddina	Sunshine Coast	1979	26.7021°S 153.1331°E	
Buderim Mountain State School	Buderim	Sunshine Coast	1875	26.6845°S 153.0538°E	
Burnside State School	Burnside	Sunshine Coast	1978	26.6304°S 152.9475°E	
Caloundra State School	Caloundra	Sunshine Coast	1889	26.7971°S 153.1350°E	
Chancellor State College	Sippy Downs	Sunshine Coast	1997	26.7213°S 153.0594°E	
Chevallum State School	Chevallum	Sunshine Coast	1921	26.6966°S 152.9894°E	
Conondale State School	Conondale	Sunshine Coast	1912	26.7294°S 152.7186°E	
Coolum State School	Coolum Beach	Sunshine Coast	1917	26.5350°S 153.0783°E	
Cooran State School	Cooran	Noosa	1890	26.3406°S 152.8241°E	
Cooroy State School	Cooroy	Noosa	1909	26.4140°S 152.9114°E	
Currimundi State School	Currimundi	Sunshine Coast	1977	26.7776°S 153.1355°E	
Elimbah State School	Elimbah	Sunshine Coast	1915	27.0127°S 152.9424°E	
Eudlo State School	Eudlo	Sunshine Coast	1897	26.7264°S 152.9581°E	
Eumundi State School	Eumundi	Sunshine Coast	1893	26.4730°S 152.9521°E	
Federal State School	Federal	Noosa	1910	26.3929°S 152.7943°E	
Glass House Mountains State School	Glass House Mountains	Sunshine Coast	1910	26.9055°S 152.9494°E	
Glenview State School	Glenview	Sunshine Coast	1878	26.7656°S 153.0136°E	
Golden Beach State School	Golden Beach	Sunshine Coast	1983	26.8144°S 153.1168°E	
Kenilworth State Community College	Kenilworth	Sunshine Coast	1924	26.5991°S 152.7257°E	
Kin Kin State School	Kin Kin	Noosa	1916	26.2624°S 152.8718°E	
Kuluin State School	Kuluin	Sunshine Coast	1987	26.6598°S 153.0579°E	
Landsborough State School	Landsborough	Sunshine Coast	1879	26.8040°S 152.9645°E	
Maleny State School	Maleny	Sunshine Coast	1913	26.7607°S 152.8553°E	
Mapleton State School	Mapleton	Sunshine Coast	1899	26.6259°S 152.8658°E	
Maroochydore State School	Maroochydore	Sunshine Coast	1921	26.6529°S 153.0845°E	
Montville State School	Montville	Sunshine Coast	1896	26.6886°S 152.8930°E	
Mooloolaba State School	Mooloolaba	Sunshine Coast	1933	26.6784°S 153.1137°E	
Mooloolah State School	Mooloolah Valley	Sunshine Coast	1894	26.7690°S 152.9582°E	
Mountain Creek State School	Mountain Creek	Sunshine Coast	1994	26°41′27″S 153°6′12″E	
Nambour State College (Junior School)	Nambour	Sunshine Coast	1879	26.6212°S 152.9646°E	
Nirimba State Primary School	Nirimba	Sunshine Coast	2022	26.8222°S 153.0540°E	
Noosaville State School	Noosaville	Noosa	1996	26.4095°S 153.0291°E	
North Arm State School	North Arm	Sunshine Coast	1885	26.5232°S 152.9657°E	
Pacific Paradise State School	Pacific Paradise	Sunshine Coast	1992	26.6142°S 153.0793°E	
Palmview State Primary School	Palmview	Sunshine Coast	2021	26.7419°S 153.0713°E	
Palmwoods State School	Palmwoods	Sunshine Coast	1889	26.6933°S 152.9467°E	
Peachester State School	Peachester	Sunshine Coast	1892	26.8437°S 152.8825°E	
Peregian Springs State School	Peregian Springs	Sunshine Coast	2010	26.5003°S 153.0721°E	
Pomona State School	Pomona	Noosa	1897	26.3679°S 152.8606°E	
Sunshine Beach State School	Sunshine Beach	Noosa	1982	26.4027°S 153.1023°E	
Talara Primary College	Currimundi	Sunshine Coast	1998	26.7724°S 153.1179°E	
Tewantin State School	Tewantin	Noosa	1875	26.3901°S 153.0325°E	
Wamuran State School	Wamuran	Sunshine Coast	1921	27.0407°S 152.8618°E	
Woodford State School	Woodford	Sunshine Coast	1892	26.9617°S 152.7806°E	
Woombye State School	Woombye	Sunshine Coast	1885	26.6677°S 152.9738°E	
Yandina State School	Yandina	Sunshine Coast	1899	26.5522°S 152.9579°E	

=== State high schools and colleges ===
State high schools and colleges
Name	Suburb	LGA	Opened	Coords	Refs
Baringa State Secondary College	Baringa	Sunshine Coast	2021	26.8051°S 153.0770°E	
Beerwah State High School	Beerwah	Sunshine Coast	1992	26.8627°S 152.9540°E	
Burnside State High School	Burnside	Sunshine Coast	1979	26.6304°S 152.9472°E	
Caloundra State High School	Caloundra	Sunshine Coast	1967	26.7938°S 153.1255°E	
Chancellor State College	Sippy Downs	Sunshine Coast	2004	26.7146°S 153.0683°E	
Coolum State High School	Coolum Beach	Sunshine Coast	1985	26.5019°S 153.0862°E	
Kawana Waters State College	Bokarina	Sunshine Coast	1987	26.7409°S 153.1264°E	
Maleny State High School	Maleny	Sunshine Coast	1987	26.7657°S 152.8569°E	
Maroochydore State High School	Maroochydore	Sunshine Coast	1964	26.6547°S 153.0755°E	
Mary Valley State College	Imbil	Sunshine Coast	2002	26.4617°S 152.6792°E	
Meridan State College	Meridan Plains	Sunshine Coast	2006	26.7737°S 153.1028°E	
Mountain Creek State High School	Mountain Creek	Sunshine Coast	1995	26.6881°S 153.1029°E	
Nambour State College	Nambour	Sunshine Coast	1953	26.6232°S 152.9623°E	
Noosa District State High School	Cooroy	Noosa	1963	26.4242°S 152.9102°E	
Noosa District State High School - Pomona Campus	Pomona	Noosa	1996	26.3527°S 152.8636°E	
Palmview State Secondary College	Palmview	Sunshine Coast	2023	26.7399°S 153.0703°E	
Sunshine Beach State High School	Sunshine Beach	Noosa	1992	26.4104°S 153.1007°E	

=== Special state schools ===
This table includes special schools (schools for children with disabilities) and schools for specific purposes:

Special state schools
Name	Suburb	LGA	Opened	Coords	Refs
Currimundi Special School	Dicky Beach	Sunshine Coast	1984	26.7779°S 153.1359°E	
Palmview State Special School	Palmview	Sunshine Coast	2021	26.7424°S 153.0736°E	
Nambour Special School	Burnside	Sunshine Coast	1977	26.6329°S 152.9458°E	

=== Defunct state schools ===
Defunct State Schools
Name	Suburb	LGA	Opened	Closed	Approximate Coords	Refs
Belli Park State School	Belli Park	Sunshine Coast	1909	1963		
Bellthorpe State School	Bellthorpe	Sunshine Coast	1927	1969		
Bellthorpe West State School	Bellthorpe West	Sunshine Coast	1953	1969	26°49′23″S 152°40′45″E	
Black Mountain State School	Black Mountain	Noosa	1913	1961	26°25′18″S 152°50′47″E	
Bokarina State School	Bokarina	Sunshine Coast	1987	2006	26°44′27″S 153°7′35″E	
Booroobin State School	Booroobin	Sunshine Coast	1919	1953		
Boreen Junction State School	Boreen Point	Noosa	1909	1947	26°19′37″S 152°54′15″E	
Cambroon State School	Cambroon	Sunshine Coast	1923	1944	26°38′33″S 152°41′14″E	
Commissioners Flat State School	Commissioners Flat	Sunshine Coast	1912	1977	26°51′59″S 152°49′51″E	
Coochin Creek State School	Coochin Creek	Sunshine Coast	1952	1962		
Coolabine State School	Coolabine	Sunshine Coast	1928	1956	26°36′7″S 152°46′12″E	
Cooloolabin State School	Cooloolabin	Sunshine Coast	1915	1962	26°33′18″S 152°53′45″E	
Cooloothin Creek State School	Ringtail Creek / Cootharaba	Noosa	1915	1936	26°18′29″S 152°58′5″E	
Cooroy West State School	Cooroy	Noosa	1911	1962		
Cootharaba Lake State School	Cootharaba	Noosa	1909	1943	26°15′52″S 152°58′16″E	
Cootharaba Road State School	Cootharaba	Noosa	1894	1965	26°10′9″S 152°43′3″E	
Crohamhurst State School	Crohamhurst	Sunshine Coast	1913	1960	26°48′37″S 152°52′18″E	
Curramore State School	Curramore	Sunshine Coast	1913	1939	26°41′22″S 152°47′11″E	
Diamond Valley State School	Diamond Valley	Sunshine Coast	1927	1936	26°45′21″S 152°55′34″E	
Diddillibah State School	Diddillibah	Sunshine Coast	1885	1962	26.6472°S 153.0249°E	
Doonan State School	Doonan	Noosa	1919	1954	26.4545°S 153.0126°E	
Dulong State School	Dulong	Sunshine Coast	1895	1967	26.6361°S 152.8861°E	
Eerwah Vale State School	Eerwah Vale	Sunshine Coast	1925	1963	26.4723°S 152.8948°E	
Elaman Creek State School	Elaman Creek	Sunshine Coast	1940	1960	26.7173°S 152.77232°E	
Flaxton State School	Flaxton	Sunshine Coast	1922	1967	26.65916°S 152.88194°E	
Hunchy State School	Hunchy	Sunshine Coast	1924	1969	26.6748°S 152.8994°E	
Ilkley State School	Ilkley	Sunshine Coast	1901	1964	26.71629°S 152.99710°E	
Kareewa State School	Cootharaba	Noosa	1898	1933		
Kenilworth Lower State School	Gheerulla	Sunshine Coast	1900	1959	26.5621°S 152.7673°E	
Kiamba State School	Kiamba	Sunshine Coast	1927	1964	26.57324°S 152.90027°E	
Kidaman (Kidamann) Creek State School	Kidaman Creek	Sunshine Coast	1914	1959	26.63081°S 152.76746°E	
Kiels Mountain State School	Kiels Mountain (now in Diddillibah)	Sunshine Coast	1918	1962	26.6471°S 152.9967°E	
Kin Kin Junction State School	Kin Kin	Noosa	1909	1981	26.2841°S 152.8764°E	
Kureelpa State School	Kureelpa	Sunshine Coast	1914	1967	26.6179°S 152.9011°E	
Maleny North State School	North Maleny	Sunshine Coast	1897	1953		
Maroochy River State School	Maroochy River	Sunshine Coast	1911	1972	26.5785°S 153.0109°E	
Mill School	Lake Cootharaba	Noosa	1874	1892		
Mons State School	Mons	Sunshine Coast	1916	1974		
Moran Group State School	near Kin Kin	Noosa	1910	1952	26.2207°S 152.8819°E	
Nambour State Infants School	Nambour	Sunshine Coast	1961	1980		
Obi Obi State School	Obi Obi	Sunshine Coast	1901	1959	26.6362°S 152.8100°E	
Perwillowen Creek State School	Perwillowen	Sunshine Coast	1916	1959	26.6384°S 152.9256°E	
Pinbarren Creek State School	Pinbarren	Noosa	1905	1939		
Ringtail State School	Cootharaba	Noosa	1912	1943	26.3493°S 152.9336°E	
Ridgewood State School	Ridgewood	Sunshine Coast	1916	1961	26.4532°S 152.8251°E	
Rosemount State School	Rosemount	Sunshine Coast	1886	1946	26.62824°S 152.99589°E	
Stanmore State School	Stanmore	Sunshine Coast	1891	1972	26.8935°S 152.7818°E	
Tinbeerwah State School	Tinbeerwah	Noosa	1914	1963	26.4004°S 152.9602°E	
Valdora State School	Valdora	Sunshine Coast	1918	1949	26.5472°S 153.0049°E	
Verrierdale State School	Verrierdale	Sunshine Coast	1916	1963	26.4847°S 152.9932°E	
Wahpunga State School	Kin Kin	Noosa	1910	1967	26.2375°S 152.9079°E	
Witta State School	Witta	Sunshine Coast	1892	1974	26.7086°S 152.8268°E	
Wootha State School	Wootha	Sunshine Coast	1886	1949		
Yandina Creek State School	Yandina Creek	Sunshine Coast	1901	1964	26.5115°S 153.0169°E	

== Private schools ==
=== Catholic schools ===
In Queensland, Catholic primary schools are usually (but not always) linked to a parish. Prior to the 1970s, most schools were founded by religious institutes, but as these institutes' membership declined, and as the Church underwent major reforms, lay teachers and administrators began to take over the schools; this process was completed by approximately 1990.

Schools in the Sunshine Coast region are administered by the Catholic Education Office, Archdiocese of Brisbane. The CEO is supported by the Queensland Catholic Education Commission, which coordinates administration, curriculum, and policy across the Catholic school system. Enrolment preference is given to Catholic students from the parish or local area, although non-Catholic students are admitted if room is available.

Catholic schools
Name	Suburb	LGA	Gender	Years	Opened	Coords	Refs
Good Samaritan Catholic College	Bli Bli	Sunshine Coast	Co-ed	P–12	2019	26.5952°S 153.0204°E	
Notre Dame College	Bells Creek	Sunshine Coast	Co-ed	P–12	2025	26.8291°S 153.0634°E	
Our Lady of the Rosary Primary School	Shelly Beach	Sunshine Coast	Co-ed	P–6	1977	26.7972°S 153.1437°E	
Siena Catholic College	Sippy Downs	Sunshine Coast	Co-ed	7–12	1997	26.7160°S 153.0568°E	
Siena Catholic Primary School	Sippy Downs	Sunshine Coast	Co-ed	P–6	2001	26.7158°S 153.0573°E	
St John's College	Burnside near Nambour	Sunshine Coast	Co-ed	7–12	1940	26.6379°S 152.9449°E	
St Joseph's Primary School	Nambour	Sunshine Coast	Co-ed	P–6	1925	26.6300°S 152.9601°E	
St Teresa's Catholic College	Noosaville	Noosa	Co-ed	7–12	2004	26.4064°S 153.0323°E	
St Thomas More Catholic Primary School	Sunshine Beach	Noosa	Co-ed	P–6	1990	26.4059°S 153.1017°E	
Stella Maris Catholic Primary School	Maroochydore	Sunshine Coast	Co-ed	P–6	1980	26.6537°S 153.0718°E	

=== Independent schools ===
Most independent schools cater for students from Preparatory to Year 12.

Name	Suburb	LGA	Gender	Years	Category	Opened	Coords	Refs
Blackall Range Independent School	Kureelpa	Sunshine Coast	Co-ed	P–12	No religious affiliation	1975	26°37′4″S 152°54′2″E	
Caloundra Christian College	Caloundra	Sunshine Coast	Co-ed	P–12	Baptist	1983	26°48′0″S 153°7′7″E	
Caloundra City Private School	Pelican Waters	Sunshine Coast	Co-ed	P–12	No religious affiliation	2005	26°49′28″S 153°6′11″E	
Coolum Beach Christian College	Coolum Beach	Sunshine Coast	Co-ed	P–12	Christian	2004	26°32′6″S 153°2′47″E	
Glasshouse Christian College	Beerwah	Sunshine Coast	Co-ed	P–12	Baptist	2000	26°51′39″S 152°57′8″E	
Good Shepherd Lutheran College	Noosaville	Noosa	Co-ed	P–12	Lutheran	1986	26°24′31″S 153°2′57″E	
Immanuel Lutheran College	Buderim	Sunshine Coast	Co-ed	P–12	Lutheran	1979	26°40′30″S 153°4′52″E	
Kairos Community College	Caloundra	alternative	Co-ed	10–12		2020	27°11′33″S 153°1′36″E	
Matthew Flinders Anglican College	Buderim	Sunshine Coast	Co-ed	P–12	Anglican	1989	26°41′56″S 153°3′35″E	
Montessori International College	Forest Glen	Sunshine Coast	Co-ed	P–12	Montessori	1982	26°40′16″S 153°0′27″E	
Montessori Noosa	Sunshine Beach	Sunshine Coast	Co-ed	P–6	Montessori	2017	26°24′18″S 153°5′56″E	
My Independent School (MIS)	Beerwah	Sunshine Coast	Co-ed	7–11	Independent		26°51′19″S 152°57′27″E	
Nambour Christian College	Woombye	Sunshine Coast	Co-ed	P–12	Christian	1980	26°38′38″S 152°57′41″E	
Noosa Adventist College	ooroy	Noosa	Co-ed	P–12	Adventist	2003	26°25′36″S 152°54′13″E	
Noosa Flexible Learning Centre	Sunshine Beach	Catholic alternative	Co-ed	7–12		2007	26°24′25″S 153°6′3″E	
Noosa Pengari Steiner School	Doonan	Noosa	Co-ed	P–12	Steiner	1996	26°27′11″S 153°1′56″E	
OneSchool Global	Nambour	Sunshine Coast	Co-ed	3–12	Exclusive Brethren	2003	33°47′13″S 151°1′55″E	
Pacific Lutheran College	Meridan Plains	Sunshine Coast	Co-ed	P–12	Lutheran	2001	26°45′27″S 153°6′15″E	
Peregian Beach College	Peregian Beach	Sunshine Coast	Co-ed	P–12	No religious affiliation	2002	26°28′42″S 153°4′8″E	
St Andrew's Anglican College	Peregian Springs	Sunshine Coast	Co-ed	P–12	Anglican	2003	26°29′43″S 153°4′35″E	
Suncoast Christian College	Woombye	Sunshine Coast	Co-ed	P–12	Christian	1979	26°39′53″S 152°58′39″E	
Sunshine Coast Grammar School	Forest Glen	Sunshine Coast	Co-ed	P–12	Uniting	1997	26°41′8″S 153°0′18″E	
The Industry School	Maroochydore		Co-ed	10–12	No religious affiliation	2022	26°39′12″S 153°5′23″E	
The River School	Maleny	Sunshine Coast	Co-ed	P–6	Ananda Marga	1995	26°44′1″S 152°50′37″E	
Unity College	Caloundra West	Sunshine Coast	Co-ed	P–12	Catholic/Uniting	2006	26°48′7″S 153°5′23″E	

=== Defunct private schools ===
Name	Suburb	LGA	Category	Opened	Closed	Approximate Coords	Refs
Maleny Independent School	Maleny	Sunshine Coast	Independent	2018	Before 2024	26.7171°S 152.8176°E	
Multi-Disciplinary Academy Grammar School	Noosaville	Noosa	Independent	1988	1988		
St Patrick's School	Pomona	Noosa	Catholic	1947	1971		

== Higher education ==
=== Universities ===
Name	Suburb	LGA	Opened	Coords	Refs
University of the Sunshine Coast	Sippy Downs	Sunshine Coast	1994	26.7171°S 153.0631°E	

== See also ==
- List of schools in Queensland
- List of schools in Greater Brisbane
- List of schools in Wide Bay-Burnett
