= Tanawha, Queensland =

Tanawha
- Suburb
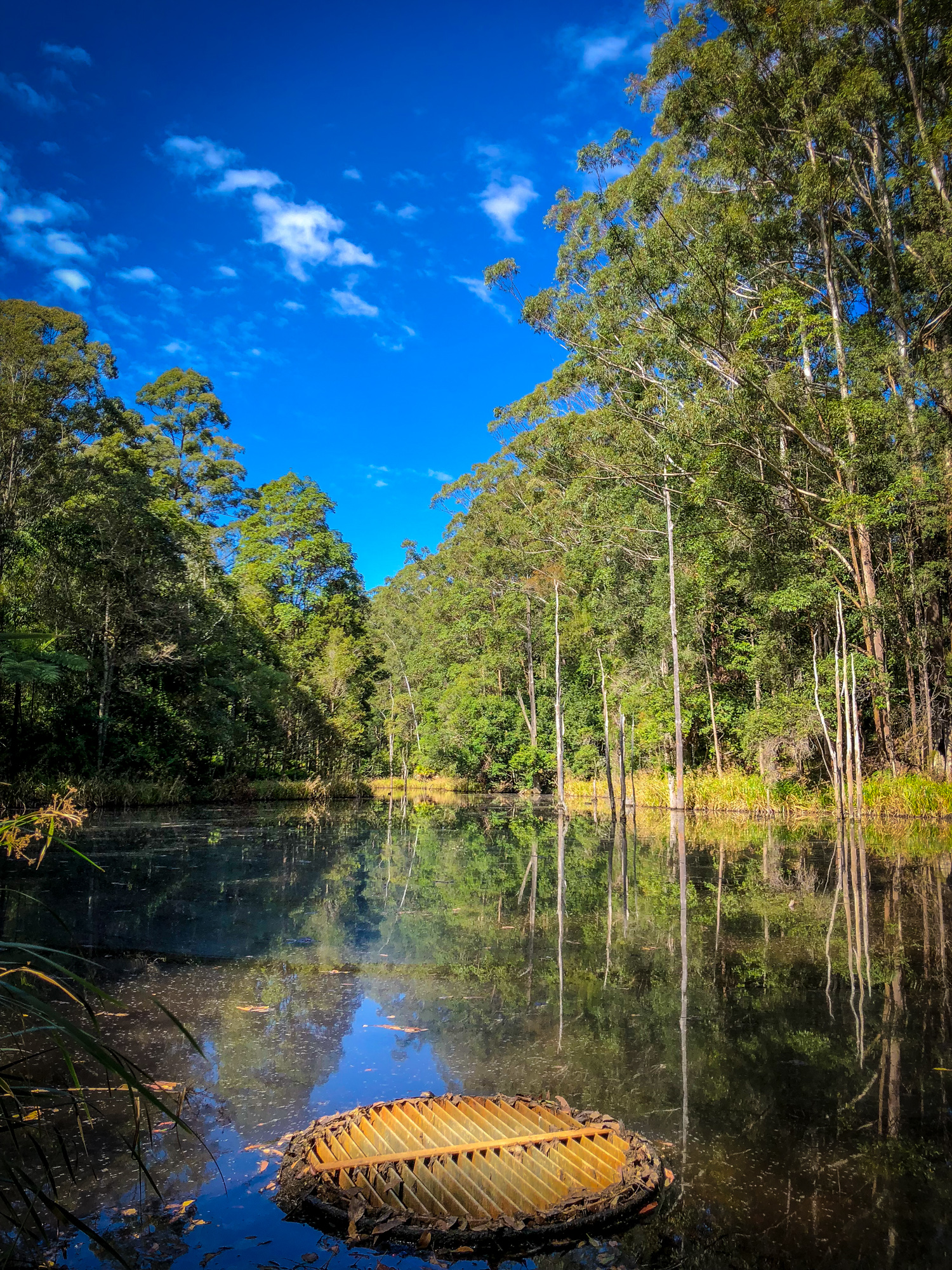
- Lagoon at Maroochy Bushland Botanical Gardens, 2018

- Interactive map of Tanawha
- Coordinates: 26.7152°S 153.0344°E
- Country: Australia
- State: Queensland
- City: Sunshine Coast
- LGA: Sunshine Coast Region
- Location: 4.3 km (2.7 mi) SW of Buderim; 11.4 km (7.1 mi) SW of Maroochydore; 13.6 km (8.5 mi) SE of Nambour; 17.7 km (11.0 mi) NW of Caloundra CBD; 89.5 km (55.6 mi) N of Brisbane CBD

Government
  - State electorates: Buderim; Nicklin
  - Federal divisions: Fisher; Fairfax

Area
  - Total: 12.8 km^{2} (4.9 sq mi)

Population
  - Total: 1,312 (2021 census)
  - Density: 102.5/km^{2} (265.5/sq mi)
- Time zone: UTC+10:00 (AEST)
- Postcode: 4556
- County: Canning
- Parish: Mooloolah
Suburbs around Tanawha
Forest Glen	Mons	Buderim
Chevallum	Tanawha	Sippy Downs
Ilkley	Glenview	Palmview

Tanawha (pronounced /'tæn-uh-wuh/) is a rural locality in the Sunshine Coast Region, Queensland, Australia. It is a suburb of Buderim. The name Tanawha is believed to be a Māori language word referring to a legendary New Zealand monster. In the 2021 census, Tanawha had a population of 1,312 people.

== Geography ==
Tanawha is in the Sunshine Coast hinterland and is part of the Buderim urban centre. It is home of the Tanawha Tourist Drive.

The Bruce Highway passes through from south-east to north-west, and the Sunshine Motorway runs to the east. The eastern boundary includes a short length of the Bruce Highway and a short length of the Sunshine Motorway.

== History ==
The locality is believed to be named using a Maori language word referring to a legendary New Zealand monster Taniwha.

Tanawha Tourist Drive was the former Bruce Highway until 16 November 1989 when the Tanawha Deviation opened to traffic.

Frank Cunning (son of William Cunning junior, a pioneer of the Tanawha district) was a local timber cutter. He operated sawmills at Kiel Mountain (1960), Forest Glen (1968) and Nambour (1973). He cut timber for railway sleepers. He also had a 100-hectare (250-acre) cattle property along Sippy Creek.

Bellingham Maze opened in 1993 and has added more attractions over time.

The Maroochy Regional Bushland Botanic Garden was opened on 1 December 2001.

Calvary Christian Church was built from brick in 2009.

== Demographics ==
- In the 2016 census, Tanawha had a population of 1,327 people.
- In the 2021 census, Tanawha had a population of 1,312 people.

== Education ==
There are no schools in Tanawha. The nearest government primary schools are:

- Chancellor State College in neighbouring Sippy Downs to the east
- Buderim Mountain State School in neighbouring Buderim to the north-east
- Chevallum State School in neighbouring Chevallum to the west
- Eudlo State School in Eudlo to the south-west
- Glenview State School in neighbouring Glenview to the south

The nearest government secondary school is Chancellor State College in neighbouring Sippy Downs.

== Amenities ==
Calvary Christian Church is at 212 Crosby Hill Road (26.709736°S 153.0457°E). It is affiliated with the Australian Christian Churches.

== Attractions ==
Amaze World (formerly known as the Bellingham Maze) provides a hedge maze, puzzle-oriented games, and mini-golf at 274 Tawawha Tourist Drive (26.7115°S 153.0329°E).

The Maroochy Regional Bushland Botanic Garden is located in Tanawha, showcasing plants that are native to the Sunshine Coast. It is on Palm Creek Road (26.7196°S 153.0236°E).

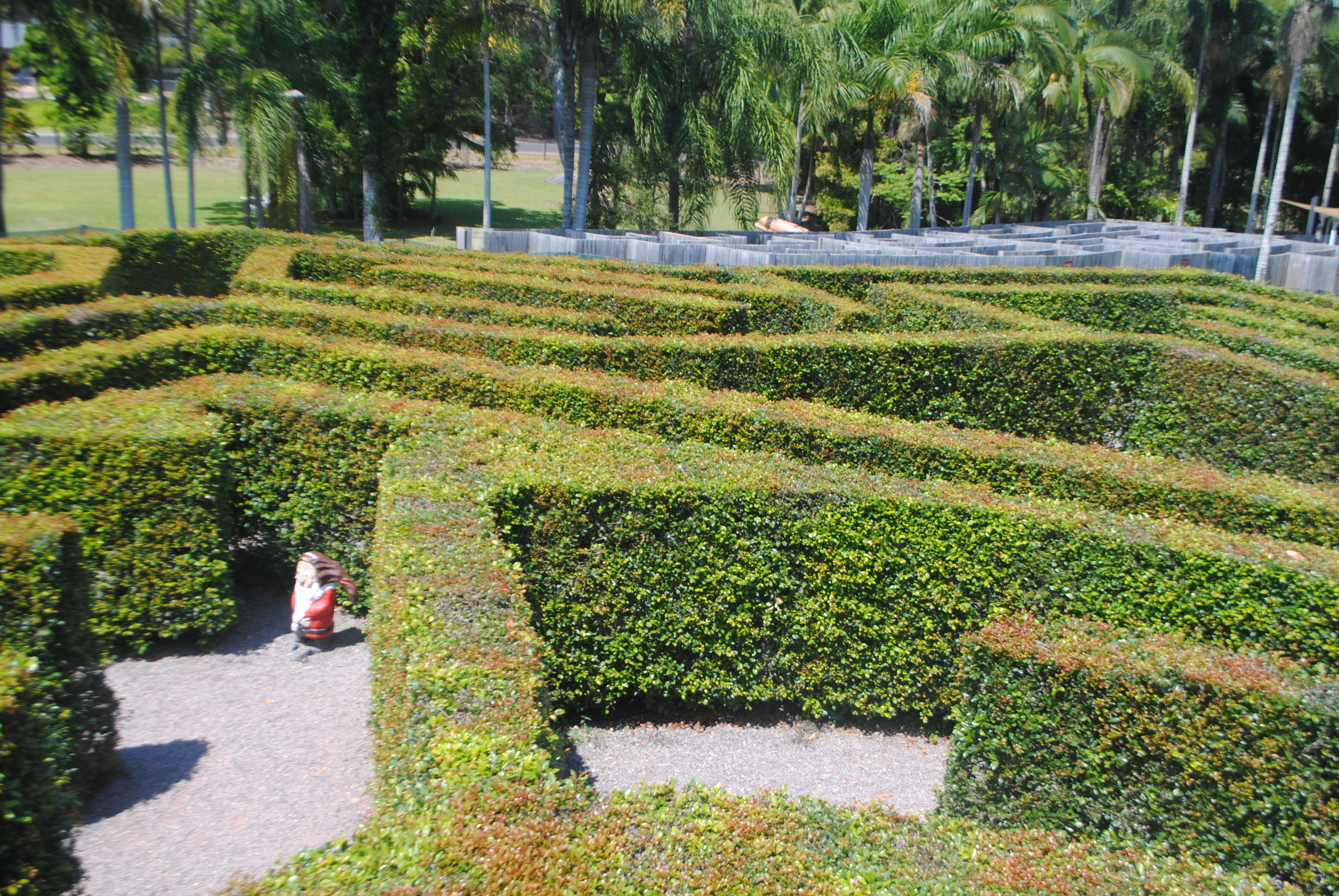
Bellingham Maze, 2015

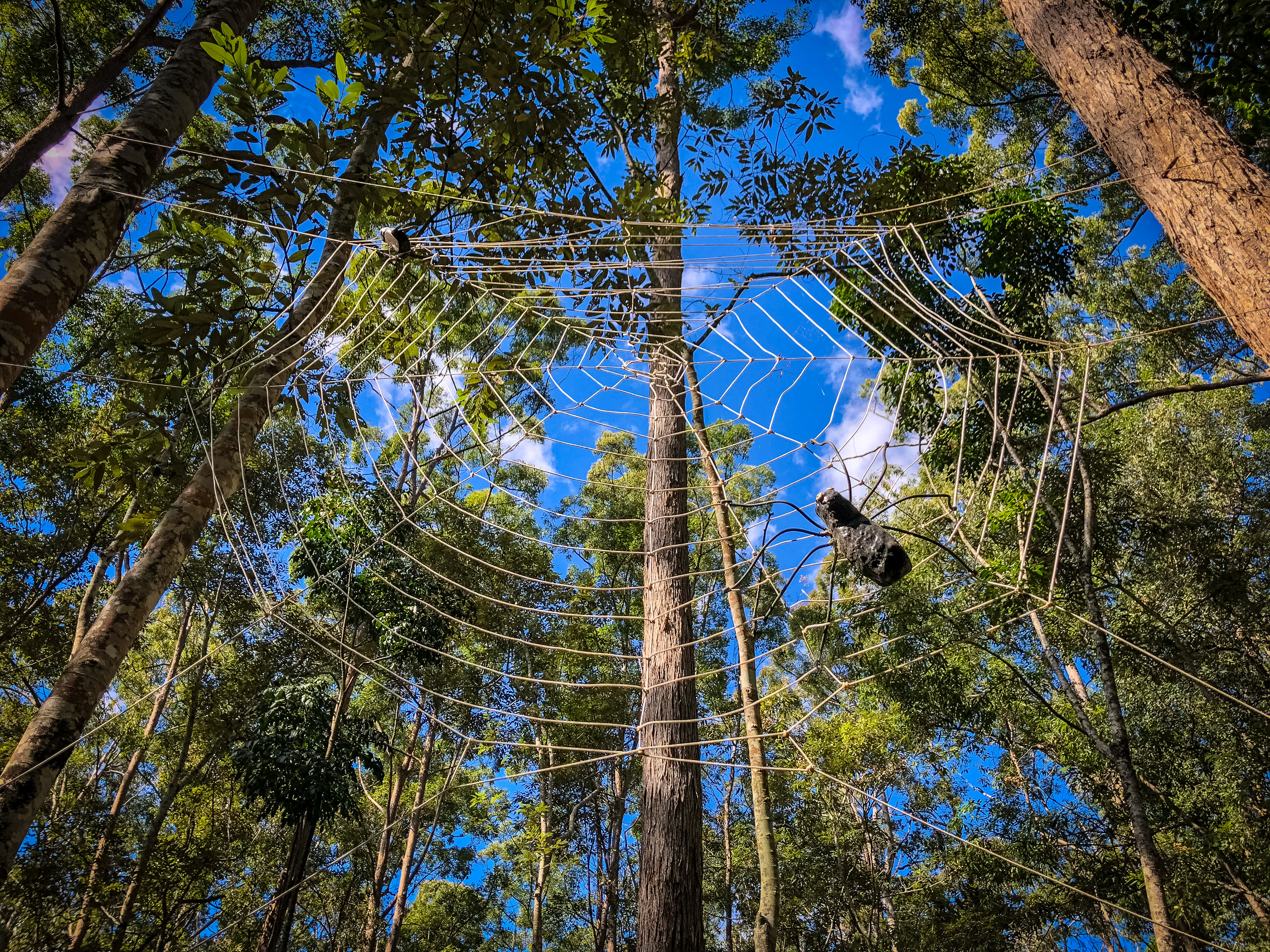
Spiders web art, Maroochy Bushland Botanical Gardens
