= North Coast Roadside Rest Areas =

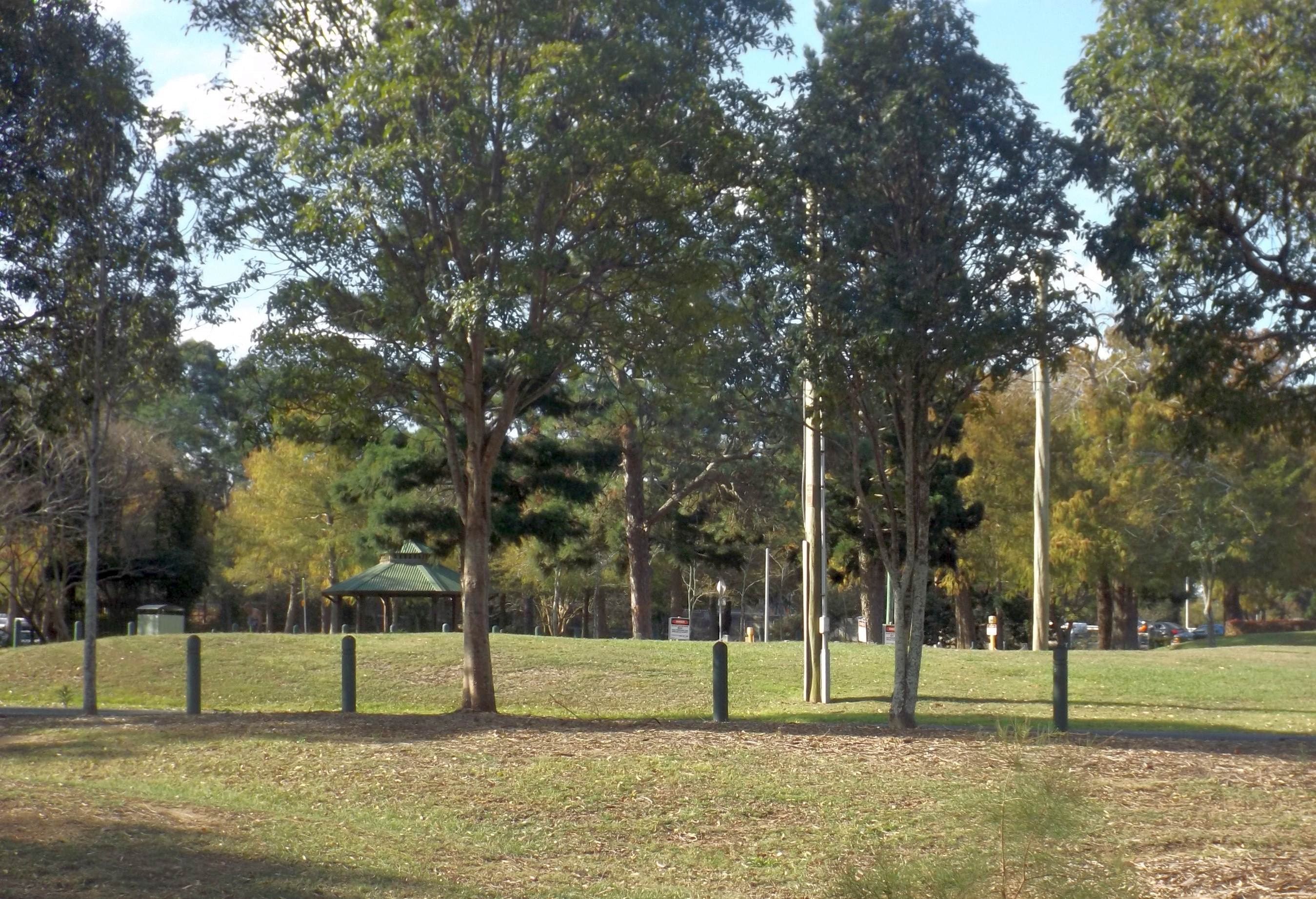
- Grassed area, Petrie Road Rest Area, 2016

- Location within Queensland Location within Australia
- Location: Gympie Road, Petrie, City of Moreton Bay; Steve Irwin Way, Glenview, Sunshine Coast Region; Nambour Connection Road, Woombye, Sunshine Coast Region, all in Queensland, Australia

Queensland Heritage Register
- Official name: North Coast Roadside Rest Areas, Petrie Road Rest Area, Jowarra Road Rest Area, Paynter's Creek Rest Area, Wyllie Park
- Type: state heritage (landscape, built)
- Designated: 5 February 2009
- Reference no.: 602698
- Significant period: Post-war mass motoring

The North Coast Roadside Rest Areas are a group of three heritage-listed rest areas in Queensland, Australia. They are (from north to south):

- Paynter's Creek Roadside Rest Area at Nambour Connection Road, Woombye, Sunshine Coast Region (26.6556°S 152.9679°E)
- Jowarra Roadside Rest Area at Steve Irwin Way, Glenview, Sunshine Coast Region (26.7735°S 153.0379°E)
- Petrie Roadside Rest Area (also known as Wyllie Park) at 980 Gympie Road, Petrie, City of Moreton Bay (27.2728°S 152.9804°E)

They were added to the Queensland Heritage Register on 5 February 2009.

== History ==
The roadside rest areas, constructed by the Main Roads Commission (MRC) from the early 1950s on the old Bruce Highway and on roads feeding onto the highway (at Petrie; Jowarra, Landsborough; Paynter's Creek, Woombye) represent a pattern of development of the tourist industry in Queensland intrinsically linked to the rise of motor transport Australia-wide in the second half of the 20th century.

The early 1920s heralded the beginnings of increasing car ownership in Queensland. In 1921, the year registration was introduced in Queensland, there was estimated to be approximately 8,000 motor vehicles in the state. By mid-1923 nearly 17,000 cars were registered. While the demographic of ownership was broadening, it was still very much confined to the affluent. Nonetheless, as more people took to the car, the need for serviceable roads for motor vehicles became apparent.

The Queensland Government responded with the establishment of the Queensland Main Roads Board in 1920. Prior to this, the onus was on local shire councils to fund road construction and management. They were largely unable to provide the finances or technical skills to respond to challenges posed by increased car use. After the Board's establishment, co-operative funding arrangements occurred with local councils, who generally maintained roads after their construction. The initial policy of the Main Roads Board was to construct roads that operated as feeders to railway networks and aided the development of newly settled and existing districts. By the end of 1921, the Main Roads Board were surveying and designating main roads throughout the State.

Improvements to road networks during the interwar period strongly influenced the development of the tourist industry on the North Coast (now known as the Sunshine Coast). During its first decade of operation, a number of key roads were built with Main Roads assistance on the North Coast. The road to Maleny from Landsborough, built in 1921, was the earliest, described in the 1925 edition of From Noosa to the Tweed, "as good as any in the state". Other projects included the road from Palmwoods to Montville and coastal roads to Tewantin, Maroochydore, Coolum and Caloundra.

After many years of agitation by the Great North Coast Road Committee, local authorities and the RACQ, the first declaration of the Bruce Highway, between what is now Rothwell and Eumundi was officially opened in December 1934. By this time, there were nearly 92,000 vehicles in Queensland, mainly concentrated in the south-east corner of the state. The potential for the tourism at North Coast seaside and mountain resorts had been a key factor in the decision by Henry Bruce, Minister for Public Works to allocate Main Roads funds for the road. When first opened, the highway was classified as a "tourist" road. The Main Roads Annual Report of 1937 commented on the "remarkable" progress of North Coast seaside resorts, particularly Maroochydore and Caloundra, since the development of the highway and recorded increased traffic on both the highway and connecting roads.

While pressure was exerted for the construction of the through route connecting northern and southern Queensland, it was resisted on the grounds that the railway serviced the needs of land tourists and business travellers and funds were better spent on development projects throughout the state. Gradually however, the Bruce Highway extended further north. By 1942, the route was bitumen sealed between Brisbane and Eumundi.

During World War II the resources of the Main Roads Commission were concentrated on defence projects through the operations of the Allied Works Council. While Queensland gained over 3,000 kilometres (1,900 mi) of defence-related roads during this period, including sections that became the Bruce Highway, work on the whole route was delayed. For the first few years after the end of the war in 1945, Main Roads resources were scarce. It wasn't until the 1950s that a more concerted effort on the highway could be undertaken. The highway developed incrementally, by 1962 bitumen sealed between Brisbane and Cairns.

The lifting of petrol rationing by the Menzies federal government, the increased affordability of cars for the wider population and longer paid holidays were catalysts for the growth of motor tourism during the 1950s. By the end of the decade, Australia was second only to the United States in terms of car ownership per head of population. In Queensland, car ownership rose from near 100,000 to over 240,000 between 1950 and 1960. It was during this period that provision of "off the road" areas, later known as roadside rest areas, became an important aspect of Main Roads Commission operations. The 1951 Penrods Guide to North Coast Shore and Mountain Resorts listed areas at Petrie on the Pine River, Burpengary Creek, and Paynter's Creek between Woombye and Nambour. For motorists travelling from Brisbane to the North Coast and beyond, the Bruce Highway was accessed at Rothwell, via the Hornibrook Bridge or from the Gympie Rd, via Petrie. The rest area located just south of Petrie township catered for those using the Gympie Road.

In 1952, Main Roads noted the areas were "a factor much appreciated" by motorists. The provision of rest areas was connected to tree planting operations undertaken throughout the state along roads, in towns and at off the road areas. Up to 1952, expenditure on tree planting and "off the road" facilities, was less than one percent of all Main Roads expenditure. The tree plantings and rest areas can be seen as examples of Main Roads moving beyond pure road building objectives, to enhancing journeys for travelling motorists.

Use of rest areas increased during 1953. Motorists wrote letters to Main Roads to thank them for providing areas. The areas were meant for daylight use, although some had begun to be used as overnight camping places by travellers. On-site concrete or stone fireplaces were provided for travellers to "boil the billy", while containing the threat of bushfires that could be caused by makeshift roadside fires. Parks close to the fringes of Brisbane were especially popular. One hundred and ninety-two cars were counted at Petrie Park one Sunday, evidence of their high level of patronage. The following year, the Petrie and Burpengary parks were considered to have reached their carrying capacity on weekends.

Main Road's provision of rest areas expanded as their popularity grew. The 1955 Main Roads Annual Report noted the constant use of areas and their "extreme" popularity, especially with interstate and long- distance travellers. By 1955 a "fairly comfortable" journey could be made from Brisbane to Cairns in five days. The report also drew attention to the positive effects of the areas after a number of years of observation. Drivers were using the areas for breaks during hot weather "thereby increasing their driving efficiency". There was less roadside grassfires and littering. At a national conference of State Road Authorities, other states expressed their interest in Queensland's development of off the road areas, as they were considered to have had made the most progress in this field. The types of land used for these rest areas were divided into four categories; areas severed by resumptions for road works, considered too small to add to adjoining properties purchased by the state; land resumed for road widening, suitable areas on creek and river banks and suitable areas where fine views could be obtained.

Amenities available for travellers at areas were dependent on their size. Smaller areas offered a table and seat and a fireplace, sufficient to stop, eat, drink and continue. Larger areas provided tables and seats in the open and under "rustic" shelters, fireplaces, water tanks (unless on creeks), "swinging" rubbish bins and toilets. A number of areas were extensively planted with trees to make them more attractive.

Rest areas rapidly became a popular roadside accommodation option for a growing type of motorist, the caravan tourist. While caravans were appearing on North Coast resorts by the late 1930s, it wasn't until the 1950s that numbers increased substantially. In the early 1950s, relatively few sites in Queensland offered the infrastructure considered as necessary to accommodate caravanning needs. In 1952, the Nambour Chronicle commented on the lack of caravan parks, noting "several rest areas throughout the North Coast have gone a long way as substitutes" and are well patronised'. These rest areas included Paynter's Creek, constructed by the MRC on approximately 0.5 acres (0.20 ha) in 1951, between Woombye and Nambour; Pine River near Petrie (an MRC picnic, caravan and camping area with water and conveniences) available in 1951; Jowarra Rest Area, between Landsborough and Caloundra, and Nadroya, south of Cooroy. Photographic evidence from 1954 shows that the Paynter's Creek Rest Area was used by caravanners. It wasn't until late 1954 that the first caravan park opened on the North Coast section of the Bruce Highway, the Bamboo All Electric at Forest Glen. By 1953, there were increasing numbers of caravans seen on Queensland roads, mostly originating from Victoria and New South Wales. At this time there were 2,320 registered caravans in Queensland. The basic facilities at rest areas combined with the relative self-sufficiency of caravans meant the need to stay in a town could be avoided. The high usage of particular rest areas by caravans by 1955 led Main Roads to restrict stays to 48 hours to ensure facilities were available for casual users.

High use of rest areas led to continual maintenance, undertaken by Main Roads gangs and in some instances local authorities. At Paynter's Creek in 1954 toilet and rubbish facilities were on site and new tree plantings were also in evidence. Four years later minor improvements to Paynter's Creek Rest Area were noted in the 37th Annual Report of the Main Roads Commissioner. By the early 1960s, MRC had upgraded the rest areas, "Jowarra" on the Bruce Highway-Caloundra intersection, erecting a substantial shelter of concrete and stone; "Nadroya", just south of Cooroy; and Belli Park on the Mary River road, near Kenilworth. A report on the unveiling of a memorial plaque at Matthew Flinders Park by the Speaker of the Queensland Parliament, the Honourable David Nicholson, M.L.A on 27 July 1963, noted that the Main Roads Department cleared and prepared the site for the memorial "which will later be developed as a Rest Area, thus providing an amenity for road travellers at a place of great historical interest to Queensland". This park near the Glass House Mountains had been the site of a basket picnic for the Bruce Highway's official opening by the Hon H.A. Bruce, the Minister for Works on 15 December 1934 and was the site of a cairn and plaque erected in commemoration of this event in 1934.

Between 1957 and 1970 an ongoing reconstruction of the Bruce Highway between Brisbane and Nambour was undertaken. A "spectacular" increase in traffic between Nambour and Brisbane occurred during this period, with 1970 volumes three to four times 1957 figures. A number of new concrete bridges and realignments were completed and a major bypass was completed between Burpengary and Beerburrum. A four lane section of roadway was built between Paynter's Creek Bridge and the Maroochydore turn-off and the townships of Beerwah, Glass House Mountains and Eumundi were bypassed between 1973 and 1975. From its beginnings in 1934 as a virtual service road to North Coast resorts, the Bruce Highway had by the 1970s become increasingly oriented to through traffic heading north.

By 1971 there were 130 Main Roads rest areas in Queensland. A progressive upgrading of roadside amenities was initiated. New structures were planned for several areas and additional sites were under consideration. Three acres was deemed an acceptable minimum size, while design features needed to be flexible to respond to variable topography and environmental conditions throughout the state. Main Roads considered the most important facilities to be septic toilet blocks, water supply and covered rubbish bins.

Upgrading of rest areas gradually continued throughout the 1970s and early 1980s. Main Roads further developed policies to deal with rest area establishment and the implications of increasing demand and usage of these places. Information was gathered to determine rest area characteristics to assist their development to a standard sufficient to attract motorists to pull off the road for rest and relaxation. The 48-hour restriction introduced in 1955 remained in place in 1980, except in some local shires that forbade overnight stays. In 1980 Main Roads distributed its first brochure detailing rest area locations and facilities available on principal roads throughout Queensland.

Between 1980 and the mid-1990s the old Bruce Highway route between the Beerburrum exit and Cooroy was progressively replaced. By 1985 the four-lane roadway between the turn-offs to Beerburrum and Caloundra was completed. Construction extended northward eventually by-passing Nambour, Yandina and Cooroy. The original sections of the highway between the Beerburrum and Caloundra exits and Tanawha-Forest Glen have since become tourist drives, a return to their original designation.

Service station food courts and "Driver Reviver" outlets operating in holiday periods now provide the only opportunities for roadside breaks on the current alignment of the Bruce Highway between Brisbane and Gympie. While the old highway no longer carries the same volume of traffic, the rest areas along the route remain well patronised. While up-dating of facilities has occurred at rest areas, the Main Roads rationale for their provision has remained much the same since the early 1950s. Rest areas provide the motorist with an "attractive park- like area" off the road to take a break from driving, especially long- distance travellers in cars and those with caravans and trailers, with the aim of reducing fatigue related accidents and improving the total travel experience.

In 2008, only the Petrie, Matthew Flinders, Jowarra and Paynter's Creek road rest areas survive. The Matthew Flinders road rest area has been resumed for the Beerburrum to Landsborough Rail Upgrade Project and is scheduled for demolition.

== Description ==
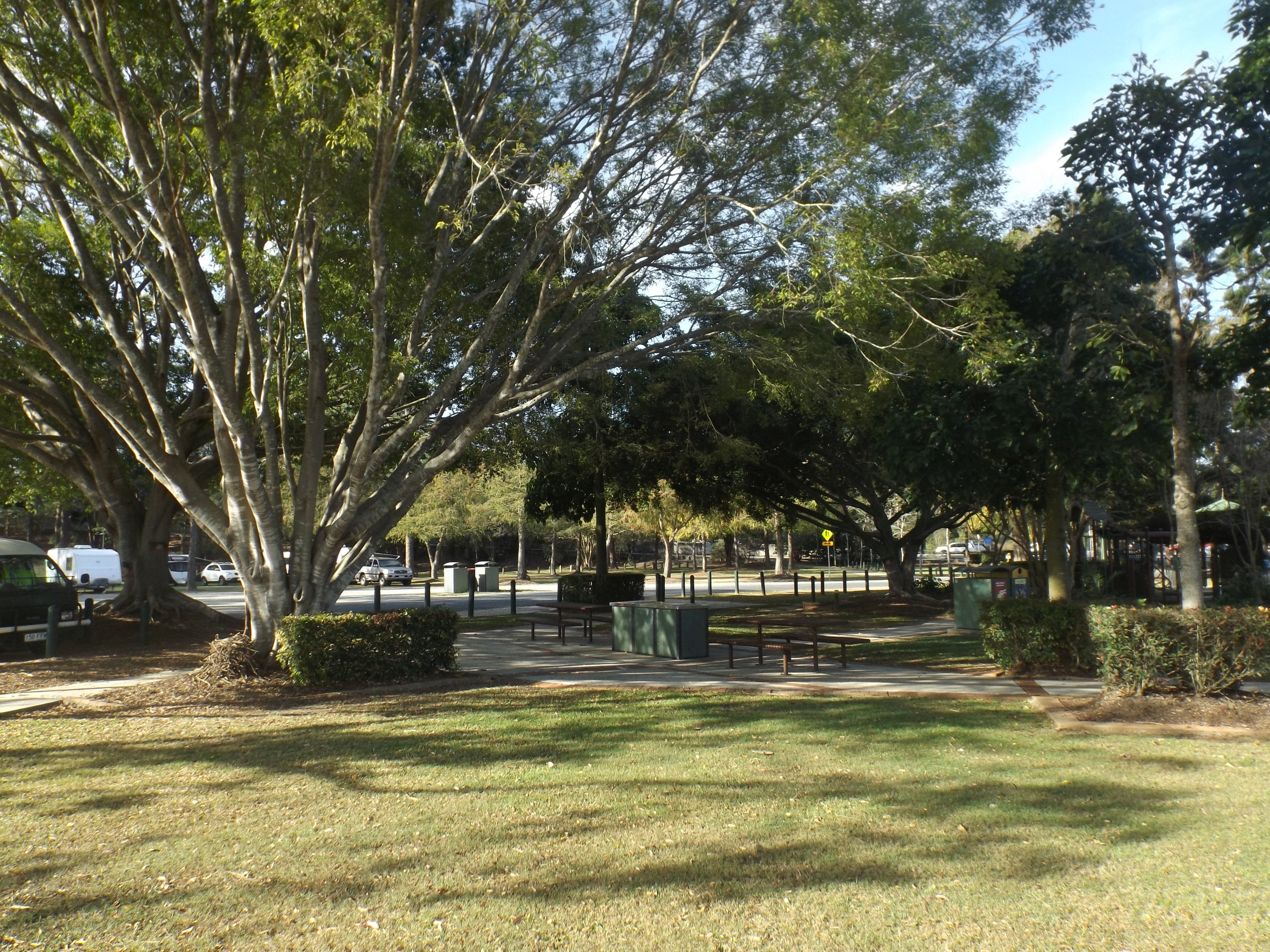
Facilities at Petrie Road Rest Area which is also known as Wyllie Park

=== Petrie ===
The Petrie Road Rest Area is a wooded park located in the outer Brisbane suburb of Petrie. It is a triangle of land bounded on the east by Gympie Road, the west by the North Coast railway line and the south by the North Pine River. Access is obtained from Gympie Road.

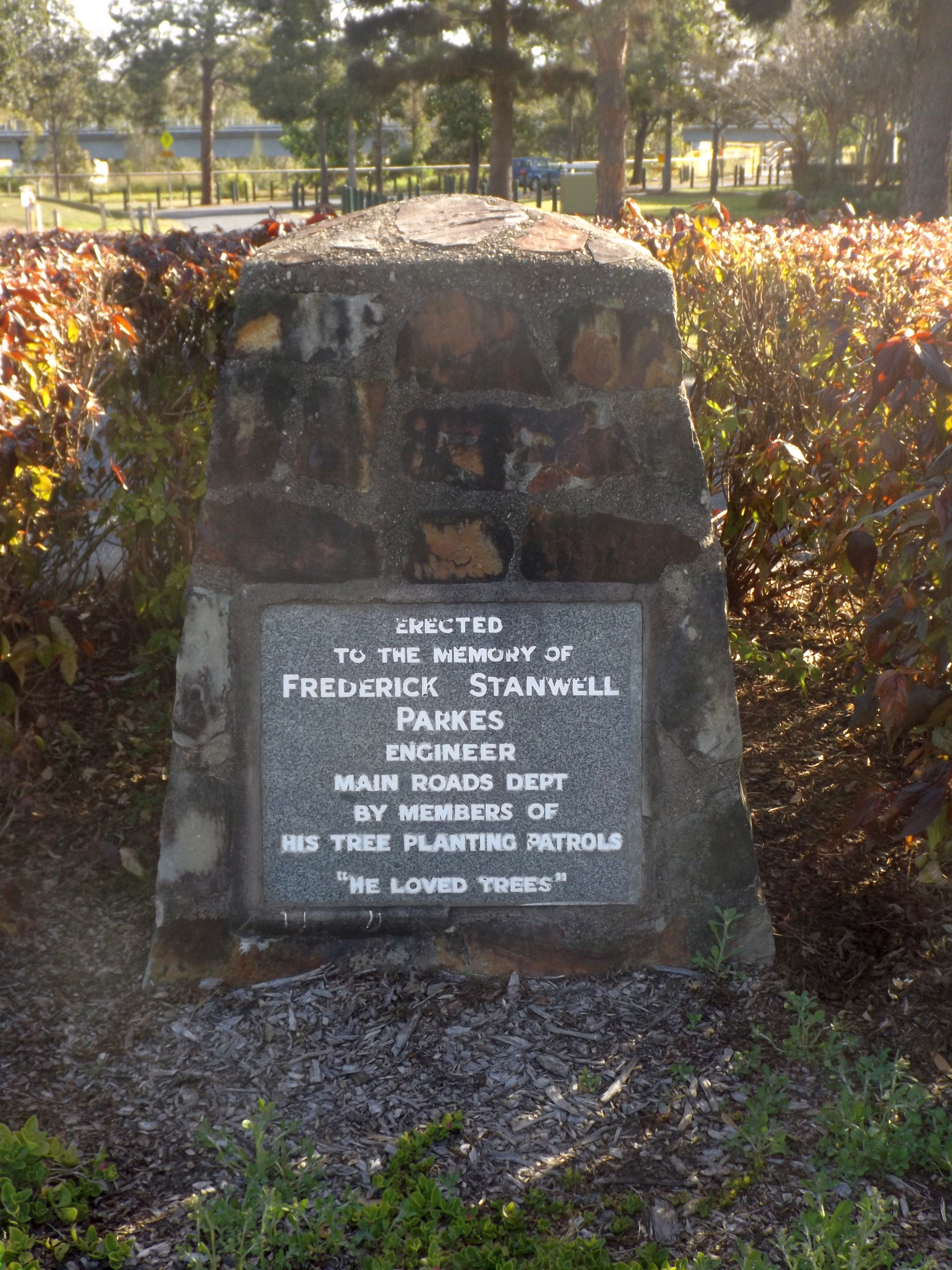
Memorial to Frederick Stanwell Parkes, Petrie Road Rest Area

The entrance is marked by two tall green wooden posts. A bitumen road bordered by wooden bollards runs in a small circuit through the park from the entrance. Just inside the entrance, a granite monument set amongst low shrubs commemorates Frederick Stanwell Parkes, an engineer with the Main Roads Department.

The access road loops around a formal garden which forms the setting for a shelter shed, barbeque and playground. A table and seats are located next to the electric barbeque towards the west of this area. Slightly east of this is the playground. The shelter shed, hexagonal in plan, is located towards the other end of the area.

The northern end of the park and an area west of the barbeque is set aside for campers and caravans. This area is grassed and shaded by mature trees. A cream coloured, masonry lavatory block is located west of the barbeque area.

The southern section of the park comprises a lightly wooded, grassy expanse. Picnic settings and another shelter shed, similar in design to the one at the centre of the park, are located here. Concrete paths run through this area. At one point the path crosses a shallow gully via a small wooden bridge.

=== Jowarra ===
To the northwest edge of Steve Irwin Way just south of the Caloundra Road Off Ramp of the Bruce Highway, Jowarra Road Rest Area sits to the edge of the Beerwah Forest Reserve. An access road runs parallel to Steve Irwin Way with turns into a bitumened carpark (accommodating approximately 50 vehicles) to the north end of the park and into the gravelled van bay area (accommodating 9 bays) to south. There are also parking spaces along the access road. A small sign at the entrance to the van area indicates that "this area is provided for the convenience of the travelling public, maximum stay 20 hours".

Distinguished by tall mature trees, the park provides a shady retreat for travellers off the busy highway. The grassed area between the carpark and the van area accommodates a picnic shelter, toilet block, concrete water tank, a scatter of concrete picnic tables and seats and the entrance to the Jowarra Walking Tracks.

The picnic shelter consists of concreted coursed rubble stone walls with projecting piers to each corner and the doorways. Standing on a concrete slab floor, the shelter is protected by a timber framed gable roof clad with corrugated metal sheeting. The timber fascia to the northwest carries the words "MRD Jowarra Park 1960". Recent steel framed timber topped picnic tables and seats stand within the shelter which has doorways to the long sides. Open windows with concrete sills sit between the piers. An information board (about the Great North Road) sheltered by a small barrel roof stands to the northeast of shelter.

The entrance to the walking tracks is flanked by two piers of concreted random rubble stone. An information board sheltered by a gable roof stands nearby.

=== Paynter's Creek ===
Paynter's Creek Road Rest Area is a narrow park well shaded by mature trees set below the west side of Nambour Connection Road approximately three kilometres south of Nambour. Bounded by Cobbs Road to the north, a private property to the west, Paynter Creek to the south and Nambour Connection Road to the east, the park is accessed from Cobbs Road.

A bitumened road edged with timber posts supporting timber cross boards forms a U-shape track through the park. Grassed areas to centre and verges of internal road accommodate timber picnic tables and seats - one set sheltered by a gabled roof. There is a discreet camping area to the northwest and a car parking area off the internal road to the west.

== Heritage listing ==
North Coast Roadside Rest Areas was listed on the Queensland Heritage Register on 5 February 2009 having satisfied the following criteria.

The place is important in demonstrating the evolution or pattern of Queensland's history.

The old Bruce Highway (and feeder road) Rest Areas (Petrie, Jowarra and Paynter's Creek) (1951–1960) are among the earliest known places of this type associated with a highway that was, at the time, Queensland's most important tourist road. As such, they demonstrate an important phase in the evolution of the State's road network and tourist industry. The early 1950s saw a major increase in medium to long-distance car travel and tourism. The road rest areas were developed to accommodate this trend by providing places at convenient locations where motorists could rest or camp.

The rest areas are also evidence of the early development of caravanning. When caravanning became popular from the early 1950s relatively few sites in Queensland offered the appropriate infrastructure and rest areas throughout the North Coast became important as short term caravanning sites.

The place is important in demonstrating the principal characteristics of a particular class of cultural places.

Petrie, Jowarra and Paynter's Creek road rest areas are fine examples of this place type. Designed to provide a place for travellers to stop to rest, eat and drink before continuing on their journey, they are located in road reserves and/or scenic spots, being easily accessible from a roadway, providing convenient parking for vehicles and accommodating picnic tables and barbeque facilities. Petrie and Jowarra also provide camping and van parking spaces and toilets.

The place is important because of its aesthetic significance.

Shady havens, these road rest areas are valued as restful spaces providing travellers with opportunities to relax and enjoy picnicking and other informal leisure activities in pleasant surroundings.
