= Mons, Queensland =

Mons
- Suburb
- Interactive map of Mons
- Coordinates: 26.69°S 153.0261°E
- Country: Australia
- State: Queensland
- City: Sunshine Coast
- LGA: Sunshine Coast Region
- Location: 3.5 km (2.2 mi) W of Buderim; 9.7 km (6.0 mi) NW of Sippy Downs; 12.4 km (7.7 mi) SW of Maroochydore; 95.5 km (59.3 mi) N of Brisbane

Government
  - State electorates: Buderim; Ninderry
  - Federal division: Fairfax

Area
  - Total: 4.2 km^{2} (1.6 sq mi)

Population
  - Total: 1,179 (2021 census)
  - Density: 281/km^{2} (727/sq mi)
- Time zone: UTC+10:00 (AEST)
- Postcode: 4556
- County: Canning
- Parish: Mooloolah
Suburbs around Mons
Forest Glen	Buderim	Buderim
Forest Glen	Mons	Buderim
Chevallum	Tanawha	Tanawha

Mons is a rural residential locality in the Sunshine Coast Region, Queensland, Australia. It is part of the Buderim urban centre. In the 2021 census, Mons had a population of 1,179 people.

== History ==
The name Mons commemorates a Battle of Mons that took place in 1914 during World War I in Belgium.

Buderim Road State School opened on 7 February 1916, but was soon renamed Mons State School. It closed in 1974.

The former Forest Glen Deer Sanctuary was on the Tanawha Tourist Drive (26.7016°S 153.0180°E). The site was redeveloped as a private mansion.

== Demographics ==
In the 2006 census, Mons had a population of 683 people.

In the 2016 census, Mons had a population of 946 people.

In the 2021 census, Mons had a population of 1,179 people.

== Education ==
There are no schools in Mons. The nearest government primary schools are Buderim Mountain State School in neighbouring Buderim to the east, Chevallum State School in neighbouring Chevallum to the south-west and Kuluin State School in Kuluin to the north-east. The nearest government secondary schools are Chancellor State College in Sippy Downs to the south-east and Maroochydore State High School in Maroochydore to the north-east.
