= Glenview, Queensland =

Glenview
- Suburb
- Interactive map of Glenview
- Coordinates: 26.7694°S 153.0169°E
- Country: Australia
- State: Queensland
- LGA: Sunshine Coast Region
- Location: 14.5 km (9.0 mi) WNW of Caloundra; 19.9 km (12.4 mi) SW of Maroochydore; 21.4 km (13.3 mi) S of Nambour; 86.4 km (53.7 mi) N of Brisbane

Government
  - State electorate: Caloundra
  - Federal division: Fisher

Area
  - Total: 18.7 km^{2} (7.2 sq mi)

Population
  - Total: 1,396 (2021 census)
  - Density: 74.65/km^{2} (193.3/sq mi)
- Time zone: UTC+10:00 (AEST)
- Postcode: 4553
Suburbs around Glenview
Ilkley	Tanawha	Palmview
Mooloolah Valley	Glenview	Meridan Plains
Landsborough	Landsborough	Corbould Park

Glenview is a rural locality in the Sunshine Coast Region, Queensland, Australia. In the 2021 census, Glenview had a population of 1,396 people.

== Geography ==
Part of the western boundary is marked by the Mooloolah River which flows eastwards across Glenview towards the coast. The Bruce Highway forms the eastern boundary, and the Steve Irwin Way (State Route 6) passes from south to east, where it intersects with and crosses the Bruce Highway to become Caloundra Road.

Glenview has the following mountains:

- Meridan Hill (26.7903°S 153.0341°E) 140 metres (460 ft)
- Mount Sippy (26.7478°S 153.0246°E) 180 metres (590 ft)

== History ==
Mooloolah Plains Provisional School opened in 1878. In November 1879 it became a half-time school in conjunction with Mooloolah Bridge Provisional School (meaning they shared a single teacher between the two schools). Mooloolah Plains Provisional School closed in late 1881 but reopened in 1883 once again in half-time conjunction with Mooloolah Bridge Provisional School. In July 1888 Mooloolah Plains Provisional School became a full time school. On 1 January 1909 it became Glenview State School.

== Demographics ==
In the 2016 census, Glenview had a population of 1,187 people.

In the 2021 census, Glenview had a population of 1,396 people.

== Heritage listings ==
Glenview has a number of heritage-listed sites, including:

- Steve Irwin Way: North Coast Roadside Rest Areas
- Steve Irwin Way: Mooloolah Cemetery

== Education ==
Glenview State School is a government primary (Prep-6) school for boys and girls at 6 Leeding Road (26.7656°S 153.0136°E). In 2018, the school had an enrolment of 225 students with 18 teachers (14 full-time equivalent) and 10 non-teaching staff (7 full-time equivalent).

There are no secondary schools in Glenview. The nearest government secondary schools are Chancellor State College in Sippy Downs to the north-west and Meridan State College in neighbouring Meridan Plains to the east.

== Facilities ==
The Mooloolah Cemetery is located on Steve Irwin Way in Glenview (26.7751°S 153.0377°E).
