= Chevallum, Queensland =

Chevallum
- Suburb
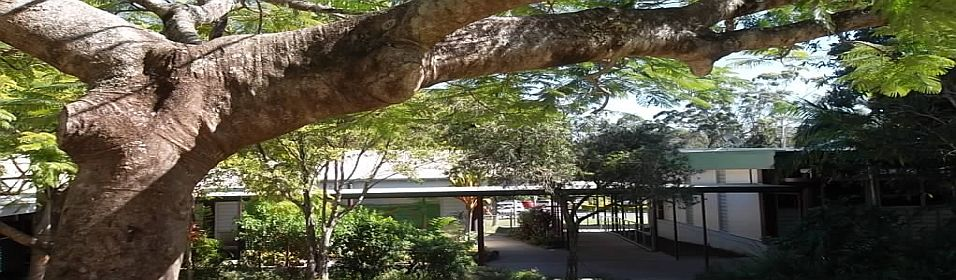
- Chevallum State School, 2013

- Interactive map of Chevallum
- Coordinates: 26.6983°S 152.9927°E
- Country: Australia
- State: Queensland
- LGA: Sunshine Coast Region
- Location: 10.6 km (6.6 mi) S of Nambour; 13.7 km (8.5 mi) WSW of Maroochydore; 23.8 km (14.8 mi) NW of Caloundra; 95.6 km (59.4 mi) N of Brisbane

Government
  - State electorate: Nicklin
  - Federal division: Fisher

Area
  - Total: 9.1 km^{2} (3.5 sq mi)

Population
  - Total: 467 (2021 census)
  - Density: 51.3/km^{2} (132.9/sq mi)
- Time zone: UTC+10:00 (AEST)
- Postcode: 4555
Suburbs around Chevallum
Palmwoods	Woombye	Forest Glen
Palmwoods	Chevallum	Mons; Tanawha
Eudlo	Ilkley	Ilkley

Chevallum is a rural locality in the Sunshine Coast Region, Queensland, Australia. In the 2021 census, Chevallum had a population of 467 people.

== Geography ==
Part of the western boundary of the suburb is marked by the Bruce Highway. Eudlo Creek, a tributary of the Maroochy River courses through the suburb.

== History ==
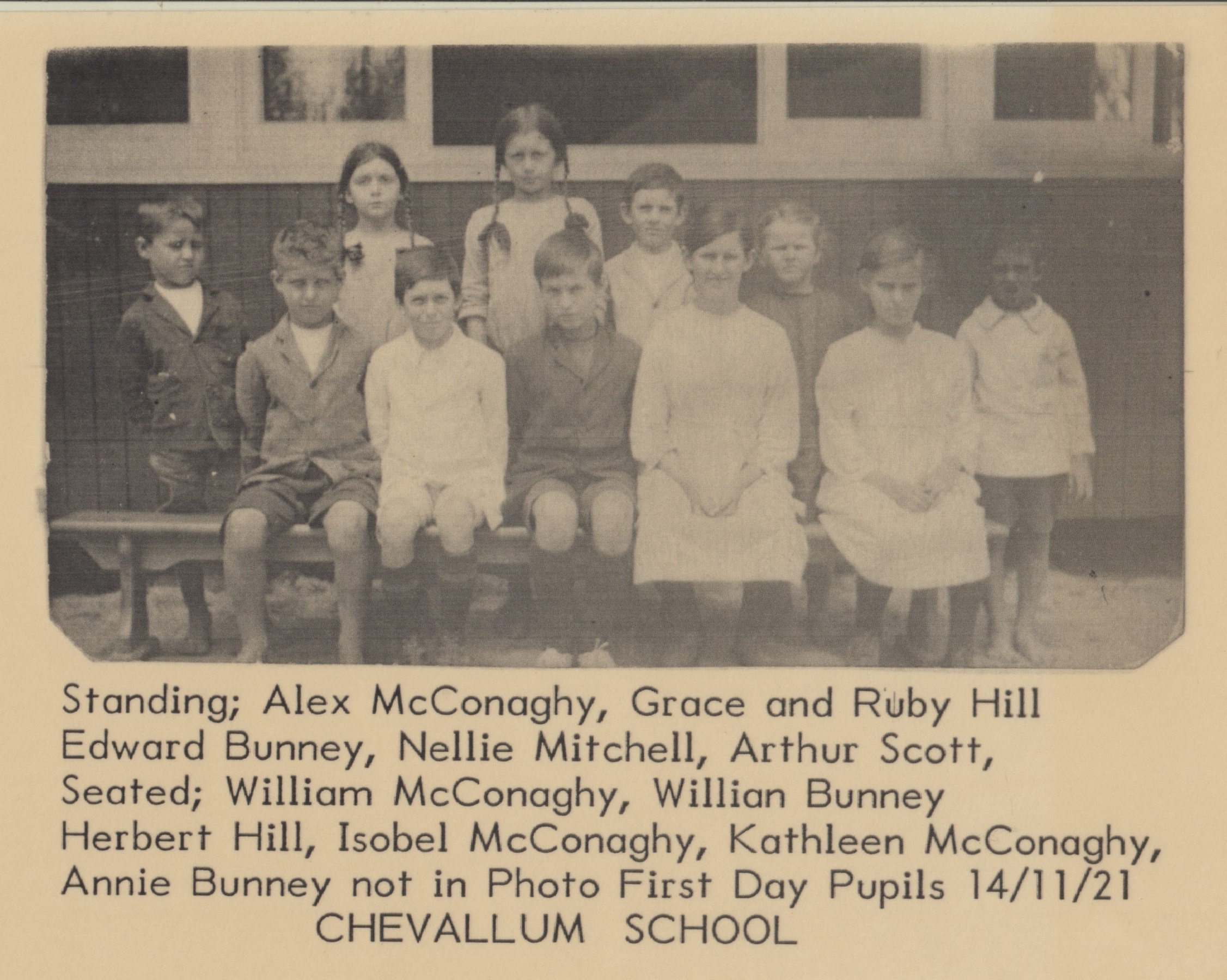
First day pupils, Chevallum State School, 14 November 1921

The name Chevallum is believed to be a corruption of local Aboriginal words "cha-balan" meaning "flat place".

Chevallum State School opened on 1 November 1921. In 1924 it became a half-time school sharing a teacher with Ilkey State School. Later in 1924, it resumed as a full-time school. The school was on the south-west corner of Chevallum Road and Chevallum School Road (26.6966°S 152.9894°E). In 1962, the school relocated to its present site. The former school building on Chevallum School Road is still extant and is operated by the Lions Club as the Chevallum Community Centre.

== Demographics ==
In the 2016 census, Chevallum had a population of 441 people.

In the 2021 census, Chevallum had a population of 467 people.

== Education ==
Chevallum State School is a government primary (Prep–6) school for boys and girls at 460 Chevallum Road (26.6984°S 152.9993°E). In 2017, the school had an enrolment of 478 students with 41 teachers (33 full-time equivalent) and 23 non-teaching staff (14 full-time equivalent). In 2018, the school had an enrolment of 468 students with 43 teachers (34 full-time equivalent) and 24 non-teaching staff (15 full-time equivalent). The school includes a special education program. The school also operates a kitchen garden, based on permaculture principles.

There are no secondary schools in Chevallum. The nearest government secondary schools are Nambour State College in Nambour to the north and Chancellor State College in Sippy Downs to the east.

== Economy ==
Chevallum is known for its strawberries and participates in the local Strawbfest. It has a local permaculture group devoted to organic and sustainable farming, which holds regular meetings at Chevallum State School.

Burnside has a median household weekly income of $2,020, ranking in the top 23% for income on the Sunshine Coast. The area has a low unemployment rate of 1.0%.
