= Ilkley, Queensland =

Ilkley
- Suburb
- Interactive map of Ilkley
- Coordinates: 26.7316°S 152.9927°E
- Country: Australia
- State: Queensland
- LGA: Sunshine Coast Region
- Location: 11.4 km (7.1 mi) SW of Buderim; 15.4 km (9.6 mi) S of Nambour; 22.0 km (13.7 mi) NW of Caloundra; 93.9 km (58.3 mi) N of Brisbane

Government
  - State electorate: Nicklin
  - Federal division: Fisher

Area
  - Total: 16.5 km^{2} (6.4 sq mi)

Population
  - Total: 812 (2021 census)
  - Density: 49.21/km^{2} (127.5/sq mi)
- Time zone: UTC+10:00 (AEST)
- Postcode: 4554
Suburbs around Ilkley
Palmwoods	Chevallum	Tanawha
Eudlo	Ilkley	Tanawha
Mooloolah Valley	Mooloolah Valley	Glenview

Ilkley is a rural locality in the Sunshine Coast Region, Queensland, Australia. In the 2021 census, Ilkley had a population of 812 people.

== Geography ==
Historically a fruit-growing district, the current land use is predominantly rural residential housing with some grazing and horticulture.

== History ==
Following the establishment of a settlement there about 1890, the locality was named Ilkley after Ilkey in Yorkshire, England, the home town of the local preacher Joseph Kitson.

On 16 May 1891, the 10-acre (4.0 ha) Portion 22 of the Parish of Mooloolah was reserved for a school. Tenders were called to erect the school in December 1900. Ilkley Provisional School opened on 25 November 1901 under head teacher Walter Jeremy. An official opening was held on 17 January 1902. It became Ilkley State School on 1 January 1909. In 1924, it briefly became a part-time school sharing a teacher with Chevallum State School. After that, Ilkley State School remained a full-time school until its final closure on 31 December 1964 due to low student attendance. It was at 525 Ilkley Road (26.71629°S 152.99710°E). The Coolum Branch of the Q.C.W.A. purchased the school building in December 1966 and relocated it to Coolum.

== Demographics ==
In the 2016 census, Ilkley had a population of 827 people.

In the 2021 census, Ilkley had a population of 812 people.

== Education ==
There are no schools in Ilkley. The nearest government primary schools are Eudlo State School in neighbouring Eudlo to the west, Chevallum State School in neighbouring Chevallum to the north, and Chancellor State College in Sippy Downs to the east. The nearest government secondary schools are Chancellor State College in Sippy Downs and Palmview State Secondary College (to Year 9 in 2024, to Year 12 by 2027) in Palmview to the east.
