= Forest Glen, Queensland =

Forest Glen
- Suburb
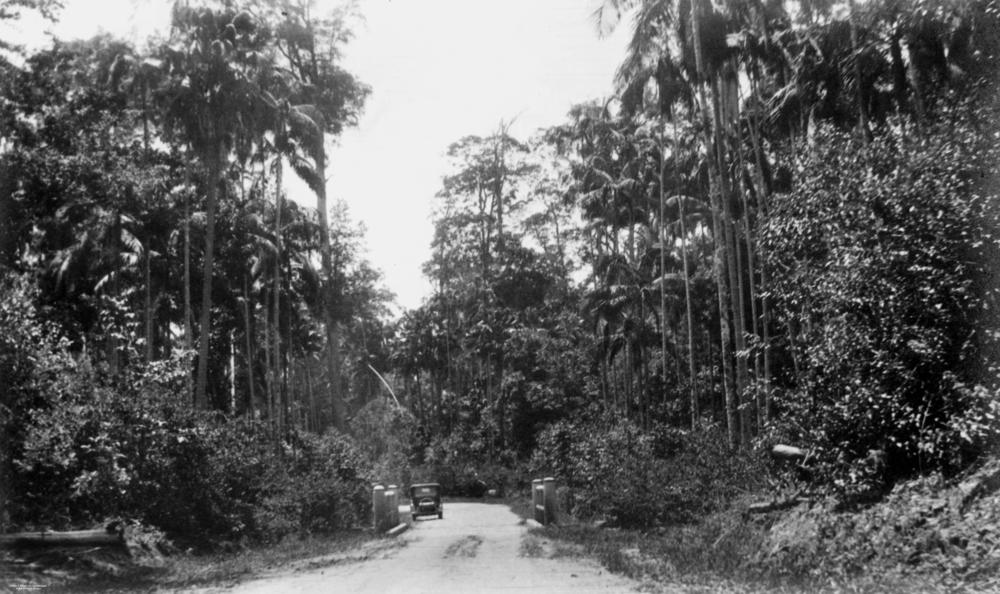
- Motor vehicle travelling along the North Coast Road, 1935

- Interactive map of Forest Glen
- Coordinates: 26.6733°S 153.0011°E
- Country: Australia
- State: Queensland
- City: Sunshine Coast
- LGA: Sunshine Coast Region
- Location: 6.3 km (3.9 mi) NW of Buderim; 7.7 km (4.8 mi) WSW of Maroochydore; 106 km (66 mi) N of Brisbane

Government
  - State electorates: Ninderry; Buderim
  - Federal division: Fairfax

Area
  - Total: 7.1 km^{2} (2.7 sq mi)

Population
  - Total: 1,657 (2021 census)
  - Density: 233.4/km^{2} (604/sq mi)
- Time zone: UTC+10:00 (AEST)
- Postcode: 4556
- County: Canning
- Parish: Mooloolah
Suburbs around Forest Glen
Kiels Mountain	Diddillibah	Kunda Park
Woombye	Forest Glen	Buderim
Chevallum	Tanawha	Mons

Forest Glen is a rural residential locality in the Sunshine Coast Region, Queensland, Australia. In the 2021 census, Forest Glen had a population of 1,657 people.

== Geography ==
Forest Glen is part of the Buderim urban area. The western boundary of Forest Glen follows the Bruce Highway.

Eudlo Creek, a tributary of the Maroochy River, is the main waterway in the area.

== History ==
Harmony Montessori School opened in Sippy Downs in 1995 with 13 children and one teacher. In 2007, the land being leased for the school was scheduled for development, and the school had to relocate. In 2015, the school purchased 22 hectares (54 acres) in Forest Glen and reopened the school as Montessori International College.

Sunshine Coast Grammar School opened in 1997. It is owned and operated by the Presbyterian and Methodist Schools Association (PMSA).

== Demographics ==
In the 2016 census, Forest Glen had a population of 1,390 people.

In the 2021 census, Forest Glen had a population of 1,657 people.

== Education ==
Montessori International College is a private primary and secondary (Prep-12) school for boys and girls at 880–932 Maroochydore Road (26.6711°S 153.0075°E). In 2017, the school had an enrolment of 235 students, with 24 teachers (20 full-time equivalent) and 21 non-teaching staff (16 full-time equivalent).

Sunshine Coast Grammar School is a private primary and secondary (Prep-12) school for boys and girls at 372 Mons Road (26.6861°S 153.0043°E). In 2017, the school had an enrolment of 1,241 students with 97 teachers (93 full-time equivalent) and 74 non-teaching staff (60 full-time equivalent).

There are no government schools in Forest Glen. The nearest government primary schools are Woombye State School in neighbouring Woombye to the west, Chevallum State School in neighbouring Chevallum to the south-west, and Kuluin State School in Kuluin to the north-east. The nearest government secondary schools are Maroochydore State High School in Maroochydore to the north-east and Chancellor State College in Sippy Downs to the south-east.

== Notable people ==
- Hugh Sawrey, an Australian artist and founder of the Australian Stockman's Hall of Fame, was born in Forest Glen.
