= Diamond Valley, Queensland =

Diamond Valley
- Suburb
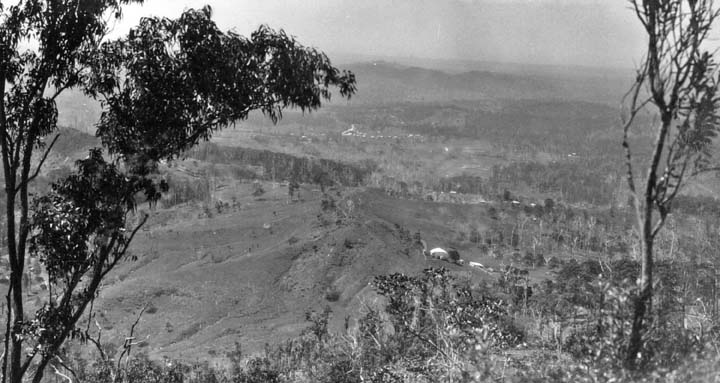
- Looking from Bald Knob across Diamond Valley towards Mooloolah, circa 1931

- Interactive map of Diamond Valley
- Coordinates: 26.7561°S 152.9263°E
- Country: Australia
- State: Queensland
- City: Sunshine Coast
- LGA: Sunshine Coast Region
- Location: 23.5 km (14.6 mi) WNW of Caloundra; 95.4 km (59.3 mi) N of Brisbane CBD

Government
  - State electorate: Glass House
  - Federal division: Fisher

Area
  - Total: 9.9 km^{2} (3.8 sq mi)

Population
  - Total: 489 (2021 census)
  - Density: 49.39/km^{2} (127.9/sq mi)
- Time zone: UTC+10:00 (AEST)
- Postcode: 4553
Suburbs around Diamond Valley
Eudlo	Eudlo	Eudlo
Balmoral Ridge	Diamond Valley	Mooloolah Valley
Bald Knob	Bald Knob	Mooloolah Valley

Diamond Valley is a rural locality in the Sunshine Coast Region, Queensland, Australia. In the 2021 census, Diamond Valley had a population of 489 people.

== History ==
Diamond Valley State School opened on 7 February 1927 and closed in 1936.

== Demographics ==
In the 2016 census, Diamond Valley had a population of 489 people.

In the 2021 census, Diamond Valley had a population of 489 people.

== Economy ==
There is a saw mill in Harris Road (26.7533°S 152.9269°E).

== Education ==
There are no schools in Diamond Valley. The nearest government primary school is Mooloolah State School in neighbouring Mooloolah Valley to the south-east. The nearest government secondary school is Maleny State High School in Maleny to the south-west.
