= Mooloolah Valley, Queensland =

Mooloolah Valley
- Suburb
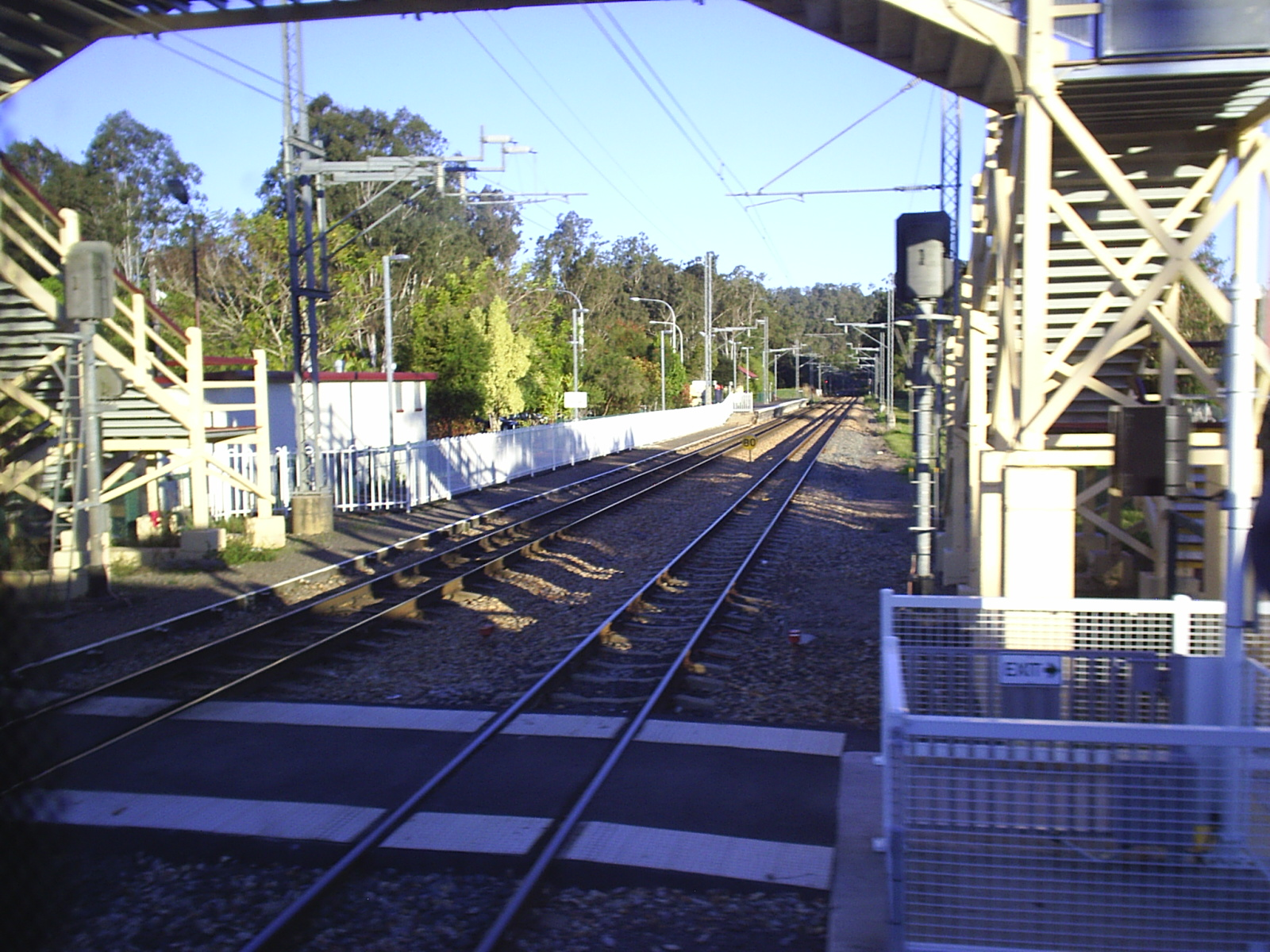
- Mooloolah railway station

- Interactive map of Mooloolah Valley
- Coordinates: 26.7625°S 152.9633°E
- Country: Australia
- State: Queensland
- LGA: Sunshine Coast Region
- Location: 17.9 km (11.1 mi) S of Nambour; 19.2 km (11.9 mi) NWN of Caloundra; 94.8 km (58.9 mi) N of Brisbane

Government
  - State electorates: Glass House; Nicklin
  - Federal division: Fisher

Area
  - Total: 18.3 km^{2} (7.1 sq mi)

Population
  - Total: 3,629 (2021 census)
  - Density: 198.3/km^{2} (513.6/sq mi)
- Time zone: UTC+10:00 (AEST)
- Postcode: 4553
Suburbs around Mooloolah Valley
| Eudlo | Eudlo | Ilkley |
| Diamond Valley | Mooloolah Valley | Glenview |
| Bald Knob | Landsborough | Landsborough |

Mooloolah Valley is a rural locality in the Sunshine Coast Region, Queensland, Australia. In the 2021 census, Mooloolah Valley had a population of 3,629 people.

Mooloolah is a town (26.7652°S 152.9613°E) within the locality.

== Geography ==
Mooloolah Valley is in the Sunshine Coast hinterland, north of Landsborough on the main railway line from Brisbane with regular services southbound to Brisbane and northbound to Nambour and Gympie from Mooloolah railway station (26.7661°S 152.9633°E).

The Mooloolah River forms part of the eastern boundary.

== History ==
The name Mooloolah comes from the Kabi language meaning either place of black snakes or place of snapper.

In early 1861 the tender of Edmund Lander was accepted, by the Commissioner for Crown Lands, for the pastoral run of Mooloolah Plains in the Wide Bay and Burnett District. A year later the lease was transferred to John Westaway.

Lander went on to select 80 acres (32 hectares) in 1869 on the main coach road between Brisbane and Gympie at the Mooloolah Bridge. On this property the Mooloolah Post Office was established in 1872.

The town of Mooloolah was surveyed in 1884 by J.E. Palisser. The locality was originally called Mooloolah but this was changed to Mooloolah Valley on 2 June 1995.

Mooloolah Provisional School opened on 6 February 1894 with an initial enrolment of 28 students under head teacher Agnes May Black. On 1 January 1909, it became Mooloolah State School.

St Thomas' Anglican Church was dedicated on 22 April 1927 by Archdeacon Glover.

Glasshouse Country Uniting Church opened its church at Beerwah on 16 December 2000. It was a result of the merger of the Glasshouse Uniting Church, Beerwah Uniting Church, Landsborough Uniting Church and Mooloolah Uniting Church.

== Demographics ==
In the 2016 census, Mooloolah Valley had a population of 3,321 people.

In the 2021 census, Mooloolah Valley had a population of 3,629 people.

== Heritage listings ==
Mooloolah has a number of heritage-listed sites, including:

- Dularcha Railway Tunnel, 1.5 kilometres (0.93 mi) south of Mooloolah township: 1.5 kilometres (0.93 mi) south of Mooloolah township
- Ewen Maddock House Site, Maddock Park, Mooloolah Connection Road

== Education ==
Mooloolah State School is a government primary (Prep-6) school for boys and girls at King Road (26.7690°S 152.9582°E). In 2017, the school had an enrollment of 191 students with 16 teachers (14 full-time equivalent) and 12 non-teaching staff (8 full-time equivalent).
