= Eudlo, Queensland =

Eudlo
- Town
- Interactive map of Eudlo
- Coordinates: 26.7261°S 152.9588°E
- Country: Australia
- State: Queensland
- City: Sunshine Coast
- LGA: Sunshine Coast Region
- Location: 12.8 km (8.0 mi) S of Nambour; 22.9 km (14.2 mi) NW of Caloundra; 94.8 km (58.9 mi) N of Brisbane

Government
  - State electorate: Buderim
  - Federal division: Fisher

Area
  - Total: 20.2 km^{2} (7.8 sq mi)

Population
  - Total: 1,192 (2021 census)
  - Density: 59.01/km^{2} (152.8/sq mi)
- Time zone: UTC+10:00 (AEST)
- Postcode: 4554
Localities around Eudlo
Landers Shoot	Palmwoods	Chevallum
Montville	Eudlo	Ilkley
Balmoral Ridge	Diamond Valley	Mooloolah Valley

Eudlo is a rural town and locality in the Sunshine Coast Region, Queensland, Australia. In the 2021 census, the locality of Eudlo had a population of 1,192 people.

== Geography ==
Eudlo Creek rises in the south west of Eudlo. Also in the areas is Mossy Bank Mountain, a summit along an easterly protruding spur of the Blackall Range.

Eudlo railway station is on the North Coast railway line (26.7258°S 152.9568°E).

== History ==
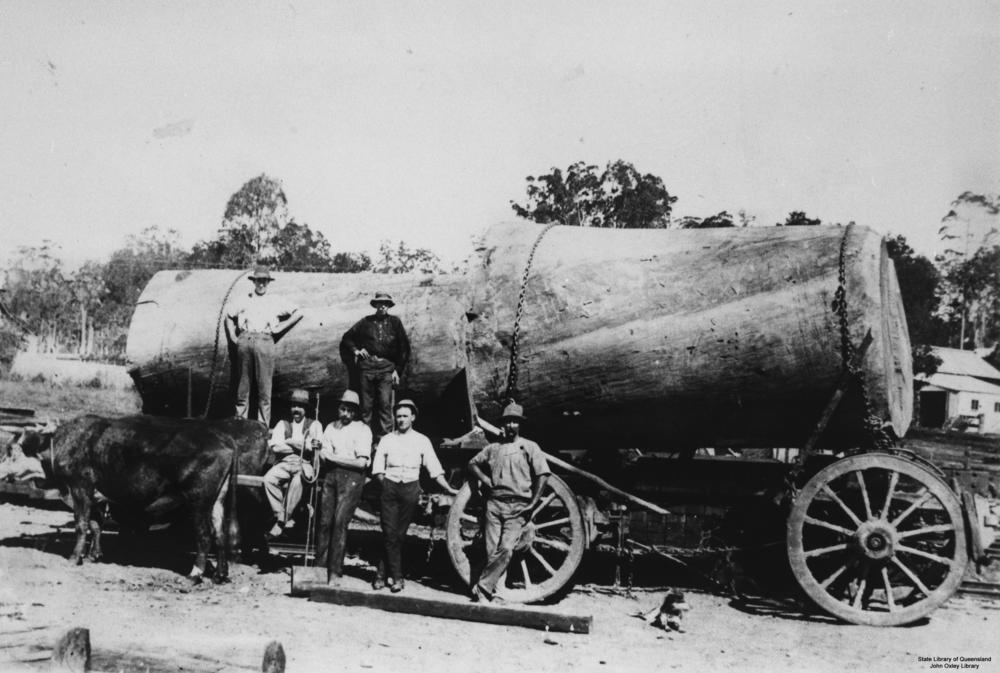
Logging in Eudlo, circa 1905

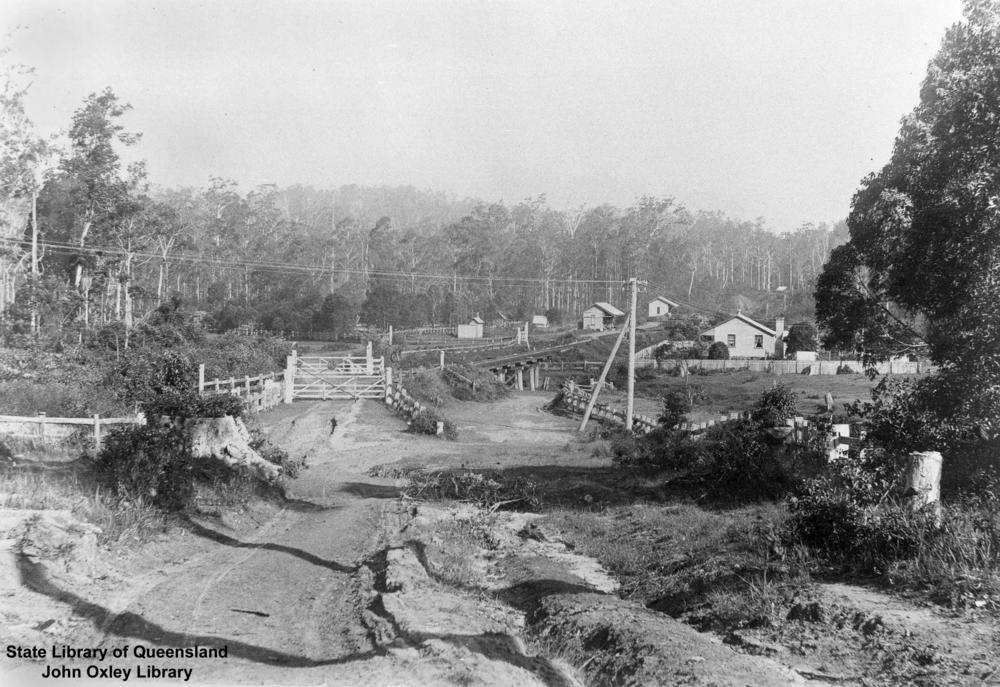
View over the Eudlo railway station, 1907

The name of Eudlo originated from the local Aboriginal term for the fresh water eel (Anguilla reinhardtii).

Cattlemen and timbergetters came to the area from the 1860s, but land was not made available for agricultural selection until the 1880s. The first selector was James Steele in 1887.

In 1891, the section of the North Coast railway line from Landsborough to Yandina was opened. It brought closer settlement to the whole district, and facilitated the transport of passengers, timber, fruit and produce.

Eudlo Post Office opened on 1 March 1891.

A sawmill was built at Eudlo and large quantities of timber from the Blackall Range, and surrounding forests, were either treated at the mill or railed to other centres. The timber industry was the means of livelihood for the early settlers.

Eudlo State School was opened on 6 September 1897.

Eudlo General Store is around a century old and has been used as a service station, antique store, grocery store, before being refurbished in 2021 as a bakery.

On Saturday 11 August 1951, a stump-capping ceremony was held for the Eudlo Methodist Church. The church was built in 1952 by local builder Stan Carlsen. The church was officially opened on Saturday 16 August 1952. It was at 20-22 Anzac Avenue (26.7261°S 152.9598°E). It has closed and been converted to a house.

In 1974, the Chenrezig Institute was opened and remains one of the largest Tibetan Buddhist retreat in the Western world.

== Demographics ==
In the 2011 census, the locality of Eudlo had a population of 1,128 people.

In the 2016 census, the locality of Eudlo had a population of 1,117 people.

In the 2021 census, the locality of Eudlo had a population of 1,192 people.

== Education ==
Eudlo State School is a government primary (Prep-6) school for boys and girls on the corner of Highlands Road and Rosebed Street (26.7264°S 152.9581°E). In 2017, the school had an enrolment of 58 students with 10 teachers (4 full-time equivalent) and 7 non-teaching staff (3 full-time equivalent). In 2018, the school had an enrolment of 69 students with 9 teachers (5 full-time equivalent) and 11 non-teaching staff (4 full-time equivalent).

There are no secondary schools in Eudlo. The nearest government secondary schools are Nambour State College in Nambour to the north and Maleny State High School in Maleny to the south-west.

== Amenities ==
The Sunshine Coast Regional Council operates a mobile library service which visits the Community Hall at Rosebed Street.
