= Buderim Mountain State School =

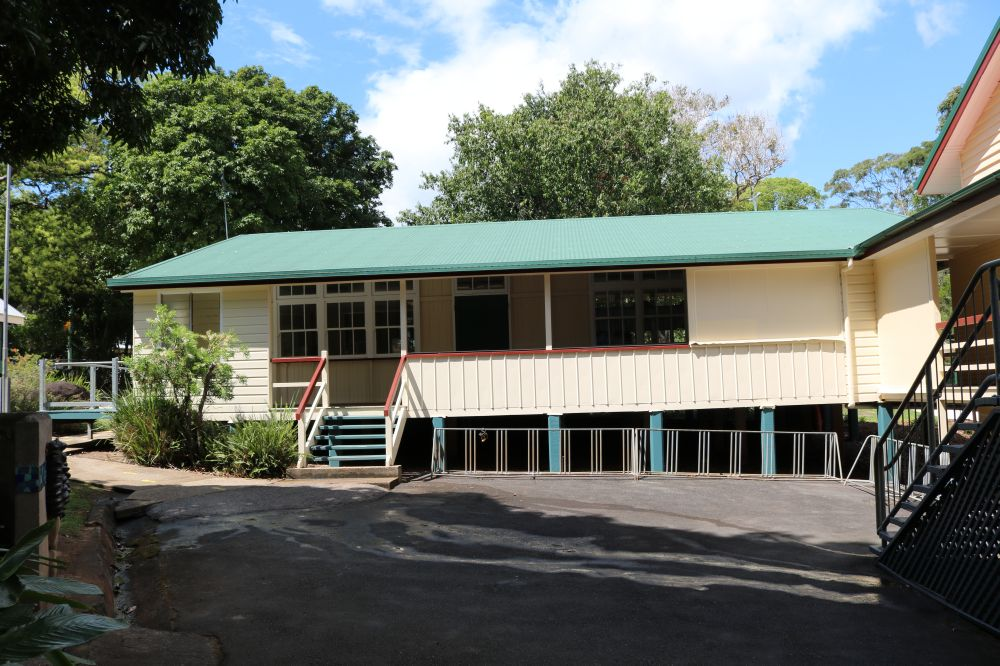
- Block B, built 1951–1954, in 2019

- Location within Queensland
- 26.6845°S 153.0523°E
- Location: 8–42 Main Street, Buderim, Sunshine Coast Region, Queensland, Australia

History
- Design period: 1919–1930s (Interwar period)
- Built: 1936–1948, 1948, c.1951–1954, 1953, 1959

Site notes
- Architect: Department of Public Works (Queensland)

Queensland Heritage Register
- Official name: Buderim Mountain State School; Buderim Mountain Provisional School
- Type: state heritage
- Designated: 3 May 2019
- Reference no.: 650089
- Type: Education, research, scientific facility: School-state; Monuments and Memorials: Memorial/Monument – war
- Theme: Creating social and cultural institutions: Commemorating significant events; Educating Queenslanders: Providing primary schooling

Buderim Mountain State School is a heritage-listed state school and war memorial at 8–42 Main Street, Buderim, Sunshine Coast Region, Queensland, Australia. It was designed by Department of Public Works (Queensland) and built from 1936 to 1948. It was also known as Buderim Mountain Provisional School. It was added to the Queensland Heritage Register on 3 May 2019.

== History ==
Buderim Mountain State School was established in 1875 as Buderim Mountain Provisional School on a nearby site before moving to its present 6.06-hectare (15.0-acre) site in 1887 in the centre of town. The school retains two 1950s teaching buildings that were standard designs notable for their abundant provision of natural light and ventilation - Block B (1951, extended in 1954) and Block C (1959). An important feature of the school is its mature trees, including its extensive pine forestry plot and arboretum planted in trenches that were dug during WWII, as a war memorial in the late 1940s. The arboretum, sports grounds, and memorial gates are components of a broader "War Memorial Community Centre", established in 1945 by the Buderim community as a "living memorial". The school has been in continuous operation since its establishment and has been a focus for the local community as a place for important social and cultural activities.

The traditional owners of the Maroochy District, within which Buderim is located, were the Gubbi Gubbi language group, including the Nalbo, Kabi Kabi, Dallambara, and Undanbi. The mild sub-tropical climate and rich volcanic soil of the region supported abundant vegetation and food. Europeans first explored the Maroochy District in the 1820s. The native forests became a steady source of income for settlers during the 1870s and 1880s, but Maroochy settlers needed to be versatile to ensure their selections remained economically viable. By the mid-1870s, sugar cane was grown extensively in the area, with planters utilising South Sea Islander labour. Buderim Mountain sugar planters John Fielding and his son-in-law Joseph Chapman Dixon, established the mountain's first sugar mill in October 1876. Other crops grown in the area were bananas, citrus, pineapples and ginger. Queensland's coastal areas north of Brisbane, and the hinterland, developed rapidly in the 1880s. Buderim, a settlement which developed to service the local farmers, was established by the late 1880s.

Buderim Mountain Provisional School, the first school in Buderim, opened in 1875 on a site several kilometres east of the current school site, and was attended by students from all over the district. Attendance at the school grew and by 1887 a new school was constructed on the current site closer to the town's centre and renamed Buderim Mountain State School. The building became inadequate and in October 1916 a new school building (Block A) was officially opened.

In 1911 Reginald George Bartlett was appointed head teacher at Buderim Mountain State School. With an interest in agriculture, Bartlett began a program of experimental planting at the school to teach the children farming techniques with a focus on finding suitable crops for the district. In 1913, this work was commended by the Under Secretary of Education, JD Story, who highlighted the school's focus on fruit cultivation.

Despite the importance of the rural sector in the Queensland economy, rural education and training was slow to develop. In 1850 the first president of the Brisbane School of Arts, William Augustine Duncan, urged that an industrial school be established to instruct boys in the "theory and practice of agriculture and horticulture" but no action was taken until the 1890s. In 1897 the Queensland Agricultural College was established at Lawes near Gatton. It provided training for young men in the arts of agriculture and related sciences. The college was under the control of the Department of Agriculture and Stock and was part of a wider scheme of introducing "scientific agriculture" to the colony that also included experimental farms and travelling model dairies.

Within the school system, a limited form of rural instruction was introduced in syllabus changes made in 1905 and 1915. The principal avenue of instruction in primary schools was via project club activities such as livestock raising (pigs, calves, and poultry), bee keeping, milk testing, and forestry. In 1917 a rural school was established as an adjunct to the Nambour State School. The success of this venture prompted the expansion of rural schools and courses in Queensland.

As part of the Nambour scheme, four schools (termed 'linked schools') in the immediate district contributed to the rural school project - Buderim Mountain, Mapleton, Woombye, and Yandina. All these schools had head teachers with an interest in agriculture. In March 1917 all five head teachers met at Nambour State School prior to implementing the project, "the main idea underlying the establishment of the rural school system was to give a practical trend towards scientific agriculture, and so prepare a training ground, as it were, for the Agricultural College at Gatton". It was agreed that each school would cultivate certain crops thought to be suitable for that particular area. Buderim Mountain was initially allocated the cultivation and observation of bananas, thought to suit the mountain's conditions. The other schools would concentrate on growing crops such as pineapples and citrus fruit. As part of the linking of the schools, an excursion was to be held each month of the school year, to visit one of the participating schools. This would provide the opportunity for the children to see the progress of the other schools as well as for them to gain a wider knowledge of agricultural methods. The first of these excursions was to Buderim Mountain State School in May 1917. It was attended by 130 visiting pupils from the other four schools as well as a large contingent of parents and supportive community members.

Bartlett left Buderim Mountain State School in 1920 to work as an Assistant Instructor of Banana Culture in northern New South Wales. Buderim Mountain State School ceased to be involved in the rural school scheme and by August 1920, the entire linked school scheme had been abolished by the Department. The overall rural school system continued, however, with 29 rural schools established throughout Queensland by 1939.

Although the Buderim school was no longer an official "rural school", it continued to place some emphasis on agricultural education. From the 1920s, a project club existed. Crops such as strawberries and cabbages were planted and the children received "instruction on cultural methods, control of pests and diseases, and soil physics". In 1932, at the request of Raymond Lismore Prest, Instructor in Fruit Culture, an experimental plot of six different varieties of Macadamia trees was planted in the grounds. The children were to care for the trees and monitor their progress to find the most suitable variety for the district.

In 1936, tenders were called for the construction of a teachers residence for Buderim Mountain State School. This replaced an earlier 1886 timber residence.

An important development for Buderim was the construction of the Palmwoods to Buderim tramway which began operations in 1914. It enabled Buderim growers an efficient means of transporting their produce to market and subsequently provided the impetus for substantial settlement expansion and economic growth in the Buderim area. The tramway also provided public transport for locals and visitors alike. The tram terminus and associated buildings and infrastructure had been built on the school reserve on the corner of Main Street and Lindsay Road. Unfortunately, with the impact of the Great Depression, the tramway increasingly proved unprofitable and was closed in 1935.

By 1919 an Anzac Memorial Park Committee had been established in Buderim, which approached the Department of Public Instruction to obtain 2.5 acres (1.0 ha) of the school grounds to establish a public Anzac memorial park and sports ground. This request was granted under the proviso that the land remained government-owned. The committee planned to plant memorial trees to its fallen soldiers of World War I (WWI) adjacent to the proposed sports grounds as a memorial.

However, ground works did not begin until the 1930s. In 1936 working bees were held which "have effected a clearance of the rubbish and undergrowth in the lower part of the school ground where it is intended to make a sports oval". At the same time, the former tramway lines and associated buildings adjacent to the sports ground were removed and the land allocated for future sport facilities. Although only part of the grounds were improved at this time, it was enough to enable sports such as football, cricket, and tennis to be played.

At the end of World War II (WWII), several prominent Buderim Mountain community members took further steps to establish a fitting war memorial for the town. In late 1945, the Buderim War Memorial Community Centre (BWMCC) was established. The philosophy behind the movement was to create a "living war memorial" to honour the men and women from the district who had served in both WWI and WWII. It was to be a decided move away from the standard monumental war memorials which were erected throughout Australia following WWI, as the president of the committee, William Charles Chadwick stated: "those of us who have lived through the aftermath of WWI know only too well the thousands of pounds that were spent on memorials of cold stone which never have or will be of any direct benefit to the ex-serviceman". The objectives were clear: "To assist in the rehabilitation of returned men and women by drawing them actively into the social life of the community; to educate both adults and children in the ideals of community living and common citizenship; to provide by goodwill and example a pattern of living they hope to see spreading not only through the State, but through the nation and onwards to other countries". Their motto was "Service to Commemorate Sacrifice".

Following the devastation caused by WWII there was a strong ideological shift toward establishing living memorials to commemorate those who died in the war. This was not exclusive to Australia; Britain, the United States of America, and Canada supported the creating of living memorials. The Buderim Mountain community embraced the idea of a living memorial. In practice, it was proposed that support services, amenities, sporting facilities, and entertainment venues be established on the mountain for the use of ex-service men and women, and the whole community. By October 1946, the committee had achieved a series of improvements in Buderim: a Maternal and Child Welfare Clinic; a mountain bus service for pensioners and invalid servicemen; a community hall with billiard and reading room; picture shows; sporting clubs including tennis, croquet, cricket and football; and a theatrical group. By mid-1948 the committee had added a concrete cricket pitch to the sports ground, and built two community tennis courts (replacing the 1930s court) and a shelter shed at the western side of the oval. The location of the two side-by-side tennis courts at the western side of the oval can be seen in aerial photography. In 1952 a croquet lawn was built beside the original tennis courts. An important component of Queensland state schools was their grounds.

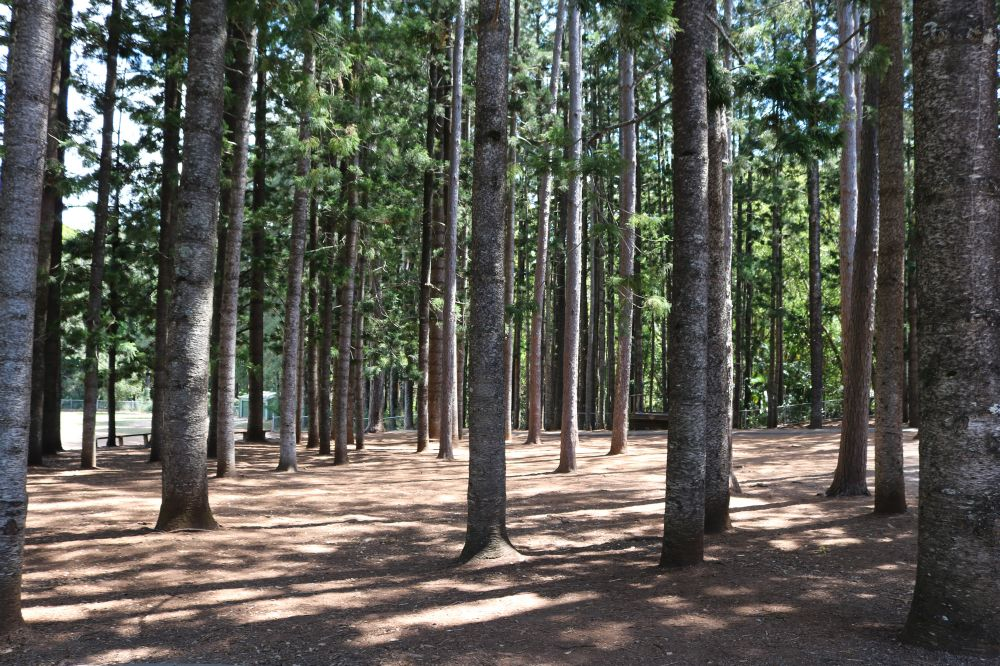
Arboretum, 2019

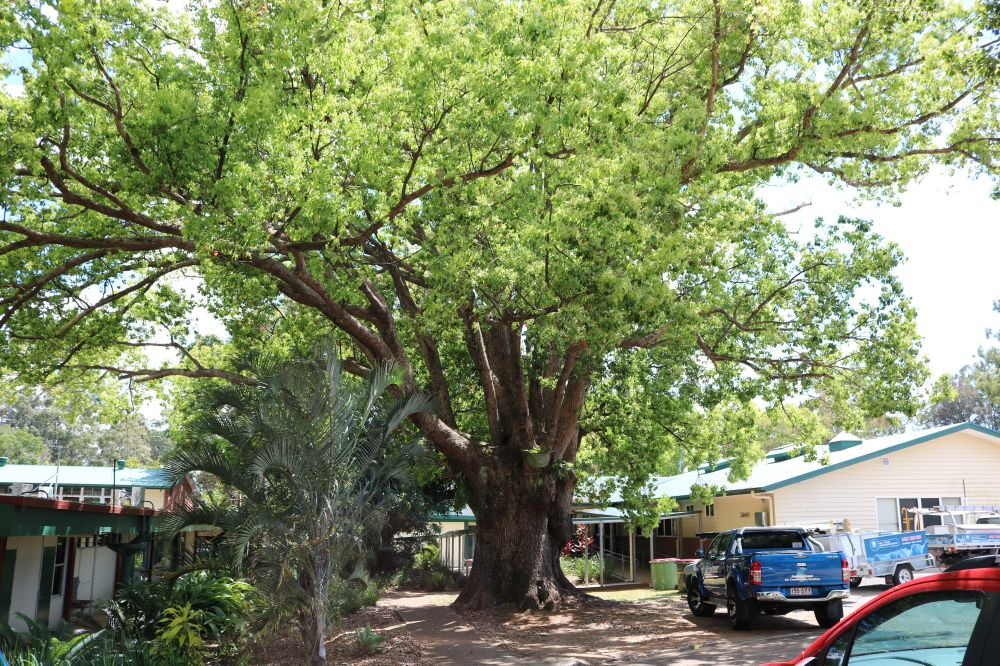
Mature camphor laurel, 2019

The early and continuing commitment to play-based education, particularly in primary school, resulted in the provision of outdoor play space and sports facilities, such as ovals and tennis courts. Also, trees and gardens were planted to shade and beautify schools and schools celebrated Arbor Day from 1890. Aesthetically-designed gardens were encouraged by regional inspectors, and educators believed gardening and Arbor Days instilled in young minds the value of hard work and activity, improved classroom discipline, developed aesthetic tastes, and inspired people to stay on the land. Arbor Day had been an important event at Buderim Mountain State School. Many of the mature trees within the grounds were planted as Arbor Day trees, including numerous camphor laurels (Cinnamomum camphora). On Arbor Day, 1945, 100 Pinus taeda trees, commonly known as loblolly pines, were planted in the school's forestry plot. Forestry plots were the product of after-school agricultural clubs, introduced in 1923 at primary schools, under the "home project" scheme. Curriculum driven, these clubs had a secondary commercial value as well as disseminating information and helping to develop a range of skills. The Department of Primary Industries provided suitable plants and offered horticultural advice. School forestry plots were seen by the government as a way of educating the next generation about the economic and environmental importance of trees, as well as providing testing grounds for new species. Located throughout the state, Arboretum plots were a means of experimenting with a variety of tree species in different soil and climatic conditions. Encouraged by the Education and Forestry Departments, by 1953 about 380 Queensland schools were undertaking forestry projects.

In addition to the ongoing improvements being undertaken throughout the Buderim district by the BWMCC, in July 1946 a proposal for the establishment of an "arboretum" was adopted. It was hoped that "the laying of an arboretum planted with suitable trees ... will add beauty to an already fine natural setting". In December of that year this came to fruition, with the planting of a further 600 trees, comprising 10 species, in the reserve beside the sports ground and the recently planted pine forestry plot at the school. The Buderim War Memorial Arboretum was planted by a large number of community members, including 50 children from the school, and would "serve to perpetuate the memory of those who served in the last two wars". The pine forest was included as part of the war memorial.

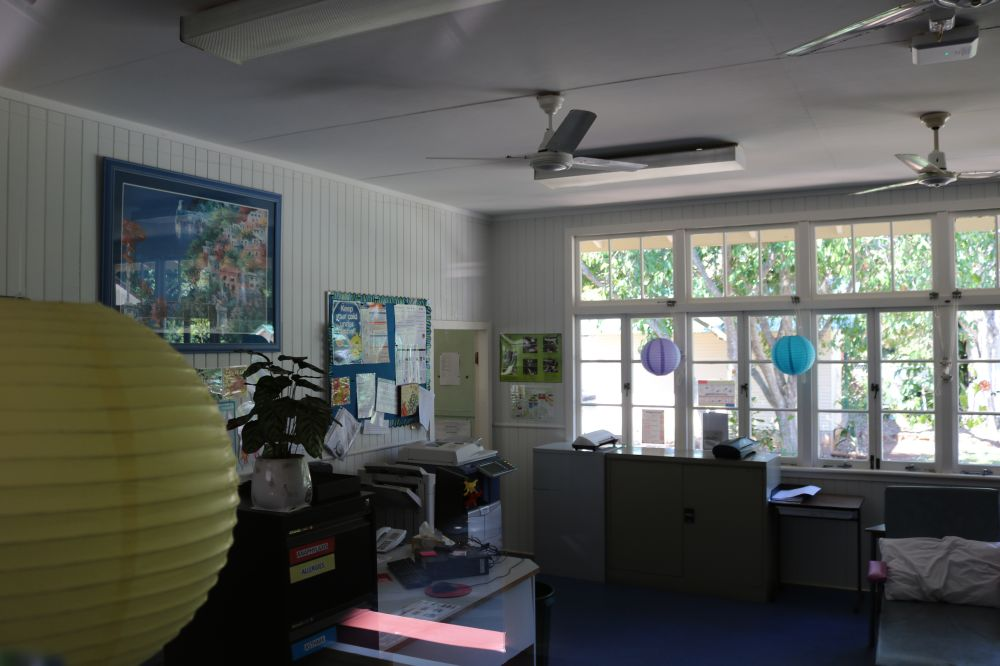
Block B classroom, 2019

Enrolments at Buderim Mountain State School grew in the postwar era and new classroom accommodation became necessary. In 1951 Block B was constructed. This was a lowset, timber-framed and -clad building with a gable roof and a north-facing verandah. It was a "temporary" building, built to a standard type (E/T5), and accommodated only one classroom. The building had abundant natural light and ventilation through banks of timber-framed casement and double-hung windows and fanlights. In 1954 Block B was extended with a second classroom on its eastern end, matching the earlier section in form and detail. A set of French doors was inserted in the partition between rooms and a small hatroom enclosure was on the east end of the verandah.

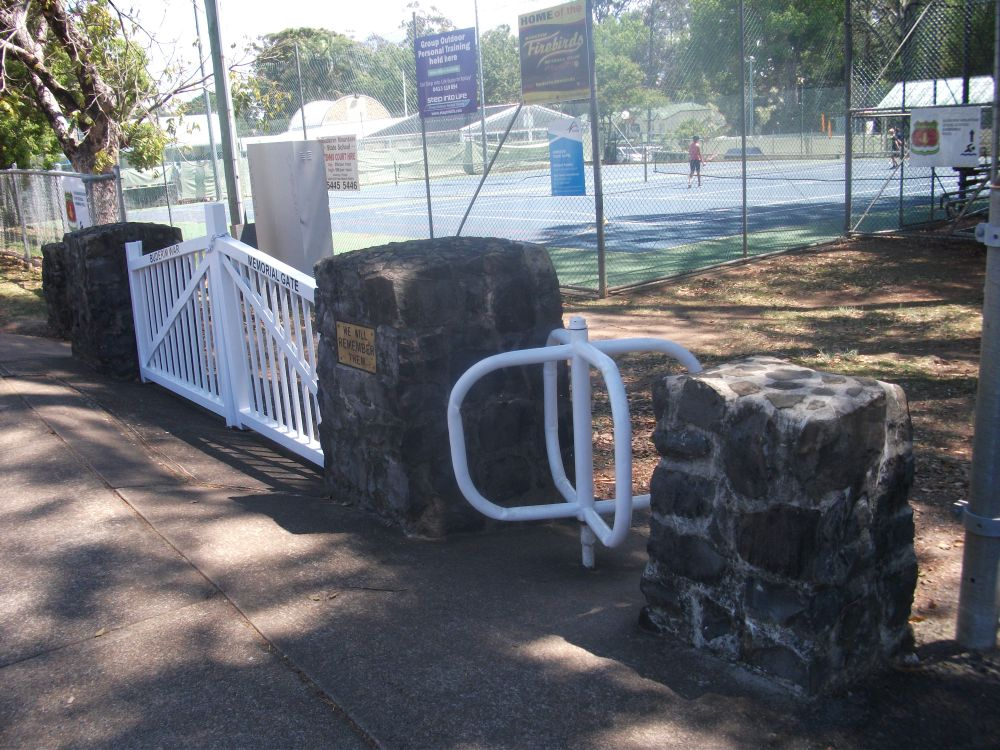
War memorial gates, 2019

In July 1953 memorial gates were added to the entry of the memorial sports ground on Main Street. The gates formalised the entrance and consisted of four low bluestone pillars with decorative timber gates, turnstile, and a plaque with the inscription "We Will Remember Them". The official unveiling was held on 3 July 1953 with visiting dignitary, Hon. Josiah Francis, Minister for the Army, opening the gates. All materials for the memorial gates were donated by locals.

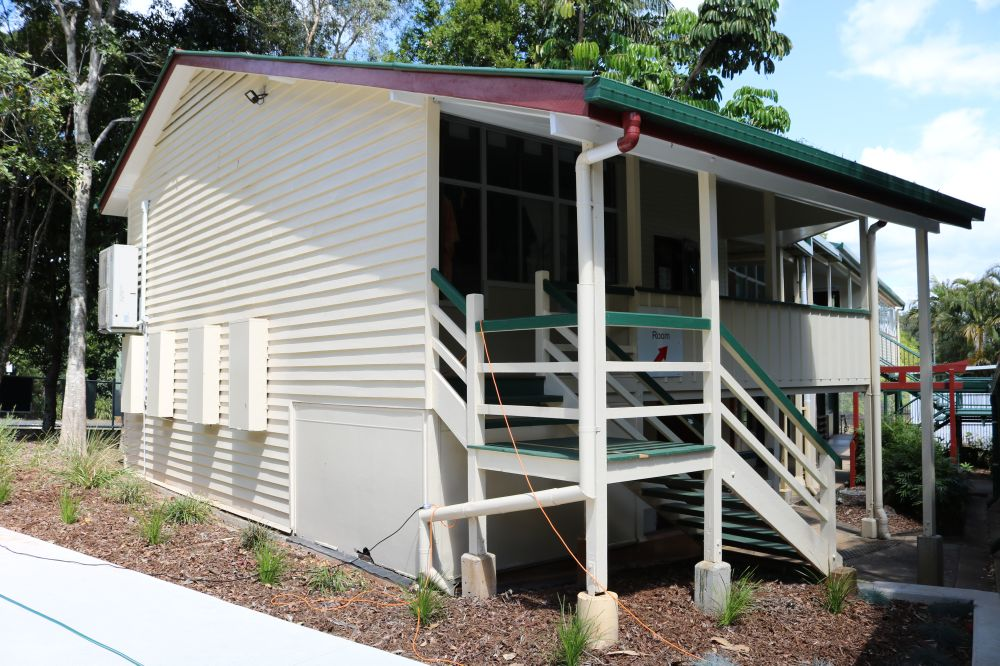
Block C, built 1959, in 2019

In 1959 another classroom building, Block C, was constructed. Highset on concrete posts, it was a timber-framed and weatherboard-clad building with an 8-foot (2.4 m) wide verandah on the north side used as circulation to a single, south-facing classroom 21 by 24 feet (6.4 m × 7.3 m). The earlier buildings on the site had been built parallel to the site boundaries but Block C disregarded this and was built at an angle to face directly north, which was characteristic of the standard type. Designed by the Department of Public Works, the type (High Set Timber Building with Semi-enclosed Stair, F/T4) was introduced in c. 1950 and built into the 1960s. (Despite its name, the type did not always include a semi-enclosed stair.) This type was typically long buildings of multiple classrooms and it was planned for Block C to be extended on its eastern end with further classrooms but this did not occur. Block C included typical variations of features introduced into later versions of the type - a bag-rack balustrade on the verandah and louvres in the verandah wall. In c. 1966 the original stair on the west side of Block C was removed and refixed on the northern side in a reconfigured L-shape with generous awning roof. In c. 1976 it was remodelled for administration use with partitions built to accommodate smaller offices. This work was reversed in c. 1986 with the partitions removed and the space reverting to a single classroom. The understorey had a concrete floor and was used as semi-enclosed covered space with a perimeter bench seat. The southern and verandah walls were extensively glazed, providing abundant natural light and ventilation to the classroom.

In 1957 a tennis court was constructed near the school, on the eastern side of the sports ground. In the 1960s another tennis court had been built adjacent to the original two. Between 1990 and 1993 the original two tennis courts were demolished, leaving only the later courts. A public swimming pool replaced the demolished courts, while the remaining court was refurbished and another added beside it. Between 1997 and 1999 the croquet lawn was demolished to make room for a large road roundabout. In 2016 the teachers residence was removed; the residence was a standard DPW Type 3.

Block A (1916) has had considerable changes made to it, losing its heritage significance. From the 1970s, other buildings were constructed at the school which are not of heritage significance and include Block D (1972), toilet block and covered play area (1973), Block G (1975), Pre-school centre (1977), Block E (1982), tuckshop (1987), administration block (1990), amenities block (1993), several modular buildings.

In 2019 the BWMCC continues its important community work in the spirit in which it was founded. Known today as the Buderim War Memorial Community Association, its headquarters are located in the former post office on Burnett Street. The memorial gates, sports ground, arboretum, and pine forest play important roles in Buderim's annual Anzac Day commemorations, with the march travelling through the gates to the pine forest, where the service is held in the cool shade of the trees. This demonstrates the strong degree of community association that continues in 2019.

Buderim Mountain State School has played an important role in the Buderim Mountain and district community since 1875 and continues to do so. Generations of students have been taught there and many social events held in the school's grounds and buildings since its establishment. The school continues to be a centre for social, sporting and community events.

== Description ==
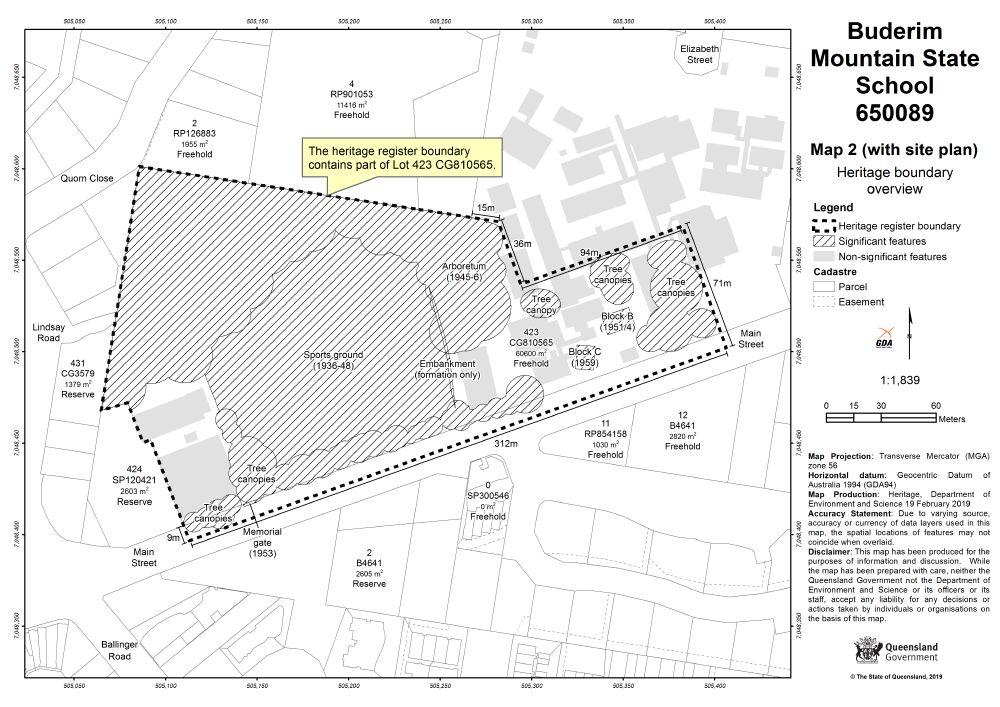
Site map, 2019

Buderim Mountain State School stands on a 6.06-hectare (15.0-acre) site in the centre of Buderim, a town stretching along the ridge of Buderim Mountain, Sunshine Coast. The town landscape is hilly and treed and concentrated along Main Street, the principal thoroughfare. The school site fronts Main Street one block east of the main retail area. It comprises a complex of school buildings at the western end and a large sports oval at the eastern end with an extensive forest of mature trees between.

=== Block B (Temporary Classroom Building, 1951 extended 1954) ===
Block B stands in the complex of school buildings and is an intact, small, lowset timber-framed and -clad, two-classroom building with a gable roof. It is oriented with its long sides facing northwest and southeast and has a northwest-facing verandah providing access to southeast-facing classrooms. Its two phases of construction are expressed in subtle but legible ways.

=== Block C (High Set Timber School Building, 1959) ===
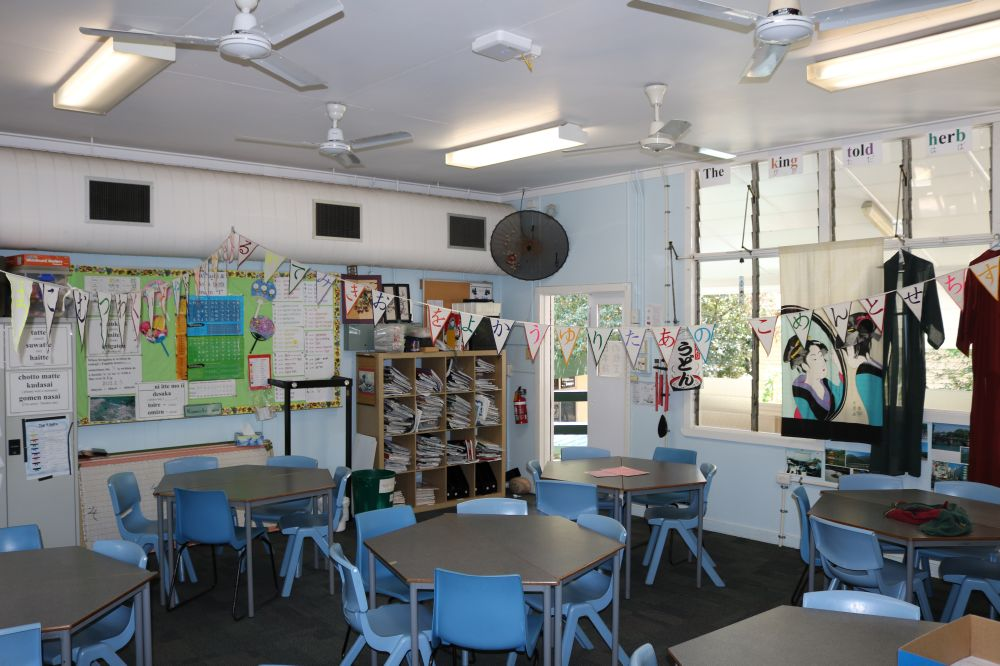
Block C classroom, 2019

Block C stands in the complex of school buildings and is an intact, small, highset, timber-framed and -clad, one-classroom building with a gable roof. It is oriented at an angle to the other school buildings in order for it to orient north. It has a verandah on the northern side accessing the south-facing classroom.

=== Memorial Gate (1953) ===
A war memorial gate stands on the school boundary at the western end of the grounds, providing access into the sports ground from Main Street.

=== Memorial Sports Ground (1936–1948) with embankment (1936–1948) ===
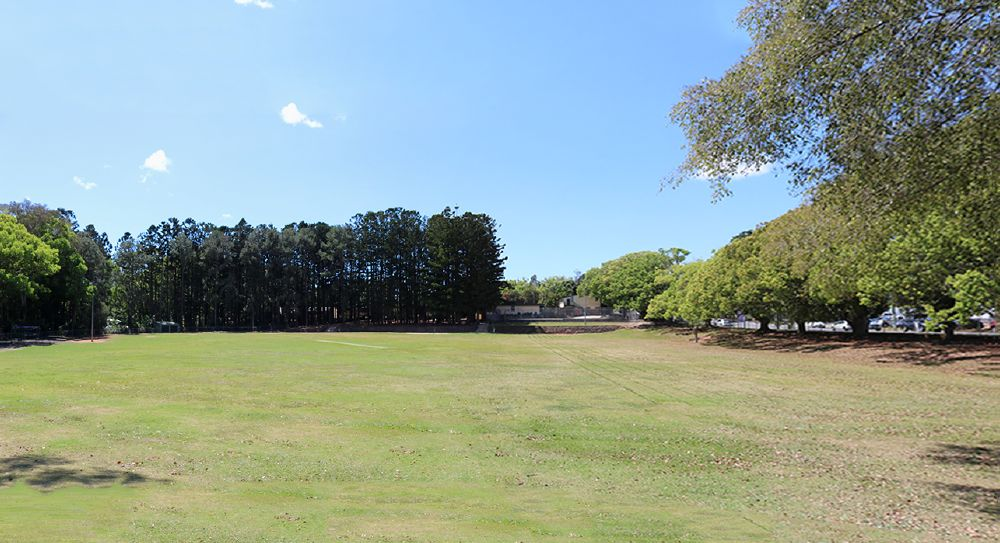
Sports ground with arboretum at left and centre and camphor laurels at right, 2019

A large, flat, manicured grass sports oval occupies the western half of the school grounds. Bordered by mature trees, the flat, manicured, and open lawn is a strikingly attractive and landmark feature in the hilly, treed landscape of the town.

=== Memorial Arboretum (by 1948) ===
An impressive stand of trees occupies a substantial area of the school grounds, wrapping around the sports ground on its north and east sides and forming a strikingly vivid feature. It comprises hundreds of mature pine trees planted closely together, some in plantation rows, without any understorey plantings. The majority of the trees are hoop pines (Araucaria cunninghamii) and the ground surface is natural earth.

As well as the trees of the Arboretum, the school grounds include other mature trees of heritage significance.

=== Views ===
There are attractive views to the sports oval, boundary camphor laurels, and the Arboretum from Main Street, forming a prominent element of the streetscape. There are also distinctive and attractive views from the Memorial Gate and the western side of the sports oval across the open flat lawn to the Arboretum, a route used for Anzac Day processions.

== Heritage listing ==
Buderim Mountain State School was listed on the Queensland Heritage Register on 3 May 2019 having satisfied the following criteria.

The place is important in demonstrating the evolution or pattern of Queensland's history.

Buderim Mountain State School (established elsewhere as Buderim Mountain Provisional School in 1875) is important in demonstrating the evolution of state education and its associated architecture in Queensland. The place retains excellent, representative examples of standard designs that were architectural responses to prevailing government educational philosophies, set in landscaped grounds with play areas, sporting facilities, and mature shade trees. Designed by the Department of Public Works to optimise natural light and ventilation, Block B (1951 extended 1954) and Block C (1959) were standard designs introduced to address post-war population increases.

The Buderim War Memorial Arboretum (1945–46), sports ground and facilities (initially established in the 1930s by the Anzac Memorial Park Committee) (1930–1957), and stone memorial gates (1953) were a large component of a broader "living memorial" which was established by the Buderim Mountain War Memorial Community Centre (BWMCC) following World War II (WWII) to commemorate those from the district who fought in World War I and WWII. War memorials are a tribute to those who served, and those who died, from a particular community. They are an important element of Queensland's towns and cities and are also important in demonstrating a common pattern of commemoration across Queensland and Australia.

The place is important in demonstrating the principal characteristics of a particular class of cultural places.

Buderim Mountain State School is important in demonstrating the principal characteristics of a Queensland state school. These include: teaching buildings designed to standard government designs; and a generous landscaped site with mature trees, assembly and play areas, and sporting facilities.

Block B (a Temporary Classroom Building) is an intact example of its standard type. It retains: its gable roof; lowset, timber-framed structure; north-facing, open verandah with bagracks; banks of timber-framed operable windows, French doors, and fanlights providing natural light and ventilation; and two 21 ft (6.4m) x 24 ft (7.3m) classrooms.

Block C (a High Set Timber Building with Semi-enclosed Stair) is an intact example of its standard type. It retains its: highset, gable-roofed form with semi-enclosed, covered play space under; timber-framed and -clad construction; north-facing open verandah as circulation to south-facing classroom; bagracks verandah balustrade; large banks of north and south-facing windows in classroom walls providing abundant natural light and ventilation; and 21 ft (6.4m) x 24 ft (7.3m) classroom.

The place is important because of its aesthetic significance.

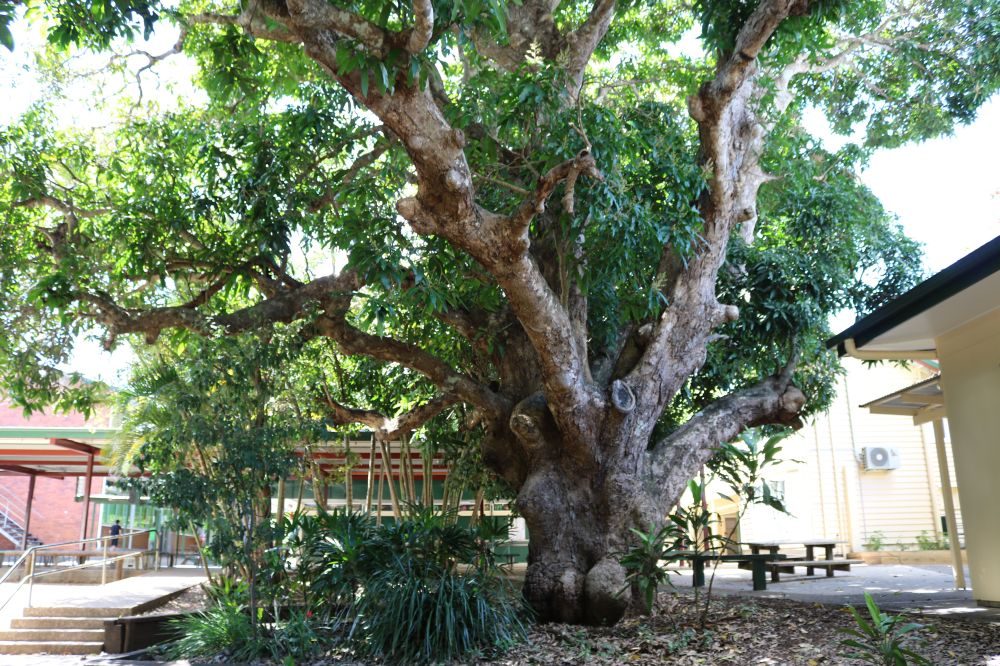
Mango tree, east of the arboretum, 2019

Buderim Mountain State School is important for its aesthetic significance brought about by its large manicured grass sports ground fringed by mature trees, a beautiful and conspicuous landmark in the main streetscape of Buderim. With attractive views to and from the place, and within the grounds, this setting includes a picturesque processional route from the memorial gates, across the open sports ground, into the closely-planted, soaring trees of the arboretum - a strikingly evocative, contrasting sequence. This route forms the final length of public commemorative war marches through the town and location for memorial ceremonies.

The place has a strong or special association with a particular community or cultural group for social, cultural or spiritual reasons.

Buderim Mountain State School has a strong and ongoing association with the wider Buderim community, and with former pupils, parents, staff members of the school. Established in 1875, generations of Buderim children have been taught at the school and it is important for its contribution to the educational development of Buderim and as a focus for the community.

Since their establishment, the War Memorial Arboretum (1945–6), sports ground (1930s-46) and memorial gates (1953) continue to play a significant role in the Buderim community's commemoration ceremonies, including Anzac Day and Remembrance Day. It represents the broader "Living Memorial" established by the BWMCC that continues today as the Buderim War Memorial Community Association.
