= Chancellor State College =

School in Queensland, Australia

Location
- Sippy Downs, Queensland; Australia; 26.7206°S 153.0591°E

Information
- Type: Public
- Motto: The Best We Can Be
- Established: 1997 (Primary Campus); 2004 (College)
- Principal: Leanne Jensen-Steele
- Enrolment: 2,922 (2023)
- Campus: Urban
- Colours: White, green & navy
- Mascot: Raider
- Website: chancellorsc.eq.edu.au

Chancellor State College is a public, co-educational, P-12, school located in the Buderim suburb of Sippy Downs, in Queensland, Australia. It is administered by the Department of Education, with an enrolment of 2,922 students and a teaching staff of 242, as of 2023. The school serves students from Prep to Year 12, on two campuses, the Primary on Scholars Drive and the Secondary on Sippy Downs Drive: Either side of the University of the Sunshine Coast.

== History ==
Chancellor State School opened on 28 January 1997, and closed on 31 December 2003, becoming Chancellor State College in 2004, offering both primary and secondary education.

In 2017, the College had 2,889 students from Prep through to Year 12.

The principal at the time, Jacqui King, was caught drunk driving on 14 January 2019. It was reported that she was four times over the legal limit.

== Achievements ==
Chancellor State College has had much success over its years of operations in the academic, sporting and cultural sectors, just to name a few. These successes include those of its RoboKings and RoboGems who were formed as part of the school's STEM program. The college Wind Symphony has also had its fair share of success at events such as Fanfare and Eisteddfod. For the past few years, the school's cross country team and the school's athletics team have had successful runs at their respective district's carnivals.

== Principals ==
Executive Principals of Chancellor State College have included:

- John Lockhart, 2004–2008
- Bevan Brennan, 2009–2012
- Barry Dittmann, 2013 (Acting)
- Glen Robinson, 2014 (Acting)
- Peter Kelly, 2014–2017
- Darrin Edwards, 2017 (Acting)
- Jacqui King, 2017–2019
- Leanne Jensen-Steele, 2019–2023
- Barry Dittmann 2023-2024
- Brad Robert , 2024- present

== See also ==
- List of schools in Queensland
