= Turrbal =

Aboriginal Australian people of Queensland

The Turrbal are an Aboriginal Australian people from the area now known as Brisbane. The boundaries of their traditional territory are unclear and linguists are divided over whether they spoke a separate language or a dialect of the Yuggera language. The Turrbal/Yuggera toponym for the central Brisbane area is Meanjin. (Note: Tom Petrie, who was fluent in the Turrbal language from his early youth, stated that "Meanjin" (Meeanujin) referred specifically to the area of "Garden Point from the bridge round to Creek-street, taking in the settlement." (Petrie 1901, p. 7))

== Name ==
The ethnonym Turrbal is an exonym which is thought to derive from the root turr/dhur (bora ring) and -bal, signifying "those who say turr or dhur for a bora ring", rather than using the other tribe's customary term bool. It was the toponym used in 1841 by native guides from Nundah who led the group of German Lutheran missionaries to the Ningy Ningy at what became Toorbul Point. The area around Nundah and Toombul is where German missionaries established the Zion Hill Mission.

== Language ==
Turrbal is considered either a dialect of the Yuggera language, or a separate language, one of five subgroups of the Durubalic branch of the Pama-Nyungan languages. Tom Petrie, son of one of the founding families of the Brisbane area settlements, mixed freely with the Turrbal, and mastered the language and the contiguous dialects from an early age. He stated that Turrbal was spoken from Gold Creek and Moggill, north as far as North Pine, and south to the Logan River. Connors, however, states that the Yaggera (Yuggera) language group spread south of the Brisbane River from the Brisbane River Valley to the present South Bank almost to Moreton Bay.

Meanjin (also Meeanjin, Mianjin) is a Turrbal/Yuggera word whose various etymologies suggest a meaning of "spike place" or "tulip wood". (Note: "The original name of Brisbane can be traced back to just two phonetic versions of the one name." The transcription variations range from Makandschin, Megandsin (exonym) Miantjun, Mientjin., Magoo-jin, Magandjin(from magan, tulipwood). The suggestion that it refers to a spike (migan) would allow various meanings such as "the shape of the point, ground being dug up, and weaponry". The (d)jin suffix marks a plural (of "place, district, river".) (Charlton 2023)) It was used for the area now covered by Gardens Point and the Brisbane central business district. The Turrbal called the early Brisbane settlement "Umpi Korrumba" meaning "many houses".

== Country ==
The Turrbal people's traditional lands lay around the Brisbane River. Tom Petrie stated that their land coincided with the territorial range of their language. Ford and Blake, however, state that the Turrbal and Jagera were distinct peoples, the Jagera generally living south of the Brisbane river and the Turrbal mostly living north. The group comprised a number of family clans, such as the Ngundari. Neighbouring Aboriginal peoples include the Gubbi Gubbi and Wakka Wakka to the north, the Dalla to the northwest and the Quandamooka of Moreton Bay.

At the time of European settlement, the Turrbal comprised local groups each of which had a "head man" and a specific territory. The European names for the locality groups, sometimes called clans, of the Brisbane area include the Duke of York's clan, the North Pine (or Petrie), the Coorpooroo, Chepara, Yerongpan and others.

Despite collective title to a stretch of land, the Turrbal permitted private ownership of specific sections of land. Petrie states:

Though the land belonged to the whole tribe, the head men often spoke of it as theirs. The tribe in general owned the animals and birds on the ground, also roots and nests, but certain men and women owned different fruit or flower-trees and shrubs. For instance, a man could own a bonyi (Araucaria bidwilli) tree, and a woman a minti (Banksia amula), dulandella (Persoonia Sp.), midyim (Myrtus tenuifolia), or dakkabin (Xanthorrhoea aborea) tree. Then a man sometimes owned a portion of the river which was a good fishing spot, and no one else could fish there without his permission.

== Mythology ==
In Turrbal thought, the origins of the division of the sexes was attributed to two nocturnal flying creatures. Menfolk all came from the billing (a small house bat). Women in turn had their descent from a wamankan (night-hawk). Given their mythic function, they could not be eaten, but capturing and killing them was permitted. (Note: Among the natives of Burnett, Mary and Dawson rivers, the common bat, deering, was the friend of all the men, while a small owl or night hawk, boorookapkap, was the friend of the women. T. Petrie reports that the blacks of Brisbane river believe that the bat, there called billing, made all their menfolk, and that the wamankan, or night hawk, made the women. In 1834, Rev L. E. Threlkeld reported that the tribe at Lake Macquarie, New South Wales, had a belief that a certain small bird was the first maker of women, and that the bat was venerated on the same grounds by the men. J. Dawson in 1881, describing the customs and beliefs of the Aborigines of western Victoria, states that the common bat belongs to the men, and the fern owl to the women (Mathews 1910, p. 47).)

== History ==
The explorer John Oxley, on first sighting the Turrbal in 1824, called them "about the strongest and best-made muscular men I have seen in any country".

The Turrbal's tracks form the basis of many modern-day roads. Waterworks Road from Ashgrove is built on a Turrbal track that leads to Mount Coot-tha. Turrbal people would go to Mount Coot-tha to collect honey (ku-ta) from the bees there; it is the place of the honey-bee dreaming. Similarly, Old Northern Road from Everton Hills is built on a Turrbal track that led to the site of a triennial Bunya feast in neighboring Wakka Wakka country.

Many suburbs and places in Brisbane have names derived from Turrbal/Yuggera words. Woolloongabba is derived from either woolloon-capemm meaning "whirling water", or from woolloon-gabba meaning "fight talk place". Toowong is derived from tuwong, the onomatopoeic name for the Pacific koel. Bulimba means "place of the magpie-lark". Indooroopilly is derived from either nyindurupilli meaning "gully of leeches", or from yindurupilly meaning "gully of running water". Enoggera is a corruption of the words yauar-ngari meaning "song and dance".

== Hunting and gathering economy ==
The Turrbal exploited a large range of local species of animals and insects as part of their daily cuisine. These may be divided into sea- and riverine food, mainland victuals, and vegetables.

=== Vegetables and fruit ===
- The Turrbal gathered the pencil yam (tarm) from scrub borders, where it was often found almost a metre underground.
- Shoots from the crowns of both (the cabbage-tree palm (binkar)) and the king palm (pikki) served as vegetables.
- A Blechnum species, a swamp fern called bangwal was a delicacy found in abundance, and generally consumed as a bread-like sidedish with fish or meat. a freshwater rush called (yimbun) was also harvested and once prepared, tasted like arrowroot.
- The Moreton Bay chestnut (mai), a root called bundal in Turrbal but more widely known as cunjevoi, Canavalia Obtusifolia beans, (yugam) and zamia nuts, though poisonous, were rendered edible by long soaking after the nuts were cracked. They were then roasted. Mai was pounded into a cake, (as were yugam beans, and bundal) and the word was later used to denote European bread. The 1889 book The Useful Native Plants of Australia records that "The seeds are eaten ... after cooking, as they are poisonous in the raw state. Some shipwrecked sailors in Northwest Australia were poisoned by them."
- geebung (dulandella) was relished and eaten raw, as were two varieties of wild fig, called respectively ngoa-nga and nyuta. white myrtle berries (midyim), located on sandy islands, like the dubbul berry, were much sought after as a sweet. Dogwood gum (denna) was also highly prized.
- The breadfruit (winnam) was chewed and sucked.

=== Meats ===
- A variety of snakes were eaten: the carpet snake (kabul); (Note: the word lies behind the Queensland toponym, Caboolture, "place of many carpet snakes" (Petrie & Petrie 1904, p. 80)) the black snake (tumgu); brown snake (kuralbang) and death-adder (mulunkun).
- Aside from lizards, two varieties of goanna were hunted, the larger one being called giwar, while the smaller variety was named barra. The echidna (kagarr), tortoises (binkin), turtle (bowaiya) (Note: Tortoises were associated with an area of Brisbane, now called New Farm and formerly called binkinba (place of the land tortoise) (Petrie & Petrie 1904, p. 82)) also formed part of their diet.
- Two varieties of kangaroo and possum were hunted, the groman or old man kangaroo and the murri, and the forest possum (kupi) and scrub possum (kappolla). Koalas (dumbripi) were also highly prized.
- The large black flying squirrel (panko), the small grey squirrel (chibur), the Quoll (mibur) were eaten, as was the flying fox (gramman) while the dingo (mirri) was not part of their diet, the pups being taken in order to be domesticated.
- Among the hunted avian species were the scrub turkey (wargun), the emu (ngurrun), the black swan (marutchi), native ducks (ngau'u), quail duwir, parrots (pillin) and cockatoos (kaiyar), the latter highly valued for the yellow topknots (billa billa) employed by men as a ceremonial adornment.

They often sought out goanna (magil) eggs, which could be found near ant nests in soft soil. The Turrbal would occasionally hunt marine animals, such as dugongs (yangon), porpoises (talobilla), tailor fish (punba), and mullet (andakal).

== Alternative names ==
Turubul, Turrubul, Turrubal, Terabul, Torbul, Turibul.

== Native title ==
Descendants of both the Turrbal and the Jagera (Yugara) consider themselves traditional custodians of the land over which much of Brisbane is built. Native claim applications were lodged respectively by the Turrbal in 1998 and the Jagera in 2011, and the two separate claims were combined in 2013. In January 2015, Justice Christopher Jessup for the Federal Court of Australia, in Sandy on behalf of the Yugara People v State of Queensland (No 2), rejected the claims on the basis that under traditional law, which was now lacking, none of the claimants would be considered to have such a land right. The decision was appealed before the full bench of the Federal Court, which on 25 July 2017 rejected both appeals, confirming the 2015 decision that native title does not exist in the greater Brisbane area.

== Notable people ==
- Daki-Yakka: Daki-Yakka was a leader who succeeded Toorbal, and whom white settlers called "the Duke of York". This nickname survived in the place-name for their camping site, "York's Hollow". The indigenous name for the location was Barrambin and it is now covered by Victoria Park and the Exhibition Ground.
- Kulkarawa. A young Turrbal woman who was taken from the tribe by an Indian escapee convict. The two survived the capsizing of a stolen boat, and landed up at Noosa Heads where they were looked after by the local tribe. The convict tired of life in the bush and returned to Brisbane, where the Turrbal killed him for taking one of their women without consent. Kulkarawa composed a song expressing her nostalgia for her clan and earlier life, which became popular when it was sung, to a special dance, at a bunya corroboree. She was eventually reunited with her family at Barranbin.
- Maroochy Barambah was an elder of Turrbal and Gubbi Gubbi ancestry and was an opera singer and performing artist.

== See also ==
- Jagera people

== Sources ==
- Bowern, Claire, ed. (2013). The Oxford Guide to Australian Languages. Oxford University Press. ISBN 978-0-198-82497-8.
- Carseldine, Amy (18 September 2017). "Negative Determination of Native Title Over Brisbane Upheld". Crown Law. Crown Law (Queensland Govt).
- Charlton, Gaja Kerry (Winter 2023). "Makunschan, Meeanjan, Miganchan, Meanjan, Magandjin". Meanjin.
- Connors, Libby (2015). Warrior: A legendary leader's dramatic life and violent death on the colonial frontier. Allen & Unwin. ISBN 978-1-760-11048-2.
- Crump, Des (16 March 2015). "Aboriginal languages of the Greater Brisbane Area". Aboriginal and Torres Strait Islander Languages. State Library of Queensland.
- Dixon, Robert M. W. (2002). Australian Languages: Their Nature and Development. Vol. 1. Cambridge University Press. ISBN 978-0-521-47378-1.
- Evans, Raymond (1992). "The mogwi take mi-an-jin: Race relations and the Moreton Bay penal settlement 1824-42". In Fisher, Rod (ed.). Brisbane: The Aboriginal presence, 1824-1860. The Brisbane History Group Papers. pp. 7–30.
- Fisher, Rod (2009). Boosting Brisbane: Imprinting the Colonial Capital of Queensland. Boolarong Press. ISBN 978-1-921-55522-0.
- Ford, Roger; Blake, Thom (1998). Indigenous Peoples in Southeast Queensland: an annotated guide to ethno-historical sources. Woolloonbabba, Qld: The Foundation for Aboriginal and Islander Research Action (FAIRA). ISBN 1-876487-00-3.
- Hall, Noeline (1974). "Thomas (Tom) Petrie (1831–1910)". Australian Dictionary of Biography.
- "History". Turrbal Aboriginal Nation, Traditional Owners of Meanjin (Brisbane). Archived from the original on 14 February 2020.
- "History of Brisbane's Woolloongabba". ourbrisbane.com. Archived from the original on 7 June 2011.
- Maiden, J. H. (1889). The useful native plants of Australia: Including Tasmania. Sydney: Turner and Henderson.
- "Maroochy Barambah". AustLit. 29 August 2019.
- Mathews, R. H. (1910). "Die Bundandaba-Zeremonie in Queensland' (The Bundandaba Ceremony of Initiation in Queensland)". Mitteilungen der Anthropologischen Gesellschaft in Wien. 40: 44–47 – via press-files.anu.edu.au.
- "Our Story". Turrbal Tribe.
- Petrie, Tom (10 September 1901). "The Old Brisbane Blacks". Brisbane Courier – via Trove.
- Petrie, Tom; Petrie, Constance Campbell (1904). Tom Petrie's Reminiscences of Early Queensland (PDF). Brisbane: Watson, Ferguson & Co – via Internet Archive.
- Riga, Rachel (28 January 2015). "Turrbal-Yugara native title claim over Brisbane rejected". ABC News.
- "Sandy on behalf of the Yugara People v State of Queensland (No 2) [2015] FCA 15". Federal Court (Australia)Federal Court of Australia. 27 January 2015.
- Steele, John Gladstone (2015) [First published 1984]. Aboriginal Pathways: in Southeast Queensland and the Richmond River. University of Queensland Press. ISBN 978-0-702-25742-1.
- Tindale, Norman (1974). Aboriginal Tribes of Australia, Jagara (QLD). Australian National University Press.
- Turrbal Association (1998). An Indigenous History of Waterworks Road, Brisbane. Ann Wallin & Associates.
- de Vries, Jake; de Vries, Susanna (2012). Historic Brisbane: Convict Settlement to River City. Boolarong Press. ISBN 978-1-922-10980-4.
- Watson, Frederick James (1944). Vocabularies of Four Representative Tribes of South Eastern Queensland. Brisbane: Royal Geographical Society of Australasia.
