= Undanbi =

Aboriginal Australian people

The Undanbi are an Aboriginal Australian people of southern Queensland. Alternative or clan names include Inabara, Djindubari and Ningy Ningy (also spelt Ningyningy and other variants).

== Name ==
The autonym Undanbi is formed from their word for 'man' (dan).

== Language ==
The Undanbi spoke a dialect mutually intelligible with that of the Jagera and Turrbal peoples, and it was apparently the dialect mastered by Tom Petrie.

== Country ==
The Undanbi occupied an estimated 900 square miles (2,300 km^{2}) around the coastal strip along Coolum Beach and Moreton Bay, reaching down from Noosa Heads as far south as the estuary of the Brisbane River. It extended inland, around 10 miles (16 km), to the area of Pine River, and the Glasshouse Mountains. They also had a foothold on Bribie Island.

The western neighbours of the coastal Undanbi were the Dalla.

== Social organisation ==
The Undanbi were divided into several groups or clans:

- The Inabara (the furthest north, near Noosa Heads)
- The Djindubari on Bribie Island
- The Ningyningy (southernmost clan, around Toorbul and Redcliffe)

Physically, the Undanbi were known for their impressive builds, which marked them off from members of tribes like the Dalla, who were generally slighter.

The Ningyningy (also spelt Ningy Ningy), the most southerly Undanbi clan, are sometimes given as located also on Bribie Island. The explorer Ludwig Leichhardt, for one, in referring to the Bribie Island aborigines, wrote of them as 'Nynga-Nynga blacks.' Their dialect was called Oondoo, and their ethnonym meant 'oysters' in the Maroochy dialect. They were distinguished from the Djindubari, who used charcoal and bees' wax to blacken themselves, by painting themselves with red ochre clan markings. By the mid 1840s, it is thought that many of the encampments in the Brisbane area arose from the Undanbi remnants of the Ningyningy and Djindubari who mustered there for blanket handouts and became notorious for their pitched battles, with the Turrbal clansmen under Daki Yakka, (known to the whites as the Duke of York). By the 1850s these northern refugees were thought to be trying to exterminate the Brisbane blacks, and bought the brunt of accusations that the black presence in the area was causing endless trouble.

In colonial tradition they were reputed to be highly aggressive, though they had formerly kept the three castaways Thomas Pamphlett, John Finnegan and Richard Parsons from dying of starvation after they came across them at Clontarf Point, and by treating them hospitably for three months until John Oxley located them.

Their memory is evoked in the present-day place name for the town of Nimbi.

== History of contact ==
The Brisbane group of the Undanbi was said to have become extinct within a few decades of white settlement. Archibald Meston stated they had died off by 1860. Other testimony suggests a number were still alive, in 1883, at Mooloolaba.

== Words ==
- tchaceroo (Strepera graculina). Meston identified this as the pied crow shrike, now called the pied currawong, and suggested that this word from the Brisbane Churrabool dialect lies behind the Australian word jackeroo, dating its adoption from the Undambi (Churrabool refers according to Tindale, to them) via the German Lutheran Zion Hill Mission established at Nundah in 1848. (Note: Another word used throughout Australia is "jackeroo," the term for a "newchum," or recent arrival, who is acquiring his first colonial experience on a sheep or cattle station. It has a goodnatured, somewhat sarcastic meaning, free from all offensive significance. It is generally used for young fellows during their first year or two of station life. The origin of the word is now given for the first time. It dates backs to 1838, the year the German missionaries arrived on the Brisbane River, and was the name bestowed upon them by the aboriginals. The Brisbane blacks spoke a dialect called "Churrabool," in which the word "jackeroo" or "tchaceroo" was the name of the pied crow shrike, Stripera graculina, one of the noisiest and most garrulous birds in Australia. The blacks said the white men (the missionaries) were always talking, a gabbling race, and so they called them " jackeroo," equivalent to our word " gabblers." (Meston 1895, p. 32))

== Alternative names ==
- Bo-oobera
- Churrabool
- Dippil (a generic name for a language applied to Undanbi and also, at time, to the Gabi-Gabi speaking Gubbi Gubbi tribes) (Note: "Some of the early confusion in the literature on the tribes in the southeastern part of Queensland was engendered by the multiplicity of general terms. One often used with Dippil, applied to several tribes between Brisbane and Maryborough. Mathews, seeking supratribal groupings, called these tribes collectively the 'Dippil Nation' and cited the Brisbane horde of the Undanbi, which he called 'Turrubul' to demonstrate the marriage system present among them. As in other areas the 'nation' concept is untenable except as satisfying a classificatory demand by those unwilling to accept the idea of nonnational units" (Tindale 1974, p. 125))
- Djindubari (the horde on Bribie Island)
- Djuadubari, Jooaduburrie
- Mooloola (river name)
- Ninge Ninge
- Nynga-Nynga
- Oondumbi
- Turrubul, Turrbul (language name)
- Undumbi

Source: Tindale 1974, p. 186

== Sources ==
- Aurousseau, M., ed. (2010). The Letters of F. W. Ludwig Leichhardt (PDF). Ashgate Publishing. ISBN 978-1-409-41500-8.
- Cryle, Denis (1992). "'Snakes in the grass': The press and race relations at Moreton Bay 1846-47". In Fisher, Rod (ed.). Brisbane: The Aboriginal presence, 1824-1860 (PDF). The Brisbane History Group Papers. pp. 69–79.
- Dutton, Tom (1983). "The origin and spread of Aboriginal Pidgin English in Queensland and: A Preliminary Account" (PDF). Aboriginal History. 7 (1–2): 90–122.
- Fisher, Rod (1992). "From depredation to Degradation: The Aboriginal experience at Morton Bay, 1842-1860". In Fisher, Rod (ed.). Brisbane: The Aboriginal presence, 1824-1860. The Brisbane History Group Papers. pp. 31–47.
- Haglund, Laila (1976). The Broadbeach Aboriginal Burial Ground: An Archaeological Analysis (PDF). St Lucia, Qld: University of Queensland Press. ISBN 0-7022-0860-4.
- Lang, J. D. (1861). Queensland, Australia; a highly eligible field for emigration, and the future cotton-field of Great Britain: with a disquisition on the origin, manners, and customs of the aborigines (PDF). London: E. Stanford.
- McPhee, Daryl (2017). Environmental History and Ecology of Moreton Bay. Csiro Publishing. ISBN 978-1-486-30722-7.
- Meston, Archibald (1895). Geographic History of Queensland. Dedicated to the Queensland People (PDF). Queensland Government Printer.
- Petrie, Tom; Petrie, Constance Campbell (1904). Tom Petrie's reminiscences of early Queensland (PDF). Brisbane: Watson, Ferguson & Co.
- Steele, John Gladstone (1984). Aboriginal Pathways: in Southeast Queensland and the Richmond River. University of Queensland Press. ISBN 978-0-702-25742-1.
- Tindale, Norman Barnett (1974). "Undanbi (QLD)". Aboriginal Tribes of Australia: Their Terrain, Environmental Controls, Distribution, Limits, and Proper Names. Australian National University Press. Archived from the original on 11 October 2017.
- Van Toorn, Penny (2008). "Slave brands or cicatrices? Writings on Aboriginal skin in Tom Petrie's 'Reminiscences of Early Queensland'". Biography. 31 (2). University of Hawai'i Press: 223–244. doi:10.1353/bio.0.0011. JSTOR 23541027. S2CID 201743016.
