= Djindubari =

Aboriginal Australian people

The Djindubari, also written Jindoobarrie or Joondubarri, are or were an Aboriginal Australian people of southern Queensland, whose traditional lands were located on Bribie Island. They are thought to be a horde or clan of the Undanbi.

== Language ==
According to Tom Petrie, the word koala apparently derived from the Djindubari language, where it was called kulla. According to Archibald Meston the dialect itself was called Nhulla. Meston took down a wordlist of 300 items, together with 40 sentences to illustrate the grammar, in 1874.

== People ==
Generally Europeans described the Djindubari as 'a race of tall fine men and women. The women of Bribie Island generally were described by a member of Oxley's party in 1823 as: 'Tall, straight, well-formed women, far superior in beauty to the men; in fact, to any natives of this country I have ever seen, two of them as handsome as any white women.' Their population at the earliest colonial reckoning was estimated at around 66, roughly 30 men, 16 women and 20 children.

The word for the Bora ceremonial rites of initiation on Bribie Island was Dooroo. Colonial observers considered the Djindubari very warlike, regarded with terror by the tribes on the mainland opposite, and, putatively unlike the latter, given to cannibalism.

== Country ==
Yarun was the name given by the Djindubari to their land, which was subsequently renamed Bribie Island. Norman Tindale regarded the Djindubari as a horde, restricted to Bribie Island, and thus a subunit of a larger tribe, the Undanbi, which he describes as occupying some 900 square miles (2,300 km^{2}) of territory including the coastal land along Coolum Beach and Moreton Bay, extending from Noosa Heads southwards to the mouth of the Brisbane River, and inland for some ten miles, towards the Pine River district. They were also around the Glasshouse Mountains. The Djindubari formed part of the Gubbi Gubbi tribe. The islanders were described in the 1820s as being settled in fishing villages, composed of clusters of huts, some of them of substantial size, one being described as extending over 24 metres in length, and built with arches, rooms and passageways which, he added, 'would not have disgraced a European architect'.

== History of contact with whites ==
Matthew Flinders was the first European surveyor known to have landed on the island and to have come into contact with the Djindubari. The incident took place in 1799, and a skirmish broke out, due to a misunderstanding over trading negotiations for a fishing net, in which an attempt was made to snatch Flinders' hat. As Flinders' boat drew away, sticks and, finally, a spear was thrown at them by the jeering Djindubari. Flinders, desiring to impress the islanders with his power, ordered musketeers to open fire, wounding two or three natives, who then fled. After a week, Flinders revisited the island, and it would appear no long term enmity had been aroused, since relations were described as friendly. Some Scottish sailors danced a Highland jig, while the Djindubari responded with a plaintive song that was 'musical and soothing'. Flinders remarked on their large heads, though derogatively characterising one as baboon-like. Two men of the tribe were victims of the massacre of aborigines by poisoning while they visited Kilcoy.

By 1894 Meston stated that the tribe had been reduced to just one man and woman.

== Alternative names ==
- Undumbi
- Oondumbi
- Mooloola (name of a river)
- Turrubul (language name) Turrbul/Churrabool
- Djuadubari/Jooaduburrie
- Bo-oobera
- Dippil

== Some words ==
- goom (no)
- bootellim (koala)
- gnundial (mullet)
- mooloom (whiting)
- ginnbamm (bream)
- geebarra (catfish)
- boomamdarra (stingaree)
- carahbill (shark)
- narrang shovelnose
- boolooibillam (porpoise)
- cammeem (turtle)
- moothoong (whale)
- ganbing/yulu (eels)
- balboora (foot)

== Bibliography ==
- Connors, Libby (2005). "Dundalli (1820–1855)". Australian Dictionary of Biography Australian Dictionary of Biography, Supplement. Melbourne University Press.
- Connors, Libby (2015). Warrior: A legendary leader's dramatic life and violent death on the colonial frontier. Allen & Unwin. ISBN 978-1-760-11048-2.
- Evans, Raymond (2007). A History of Queensland. Cambridge University Press. ISBN 978-0-521-87692-6.
- Lang, John Dunmore (1847). Cooksland in North-eastern Australia: The Future Cottonfield of Great Britain: Its Characteristics and Capabilities for European Colonization. With a Disquisition on the Origin, Manners, and Customs of the Aborigines (PDF). Longman, Brown, Green and Longmans.
- Meston, Archibald (1895). Geographic History of Queensland (PDF). Government Printer, Brisbane.
- Meston, Archibald (20 October 1923). "Old Moreton Bay tribes; their languages". Brisbane Courier. p. 18 – via Trove.
- Petrie, Tom; Petrie, Constance Campbell (1904). Tom Petrie's reminiscences of early Queensland. Brisbane: Watson, Ferguson & Co.
- Steele, John Gladstone (2015). Aboriginal Pathways: in Southeast Queensland and the Richmond River. University of Queensland Press. ISBN 978-0-702-25742-1.
- Tindale, Norman (1974). Aboriginal Tribes of Australia, Undanbi (QLD). Australian National University Press.
