= Balmoral Ridge, Queensland =

Balmoral Ridge
- Suburb
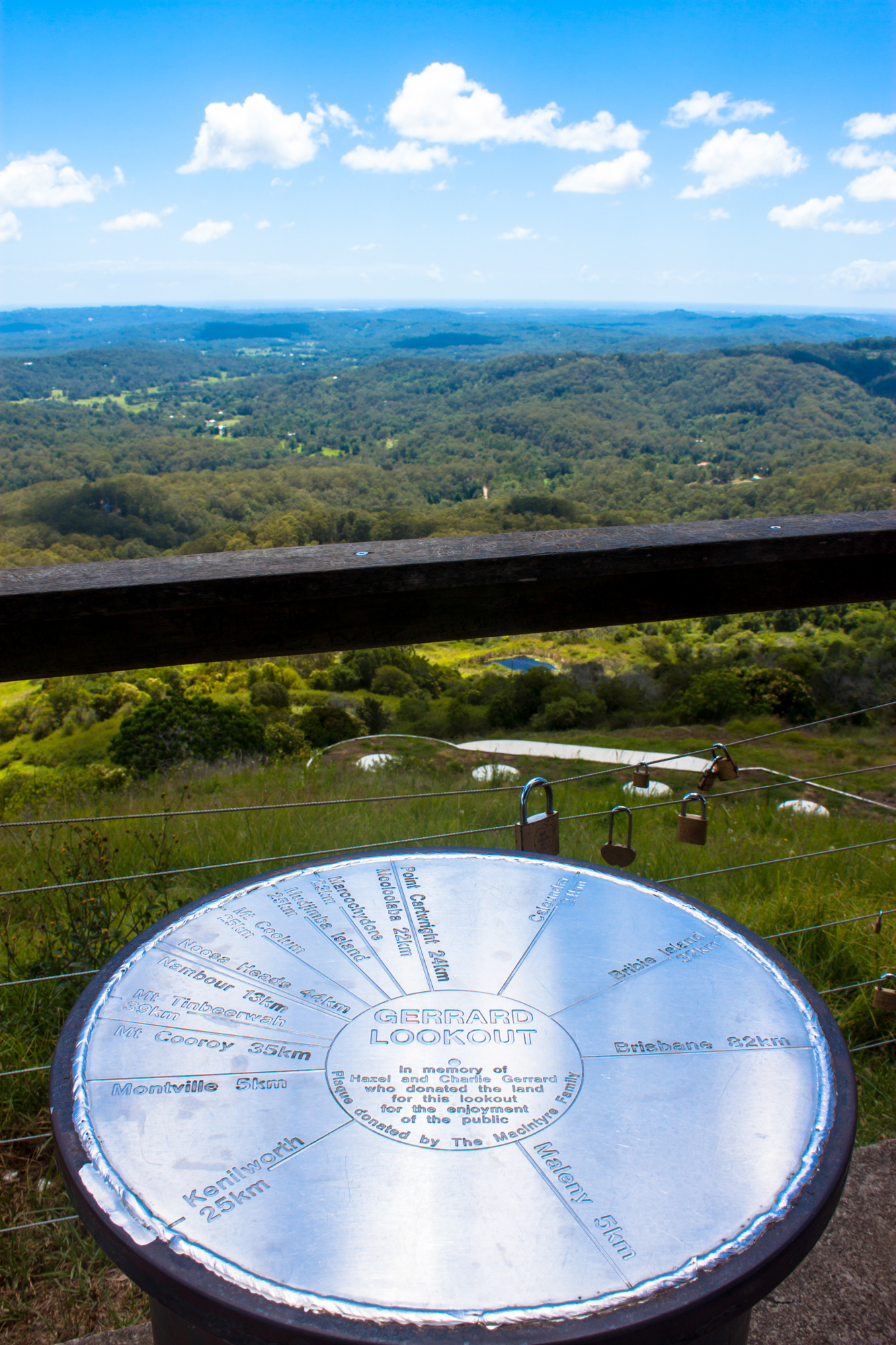
- Gerrard Lookout, 2015

- Interactive map of Balmoral Ridge
- Coordinates: 26.7436°S 152.8916°E
- Country: Australia
- State: Queensland
- City: Sunshine Coast
- LGA: Sunshine Coast Region
- Location: 4.9 km (3.0 mi) E of Maleny; 26.5 km (16.5 mi) SW of Nambour; 29.5 km (18.3 mi) W of Caloundra; 97.2 km (60.4 mi) N of Brisbane

Government
  - State electorate: Glass House
  - Federal division: Fisher

Area
  - Total: 9.5 km^{2} (3.7 sq mi)

Population
  - Total: 302 (2021 census)
  - Density: 31.79/km^{2} (82.3/sq mi)
- Time zone: UTC+10:00 (AEST)
- Postcode: 4552
Suburbs around Balmoral Ridge
North Maleny	Montville	Eudlo
North Maleny	Balmoral Ridge	Diamond Valley
North Maleny	Maleny	Bald Knob

Balmoral Ridge is a rural locality in the Sunshine Coast Region, Queensland, Australia. In the 2021 census, Balmoral Ridge had a population of 302 people.

== Geography ==
Balmoral Ridge is 82 kilometres (51 mi) north of Brisbane on the Blackall Range in the Sunshine Coast hinterland.

In the north the locality lies adjacent to Baroon Pocket Dam. Balmoral Lookout is located on a prominent ridge of the range along Maleny Montville Road. Obi Obi Creek marks a majority of the western boundary.

Maleny–Montville Road passes through from south to north-east.

== History ==
Traditionally the district was informally known as Balmoral. However, in 1989 when the Caloundra City Council asked to make it an official place name, the Queensland Government was concerned about potential for confusion with Balmoral in the City of Brisbane and decided that it be officially named Balmoral Ridge.

== Demographics ==
In the 2011 census, Balmoral Ridge recorded a population of 281 people, 53.7% female and 46.3% male. The median age of the Balmoral Ridge population was 55 years, 18 years above the national median of 37. 68.2% of people living in Balmoral Ridge were born in Australia. The other top responses for country of birth were England 5.7%, New Zealand 4.3%, Scotland 1.4%, Finland 1.4%, Canada 1.1%. 87.8% of people spoke only English at home; the next most common languages were 1.8% Afrikaans, 1.8% German.

In the 2016 census, Balmoral Ridge had a population of 278 people.

In the 2021 census, Balmoral Ridge had a population of 302 people.

== Education ==
There are no schools in Balmoral Ridge. The nearest government primary schools are Montville State School in neighbouring Montville to the north and Maleny State School in neighbouring Maleny to the south. The nearest government secondary school is Maleny State High School, also in Maleny.

== Attractions ==
There are two lookouts in Balmoral Ridge, both on the Maleny Montville Road:

- Gerrard Lookout (26.7315°S 152.9019°E)
- Balmoral Lookout (26.7394°S 152.8972°E)

== See also ==
- Blackall Range road network
