= Dalaipi =

Headman of the Turrbal people

Dalaipi or Dalaipie (c. 1795 – c. 1863) was an Aboriginal Australian elder, a headman, guide, songman, mediator and philosopher in the Pine Rivers area north of Brisbane, Queensland. He was also known as Deliapee, Deliape, Dolaibi, Daleipy, Delaibi, and Dailpie. Dalaipi was a distinguished elder of the North Pine clan of the Turrbal people.

Dalaipi interacted with Andrew Petrie, one of Brisbane’s early settlers and helped to care for his son, Thomas. Details of his life and traditions were preserved in Thomas Petrie's Reminiscences of Early Queensland (1904). According to Petrie, Dalaipi was the head man of the North Pine tribe, located north of Brisbane. His mother tongue was probably Turrbal, Yugara, or Nalbo.

Between the 1850s and 1890s Christian missionaries in the region challenged Aboriginal spirituality. Dalaipi was one of the authors, together with Dalinkua, of a series of statements that appeared in the local newspapers contrasting the settlers and missionaries religious teachings with their treatment of the local Aboriginal communities.

== See also ==
- List of Indigenous Australian historical figures
