= North Maleny, Queensland =

North Maleny
- Suburb
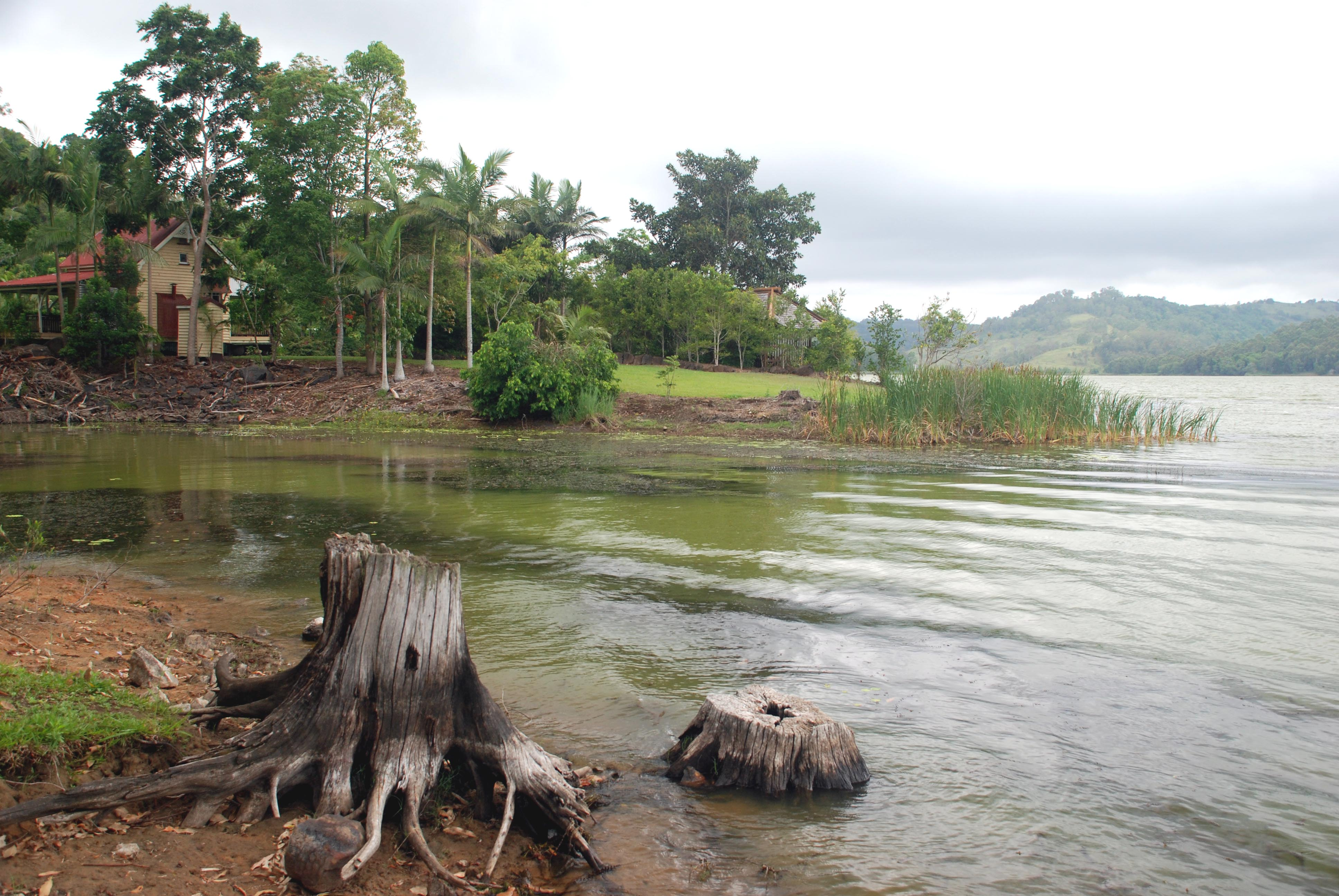
- Lake Baroon, 2008

- Interactive map of North Maleny
- Coordinates: 26.7261°S 152.8730°E
- Country: Australia
- State: Queensland
- LGA: Sunshine Coast Region
- Location: 3.2 km (2.0 mi) NE of Maleny; 33.8 km (21.0 mi) SW of Nambour; 35.9 km (22.3 mi) WNW of Caloundra; 103 km (64 mi) N of Brisbane

Government
  - State electorate: Glass House
  - Federal division: Fisher

Area
  - Total: 23.2 km^{2} (9.0 sq mi)

Population
  - Total: 710 (2021 census)
  - Density: 30.60/km^{2} (79.3/sq mi)
- Time zone: UTC+10:00 (AEST)
- Postcode: 4552
Suburbs around North Maleny
Witta	Montville	Montville
Maleny	North Maleny	Balmoral Ridge
Maleny	Balmoral Ridge	Balmoral Ridge

North Maleny is a rural locality in the Sunshine Coast Region, Queensland, Australia. In the 2021 census, North Maleny had a population of 710 people.

== Geography ==
The Baroon Pocket Dam is in the north-east of the locality; it impounds Obi Obi Creek creating Lake Baroon.

Part of Kondalilla National Park is in the north-west of the locality.

== History ==
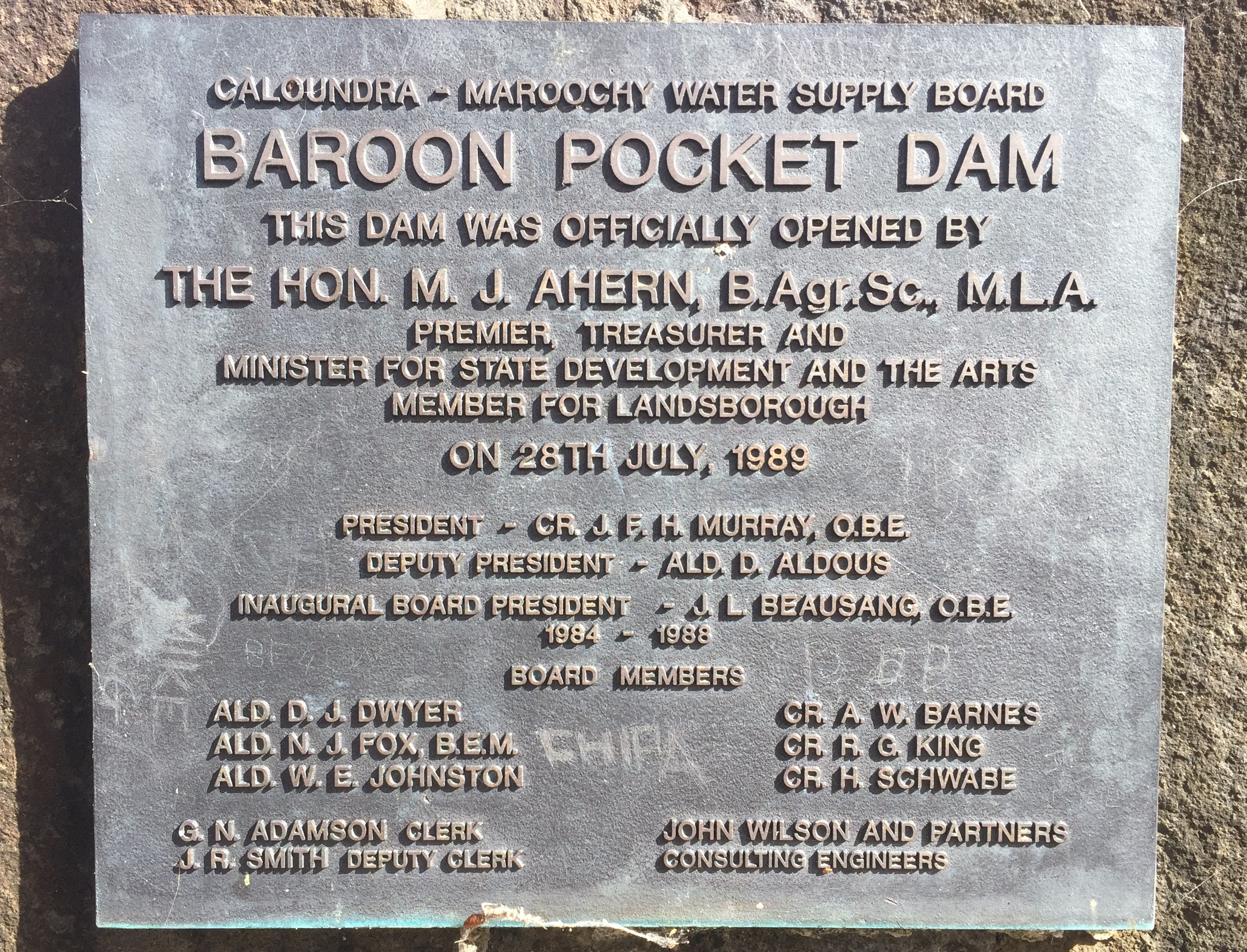
Plaque from the opening of the Baroon Pocket Dam

The Maleny Provisional School opened on 22 July 1897, becoming Maleny State School on 1 January 1909. It was renamed Maleny North State School in 1913 (probably because of the opening on Maleny Township State School in nearby Maleny) but closed in 1914. On 27 February 1922, it reopened as Maleny North Provisional School, becoming Maleny North State School on 4 July 1927. It finally closed in 1953.

The Baroon Pocket Dam was officially opened by Queensland Premier Mike Ahern on 28 July 1989.

== Demographics ==
In the 2016 census, North Maleny had a population of 621 people.

In the 2021 census, North Maleny had a population of 710 people.

== Education ==
There are no schools in North Maleny. The nearest government primary schools are Maleny State School in neighbouring Maleny to the south-west and Montville State School in neighbouring Montville to the north-east. The nearest government secondary school is Maleny State High School, also in Maleny.

== Attractions ==
Lake Baroon is an important recreation area for the Sunshine Coast hinterland. There is a sailing club, naval cadet unit, fishing club, accommodation and picnic facilities.
