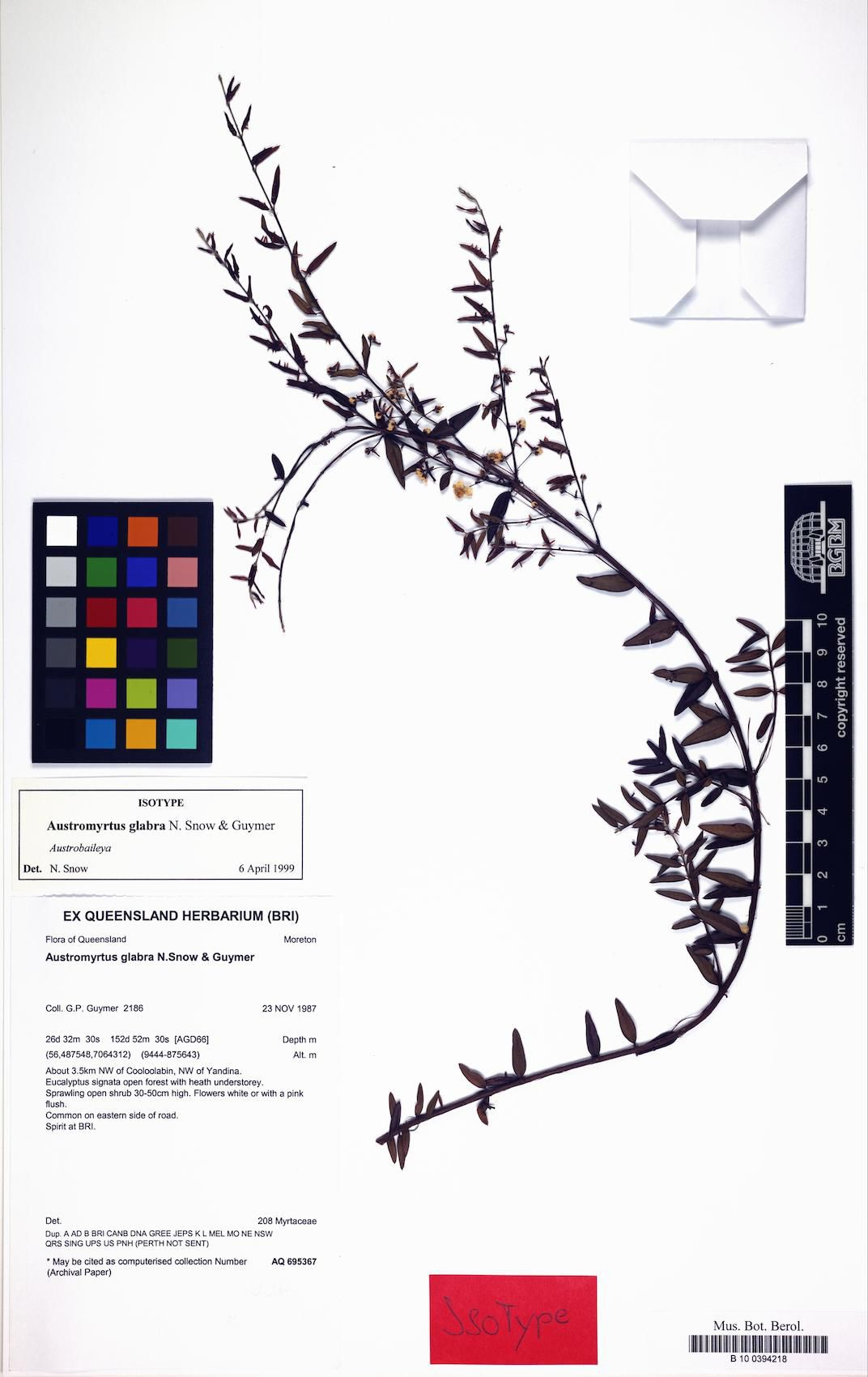
- (isotype) AQ695367

Scientific classification
- Kingdom: Plantae
- Clade: Embryophytes
- Clade: Tracheophytes
- Clade: Spermatophytes
- Clade: Angiosperms
- Clade: Eudicots
- Clade: Rosids
- Order: Myrtales
- Family: Myrtaceae
- Genus: Austromyrtus
- Species: A. glabra

Binomial name
- Austromyrtus glabra N.Snow & Guymer
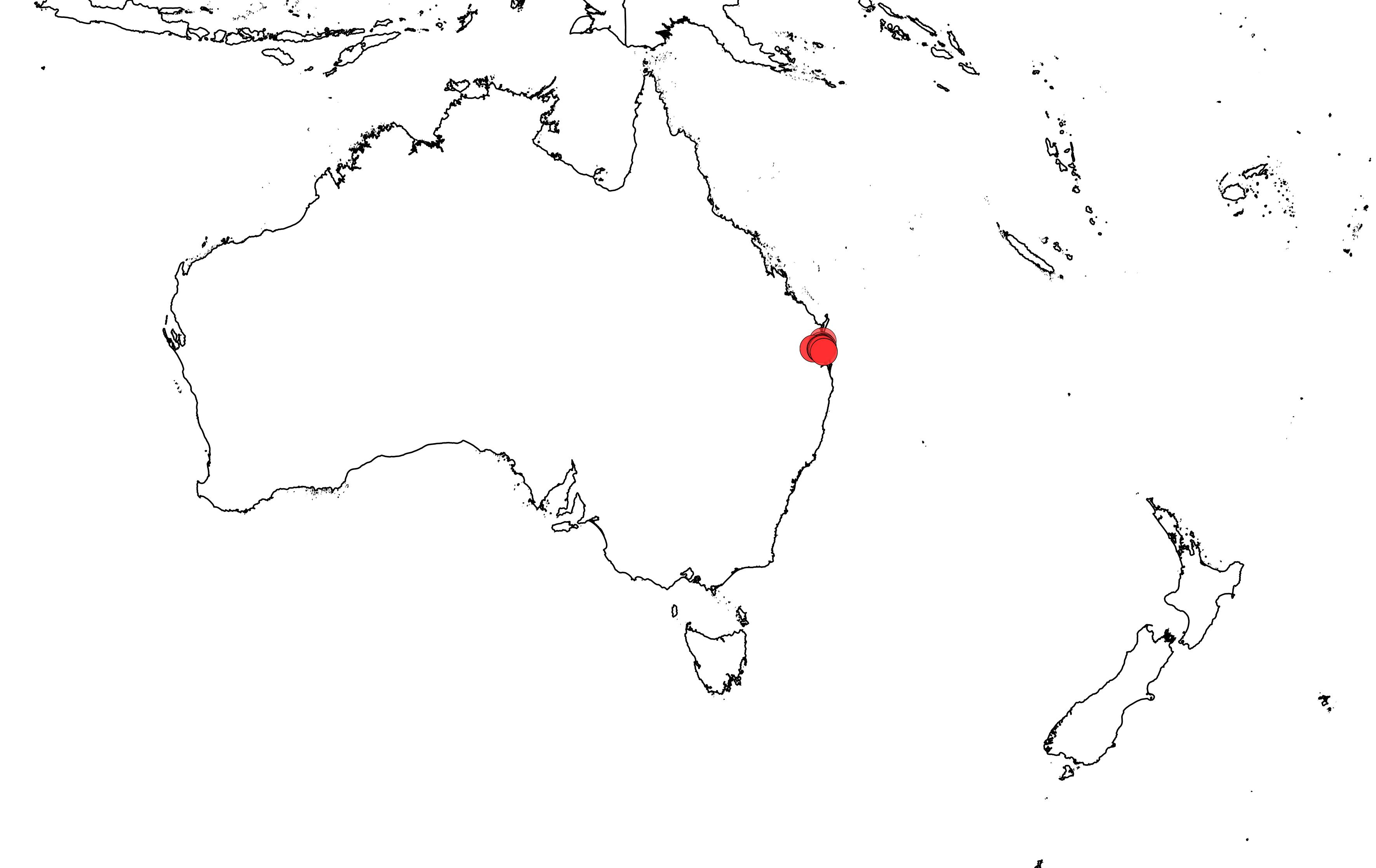
- Occurrence data from AVH

= Austromyrtus glabra =

Species of flowering plant

Austromyrtus glabra is a species of plant in the Myrtaceae family that is native to south-east Queensland, Australia. Austromyrtus glabra grows to a height of 1 m (3 ft 3 in). Leaves are opposite, aromatic when crushed, 10 to 20 mm (0.39 to 0.79 in) long and do not have hairs on the underside of the leaf unlike the related A. dulcis. It has white flowers that measure about 10 mm (0.39 in) in size and appear in spring and summer. The berry is 10 mm (0.39 in) in size and are edible. It can be found growing in eucalypt forests and on rocky soils.
