= Kondalilla National Park =

National park in Australia

Kondalilla Tops National Park
- IUCN category II (national park)
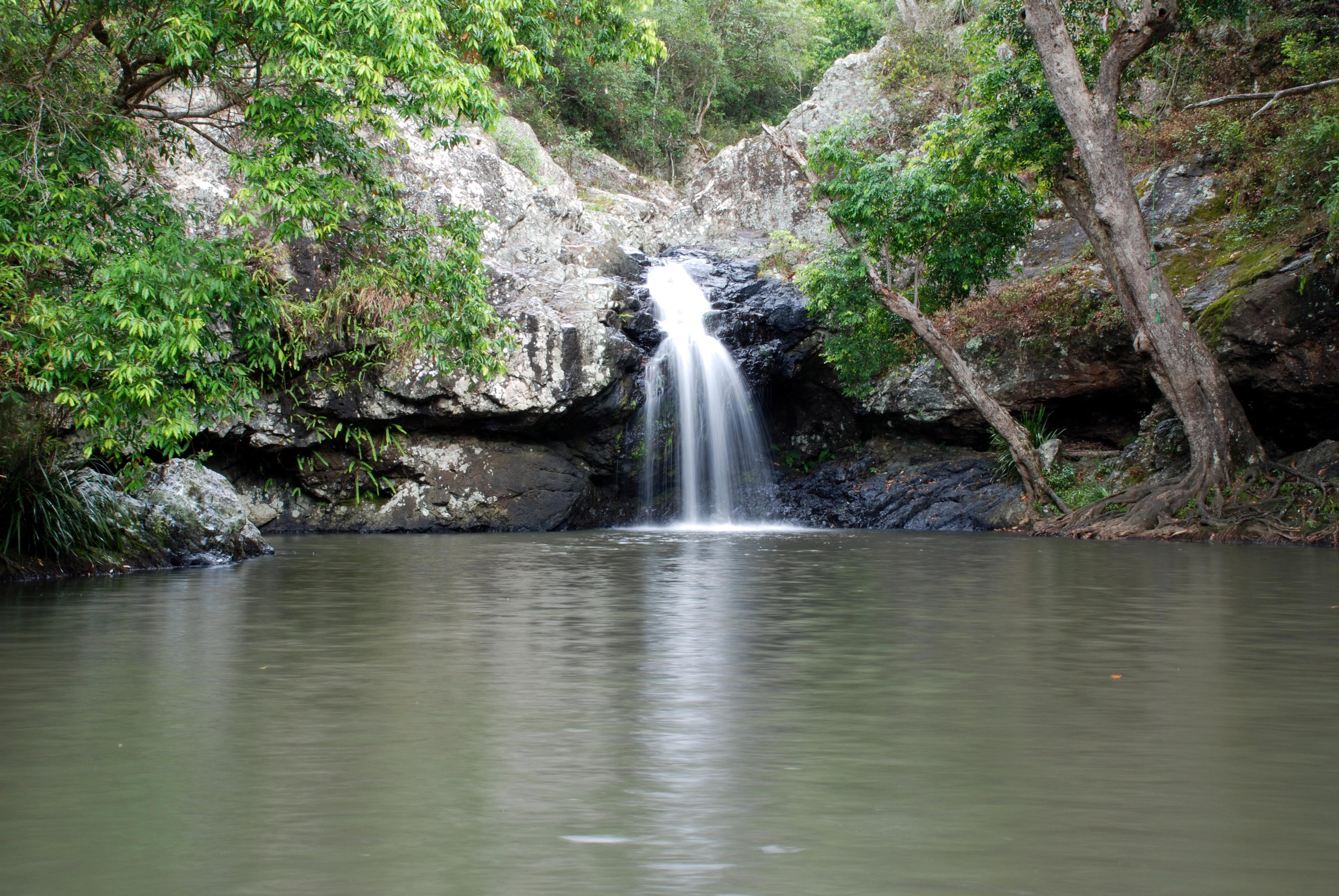
- Pool above Kondalilla Falls

- Location within Queensland
- Location: Queensland
- Nearest city: Mapleton, Queensland
- Coordinates: 26°40′05″S 152°51′30″E
- Area: 3.27 km^{2} (1.26 sq mi)
- Established: 1945
- Governing body: Queensland Parks and Wildlife Service
- Website: Official website

Kondalilla is a national park in the Blackall Range of South East Queensland, Australia, 91 km north of Brisbane. William Skene founded this area on his property while searching for lost cattle. He named it Bon Accord before giving it to the Queensland Government who, during the fifties, renamed it Kondalilla which is an Aboriginal word for running water. The area was first officially protected in 1906 as a recreational area, becoming a national park in 1945.

Access is easiest by road from Flaxton, east of the park. There is a large picnic area where there are toilet facilities (non potable water). There are two tracks which lead to the upper falls swimming hole. A longer circuit track will take you to the bottom pool which is not suitable for swimming. Allow at least two hours for the circuit trip, which in some places is close to the cliff edge and is not fenced.

Camping in the park is not permitted.

== History ==
=== Bonyee festival ===
For countless generations, the Blackall Range has held spiritual significance for many Aboriginal people throughout South East Queensland.

Abundant bunya pines growing throughout this area produced large nut crops, providing enough food for huge gatherings. When the nut crop peaked every three years, Kabi Kabi and neighbouring Wakka Wakka people hosted the Bonyee Festival. Many invited guests travelled great distances from coastal and inland areas to share food, songs and dances, arrange marriages, and other social interactions. A large grassy area near Baroon Pocket was an important gathering place.

=== Pastoralists and timber-getters ===
From 1842 until 1860, the Blackall Range was part of a large reserve declared by Governor Gipps to protect the bunya pine food source for local Indigenous groups. It was illegal to settle or clear land where bunya pines occurred.

When reserve status was rescinded, pastoralists and timber-getters came. In the 1880s, prized timber including red cedar, white beech, bunya pine, blackbutt and tallowwood was logged in the Blackall Range. The forest around Kondalilla was logged heavily and the ring-barked trees can still be seen today along the Picnic Creek circuit. Widespread clearing of the tableland forests ensued as settlement proceeded. However, some small areas were set aside for recreation.

=== Recreational use ===
From the early 1900s, people began visiting this area for its "natural scenery, waterfalls and spectacular views".

The first area to be protected was Kondalilla—in 1906 it became a recreational area, then a national park in 1945. Since then, reserves have been added across the Blackall Range to protect remnants of its natural communities. Kondalilla National Park (327ha) was linked to Obi Obi National Park in 1988. With other additions, including former State forest, the park has increased in size to 1591ha.

Mapleton Falls (26ha) became a national park in 1973, after being a reserve for recreational and scenic purposes for 38 years. Mapleton National Park (10064ha) was gazetted on 28 March 2014 and is an amalgamation of Mapleton Forest Reserve and Delicia Road Conservation Park.

== Fauna ==
The park provides habitat for 107 bird species. It is also home to the rare Pouched Frog. The vulnerable plant species, Macadamia ternifolia, also known as the Bopple Nut, grows in the park.

== Flora ==
Protected within the park is remnant subtropical rainforest. The park contains stands of piccabeen palms, pink ash, hoop pines and casuarinas as well as eucalypt forests and rainforest. The stand of bunya pines is the most easterly in Australia.

== Walking Tracks ==
Picnic Creek Circuit (Class 2)

Distance: 1.7 km

Time: Allow 45 minutes

Kondalilla Falls Circuit (Class 3)

Distance: 4.7 km

Time: Allow 2hrs

=== Sunshine Coast Hinterland Great Walk ===
Distance: 58.8 km

Time: At least four days It leaves from Baroon Pocket Dam and passes through Kondalilla National park on Day 1.

== See also ==
- Protected areas of Queensland

== Sources ==
This article incorporates text from a free content work. Licensed under CC-BY 4.0 (license statement/permission). Text taken from Kondalilla National Park - Nature, culture and history, The State of Queensland (Department of Environment and Science).
