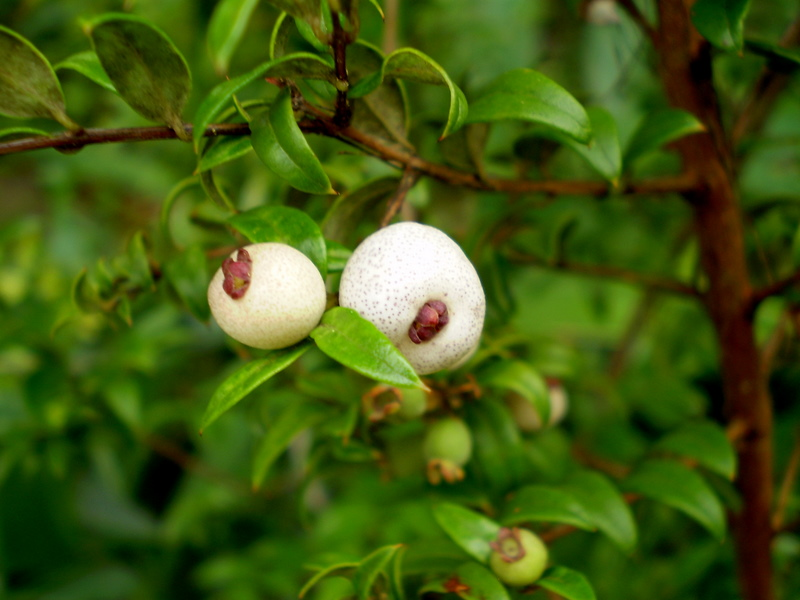
- Austromyrtus dulcis

Scientific classification
- Kingdom: Plantae
- Clade: Embryophytes
- Clade: Tracheophytes
- Clade: Angiosperms
- Clade: Eudicots
- Clade: Rosids
- Order: Myrtales
- Family: Myrtaceae
- Subfamily: Myrtoideae
- Tribe: Myrteae
- Genus: Austromyrtus (Nied.) Burret

Synonyms
- Myrtus sect. Austromyrtus Nied.

= Austromyrtus =

Genus of flowering plants in the myrtle family

Austromyrtus is a genus of shrubs in the myrtle family Myrtaceae. The genus was first described in 1893 by Franz Josef Niedenzu as a section of Myrtus, but in 1941 it was elevated to a genus by Max Burret.

Three species are found along the east coast of Australia in Queensland and New South Wales, while A. mendute is endemic to New Caledonia. The fruits of A. dulcis have a hint of cinnamon flavouring. The species under this generic name in New Caledonia are being taxonomically revised and will be transferred to another genus.

Many species formerly classified in Austromyrtus are now placed in the genera Gossia and Lenwebbia. The species formerly known as Austromyrtus lasioclada, which is common in northern New South Wales and south-eastern Queensland, is now known as Lenwebbia lasioclada. The former A. lotoides is now named Eugenia lotoides.

Four species are accepted.

- Austromyrtus dulcis (C.T.White) L.S.Sm.
- Austromyrtus glabra N.Snow & Guymer
- Austromyrtus mendute (Guillaumin) Burret
- Austromyrtus tenuifolia (Sm.) Burret
