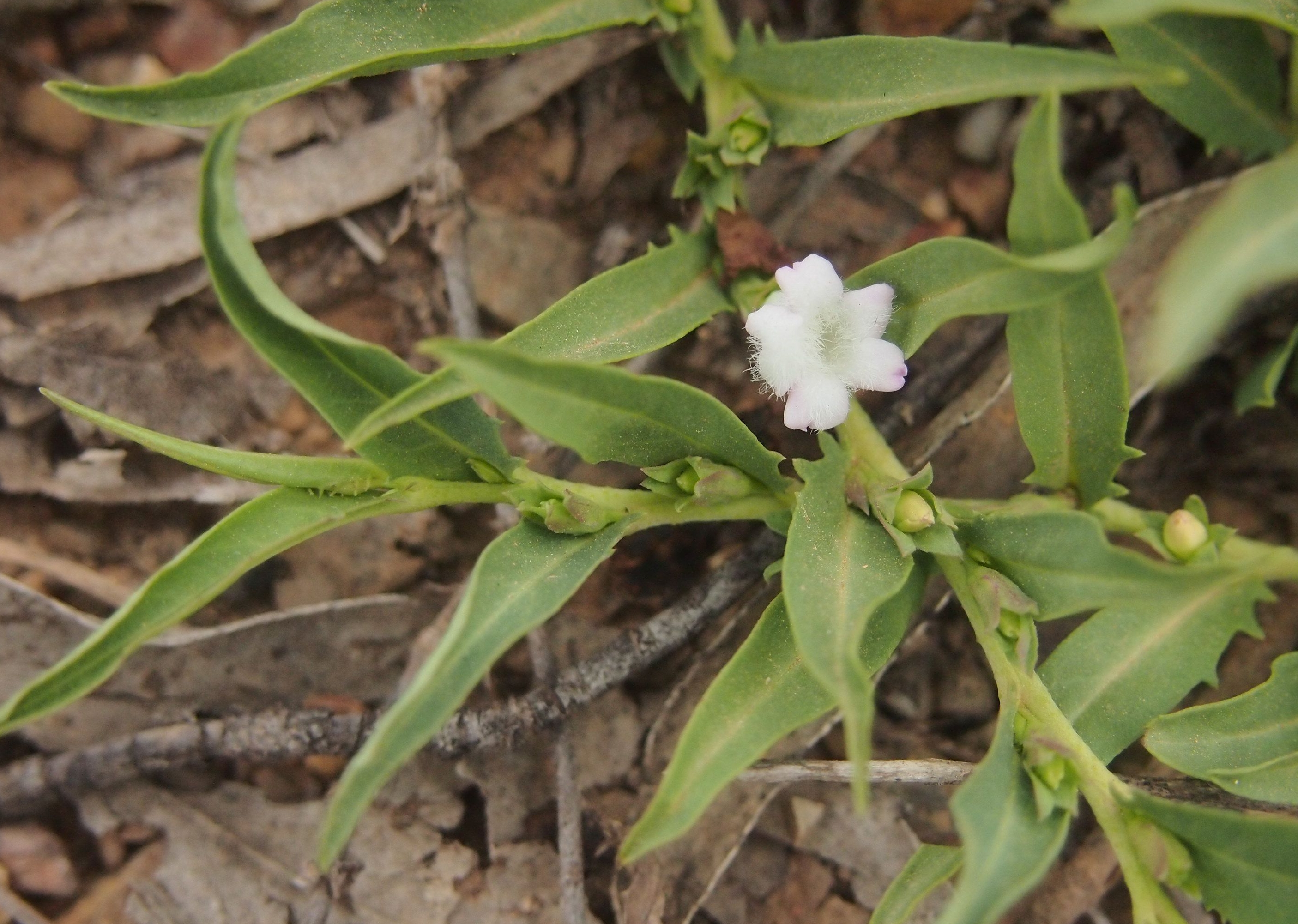

Scientific classification
- Kingdom: Plantae
- Clade: Embryophytes
- Clade: Tracheophytes
- Clade: Spermatophytes
- Clade: Angiosperms
- Clade: Eudicots
- Clade: Asterids
- Order: Lamiales
- Family: Scrophulariaceae
- Genus: Eremophila
- Species: E. debilis

Binomial name
- Eremophila debilis (Andrews) Chinnock

Synonyms
- List: Andreusia debilis (Andrews) Vent.; Capraria calycina A.Gray; Myoporum debile (Andrews) R.Br.; Myoporum diffusum R.Br.; Myoporum latisepalum Domin; Pogonia debilis Andrews

= Eremophila debilis =

Winter apple

Species of flowering plant

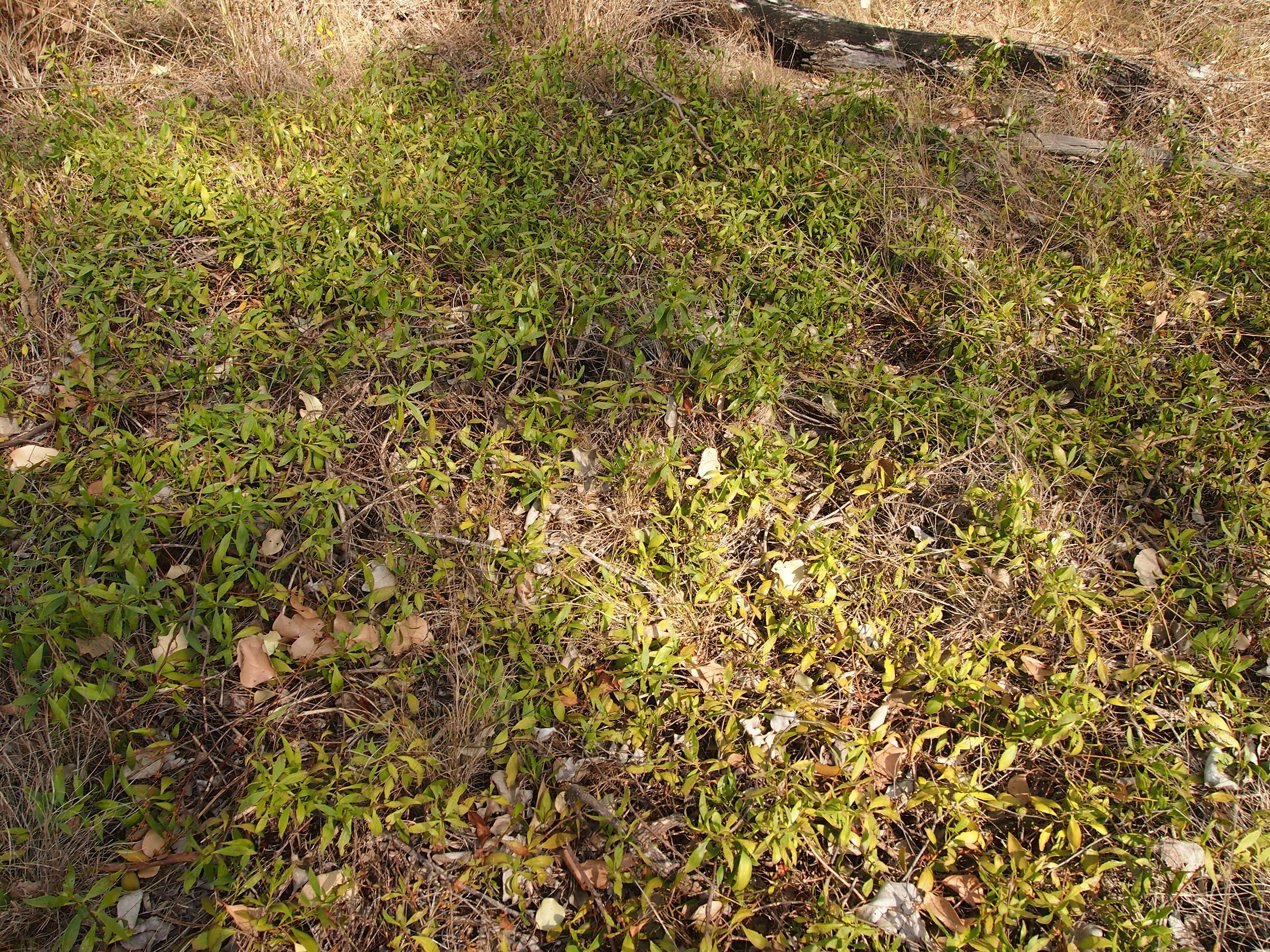
Growth habit

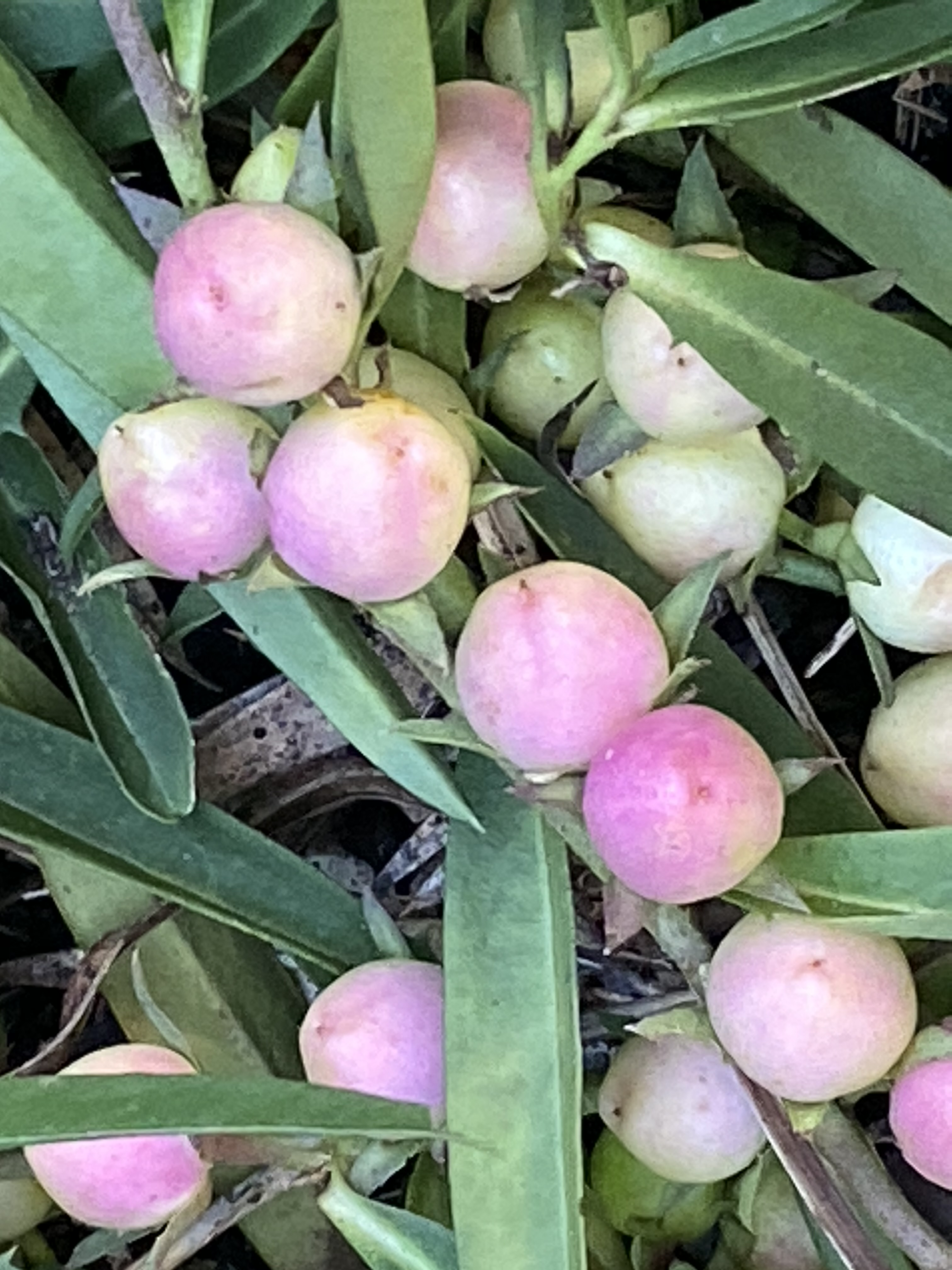
Fruit

Eremophila debilis, the winter apple or amulla, is a flowering plant in the figwort family Scrophulariaceae, and is endemic to an area extending from north Queensland to near the border between New South Wales and Victoria in Australia. It is a prostrate shrub with elliptic to lance-shaped or egg-shaped leaves and white, rarely deep mauve flowers.

== Description ==
Eremophila debilis is a prostrate shrub with spreading stems up to 1 m (3 ft) long. It has glossy green, elliptic to lance-shaped or egg-shaped leaves that are mostly 32–85 mm (1–3 in) long, 8–20 mm (0.3–0.8 in) wide and glabrous on a petiole 1–3 mm (0.039–0.118 in) long, and usually with 3 or 4 pairs of prominent teeth on the edges.

The flowers are borne singly or in groups of up to 3 in leaf axils on a stalk 3.5–7.5 mm (0.1–0.3 in) long. There are 5 green, lance-shaped, slightly overlapping sepals mostly 7–10 mm (0.3–0.4 in) long. The petals are 8.5–11 mm (0.3–0.4 in) long and joined at their lower end to form a tube. The petal tube is white to pale mauve and, unlike many others in the genus, does not have spots. The petal tube and lobes are mostly glabrous on the outside but the inside of the tube is filled with soft hairs. The 4 stamens are fully enclosed within the tube. Flowering mainly occurs in spring and summer and is followed by rounded, fleshy, white to reddish purple fruits, which are 7–10 mm (0.3–0.4 in) in diameter.

== Taxonomy and naming ==
The species was first formally described by Henry Cranke Andrews in 1802, who gave it the name Pogonia debilis. The description was published in The Botanist's Repository for New, and Rare Plants. Robert Brown changed the name to Myoporum debile in 1810 and in 1992 Robert Chinnock changed the name to Eremophila debilis. The specific epithet (debilis) is a Latin word meaning "weak" or "feeble", referring to the weak, creeping branches.

== Distribution and habitat ==
Eremophila debilis is widespread in eastern Queensland and New South Wales in a wide range of soils and vegetation associations, often in box and white cypress communities, sometimes forming dense mats. It has been recorded near Boosey in Victoria. It is also present in New Zealand, thought to be the result of naturalisation.

== Use in horticulture ==
Winter apple is well known in horticulture, although often as Myoporum debile. It is suitable as a groundcover in many areas as long as the soil is reasonably well-drained. Its flowers, fruit and foliage are attractive features. It is frost hardy and in ideal conditions will layer. Propagation from seed is difficult but is easy from hardened cuttings of the present year's growth.

== See also ==
- Austromyrtus dulcis
