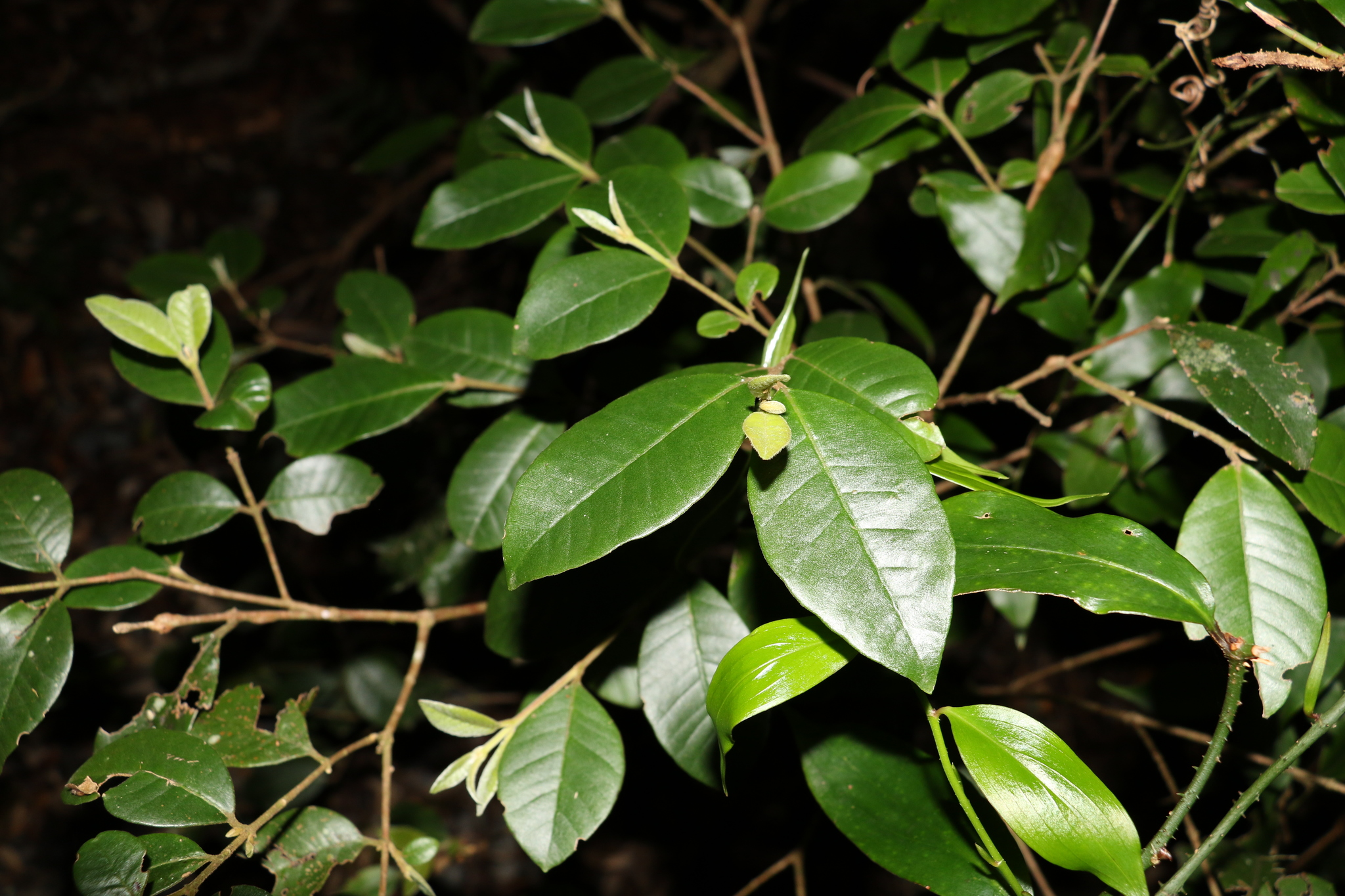
- Lenwebbia prominens

Scientific classification
- Kingdom: Plantae
- Clade: Embryophytes
- Clade: Tracheophytes
- Clade: Spermatophytes
- Clade: Angiosperms
- Clade: Eudicots
- Clade: Rosids
- Order: Myrtales
- Family: Myrtaceae
- Subfamily: Myrtoideae
- Tribe: Myrteae
- Genus: Lenwebbia; N.Snow & Guymer

Species
- Lenwebbia lasioclada; Lenwebbia prominens

= Lenwebbia =

Genus of flowering plants in the myrtle family

Lenwebbia is a genus of shrubs or small trees in the myrtle family Myrtaceae. The type species is Lenwebbia lasioclada.

The genus is named to honour the Australian plant ecologist Dr. Leonard Webb. The genus occurs in mesic forests along or near the east coast of Australia, from northern New South Wales to northeastern Queensland.

Both species in the genus were formerly classified in the genus Austromyrtus. Lenwebbia is distinct from Austromyrtus and Gossia in having four petals rather than five. Anatomical and genetic analyses have placed Lenwebbia as the sister genus to Lophomyrtus from New Zealand.

== Species ==
The following species are recognised in the genus Lenwebbia:

- Lenwebbia lasioclada – disjunct in northern New South Wales (NSW), southern and north-eastern Queensland.
- Lenwebbia prominens – found in rainforests associated with the Tweed Volcano in northern NSW and south-eastern Queensland.
