= Dalla people =

Aboriginal Australian people

The Dalla, also known as Jinibara, are an indigenous Australian people of southern Queensland whose tribal lands lay close to Brisbane.

== Language ==
The term Dalla refers to a variety of staghorn fern. The language itself was closely related to the Gubbi Gubbi language.

== Country ==
Dalla lands, estimated by Norman Tindale to encompass around 3,000 square miles (7,800 km^{2}), were centred on the hinterland ranges just north of Brisbane, such as the D'Aguilar, Glass House, Blackall and Jimna ranges west of the present-day Sunshine Coast. The territory encompassed Nanango, ran east to Nambour, Palmwoods, Durundur, including the upper Brisbane River and the headwaters of the Mary River. To their west were the Wakka Wakka people, the Gubbi Gubbi were to their north, divided from them by the Mary River. East towards the coast was the southern Undanbi clan of the Ningy Ningy who, together with the Djindubari on Bribie Island, the Dalla referred to as 'Saltwater people' (Mwoirnewar).

== Social system ==
The Dalla traditionally comprised five clans:

- (1) Dalla (alternatively called the Dalambara, Dallanbarah, Ngoera). These inhabited the headwaters of the Mary and Brisbane rivers
- (2) The Dungidau, (a language name) centred in the Kilcoy region
- (3) The Nalbo (also called Njalbo, Nalboo) inhabited the eastern foothills from Eumundi south as far as Beerwah and Caboolture.
- (4) The Dungibara (Doongibarra, Doongiburra) were on the Upper Pine River and the D'Aguilar Range.
- (5) The Garumga (also written Garumnga, Garumgma) lay west of the Brisbane River as far as Crows Nest and the Cooyar Range, with a southern limit at Esk.

== Food ==
The Dalla lived in an ecologically rich environment, flush with kangaroo, possum, bandicoot, echidnas, goanna, scrub turkey and a rich assortment of birdlife. The rivers yielded freshwater turtle, cod, eels, mussels and crayfish. The native grasses were harvested for seeds and nuts and bread was made from fern roots. Roasted and crushed river chestnuts, once soaked, were mixed with honey for cakes. Cunjevoi seeds, once leached of their toxins, were also used to make cakes that were a sidedish for eating with roasted game. Other vegetables in their diet were a waterlily with a flavour not unlike that of an artichoke, pencil orchid roots and wild yams. They had access to a native passionfruit, limes, oranges and quandong berries, eaten after they had been sweetened in sand pits. Most prized was the bunya nut which flourished in the region.

The ripeness of bunya nuts was signaled by the onset of bark loss in stands of sugar and white gums. Messages were sent to relatives and nearby tribes to meet up and feast on the harvested nuts at bush clearing set in the mountains as Baroon Pocket, a site described as a paradise in the wilderness by a German missionary who saw it, and one now flooded out by the Baroon Pocket Dam. This intertribal feasting was reciprocated by the coastal peoples who, when the Blue Mountain lorikeets showed up on the Brisbane river, who alert hinterland tribes like the Dalla that mullet (and flounder, bream and whiting) were now running in the bay, ready for fishing. The Dalla would camp on the shores of Moreton Bay and join the culling, which included huge quantities of oysters, so plentiful that they were dredged up by the ton to be burnt for lime when whites settled there.

== History of contact with whites ==
A late attempt at salvage ethnology undertaken by Lindsay Page Winterbotham who, supported and advised by Norman Tindale, conducted over several years (1950–1955) in-depth interviews with a Jinibara man, Gaiarbau (Willie Mackenzie) which resulted in a massive manuscript conserving Dalla traditions and music which, on failing to get published, he entrusted to the Queensland Museum.

- Ngoera
- Jarbu (The exonym for the Dalla (meaning 'inlanders') used by the Undanbi and other coastal tribes)
- Jinibara
- Djunggidjau

== Notable people ==
- Dundalli

== Sources ==
- Connors, Libby (2015). Warrior: A legendary leader's dramatic life and violent death on the colonial frontier. Allen & Unwin. ISBN 978-1-760-11048-2.
- Leo, Daniel (2008). "An Ark of Aboriginal Relics: Collecting Practices of Dr LP Winterbotham". In Peterson, Nicolas; Allen, Lindy; Namby, Louise (eds.). The Makers and Making of Indigenous Australian Museum Collections. Academic Monographs. pp. 76–111. ISBN 978-0-522-85568-5.
- Tindale, Norman (1974). "Dalla (QLD)". Aboriginal Tribes of Australia. Australian National University. Archived from the original on 6 March 2017.
- Winterbotham, Lindsay Page (1957). Gaiarbaus story of the Jinibara tribe of south east Queensland (and its neighbours).
