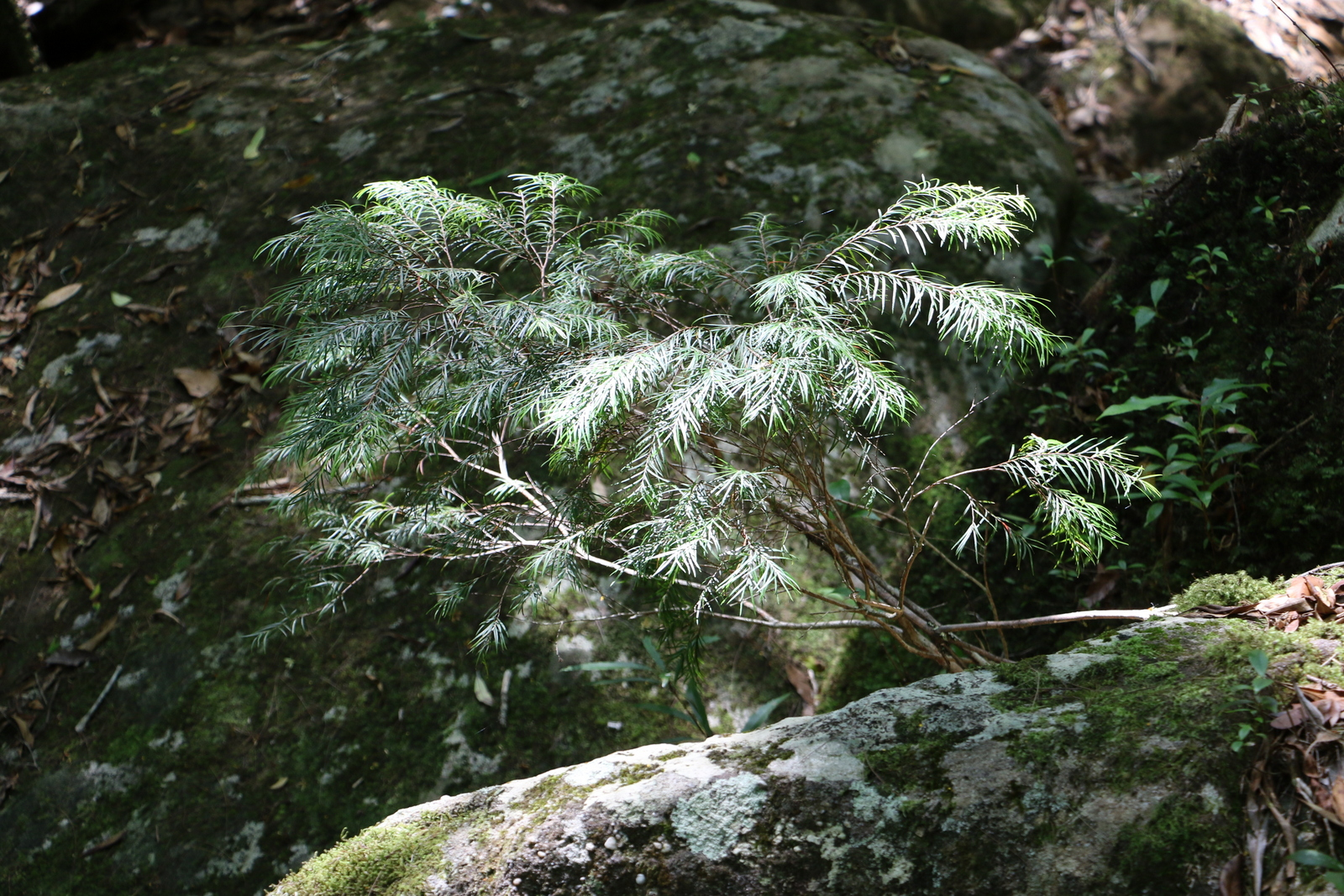
- Ku-ring-gai Chase National Park, Australia
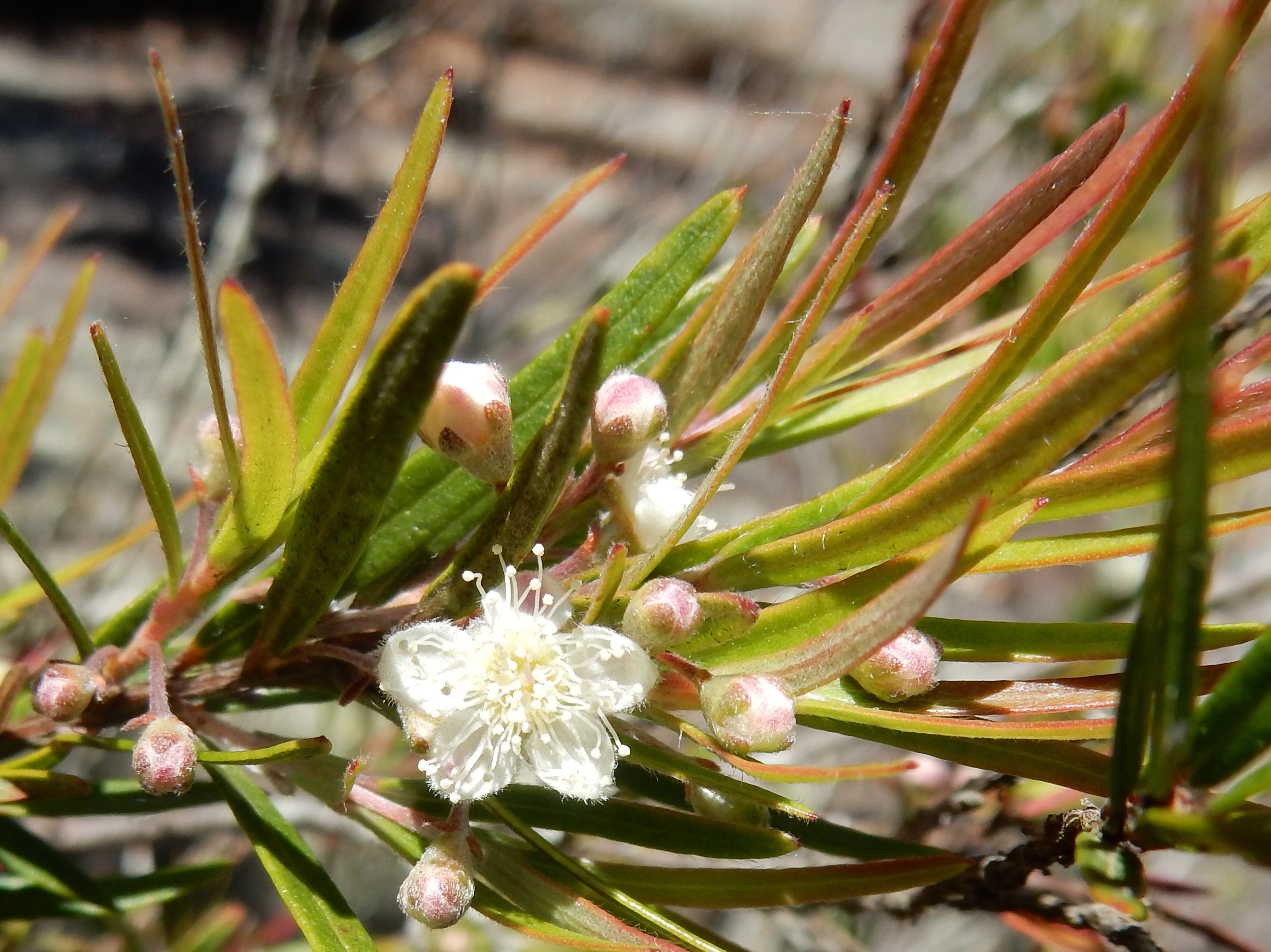

Scientific classification
- Kingdom: Plantae
- Clade: Tracheophytes
- Clade: Angiosperms
- Clade: Eudicots
- Clade: Rosids
- Order: Myrtales
- Family: Myrtaceae
- Genus: Austromyrtus
- Species: A. tenuifolia

Binomial name
- Austromyrtus tenuifolia (Sm.) Burret

Synonyms
- Myrtus tenuifolia Sm.

= Austromyrtus tenuifolia =

Narrow-leaf myrtle

Species of flowering plant

Austromyrtus tenuifolia or the narrow-leaf myrtle is a species of plant belonging to the Myrtaceae family that is native to the Sydney area in eastern Australia. The habitat that it prefers is sheltered, damp situations, often found growing near streams.

Austromyrtus tenuifolia has thin leaves; 1.5 to 4 cm long, and 1 to 3 mm wide. Flowers have 5 petals and short stalks and flower in late spring and summer. The berries are edible, dark purple when immature which then turn white with dark spots when mature. The specific epithet tenuifolia is from Latin, meaning "thin leaved". This plant first appeared in scientific literature in 1797 as Myrtus tenuifolia, published in the Transactions of the Linnean Society by the 18th century botanist James Edward Smith.
