= Eugenia lotoides =

Conservation status
- Vulnerable (IUCN 3.1)

Scientific classification
- Kingdom: Plantae
- Clade: Tracheophytes
- Clade: Angiosperms
- Clade: Eudicots
- Clade: Rosids
- Order: Myrtales
- Family: Myrtaceae
- Genus: Eugenia
- Species: E. lotoides

Binomial name
- Eugenia lotoides (Guillaumin) J.W.Dawson & N.Snow (2016)

Synonyms
- Austromyrtus lotoides (Guillaumin) Burret (1941); Myrtus lotoides Guillaumin (1938 publ. 1939)

Species of flowering plant

Eugenia lotoides is a species of flowering plant in the family Myrtaceae. It is a shrub or tree endemic to New Caledonia. It is endemic to the New Caledonia dry forests, including coastal and calcareous forests, on the western side of Grande Terre. It has a disjunct distribution, recorded at separated sites in Bourail, Nepoui, Pouembout and Kaala-Gomen from sea level to 300 metres elevation.
