= Boolarong Press =

- Parent company: Watson Ferguson & Company
- Status: Active
- Founded: 1978
- Founder: Les Padman
- Country of origin: Australia
- Headquarters location: Salisbury, Brisbane
- Distribution: Australia, New Zealand, E-book
- Key people: Dan Kelly
- Publication types: Books, E-book
- Nonfiction topics: History of Australia, Non-fiction
- Fiction genres: Children's literature, Historical fiction, Australiana, Australian Outback
- No. of employees: 10 (shared with Watson Ferguson & Company)
- Official website: www.boolarongpress.com.au

Boolarong Press is a family-owned book publishing company located in Brisbane. Established in 1976 by Les Padman, the business was purchased in 1995 by Watson Ferguson & Company. Boolarong has published Queensland's historical literary works and aims to promote and publish local authors.

With a focus on historic literature and Australian themed children's books, Boolarong Press has published titles including Tom Hurstbourne or A Squatter's Life, the first book to be written, published and printed in Queensland. Originally written in 1865, Tom Hurstbourne was not published until 2010 after the original hand written manuscript was re-discovered by the great-great-grandson of the author.

The top-selling book published by Boolarong Press is Noel Whittaker's Making Money Made Simple which sold over 325,000 copies.

Successful children's stories published by Boolarong Press include the Outback Series by Norah Kersh; a series of educational books based around everyday experiences of children growing up in the outback, and the Cassowary series by Pam Galeano which details in fine art the lives of some of Queensland's most endangered species.

Books published in 2022 are:

I'm a Nipper Now by Sally Cordner illustrated by Lucy Simms
