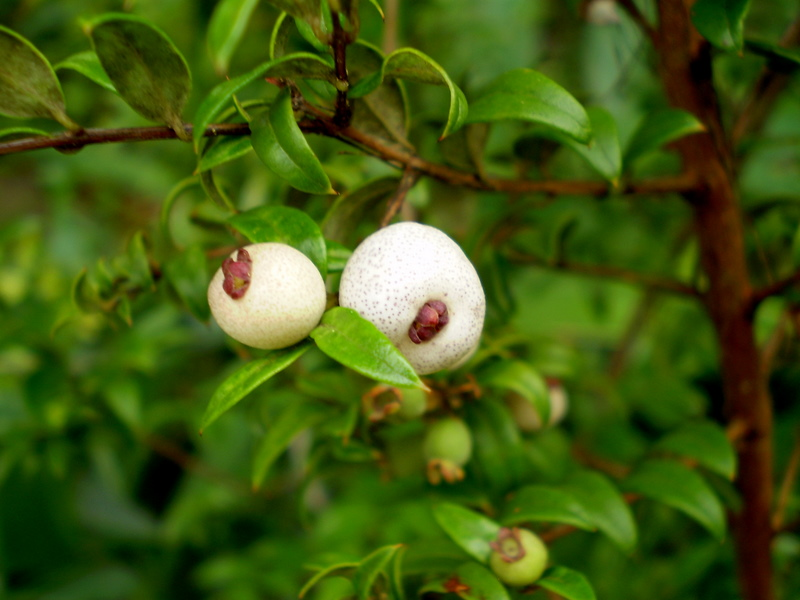

Scientific classification
- Kingdom: Plantae
- Clade: Tracheophytes
- Clade: Angiosperms
- Clade: Eudicots
- Clade: Rosids
- Order: Myrtales
- Family: Myrtaceae
- Genus: Austromyrtus
- Species: A. dulcis

Binomial name
- Austromyrtus dulcis (C.T.White) L.S.Sm.
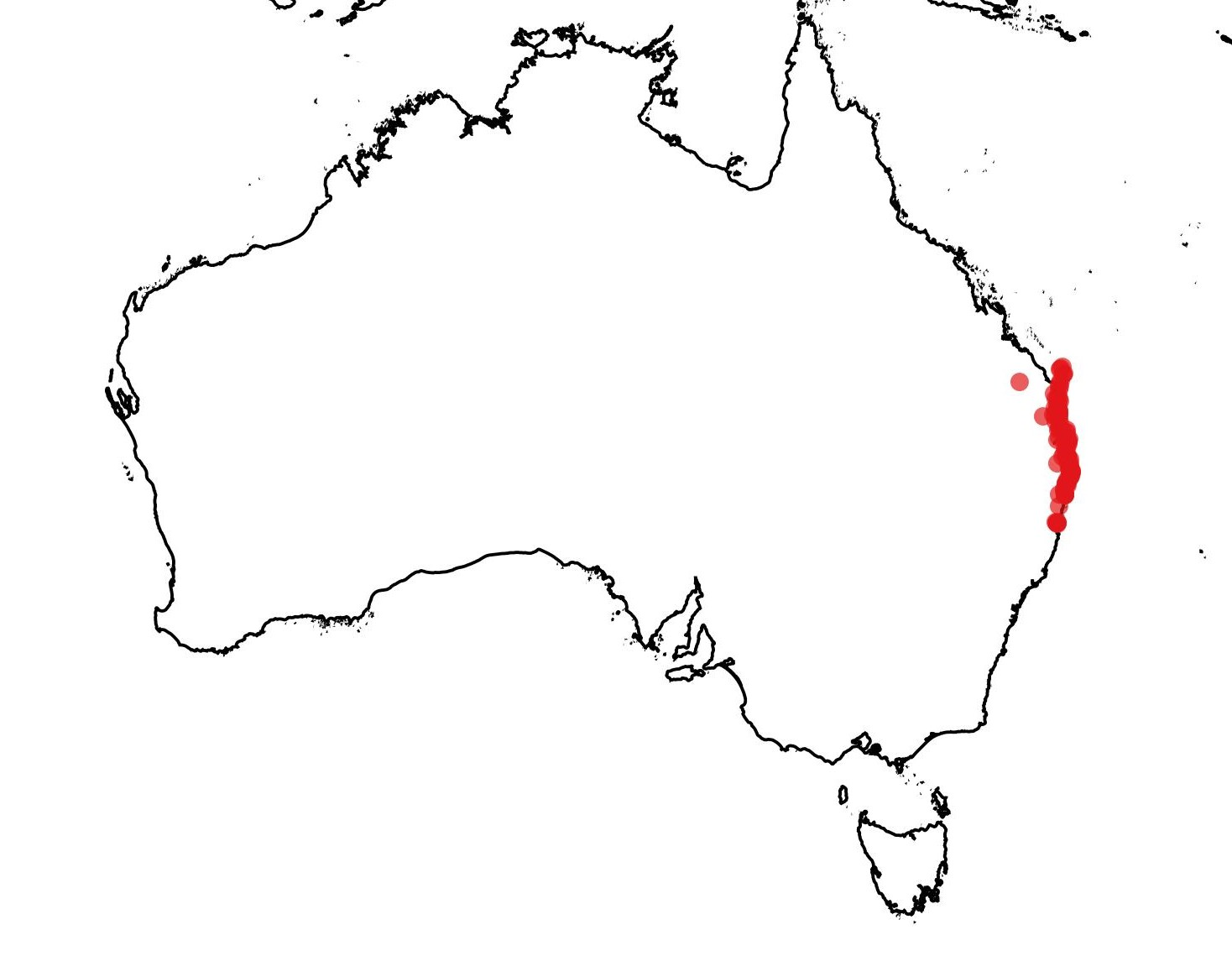
- Occurrence data from the AVH

Synonyms
- Myrtus dulcis C.T.White

= Austromyrtus dulcis =

Midgen berry

Species of shrub

Austromyrtus dulcis is a species of plant native to eastern Australia. It grows as a small spreading shrub and is easily recognised by its characteristic berries that usually ripen in summer and autumn. Common names include the midgen berry, midyim, and silky myrtle.

== Description ==
Austromyrtus dulcis is a small spreading shrub; 1 to 2 m (3 ft 3 in to 6 ft 7 in) in height. The leaves are 1–3 cm long and 0.5 cm wide, opposite, lanceolate to elliptical, glossy above with silky hairs beneath. The small white flowers are 7-10 mm in length, they have five petals and a large number of sepals, they are then followed by dotted mauve sweet edible berries which ripen in summer and autumn and contain three to nine pale brown seeds.

== Distribution and habitat ==
The species occurs in New South Wales and Queensland, from Grafton to Fraser Island. It occurs as a common understorey plant of heathland and woodlands and also growing on sandy soils and occasionally on the margins of rainforests.

== Uses ==
The berries are a popular traditional bushfood, eaten by indigenous Australians and non-indigenous people. The melt-in-the-mouth berries are sweet and aromatic, with a pleasant peppery/gingery flavour. While recognized as having good flavour qualities, the berries have not been commercialized due to harvesting and handling issues.

Midgim is also popular in amenity horticulture as an adaptable shrub for a variety of situations, handling a range of soils and climatic conditions.

It springs up and grows like a wheat field .... one can go through acres of the scrub with its white, sweet-tasting berry until stopped by a lagoon or salt water. It is the most sought-for berry or fruit on the island. Children will collect it by the tin-full, and even the elders will join with gusto in its eating.

— Thomas Welsby's description of the plant in relation with the native peoples on Fraser Island., Wild Food Plants of Australia p. 35

== See also ==
- Ugni molinae
- Syzygium australe
- Eremophila debilis
- Billardiera scandens
- Enchylaena tomentosa
- Solanum aviculare
- Backhousia citriodora
- Smilax glyciphylla
