= Thomas Petrie =

Queensland pioneer (1831–1910)

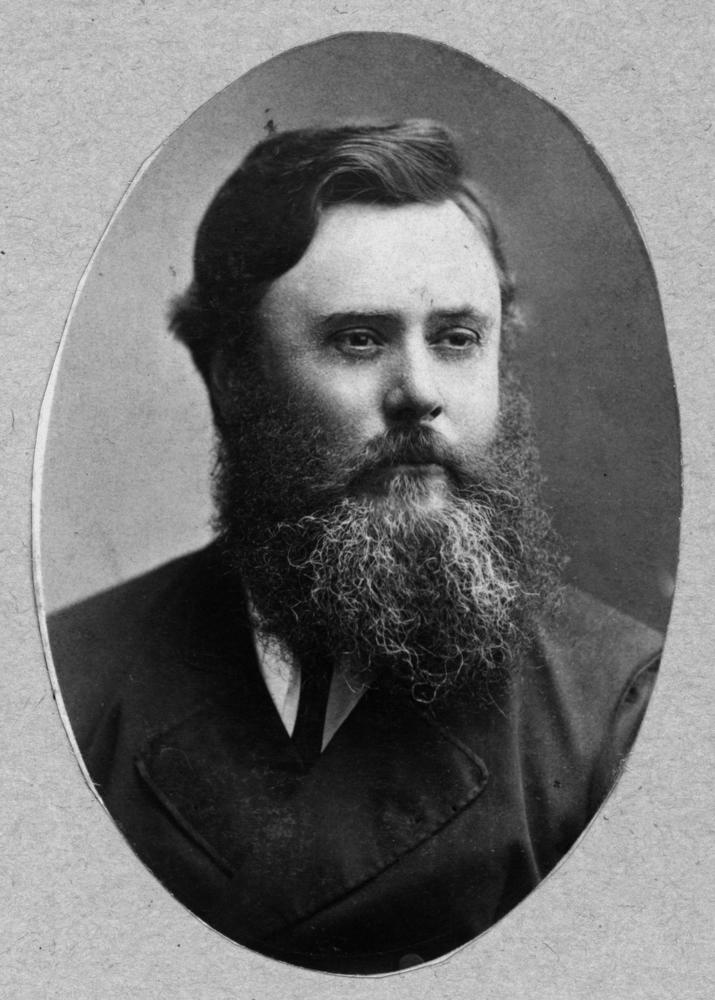
- Portrait
- Born: 31 January 1831; Edinburgh, Scotland
- Died: 26 August 1910 (aged 79); Pine Rivers Shire
- Occupations: Grazier, explorer
- Children: 9 Constance Campbell Petrie
- Parent(s): Andrew Petrie, Mary Cuthbertson
- Relatives: John Petrie

Thomas Petrie (31 January 1831 – 26 August 1910) was an Australian explorer, gold prospector, logger, and grazier. He was a Queensland pioneer.

== Early life ==
Petrie was born at Edinburgh, fourth son of Andrew Petrie and brother of John. His family travelled to Sydney, arriving in October 1831 and his father entered the government service as a supervisor of building.

They moved to the Moreton Bay penal colony (subsequently Brisbane) in 1837, where Thomas was educated by a convict clerk and allowed to mix freely with Aboriginal children. He learnt to speak the local language, Turrbal and was encouraged to share in all Aboriginal activities. He was witness to convicts labouring in chains on the government farms along the river and saw numerous floggings of convicts on Queen Street. Petrie was also in the crowd that watched the first hangings at the settlement in 1841, that of the Aboriginal men Nungavil and Mullan at The Old Windmill. At 14 he participated in a walkabout to a feast in the Bunya Mountains, chaperoned by Dalaipi. He was accepted by the Aboriginal people and was often used as a messenger and invited on exploration expeditions. He also learned about surveying, bushcraft and the local geography while travelling with his father.

== Career ==
In 1851 Petrie prospected for gold in the Turon region of New South Wales and spent the next five years on Victorian goldfields also known as 'finding only enough gold to make a ring!' since it was their motto. He returned to Brisbane a number of times and saw the botched public hanging of Dalla man Dundalli on 5 January 1855 "where now the Post Office stands". Petrie married Elizabeth Campbell in 1859 and shortly after the marriage, Petrie sought the advice of a local Aboriginal elder named Dalaipi for a good place to start a cattle station. Dalaipi's son, Dal-ngang showed him their ancestral land at Mandin (North Pine River) and offered it to Petrie. Dal-ngang expressed indignation when told this land had already been acquired by the Griffens as part of the Whiteside station. Petrie, after consulting with Mrs Griffen bought a ten square mile (26 km^{2}) section of the property in the Pine Creek district and named it Murrumba, an Aboriginal word meaning "good place" (possibly Turrbal or Yugarabul based on location). Aboriginal people helped him to clear his land and build his farm buildings.

On 26 June 1861, Thomas Petrie appeared at the proceedings of the Select Committee on the Native Police Force to give evidence. Petrie testified that 'nearly all [the old Brisbane tribes (sic) were] dead now' due to 'drink' being illegally supplied to them by Brisbane 'whites'. He testified Aboriginal people were 'useful' employees, and 'the bad conduct of the blacks (sic) [was] in great measure the fault of the white people themselves, and the way in which they treat them. [He had] been living where no one else was able to remain, and [he] had several hundred blacks (sic) about [him]'. Due to his unique experiences and relationship with Indigenous people of the area, Petrie's testimony was nuanced, provided insight into Aboriginal practices and culture, and countered negative myths or rumours about Aboriginal people.

Petrie continued to look for new timber and places suitable for European settlement. In 1862, he headed to the Maroochy River area with a group of 25 Aboriginal people that included Ker-Walli, Wanangga and Billy Dingy. On this journey, he became the first white man to climb Buderim Mountain and also ventured up the tributaries of the Maroochy River looking to exploit the large cedar growing there. At Petrie's Creek, he established a logging camp which was run by Aboriginal labour. At this camp, the Aboriginal workers requested that Petrie brand them with his logging symbol. This was done by using a piece of glass and then rubbing charcoal into the wound. He later surveyed a route from Cleveland to Eight Mile Plains. He also arranged for some Aboriginal people to welcome the Duke of Edinburgh in 1868. In 1877 the Douglas ministry established Queensland's first Aboriginal reserve on Bribie Island with Petrie as its chief adviser and overseer, but the reserve was closed in 1878 by colonial secretary Palmer.

== Later life ==
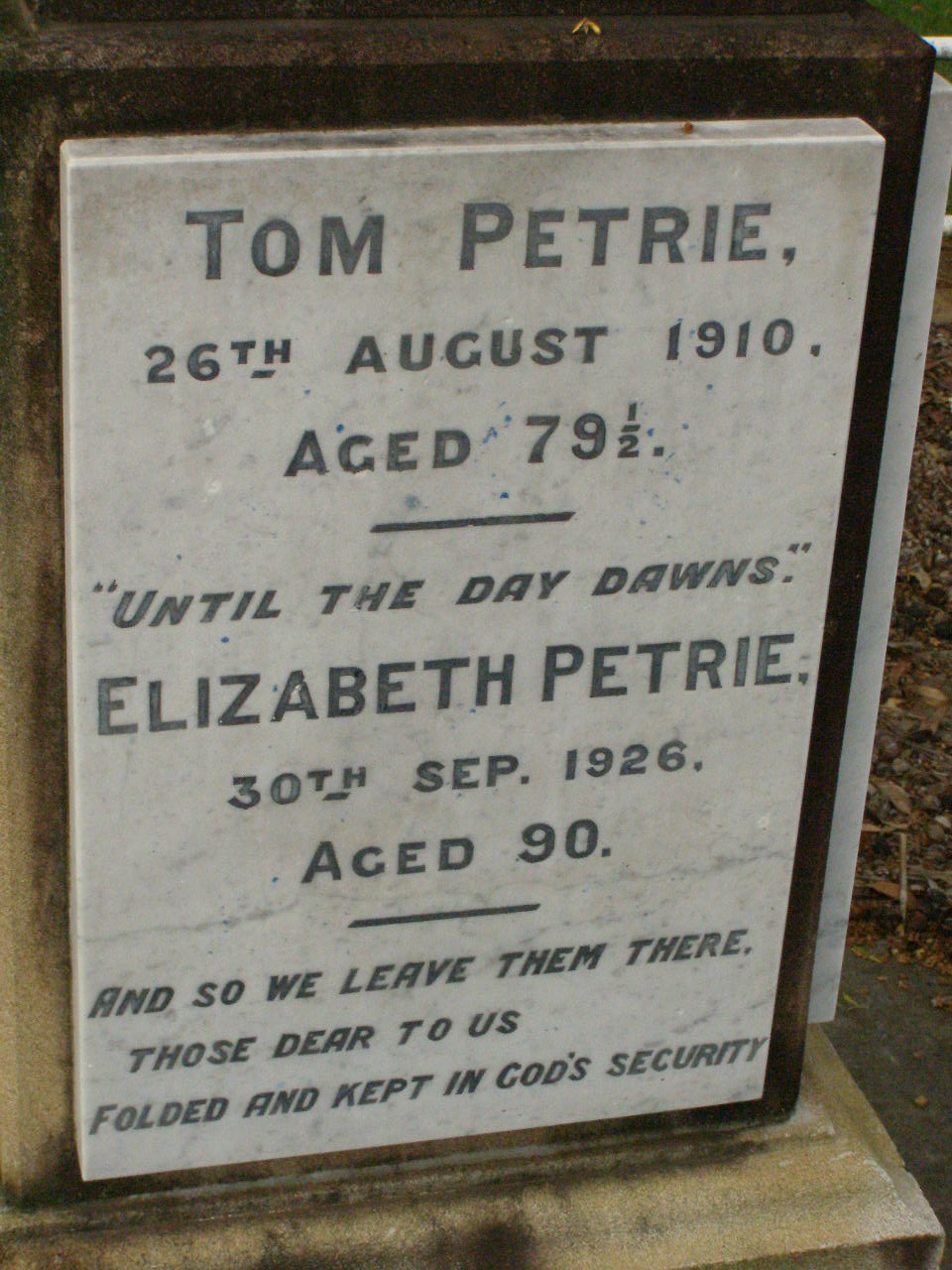
Thomas Petrie headstone in Lawnton cemetery, 2007

Petrie died at Murrumba on 26 August 1910. He was buried in Lawnton Cemetery. He was survived by his wife (who died aged 90 on 30 September 1926) and by two sons and five daughters of their nine children. Though Murrumba had been reduced to 3000 acres (12 km^{2}) the family kept the property until 1952. In 1910 the name of the North Pine district was changed to Petrie in his honour.

== Legacy ==
In 1904 Tom Petrie's Reminiscences of Early Queensland was published, written by his daughter, Constance Campbell Petrie. The book is regarded as one of the best authorities on Brisbane's early days.

In 1910 the name of the North Pine district was changed to Petrie in his honour.

On Saturday 15 July 1911, a freestone monument to Thomas Petrie was unveiled by Sir William MacGregor, the Queensland Governor. It is outside the North Pine School of Arts in Petrie Place Park, 1014–1030 Anzac Avenue, Petrie (27.2694°S 152.9786°E).

On 19 June 2009, a new suburb in the area was named Murrumba Downs after Tom Petrie's property.

== See also ==
- Murrumba Homestead Grounds, the heritage-listed remains of Thomas Petrie's homestead
- Petrie, Queensland
- Gilburri - Escaped convict adopted by Aboriginals. Mentioned in Petrie's book.
