= Baroon Pocket Dam =

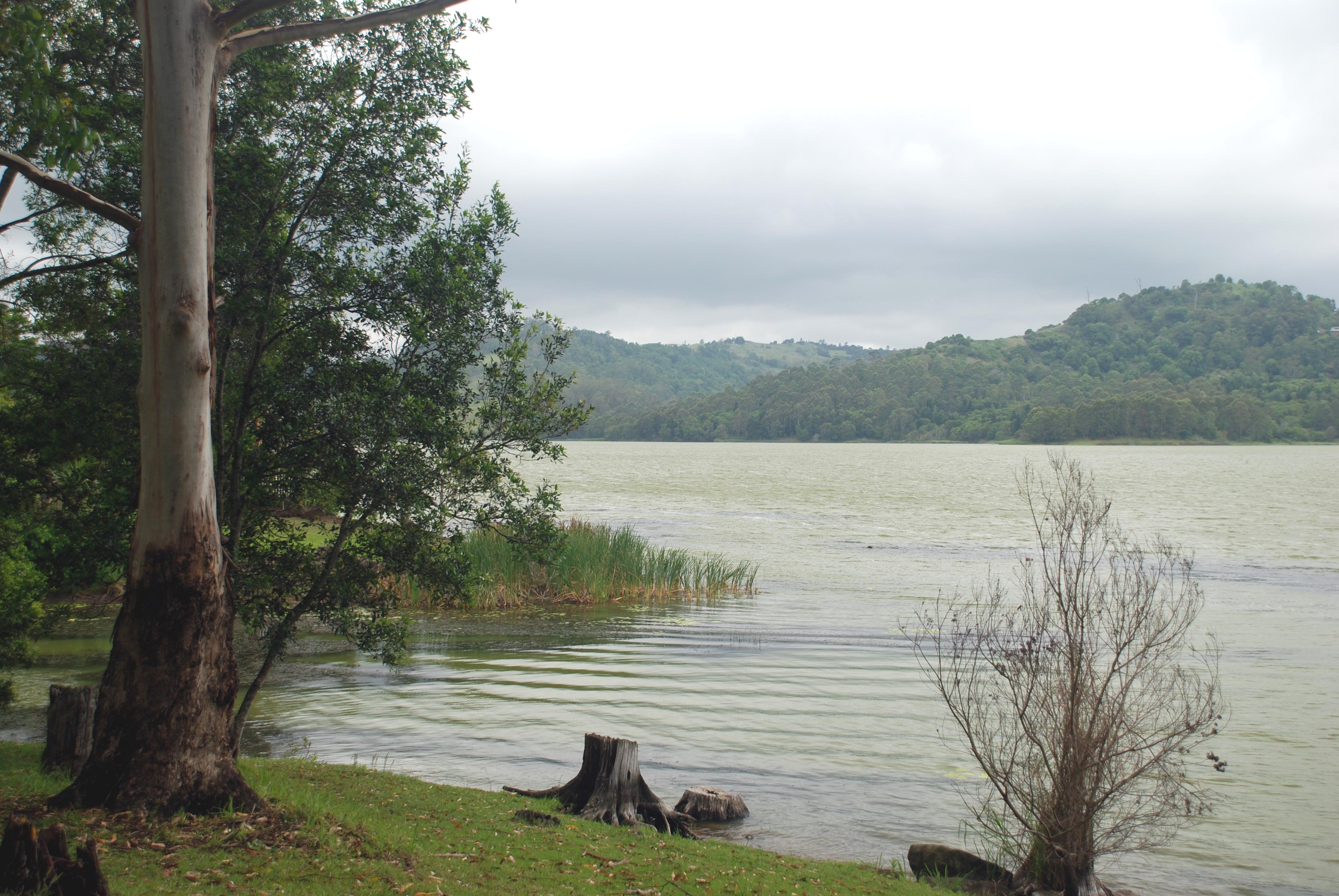
- Lake and shoreline, 2008

- Location of the dam in Queensland
- Interactive map of Baroon Pocket Dam
- Country: Australia
- Location: South East Queensland
- Coordinates: 26°42′12″S 152°52′5″E
- Purpose: Water supply
- Status: Operational
- Opening date: 1989
- Operator: SEQ Water

Dam and spillways
- Type of dam: Embankment dam
- Impounds: Obi Obi Creek
- Height: 58 m (190 ft)
- Length: 370 m (1,210 ft)
- Dam volume: 716×10^{3} m^{3} (25.3×10^{6} cu ft)
- Spillway type: Uncontrolled
- Spillway capacity: 1,013 m^{3}/s (35,800 cu ft/s)

Reservoir
- Creates: Lake Baroon
- Total capacity: 61,000 ML (2,200×10^{6} cu ft)
- Catchment area: 72 km^{2} (28 sq mi)
- Surface area: 380 ha (940 acres)
- Maximum length: 3.9 km (2.4 mi)
- Maximum width: 1.9 km (1.2 mi)
- Maximum water depth: 15 m (49 ft)
- Normal elevation: 215 m (705 ft) AHD
- Website www.seqwater.com.au

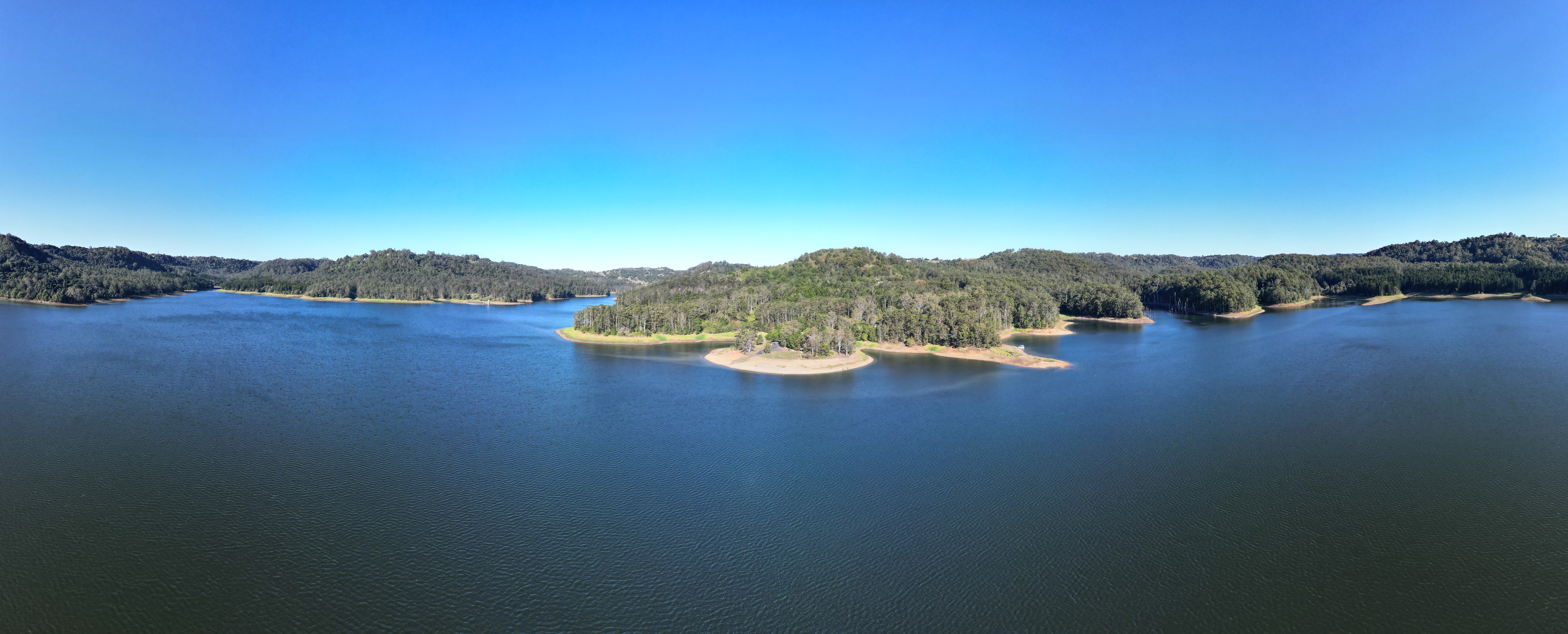
Aerial panorama of Lake Baroon. June 2023.

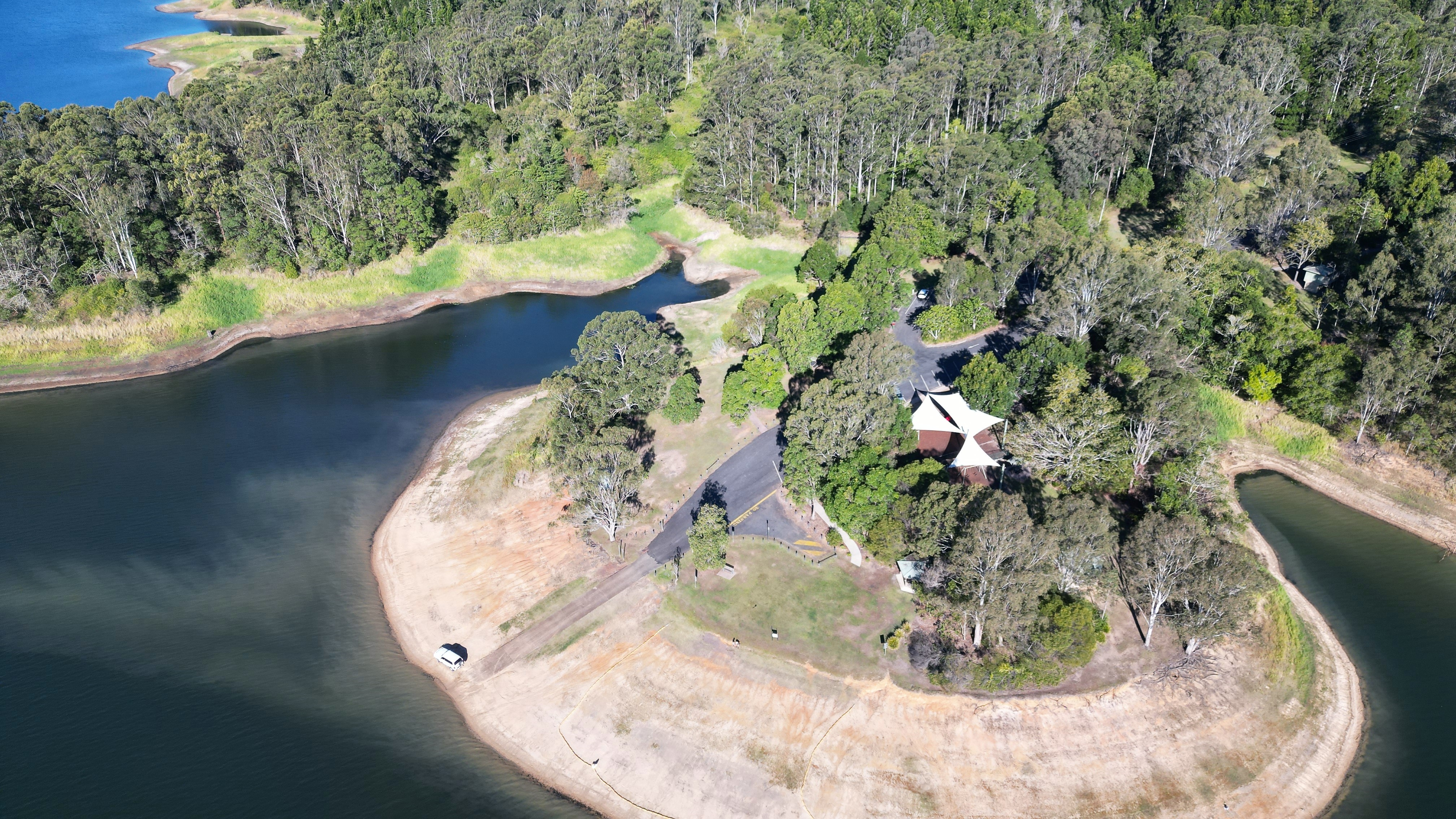
Lake Baroon top down. June 2023

The Baroon Pocket Dam is a rock and earth-fill embankment dam with an ungated spillway across the Obi Obi Creek, in North Maleny, Sunshine Coast Region, in South East Queensland, Australia. The main purpose of the dam is for potable water supply. The impounded reservoir is called Lake Baroon.

Just below the dam is Obi Obi Gorge, one of the few remaining places left where the Mary River cod maintains a wild population. After its initial filling, the dam reached its lowest level between December 2002 and February 2003 at 50% capacity.

== History ==
The name Baroon is derived from the Aboriginal name for the area, which was traditionally used as a meeting place and ceremonial ground. Explorer Ludwig Leichhardt referred to the area as "Booroon" in 1843, and Thomas Petrie later described attending a large Bunya festival there in 1845, which attended hundreds of Aboriginal people from across the region. The name was first recorded by European colonists in 1842.

A potential dam site at Baroon Pocket on Obi Obi Creek was surveyed in 1946 as a possible regional water source. However, disagreement between the Landsborough and Maroochy Shires over water infrastructure delayed development for several decades. A joint water supply scheme was eventually approved in 1985, and construction of Baroon Pocket Dam commenced shortly after.

The dam was completed in November 1988 and reached full capacity by April 1989 following significant rainfall. It was officially opened in 1989 and has since played a central role in supplying potable water to the Sunshine Coast region.

== Location and features ==
Located 7 kilometres (4.3 mi) north of Maleny in the Sunshine Coast region, the dam wall was completed in 1989 over the Obi Obi Creek, Small Creek and several unnamed watercourses.

The dam wall is 58 metres (190 ft) high and 370 metres (1,210 ft) long and holds back 61,000 megalitres (13×10^{9} imp gal; 16×10^{9} US gal) of water when at full capacity. The surface area of the reservoir is 380 hectares (940 acres) and the catchment area is 72 square kilometres (28 sq mi). The uncontrolled un-gated spillway has a discharge capacity of 1,013 cubic metres per second (35,800 cu ft/s).

Baroon Pocket Dam's primary use is for town water supply for Maroochy and Caloundra. An intake tower allows water to flow from the dam through a 2.5-metre (8.2 ft) wide, 2.5-kilometre (1.6 mi) long tunnel under the Blackall Range. Water is then distributed by UnityWater for a range of purposes. The dam and catchment is managed by Seqwater.

== Recreational use and environmental management ==
=== Boating ===
There is a single boat ramp. Camping is not permitted near the lake. There are picnic areas by the lakeside while viewing platforms and a rainforest walking track through Obi Obi Gorge, are located near the spillway. Fossil fuel motors are not allowed on the lake. A council permit, obtainable on site, is required to use an electric outboard motor for the use on dinghies, but not on canoes.

=== Fishing ===
Lake Baroon is stocked with bass, Mary River cod, golden perch and silver perch, while eel-tailed catfish and spangled perch are naturally present. A council permit is required to fish in the dam.

=== Environmental management ===
Catchment care activities are undertaken by Lake Baroon Catchment Care Group (LBCCG) a community group predominantly funded by SeqWater ($220,000 PA in 2015). The group coordinates protection and remedial works in the catchment and addresses ways to improve water quality. Since its inception in 1992, LBCCG has developed and monitored over $3.5 million of water quality improvement projects, mainly working with local primary producers.

=== Walking ===
The rugged Sunshine Coast Hinterland Great Walk takes at least four days to complete. It leaves from Baroon Pocket Dam and traverses 58.8 kilometres (36.5 mi) through the Blackall Range. Baroon lookout, which provides views of Obi Obi Gorge, Baroon Pocket Dam and its catchment, is 2.2 kilometres (1.4 mi) along the walk.

== See also ==
- List of dams and reservoirs in Australia
- List of long-distance hiking tracks in Australia
