= Constance Campbell Petrie =

Australian writer

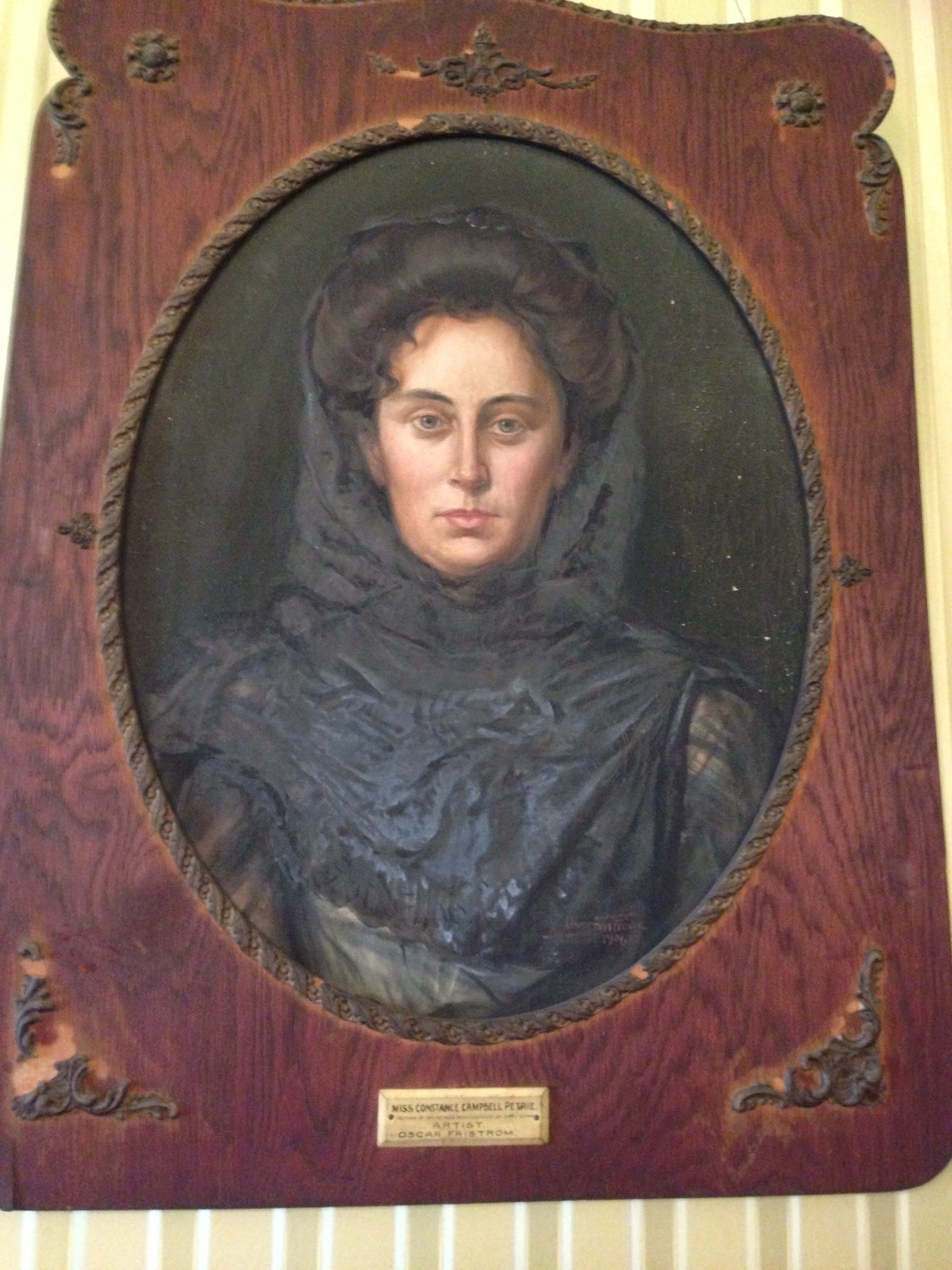
Constance Campbell Petrie (painting hanging in Newstead House)

Constance Campbell Petrie (1873 – 4 July 1926), writer, was born in Queensland in 1873, youngest daughter of Thomas Petrie and his wife, Elizabeth, née Campbell.

In 1904 Tom Petrie's Reminiscences of Early Queensland was published, written by Constance in collaboration with her father, Thomas. The book is regarded as one of the best authorities on Brisbane's early days. In the book Constance managed to retain her father's pleasant conversational style and the book contains much valuable aboriginal folk lore and information.

In 1918 Constance married George Philip Stuart, some time manager of the Brisbane Branch of the Union Bank of Australia.

Constance died on 4 July 1926 and was buried in the Toowong Cemetery. She had been an invalid for some years prior to her death. At the time of her death she was living in Clayfield, Queensland, a suburb of Brisbane. Her husband, George, survived her. Her mother, Elizabeth, also survived her, to die later in the same year.
