= City of Caloundra =

Coordinates: 26°48′15.34″S 153°07′28.12″E

- Local government area
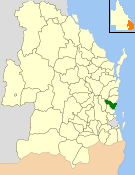
- Location within Queensland

- Country: Australia
- State: Queensland
- Region: Sunshine Coast
- Established: 1912
- Council seat: Caloundra

Area
  - Total: 1,093.1 km^{2} (422.0 sq mi)

Population
  - Total: 90,341 (2006 census)
  - Density: 82.647/km^{2} (214.054/sq mi)
- Website: City of Caloundra
LGAs around City of Caloundra
Maroochy	Maroochy	Pacific Ocean
Kilcoy	City of Caloundra	Pacific Ocean
Caboolture	Caboolture	Pacific Ocean

The City of Caloundra was a local government area about 90 kilometres (56 mi) north of Brisbane in the Sunshine Coast region of South East Queensland, Australia. The shire covered an area of 1,093.1 square kilometres (422.0 sq mi); it existed as a local government entity from 1912 until 2008, when it amalgamated with councils further north to form the Sunshine Coast Region.

The City covered the urban localities of Caloundra and Kawana Waters and surrounding suburbs, the northern half of Bribie Island and the western hinterland towns of Landsborough, Maleny and Witta.

== History ==
In 1868, the Queensland Government opened up large areas of land for settlement in the Caloundra area which became home to pioneers and timber cutters seeking red cedar wood.

The area was originally incorporated as part of the Caboolture Division on 11 November 1879 under the Divisional Boards Act 1879. With the passage of the Local Authorities Act 1902, Caboolture Division became Shire of Caboolture on 31 March 1903.

On 22 February 1912, part of the Shire of Caboolture was split away and was proclaimed as the Shire of Landsborough. John Tytherleigh, a local businessman with stores in the area, was elected its first chairman and they quickly set to work building the (now heritage-listed) Landsborough Shire Council Chambers in Landsborough. It was reconstructed from local timbers under the guidance of architect Walter Voller in 1924, and the building is today used as a museum housing artefacts including former Premier Frank Nicklin's personal collection.

The first female councillor was Miriam Westaway (née Costello) who represented Division 5 from 29 April 1961 to 30 March 1973. She was one of the first teachers at Caloundra State School. She was active in community groups such as the RSL Women's Auxiliary and a founder of the Caloundra Branch of the Queensland Country Women's Association and the local branch of the Red Cross.

On 19 December 1987, the Shire of Landsborough was granted city status, and was renamed the City of Caloundra, reflecting the population boom in the coastal section of the City. The Council Chambers were relocated to Omrah Avenue, Caloundra, and Jack Beausang, the long-serving Chairman of the Shire of Landsborough, was sworn in as its first mayor. He retired undefeated on 17 March 1988, and Don Aldous was elected to replace him.

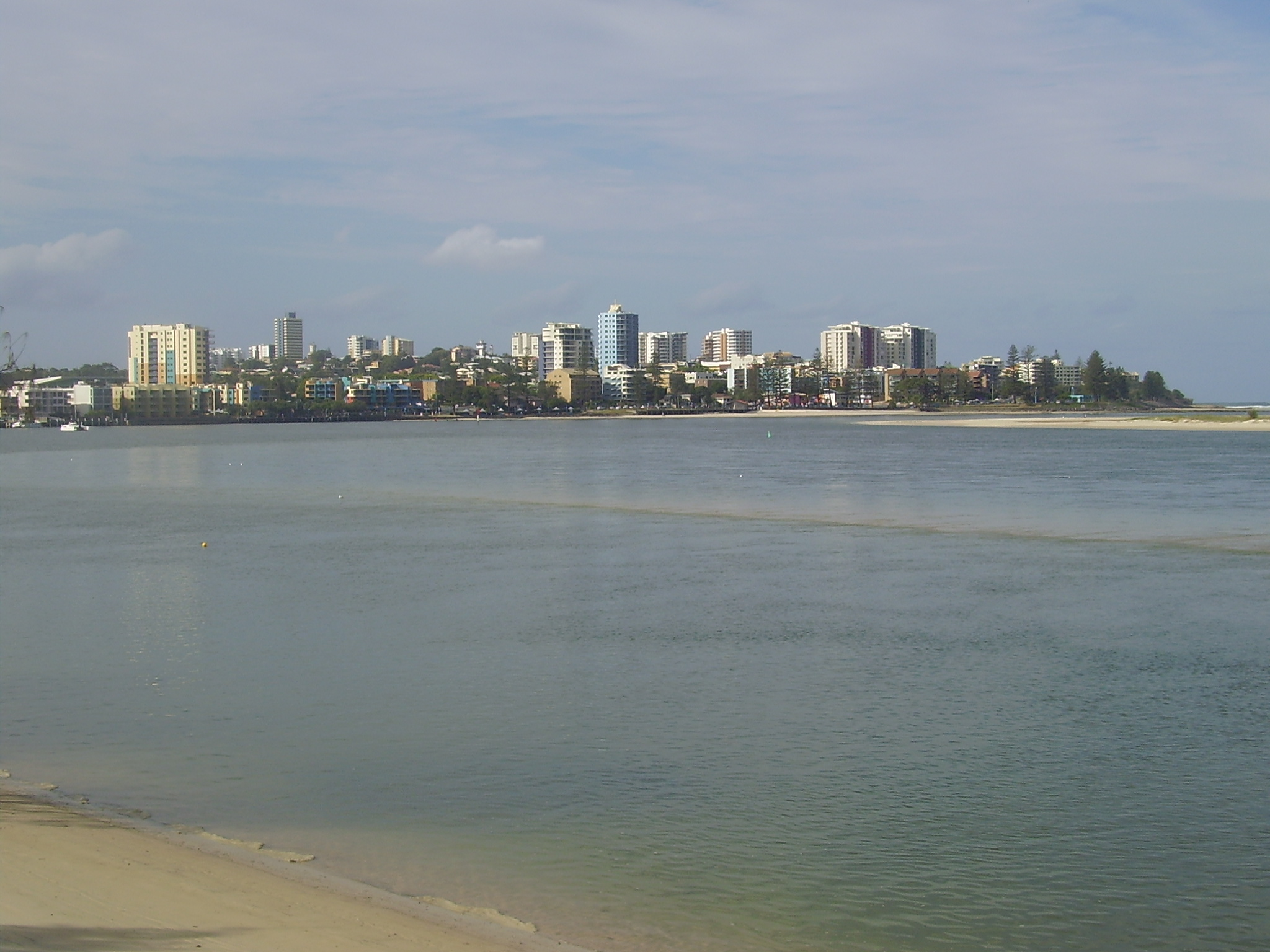
Caloundra, Sunshine Coast

On 15 March 2008, under the Local Government (Reform Implementation) Act 2007 passed by the Parliament of Queensland on 10 August 2007, the City of Caloundra merged with the Shire of Noosa and the Shire of Maroochy to form the Sunshine Coast Region. However, in 2014, Shire of Noosa was re-established as independent of the Sunshine Coast Region.

== Structure ==
The Shire was subdivided into ten numbered divisions, each of which returned one councillor, and an elected mayor.

== Towns and localities ==
The City of Caloundra included the following settlements:

- Aroona
- Bald Knob
- Balmoral Ridge
- Battery Hill
- Beerburrum
- Beerwah
- Bells Creek
- Birtinya
- Bokarina
- Booroobin
- Bribie Island North
- Buddina
- Caloundra
- Caloundra West
- Cambroon
- Conondale
- Coochin Creek
- Crohamhurst
- Curramore
- Currimundi
- Diamond Valley
- Dicky Beach
- Elaman Creek
- Glass House Mountains
- Glenview
- Golden Beach
- Harper Creek
- Kidaman Creek^{1}
- Kings Beach
- Landsborough
- Little Mountain
- Maleny
- Meridan Plains
- Minyama
- Moffat Beach
- Mooloolah Valley
- Mount Mellum
- North Maleny
- Palmview
- Parrearra
- Peachester
- Pelican Waters
- Reesville
- Shelly Beach
- Warana
- Witta
- Wootha
- Wurtulla

^{1} - split with the Shire of Maroochy

== Population ==
Year	Population-
1933	4,752
1947	6,460
1954	7,765
1961	8,319
1966	8,798
1971	11,314
1976	16,982
1981	29,705
1986	36,486
1991	53,434
1996	66,336
2001	75,261
2006	90,341

== Chairmen and mayors ==
- 1921–1924: John H. Tytherleigh
- 1924–1933: J. Grigor
- 1933–1949: H. M. Bray
- 1949–1955: A. Fleming
- 1955–1958: Duncan MacDonald
- 1958–1961: H. W. Anning
- 1961–1964: Duncan MacDonald
- 1964–1988: Jack Beausang
- 1988–1991: Don C. Aldous
- 1991–1994: Barry Gray
- 1994–2000: Des J. Dwyer
- 2000–2008: Don C. Aldous

== See also ==
- Caloundra bus station
