= Fairview, Maleny =

Fairview
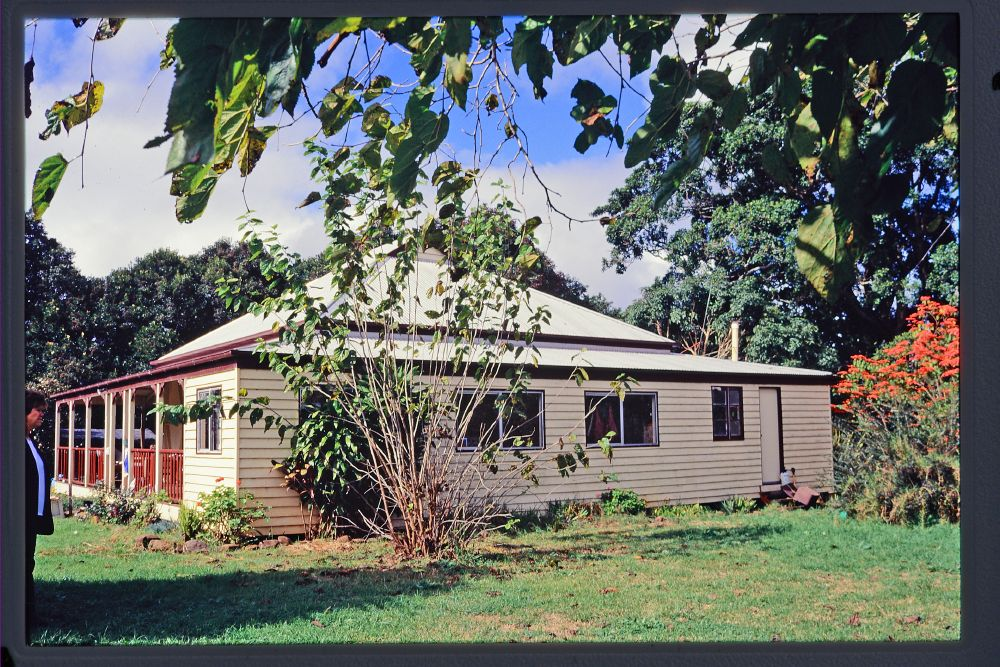
- South-west corner of Fairview, 2003

- Location within Queensland Location within Australia
- 26.7586°S 152.864°E
- Location: 15 Porter's Lane, Maleny, Sunshine Coast Region, Queensland, Australia

History
- Design period: 1900–1914 (early 20th century)
- Built: 1907

Queensland Heritage Register
- Official name: Fairview, Armstrong's House, Pattemore House
- Type: state heritage (built)
- Designated: 4 September 2003
- Reference no.: 602105
- Significant period: 1907 (fabric); 1900s–1940s (historical)
- Significant components: pathway/walkway, trees/plantings, farmhouse
- Builders: Pattemore family

Fairview is a heritage-listed house at 15 Porter's Lane, Maleny, Sunshine Coast Region, Queensland, Australia. It was designed and built in 1907 by the Pattemore family. It is also known as Armstrong's House and Pattemore House. It was added to the Queensland Heritage Register on 4 September 2003.

== History ==
Fairview is a lowset, four-roomed timber dwelling under the core with four rooms under the stepped-down surrounding verandahs. It was constructed of beech (Nothofagus sp.) cut, pit sawn and dressed on the property, for John Robert and Emily Pattemore in 1907.

Aboriginal people had long known the Maleny district, on the Blackall Range behind Nambour, as an area where the important bunya pine (Araucaria bidwillii) grew. The first Europeans to live in the district were transient timber getters who heard from local Aboriginal people of the huge red cedar (Toona australis) trees on the Blackall Range. While timber was cut, it was not always shifted due to the lack of roads and steepness of the terrain. The first non-indigenous person to settle in the area was Isaac Burgess, who took up residence on his selection on 1 January 1872; others followed in the late 1870s. They built their homes using pit-sawn timber from their own land. Pits were dug near where the trees stood and there they were sawn down to scantlings and boardings, and afterwards planed, tongued and grooved by hand as required. As the red cedar was cut out attention turned to the beech trees and Maleny pioneers of the timber industry include Isaac Burgess, Francis and William Dunlop, Joseph McCarthy, and JD Campbell.

By 1886 there were sufficient people living in the district to necessitate the establishment of the Blackall Range School. About 1890 the area became known as Maleny, the same year that a small postal receiving office opened. In the late 1890s farmers in the Maleny area turned to dairying and by 1900 were sending cream by pack horse to Landsborough for railing to the Queensland Meat Export Company's Brisbane butter factory. The length of time it took to transport Maleny cream to Brisbane was problematic, encouraging Maleny farmers to establish their own co-operative dairy factory in 1903–04. The first cream was treated at the new Maleny Butter Factory on 19 December 1904. The factory proved very successful, and was replaced twice before closing in 1992.

During the first decade of the 20th century the little township of Maleny grew with the dairy boom. An ES&A Bank was established in 1906, a hotel was built the next year, and there was a butcher and general store. Maleny was listed as a township in Pugh's Almanac of 1912 for the first time: the district had a population of about 510 with town businesses including auctioneer, baker, butcher, blacksmith, 2 contractors, dairy factory, hotel, plumber, saddler, sawmiller and 2 store keepers.

The Pattemore family of New South Wales moved to the Maleny district in 1906–08. John Robert (Robert) Pattemore was born on 7 August 1850 in England. His parents emigrated to New South Wales in 1855, and raised their family at Ulladulla, New South Wales, where Mr Pattemore worked as a market gardener. Robert trained as a butcher. He married in 1871 and in 1879 he, his wife Emily and young family moved to Tilba Tilba, where he worked as a butcher. They later moved to Central Tilba where they operated both a butchery and a property called Myrtle Vale. They raised four sons and three daughters.

According to family folklore the 1902 drought was so severe that the Pattemore family decided to move to a farming area with more reliable rainfall. Sons William John (Bill) and Herbert Stanley (Stan) heard of the lush Blackall Range in Queensland, then being promoted for its dairying opportunities, and by 1906 were cutting timber there. In 1906 Bill began sawmilling at Maleny in partnership with Maleny fruitgrower Edward Thomas Francis Thynne as Thynne and Pattemore. Bill and Stan were joined by their brothers Ernest Edward and Albert Aaron Pattemore in 1907.

The Pattemores sold their New South Wales interests in 1906 and in 1906–07 Bill and Stan purchased 5 Maleny farm blocks for the Pattemore family - one for their father and one for each of the four sons. Title to portion 1257, the site on which Fariview was soon constructed, was registered in the name of John Robert Pattemore in September 1907. The block comprised 154 acres (62 ha), much of it bordered by Obi Creek.

Fairview was erected by the Pattemore sons in 1907 for their parents, Robert and Emily Pattemore, who followed them to Maleny in 1908. The house was constructed entirely of beech, used even for the original stumps. The brothers pit-sawed the timber on the property, hand planed it, and made 6-inch (150 mm) tongue-and-groove boards with a single beading. The sawdust from the work was left in a mound at the rear of the house, which was a feature of the rear garden for many years. The house comprised four rooms under the core roof, with an enclosed room at the rear end of each side verandah. Verandahs encircled the house, with the back verandah enclosed and used for a service room.

Robert and Emily arrived by ship in 1907. Unfortunately, Emily Pattemore contracted rheumatic fever around this time and was incapacitated for the rest of her life. Two widowed daughters came up from New South Wales to look after their mother.

By 1907 all of Robert Pattemore's sons were farming at Maleny. Bill Pattemore also retained his interest in the Thynne and Pattemore sawmill on Thynne's homestead block at Maleny. For some years there was also a mill on Fairview.

JR Pattermore operated his Maleny property as a dairy farm on the share farming principle. Albert built the share farmer's house, which has since been moved to Caloundra.

For some years Ernest worked as the share farmer on Fairview, but in 1923 moved to Nambour. Albert returned to butchering, first at Cooroy and later at Brisbane. Bill had moved to Cooroy about 1920 and by 1924, Stan was the only son remaining in Maleny, where he was farming his own property, Forest Lodge on Gardner's Road, north of his father's property. Fairview continued as a dairy farm, with a share farmer. Robert Pattemore continued milking a few cows and growing corn until the end of his life in 1947.

Ernest Pattemore's children, Arthur and Emily, visited Fairview frequently from the 1920s to the late 1940s. They remembered the place as quite a large house, with a front garden large enough for the cousins to play cricket. Either side of the front gate was a bunya pine, not a favourite of the children as underneath was too spiky and hurt their bare feet when playing. There were two mature Moreton Bay fig trees in the back garden.

A raised cobble path led from the front verandah to the front gate. The front and side verandahs had a balustrade and the verandah posts had decorative brackets. Under the back verandah roof was the kitchen, large breakfast room with windows, and a pantry. Leading from the breakfast room back door there was a raised path to the back gate about 6 to 10 metres (20 to 33 ft) away. To the left of the back door was the laundry under a skillion roof; it was paved with slats and cobble stones and had tubs, bench and copper. Later a laundry was moved inside adjacent to the bathroom under the verandah roof.

The house block was fenced - to keep the cattle out - and just beyond this fence was a shed that had space for the buggy, cow bails and dairy. There was a loft above, and that is where the corn was stored. In Robert's latter years his son Stan took on responsibility for the home farm, cultivating the corn and any farm work. His sisters continued to look after the house and parents.

Following Mrs Emily Pattemore's death at nearly 87 years in 1937, her husband remained on his farm, and in August 1941 celebrated his 91st birthday as Maleny's oldest resident. Following his death on 10 January 1947 title to his farm was transferred out of the Pattemore family in August 1948. Subsequent owners included the CSR in 1964 and by May 1969, the George Armstrong family. In 1995 Fairview was acquired from the Armstrong family by the Caloundra City Council. The house is rented and the land let to a farmer.

In recent years Fairview has been re-roofed, a skillion roofed verandah has been added at the rear, and a slatted balustrade has been constructed across the remaining open verandahs. The raised path still leads to the back of the property but the front path is overgrown and no longer leads to the front gate. The old farm shed out the back has been removed.

While most Maleny district houses of the late 19th and early 20th centuries were built of pit sawn local timber, few surviving houses of this type were identified in the 1995 Caloundra City Cultural Heritage Study. Included amongst these was Fairview, listed as Armstrong's House [MY 56], identified for its historic, aesthetic, representative value and integrity. A 2001 review of over 350 places identified in the 1995 survey resulted in a much shorter list of locally significant places. While some farm houses were noted the new list did not include any houses constructed of pit sawn local timber. The only building constructed of local pit-sawn timber included in the listing was the first stage of the Maleny Hotel [MY 26], erected in 1907. Fairview [Armstrong's House] (1907) was not included in the preliminary register as a place sufficiently well known or documented for its cultural heritage significance, but was included as a place worthy of further investigation.

== Description ==
Fairview is situated halfway down the steep slope which forms the backdrop to the township of Maleny, on the Blackall Range west of Nambour. It is a low-set timber house capped with a steeply pitched, corrugated iron clad, short ridge roof with gablets to the east and west, and stepped down surrounding verandah roofs. The verandahs have been enclosed on the western and southern sides and southeastern corner.

External walls are single-skin, vertically-jointed timber boards, diamond braced with belt rail, protected from the elements by skillion roofed verandahs. The front verandah has three bays, with a pair of verandah posts either side of the entrance. Square posts with simple stop chamfers support the roof and are enhanced with later decorative brackets. There is a later two-rail slatted balustrade across the open verandahs. There are three doors off the front verandah, French doors to both front rooms either side of a four-panel low waisted timber front door.

The front door opens onto a hallway which has doors to rooms on either side, before opening through a timber archway into a large dining room.

Internally all rooms under the core have walls of tongue and groove 6-inch (150 mm) wide boards that are beaded. The hall has a belt rail and hat rail on both walls. The two front bedrooms have a T&G ceiling and twin-paned sash windows to side verandahs, while the rear bedroom has French doors to the side verandah. There are clear glass fanlights above the front and back doors and rear bedroom French doors. All the bedrooms have a square of linoleum with the surrounding timber boards painted red. An exposed beam from the dining room juts into the front north eastern bedroom and hall, and these beams are visible in the dining room. The dining room and rear bedroom both have sheeted ceilings.

The western and southern verandahs have been enclosed with weatherboards and windows. About half of the eastern side also has been enclosed to form a large room. At the rear of the house and under the verandah roof are the kitchen and a large breakfast room. The northern wall of both the kitchen and breakfast room has diagonal braced vertically-jointed timber boards and the other walls are lined, including the stove recess with its old wood fire stove. The kitchen has a double row of three hopper windows facing south while the stove recess has louvers. The large breakfast room has a twin-pane sash window into the dining room, and a pair of casement windows, a set of four casement windows and door along the southern wall, and a door to the side verandah and kitchen. The southern facing external wall is protected by a [Skillion roof|skillion roof] over the paving and raised path to the back garden.

Fairview is surrounded by mature trees including frangipani (Plumeria sp.), avocados (Persea americana) and a Moreton Bay fig (Ficus macrophylla). The garden, which is enclosed by a barbed wire fence, has many mature trees.

== Heritage listing ==
Fairview was listed on the Queensland Heritage Register on 4 September 2003 having satisfied the following criteria.

The place is important in demonstrating the evolution or pattern of Queensland's history.

Fairview, constructed in 1907 of local Beech [Nothofagus sp.] cut, pit-sawn and dressed on the property, is important in demonstrating the early development of Maleny as an agricultural settlement and the expansion of dairying in Queensland in the early 1900s.

The place demonstrates rare, uncommon or endangered aspects of Queensland's cultural heritage.

It is one of the oldest surviving pit sawn timber residences in the area.

The place is important in demonstrating the principal characteristics of a particular class of cultural places.

It remains substantially intact, and is important in demonstrating the principal characteristics of early farmhouses of its era, with hand detailing, good workmanship, and idiosyncratic construction techniques, and is constructed of local timbers no longer widely available.

The place is important because of its aesthetic significance.

The materials, timber detailing and workmanship, and simple plan and form, demonstrate a strong aesthetic quality. Plantings around the house are remnants from when the property was an established dairy farm and add to the aesthetic appeal of the place.
