= Conondale Timbers Sawmill =

Conondale Timbers sawmill
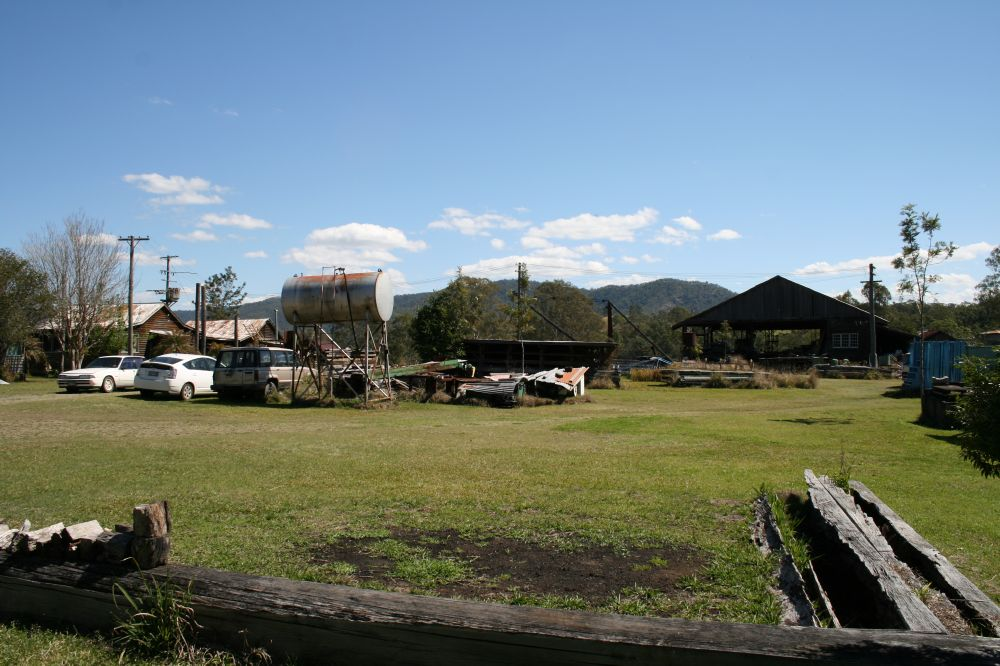
- Conondale Timbers Sawmill, 2007

- Location within Queensland Location within Australia
- 26.7483°S 152.7341°E
- Location: Aherns Road, Conondale, Sunshine Coast Region, Queensland, Australia

History
- Design period: 1919 - 1930s (interwar period)
- Built: 1930s

Queensland Heritage Register
- Official name: Conondale Timbers Sawmill, Conondale Timbers, Mill Workers Cottages
- Type: state heritage (built)
- Designated: 27 November 2008
- Reference no.: 602689
- Significant period: 1930s
- Significant components: residential accommodation - workers' housing, machinery/plant/equipment - forestry/timber industry, shed/s, crane / gantry, lumber yard, engine/generator shed/room / power supply
- Builders: M R Hornibrook Ltd

Conondale Timbers sawmill is a heritage-listed sawmill at 144 Aherns Road, Conondale, Sunshine Coast Region, Queensland, Australia. It was built in the 1930s by M R Hornibrook Ltd. It is also known as Conondale Timbers mill workers cottages. It was added to the Queensland Heritage Register on 27 November 2008.

== History ==
The Conondale Timbers Sawmill near the town of Conondale in the Sunshine Coast Region is was a large operating hardwood mill constructed in the early 1930s. It comprised the mill shed and equipment, plus ancillary structures including workers' housing. The mill was originally powered by steam, but has now been converted to electricity.

Sawmilling was a major industry on the North Coast hinterland in the 1930s: the coastal area between Brisbane and Gympie contained the highest concentration of sawmills in Queensland. More hardwood was cut on the North Coast (now known as the Sunshine Coast) than anywhere else in Queensland. Improvements in the road network and mechanised transport in the 1920s made sawmilling in remote areas such as Conondale more viable from the later interwar period.

The Conondale sawmill was built by M.R. Hornibrook Pty Ltd to supply timber for the Hornibrook Highway Bridge project that linked the Redcliffe Peninsula with the Brisbane suburbs of Brighton and Sandgate across the mouth of the North Pine River and Hays Inlet. At the time, M.R. Hornibrook Pty Ltd was among the most prominent civil engineering firms in Queensland. From 1918, Manuel Hornibrook and his company (formed in 1926) constructed a number of drainage and water supply systems for Brisbane and regional councils. By the early 1930s, their civil engineering projects had included a number of prominent bridges including an eight-span reinforced concrete bridge at Howard, the Grey Street Bridge (later renamed William Jolly Bridge) in Brisbane and an eight-span reinforced concrete bridge over the Coomera River.

The original layout of the mill has been largely preserved and follows the basic design principles for steam powered sawmills of the era. The break-down saws, comprising a frame saw and large circular saw were designed to make the initial cuts along the logs to create long slices of timber ('flitches'). These saws are located close to where the logs entered the mill near a loading platform at the side of the shed. The number one and the pendulum docking saws which converted the flitches into boards of the required cross-section and length are located further inside the shed. A small room for sharpening saws is built into a corner of the main shed.

Though the steam engine and transmission are now removed, the plan and construction of the mill reveal their former location. The boiler and engine sheds are extant, the latter containing the foundations of the steam engine. Power was transmitted to the saws and saw sharpening grinder from the steam engine via transmission shafts, belts and pulley wheels. The original transmission shafts and pulleys, though removed from the shed, remain on the site.

Most of the extant saws are original including the frame, circular break-down, number one and docking saws. The saw sharpening equipment is also original. All of this equipment was designed to be steam driven via flat belts and pulleys. The original transmission system continued to be used when the shed was first electrified: a large electric motor was simply connected to the main transmission shaft. Later, the transmission system was rendered redundant when the single large electric motor was replaced by smaller electric motors mounted directly onto each saw. As part of this upgrade, the original flat belts and pulley wheels on the saws were replaced by "V" belts and pulleys which transmitted drive directly from the saw mounted motors.

In addition to the main shed a number of structures originally built by M.R. Hornibrook Pty Ltd remain extant. These include a former ship's crane used in the construction of the mill and the mill workers' cottages. The five cottages along the southern boundary are in their original location while the cottage near the entrance gate has been shifted from elsewhere on the site. The group of five dwellings originally stood as detached two-room cottages, each with a veranda to the east and a fireplace projecting to the north. They have been altered since construction. Later work has been carried out on the far east cottage including the addition of enclosed space to form a larger residence and the addition of a small entrance deck allowing it to be used as an office. Following completion of the Hornibrook project, the mill continued to be operated by the Hornibrook subsidiary, Hamilton Sawmills. In the 1960s, the sawmill was purchased by Thurecht and Sons and then the Green family trading as Conondale Timbers. During the 1970s, the mill cut native hardwoods for use in house framing. About a third of production was brush-box used for flooring. It was purchased by ASIC in the late 1990's and decommissioned and no longer operating as a mills.

== Description ==
At the corner of 144 Aherns Road and Harper Creek Road in the Mary Valley some 15 kilometres (9.3 mi) northwest of Maleny and five kilometres south of Conondale, the Conondale Timbers mill site comprises a level elevated area which falls steeply to an area of river flats along Harper Creek. Structures associated with the sawmilling operations are on the elevated portion of the site and include the sawmill shed, crane, burning area, ablutions shed, six workers' cottages, timber racks, petrol bowser, storage tanks and an assortment of sheds. There are a number of items of equipment, machinery and vehicles scattered and stored about the site.

A pair of timber entrance gates open onto the site from Aherns Road. The property is fenced by timber, barbed wire and electric fences.

=== Sawmill shed ===
The site was dominated by a large open gable roofed shed framed with timber trusses supported on square timber posts. The roof has collapsed and is in two parts, the east portion is larger and higher and both roofs shelter a raised timber platform supported on timber stumps. A lower skillion roof lean-to the north of the shed shelters the former engine and boiler sheds. Roofs are clad with corrugated galvanised iron, the sheeting to the north side of the larger gable roof is more recent.

The raised timber platform accommodates gantries, benches, saws, trolleys, tracks and stacking areas of the mill operations. Two earth mounds to the south of the shed facilitate loading of logs onto the platform by fork lift. A conveyor belt travels west from the centre of the platform to a burning area adjacent. The burning area is unroofed and enclosed with sheets of corrugated iron. A small room to the northeast corner of the platform is timber framed and clad with weatherboards and accommodates the saw sharpening facilities. Part of the platform extends unroofed to the east with a set of trolley tracks running out along the southern side - this extension gives the mill the capacity to saw very long logs. A set of timber stairs descends from the northeast to the engine room. A set of timber stairs also descends from the west side of the platform. The area below the platform accommodated the transmission shafts, pulleys and other elements of the steam-driven operation.

When it was operating as a working mill, machinery and equipment accommodated on the platform includes a framing saw, breakdown saw, number one saw, docking saw, associated benches, trolleys and tracks. Saw sharpening equipment, benches and associated accessories are housed in the saw sharpening room.

The former engine and boiler sheds are immediately north of the main shed. Each of these spaces has a concrete slab floor and they are separated by an area of dirt floor. Concrete blocks stand to the middle of the concrete slab floor of the engine shed. Openings in the wall between the engine shed and the main shed and in the floor of the platform of the main shed indicate access for former shafts, belts, pulleys, ducts and other components of the early steam powered system. A range of equipment, machinery and other items are stored in the engine and boiler sheds.

=== Crane ===
The crane stands to the northwest of the mill shed, the timber arm able to swing across this area of the site lifting logs to the platform. The motor is housed in a small shed near the crane.

=== Workers' cottages ===
A row of five timber cottages runs along the south boundary of the property and one timber cottage stands to the northeast of the entrance gate. All are timber framed and clad with weatherboards oiled with a red oxide. Each of the group of five cottages stands on low timber stumps and is sheltered by a corrugated galvanised iron clad gable roof. Spaces between the cottages are partly or fully enclosed and roofed. The most easterly cottage of the group has a small timber deck to the north and the next two cottages west are connected by an enclosed space. The fourth cottage along has a timber clad extension running along the south side. There is a mixture of timber and aluminium framed windows throughout. A number of galvanised iron water tanks stand to the north of the cottages and downpipes are a mixture of PVC and metal.

Larger than the other dwellings, the cottage at the entrance gate has a corrugated galvanised iron clad gable roof and an enclosed verandah to the south.

== Heritage listing ==
Conondale Timbers Sawmill was listed on the Queensland Heritage Register on 27 November 2008 having satisfied the following criteria.

The place is important in demonstrating the evolution or pattern of Queensland's history.

The Conondale Timbers Sawmill (early 1930s) is important in demonstrating the development of the State's timber industry insofar as it exemplifies sawmills established on the North Coast (now the Sunshine Coast) when it was one of the most important timber producing regions in the State. In the 1930s, when the mill was established, the North Coast produced the most hardwood in the State and contained more sawmills than anywhere else in Queensland. The mill drew on the area's abundant hardwood resources to supply the construction of the Hornibrook Bridge.

As a sawmill established to supply wood for the Hornibrook Bridge (1932–1935), the mill is also important in demonstrating the development of Queensland's road systems in the 1930s. The Hornibrook Bridge was built during a period following the establishment of the Main Roads Board (1920) when roads in South East Queensland were being upgraded to accommodate increased motor vehicle usage. The Hornibrook Bridge improved motor vehicle access to Redcliffe and so made an important contribution to its development.

The place demonstrates rare, uncommon or endangered aspects of Queensland's cultural heritage.

The mill is one of the earliest known sawmills still operating in the North Coast region. It is uncommon in the region for its earliness, the intactness of its original fabric and layout, and its continuity of operation as a sawmill since the early 1930s. Economic and environmental factors, including the deregulation of the timber industry from the 1990s, have meant that intact sawmills from the interwar era are endangered and have become increasingly rare.

The place is important in demonstrating the principal characteristics of a particular class of cultural places.

The mill is important in demonstrating the principal characteristics of a steam driven hardwood sawmill of the 1930s with associated staff accommodation. The site includes the main sawmill shed housing the saws, benches and trolleys, the boiler and engine sheds, staff housing, log yard, crane and a creek from which water was drawn for the steam engine. Within the sawmill shed, the original layout of the mill has been largely preserved and follows the basic design principles for steam powered sawmills of the era. A saw sharpening room remains extant within this shed.

Though the steam engine and transmission system have now been removed, the plan and construction of the mill reveal their former location. Most of the original saws and ancillary equipment are also intact though modified to accommodate electric power. Extant saws include Canadian, frame, number one and pendulum docking saws arranged to allow efficient movement of the logs through the mill.

The place is important because of its aesthetic significance.

The sawmill shed has a large gable roof, substantial timber elements and a crane, while weathered timber and corrugated galvanised iron contribute to its industrial appearance. The mill site has a strong physical presence in the landscape and contrasts with the surrounding rural setting of rolling timbered hills, grassed paddocks, and smaller domestic and rural structures typical of this part of the Mary Valley.

The place has a special association with the life or work of a particular person, group or organisation of importance in Queensland's history.

The sawmill was built by M.R. Hornibrook Pty Ltd to supply hardwood for the Hornibrook Bridge. As such, it has special association with one of the State's most important civil engineers and with the bridge, one of the most important engineering projects of the interwar period. Hornibrook constructed the William Jolly Bridge and played key roles in the construction of the Story Bridge and the Sydney Opera House. The Hornibrook Bridge was a major engineering accomplishment; at the time it was Australia's longest bridge. It had an important influence on the development of Redcliffe.
