= Davenport Lake =

- Location within Georgia
- Location: Gilmer County, Georgia
- Coordinates: 34°47′20″N 84°32′07″W
- Lake type: reservoir
- Primary inflows: Harper Creek, East Mountain Town Creek
- Primary outflows: East Mountain Town Creek
- Basin countries: United States
- Surface area: 17 acres (6.9 ha)
- Max. depth: 30 ft (9.1 m)
- Surface elevation: 1,634 feet (498 m)
- Frozen: Never

Davenport Lake is a lake in the Dyer Gap area of Gilmer County, Georgia.

== Geometric properties ==
It is a private lake. It is 17 acres (6.9 ha) and is crawling with largemouth bass. It also has bluegill, and other bream, snapping turtles. It was built during the Great Depression. Its elevation is 1,634 feet (498 m). It is a reservoir off of East Mountain town trail. East Mountain Town Creek and Harper Creek flow into it. East Mountain Town Creek flows out. It is in the Chattahoochee National Forest. It was built by the Civilian Conservation Corps.
