= Mary Cairncross Reserve =

Conservation park in Queensland, Australia

Coordinates: 26°46′41.30″S 152°52′50.48″E

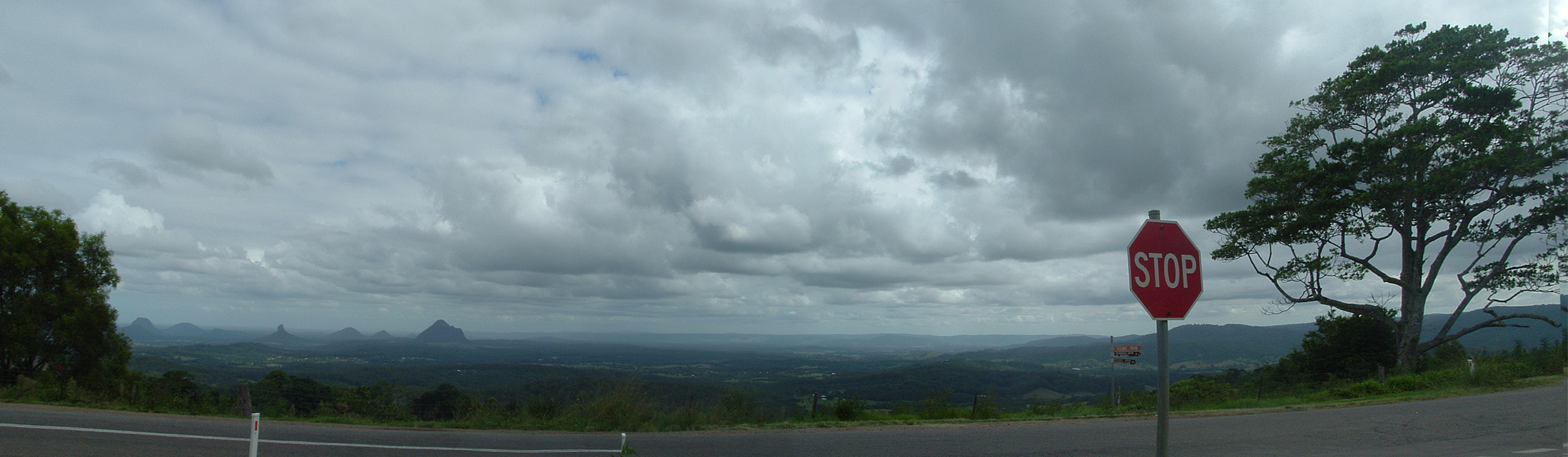
Glass House Mountains viewed from Mary Cairncross Reserve

The Mary Cairncross Reserve is a conservation park located on the Blackall Range east of Maleny, in the Sunshine Coast Region, Queensland, Australia. Maleny is approximately 88 kilometres (55 mi) north of Brisbane and 30 kilometres (18.6 mi) west of Caloundra. The reserve is positioned in the mountain rainforests of the Maleny region overlooking the Glass House Mountains.

== Geology ==
The Region holds many of the large predominate landforms in Queensland, the most recognisable is the Glass House Mountains. The Glass House Mountains were formed thousands of years ago when the outer layer of soil and rock eroded from the extinct volcanic summit. The dirt and soil located in the region is very rich and healthy, due to the high quantity of volcanic rock decomposed in the soil. Volcanic rock contains high amounts of nutrients.

== History ==
The Cairncross Reserve was given to the Landsborough Shire Council in 1941 by three Thynne sisters. They named the reserve after their mother, Mary Thynne (née Cairncross, born in 1848). Sunshine Coast Regional Council manages and maintains the reserve along with the volunteers that staff the Thynne Natural History Education Centre daily. The reserve was created to protect the flora and fauna of the Maleny region.

== The Rainforest ==
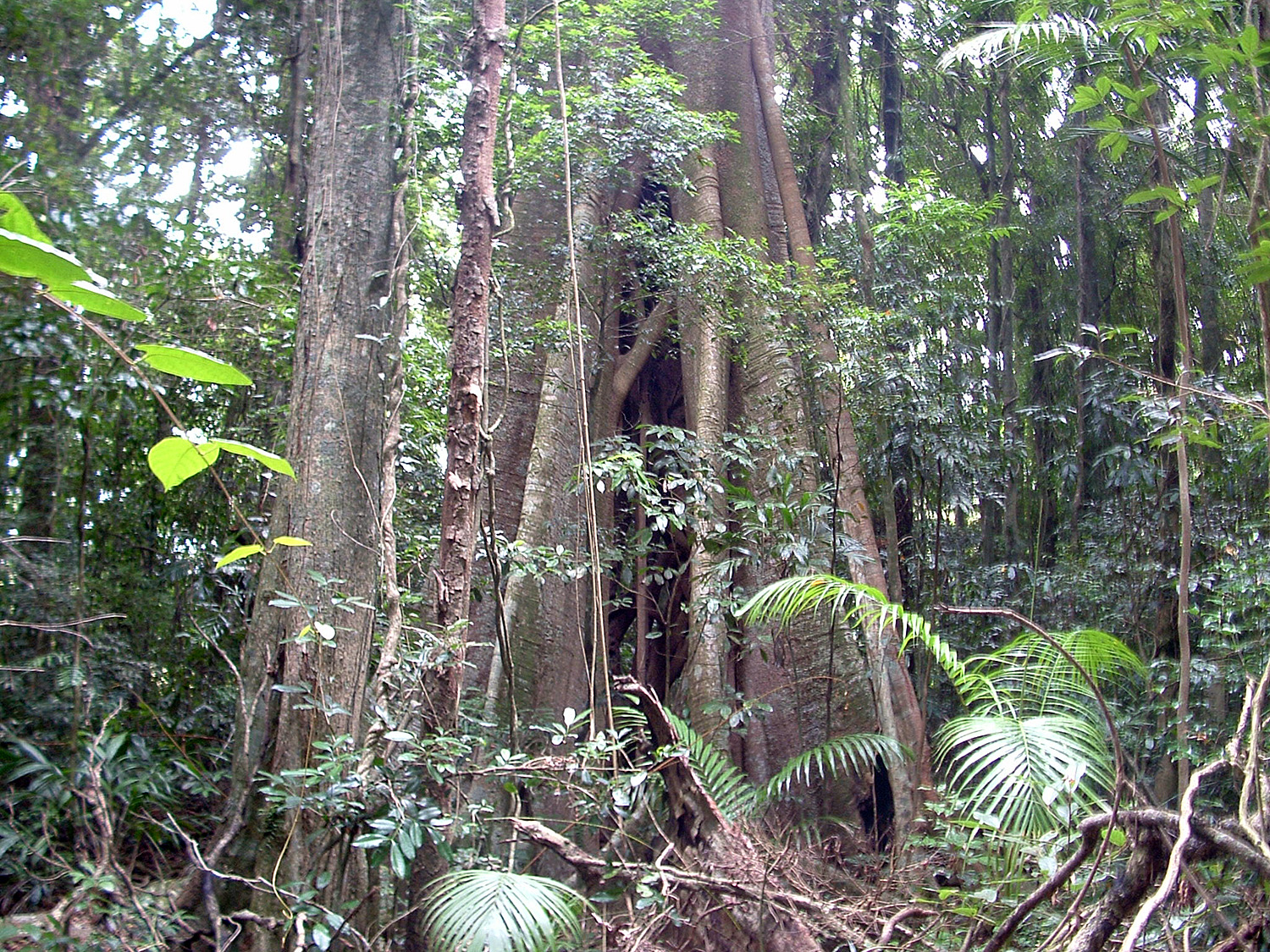
Mary Cairncross Reserve rainforest

The 55-hectare reserve consists of subtropical rainforest. These types of rainforests are mainly located in the north-east parts of Australia. The Cairncross reserve has an area of 530,000 square metres and reaches a peak canopy of 440 m. The main species of tree is the Australian red cedar. Strangler figs and fungi are some of the environmental elements that the rainforest needs to survive. The red-legged pademelon can be found at the park.

== Biodiversity ==
Plants found in the reserve include 107 species of tree, 30 herbs, 50 vines, 3 palms, 21 species of fungi and 26 kinds of shrubs. Animals include 139 birds including the wompoo fruit-dove, brown cuckoo-dove, tree-creepers, thornbills, scrub-wrens, green catbird as well as 11 different marsupials, 3 bats, 20 lizards, 14 snakes and 14 frog species.

== Facilities ==
The reserve contains a Rainforest Discovery Centre, walking tracks, a car park, barbecue and a cafe. The Mary Cairncross Scenic Reserve Discovery Centre building was opened in 2017 by the Governor of Queensland, Paul de Jersey AC. The building was designed by Maleny-based Building Designer, Norman Richards building design + interiors in collaboration with Brisbane-based Guymer Bailey Architects. The Mary Cairncross Scenic Reserve Discovery Centre has received the following awards:

- 2018 Australian Institute of Architects QLD Chapter - Harry Marks Award for Sustainable Architecture
- 2018 Australian Institute of Architects QLD Chapter - Commendation for Public Architecture
- 2018 Australian Institute of Architects - Sunshine Coast Region Award
- 2018 EDA Award for Economic Development Initiative
- 2017 Australian Institute of Landscape Architects State Award - Tourism Category
- 2017 Australian Institute of Landscape Architects Finalist National Award - Tourism Category
- 2017 QMBA Award for Excellence in Energy Efficiency & Environmental Management
- 2017 QMBA Award for Tourism and Leisure Facilities up to $10m
- 2017 IPWEAQ Excellence Award for Innovation

== See also ==
- Protected areas of Queensland
