= Elaman Creek, Queensland =

Elaman Creek
- Suburb
- Interactive map of Elaman Creek
- Coordinates: 26.7194°S 152.7802°E
- Country: Australia
- State: Queensland
- LGA: Sunshine Coast Region
- Location: 12.6 km (7.8 mi) NW of Maleny; 44.0 km (27.3 mi) SW of Nambour; 46.2 km (28.7 mi) WNW of Caloundra; 118 km (73 mi) NNW of Brisbane

Government
  - State electorate: Glass House
  - Federal division: Fisher

Area
  - Total: 12.6 km^{2} (4.9 sq mi)

Population
  - Total: 92 (2021 census)
  - Density: 7.30/km^{2} (18.91/sq mi)
- Time zone: UTC+10:00 (AEST)
- Postcode: 4552
Suburbs around Elaman Creek
Conondale	Curramore	Curramore
Conondale	Elaman Creek	Witta
Reesville	Reesville	Reesville

Elaman Creek is a rural locality in the Sunshine Coast Region, Queensland, Australia. In the 2021 census, Elaman Creek had a population of 92 people.

== Geography ==
The watercourse Elaman Creek, from which the locality takes its name, rises near Howells Knob in neighbouring Reesville to the south-east. It enters the locality of Elaman Creek from the south (Reesville) and exits to the west (Conondale) where it becomes a tributary of the Mary River.

The land use is predominantly grazing on native vegetation with some rural residential housing.

== History ==
In 1919, the Landsborough Shire Council decided to set aside 20 acres (8.1 ha) of land as a memorial park, but later decided on a larger more convenient site, which was officially opened on 3 March 1928.

Elaman Creek State School opened about 1940. It closed about 1960. The school was on the northern side of the Maleny - Kenilworth Road (approx 26.7173°S 152.77232°E).

== Demographics ==
In the 2016 census, Elaman Creek had a population of 68 people.

In the 2021 census, Elaman Creek had a population of 92 people.

== Education ==
There are no schools in Elaman Creek. The nearest government primary school is Conondale State School in neighbouring Conondale to the west. The nearest government secondary school is Maleny State High School in Maleny to the south-east.

== Amenities ==
Despite the name, Conondale Memorial Recreation Park (but known locally at Green Park) is at 1156 Maleny Kenilworth Road in Elaman Creek (26.7255°S 152.7621°E). It features a motocross circuit used by the Sunshine Coast Motorcycle Club for both local and wider competitions.
