= Curramore, Queensland =

Curramore
- Suburb
- Interactive map of Curramore
- Coordinates: 26.6761°S 152.7544°E
- Country: Australia
- State: Queensland
- City: Sunshine Coast
- LGA: Sunshine Coast Region
- Location: 12.0 km (7.5 mi) NNW of Maleny; 43.7 km (27.2 mi) WSW of Nambour; 45.5 km (28.3 mi) NW of Caloundra; 113 km (70 mi) N of Brisbane

Government
  - State electorates: Glass House; Nicklin
  - Federal divisions: Fisher; Fairfax

Area
  - Total: 36.8 km^{2} (14.2 sq mi)

Population
  - Total: 198 (2021 census)
  - Density: 5.380/km^{2} (13.94/sq mi)
- Time zone: UTC+10:00 (AEST)
- Postcode: 4552
Suburbs around Curramore
Kenilworth	Kidaman Creek	Kidaman Creek
Cambroon	Curramore	Obi Obi; Witta
Conondale	Conondale	Elaman Creek

Curramore is a rural locality in the Sunshine Coast Region, Queensland, Australia. In the 2021 census, Curramore had a population of 198 people.

== History ==
Curramore State School opened on 11 August 1913 and closed in 1939. It was on the south-eastern corner of the junction of Curramore Road and Bytheway Lane (approx 26.68961°S 152.78654°E).

== Demographics ==
In the 2016 census, Curramore had a population of 190 people.

In the 2021 census, Curramore had a population of 198 people.

== Education ==
There are no schools in Curramore. The nearest government primary schools are Conondale State School in neighbouring Conondale to the south-west and Maleny State School in Maleny to the south-east. The nearest government secondary schools are Maleny State High School (to Year 12) in Maleny and Mary Valley State College (to Year 10) in Imbil to the north-west.

== Attractions ==
Obi Lookout is on Schultz Road (26.6880°S 152.8047°E).
