= Crystal Waters, Queensland =

Housing development in Australia

Crystal Waters
- Coordinates: 26.785°S 152.714°E
- Country: Australia
- State: Queensland
- LGA: Sunshine Coast Region

Government
  - State electorate: Glass House
  - Federal division: Fisher

Area
  - Total: 2.591 km^{2} (1.000 sq mi)

Population
  - Total: 250 (?)
  - Density: 96.5/km^{2} (250/sq mi)
- Time zone: UTC+10 (AEST)

Crystal Waters (also known as Crystal Waters Permaculture Village and Crystal Waters Ecovillage) is an 85 Lot Body Corporate housing development situated in Conondale in the Sunshine Coast hinterland of Queensland, Australia.

In 1996, the village of Crystal Waters was a finalist in the World Habitat Awards by the Building and Social Housing Foundation for its "pioneering work in demonstrating new ways of low impact, sustainable living". In 1998, the village of Crystal Waters was included in the "World's Best Practices" database of the United Nations organization.
