= Harper Creek, Queensland =

Harper Creek Queensland
- Coordinates: 26.7509°S 152.7398°E
- Population: 400 (2006 census)
  - Density: 2.9/km^{2} (7.5/sq mi)
- Postcode(s): 4552
- Area: 138 km^{2} (53.3 sq mi)
- Location: 19.6 km (12 mi) W of Maleny; 51.4 km (32 mi) SW of Nambour; 54.9 km (34 mi) WNW of Caloundra; 115 km (71 mi) NNW of Brisbane
- LGA(s): Sunshine Coast Region
- State electorate(s): Caloundra
- Federal division(s): Fisher
Mean max temp	Mean min temp	Annual rainfall
30.3 °C; 87 °F	19.8 °C; 68 °F	1,403.8 mm 55.3 in

Harper Creek is a former locality in the Sunshine Coast hinterland in Queensland, Australia. It is now within the locality of Conondale in the Sunshine Coast Region. In the 2006 census, Harper Creek had a population of 400 people. Harper Creek was 12 kilometres (7.5 mi) south of the town of Cambroon.

== Climate ==
Climate data for Harper Creek, Queensland
Month	Jan	Feb	Mar	Apr	May	Jun	Jul	Aug	Sep	Oct	Nov	Dec	Year
Record high °C (°F)	43.7 (110.7)	—	—	—	—	—	—	—	—	—	—	—	43.7 (110.7)
Mean daily maximum °C (°F)	30.7 (87.3)	29.7 (85.5)	28.7 (83.7)	26.5 (79.7)	24.1 (75.4)	21.6 (70.9)	21.6 (70.9)	23.2 (73.8)	25.8 (78.4)	27.6 (81.7)	28.5 (83.3)	29.7 (85.5)	30.3 (86.5)
Mean daily minimum °C (°F)	19.8 (67.6)	19.9 (67.8)	18.6 (65.5)	15.7 (60.3)	12.6 (54.7)	10.9 (51.6)	9.3 (48.7)	9.4 (48.9)	12.0 (53.6)	14.4 (57.9)	16.5 (61.7)	18.4 (65.1)	19.8 (67.6)
Record low °C (°F)	14.0 (57.2)	—	—	—	—	—	—	—	—	—	—	—	14.0 (57.2)
Average precipitation mm (inches)	200.2 (7.88)	201.6 (7.94)	172.5 (6.79)	116.2 (4.57)	122.9 (4.84)	77.5 (3.05)	63.4 (2.50)	45.4 (1.79)	47.1 (1.85)	86.8 (3.42)	114.1 (4.49)	156.1 (6.15)	1,403.8 (55.27)
Source: Bureau of Meteorology
