= Reesville, Queensland =

Reesville
- Suburb
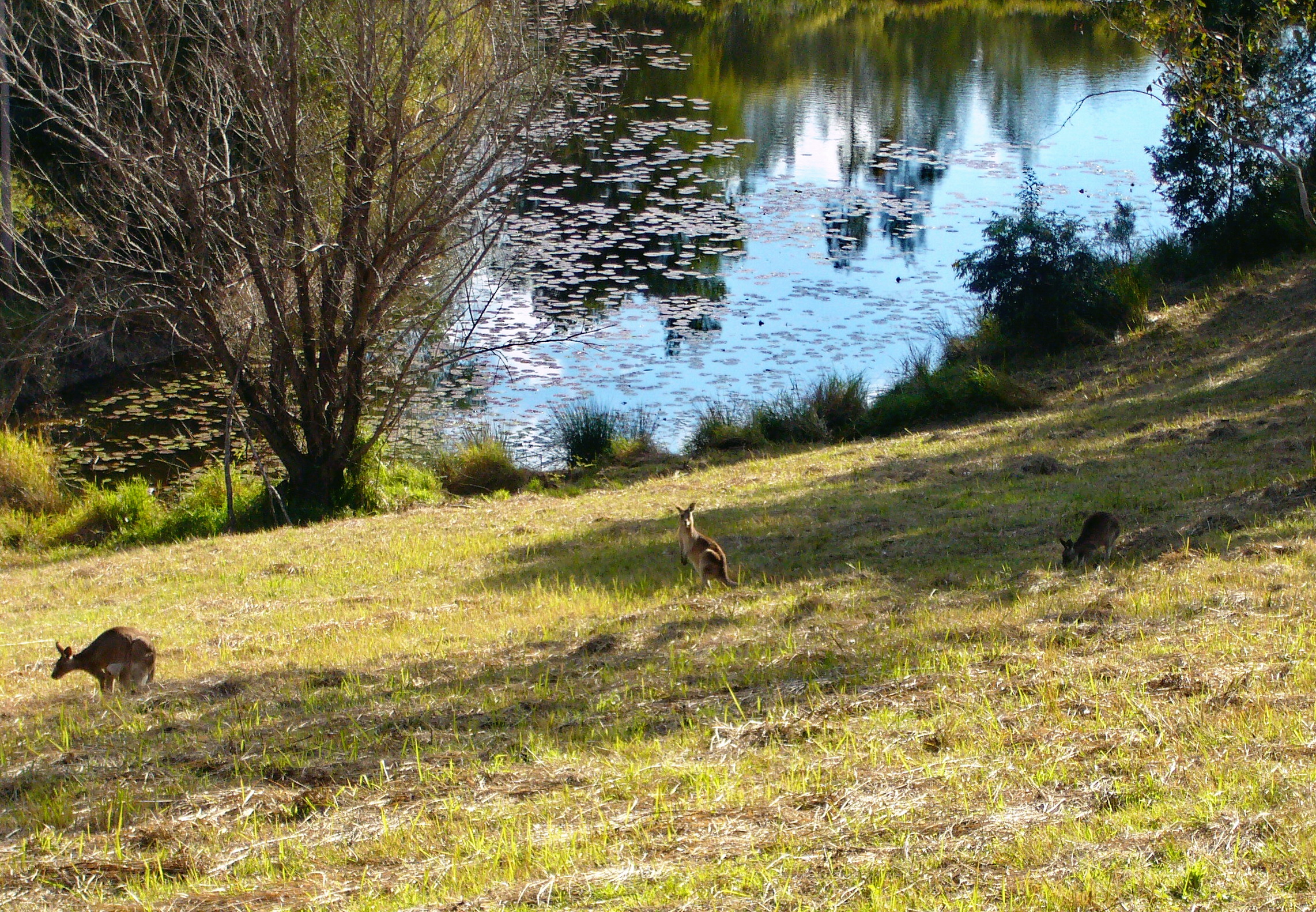
- Rural landscape, Reesville

- Interactive map of Reesville
- Coordinates: 26.7569°S 152.7975°E
- Country: Australia
- State: Queensland
- LGA: Sunshine Coast Region
- Location: 5.4 km (3.4 mi) W of Maleny; 36.8 km (22.9 mi) SW of Nambour; 38.9 km (24.2 mi) WNW of Caloundra; 97.5 km (60.6 mi) N of Brisbane

Government
  - State electorate: Glass House
  - Federal division: Fisher

Area
  - Total: 28.7 km^{2} (11.1 sq mi)

Population
  - Total: 573 (2021 census)
  - Density: 19.97/km^{2} (51.71/sq mi)
- Time zone: UTC+10:00 (AEST)
- Postcode: 4552
Suburbs around Reesville
Elaman Creek	Elaman Creek	Witta
Conondale	Reesville	Maleny
Conondale	Wootha	Wootha

Reesville is a rural locality in the Sunshine Coast Region, Queensland, Australia. In the 2021 census, Reesville had a population of 573 people.

== History ==
Reesville was named in 1922 by the Landsborough Shire Council after Henry Oliver Rees (1862-1923)—a member of its community who owned a plant nursery and mixed fruit orchard there.

== Demographics ==
In the 2016 census, Reesville had a population of 567 people.

In the 2021 census, Reesville population increased to 573 people.

== Education ==
There are no schools in Reesville. The nearest government primary school is Maleny State School in Maleny to the east. The nearest government secondary school is Maleny State High School, also in Maleny.

== Attractions ==
Howell's Knob Lookout is a tourist attraction off Reesville Road (26.7601°S 152.8099°E).
