= Witta, Queensland =

Witta
- Town
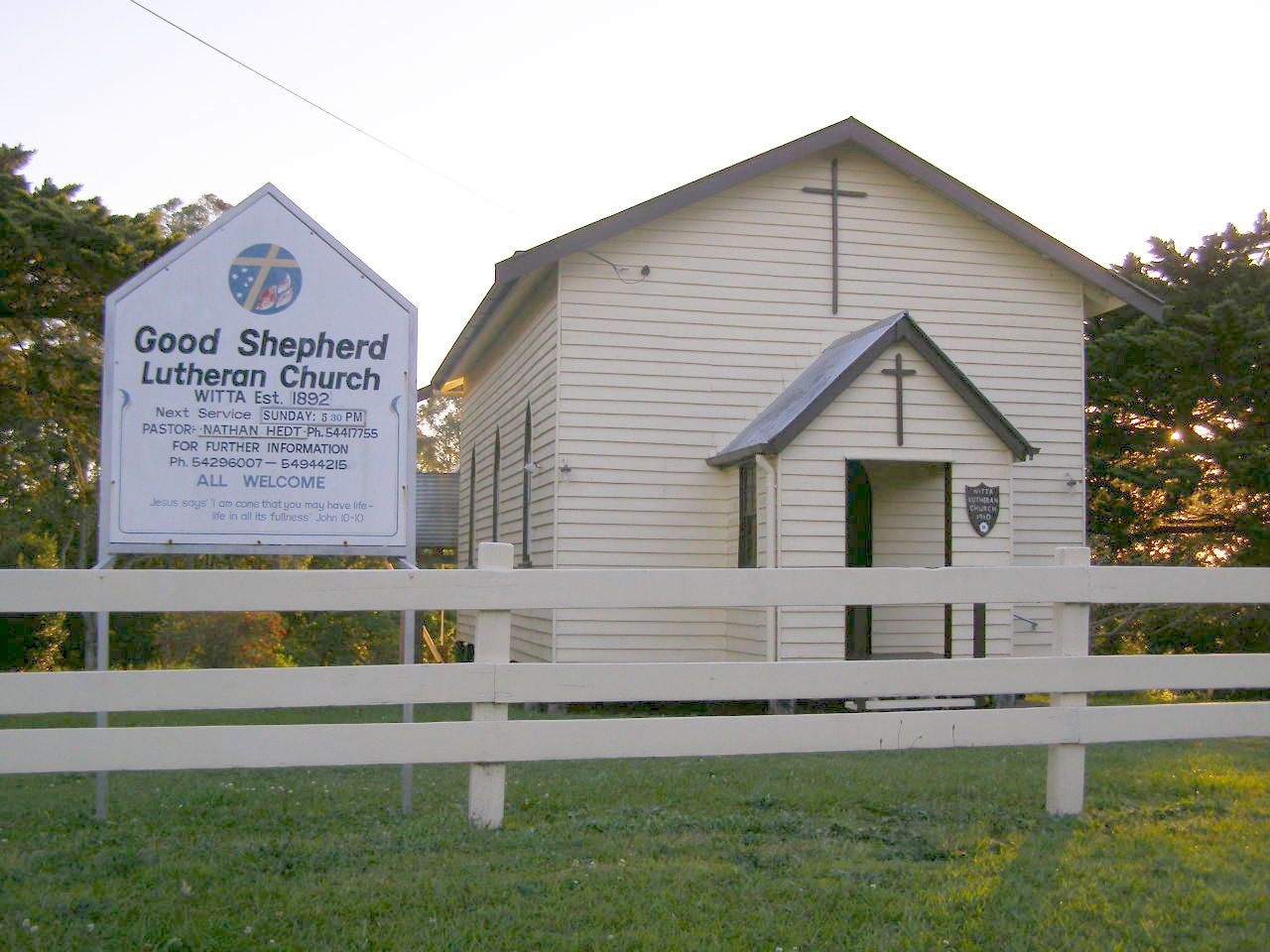
- Good Shepherd Lutheran Church, 2006

- Interactive map of Witta
- Coordinates: 26.6975°S 152.8119°E
- Country: Australia
- State: Queensland
- LGA: Sunshine Coast Region
- Location: 8.7 km (5.4 mi) NW of Maleny; 40.1 km (24.9 mi) SW of Nambour; 42.2 km (26.2 mi) WNW of Caloundra; 105 km (65 mi) N of Brisbane

Government
  - State electorate: Glass House
  - Federal division: Fisher

Area
  - Total: 35.3 km^{2} (13.6 sq mi)

Population
  - Total: 1,296 (2021 census)
  - Density: 36.71/km^{2} (95.09/sq mi)
- Time zone: UTC+10:00 (AEST)
- Postcode: 4552
Localities around Witta
Obi Obi	Obi Obi	Montville
Curramore	Witta	North Maleny
Elaman Creek	Reesville	Maleny

Witta, formerly known as Teutoberg (German: [ˈtɔɪ̯toːbɛʁk] TOY-toh-berk) or Teutoburg ([ˈtɔɪ̯toːbʊʁk] TOY-toh-boork) is a rural town and locality in the Sunshine Coast Region, Queensland, Australia. In the 2021 census, the locality of Witta had a population of 1,296 people.

== Geography ==
Witta is located within the Blackall Ranges. The lower land is mostly cleared for residential and farming purposes. The higher land is largely undeveloped natural bushland.

== History ==
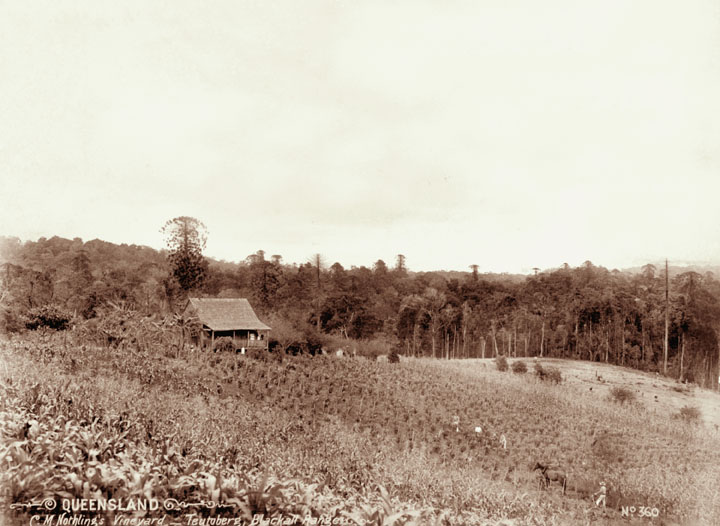
C M Nothlings vineyard and shingle roof cottage at Teutoberg, circa 1899

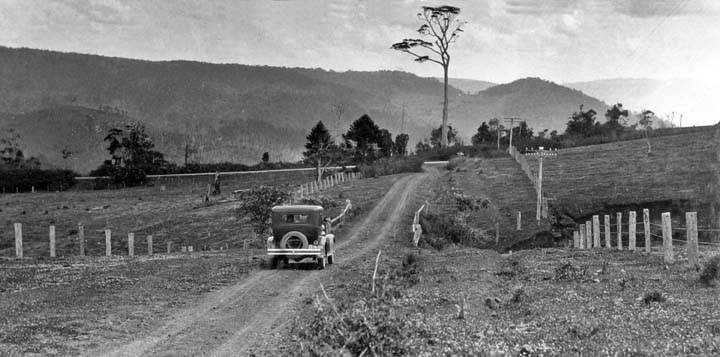
Looking from Witta Road towards Conondale, circa 1931

Witta was first settled around 1887 by German immigrant families. They called it Teutoberg (also spelled Teutoburg), possibly referring to the Teutoburg Forest area in Germany. The town was renamed in 1916 during World War 1 due to anti-German sentiment. The name Witta is a corruption of the word wetya meaning dingo in the Kabi language.

Maleny Provisional School opened on 1 October 1892 with the first enrolments on 3 October 1892. It was renamed Teutoberg Provisional School in 1893. It became Teutoberg State School in 1909, and Witta State School in 1926. The school closed on 23 August 1974. It was at 316 Witta Road (26.7086°S 152.8268°E).

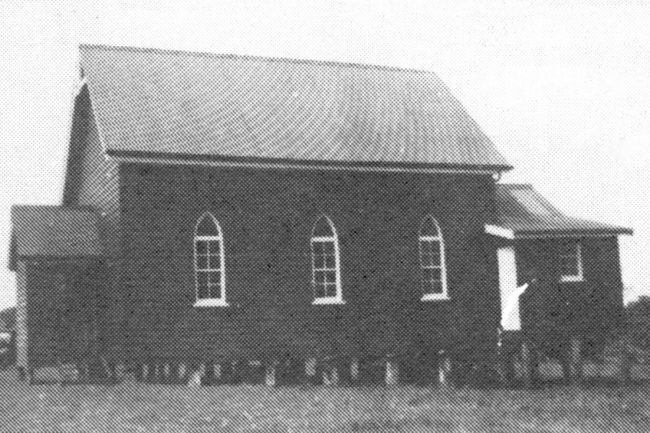
Good Shepherd Lutheran Church, Witta, 7 April 1946, at a re-dedication service

Teutoburg Lutheran Church was built in 1893. In 1911, it was demolished to enable a new timber church to be erected. The Good Shepherd Lutheran Church was opened and dedicated on 22 January 1911.

A reserve for a School of Arts (often known as Mechanics' institutes outside Queensland) was gazetted in 1907. The School of Arts was opened on 7 October 1908 by Harry Frederick Walker, Member of the Queensland Legislative Assembly for Wide Bay.

== Demographics ==
In the 2011 census, the locality of Witta had a population of 1,230 people.

In the 2016 census, the locality of Witta had a population of 1,201 people.

In the 2021 census, the locality of Witta had a population of 1,296 people.

== Education ==
There are no schools in Witta. The nearest government primary school is Maleny State School and the nearest government secondary school is Maleny State High School, both in neighbouring Maleny to the south-west.

== Amenities ==
The Old Witta School Community Centre (the former Witta State School building) is at 316 Witta Road (26.7086°S 152.8268°E). The building celebrated its centenary on 8 June 2025.

Good Shepherd Lutheran Church is at 295 Witta Road (26.711208°S 152.8275°E).

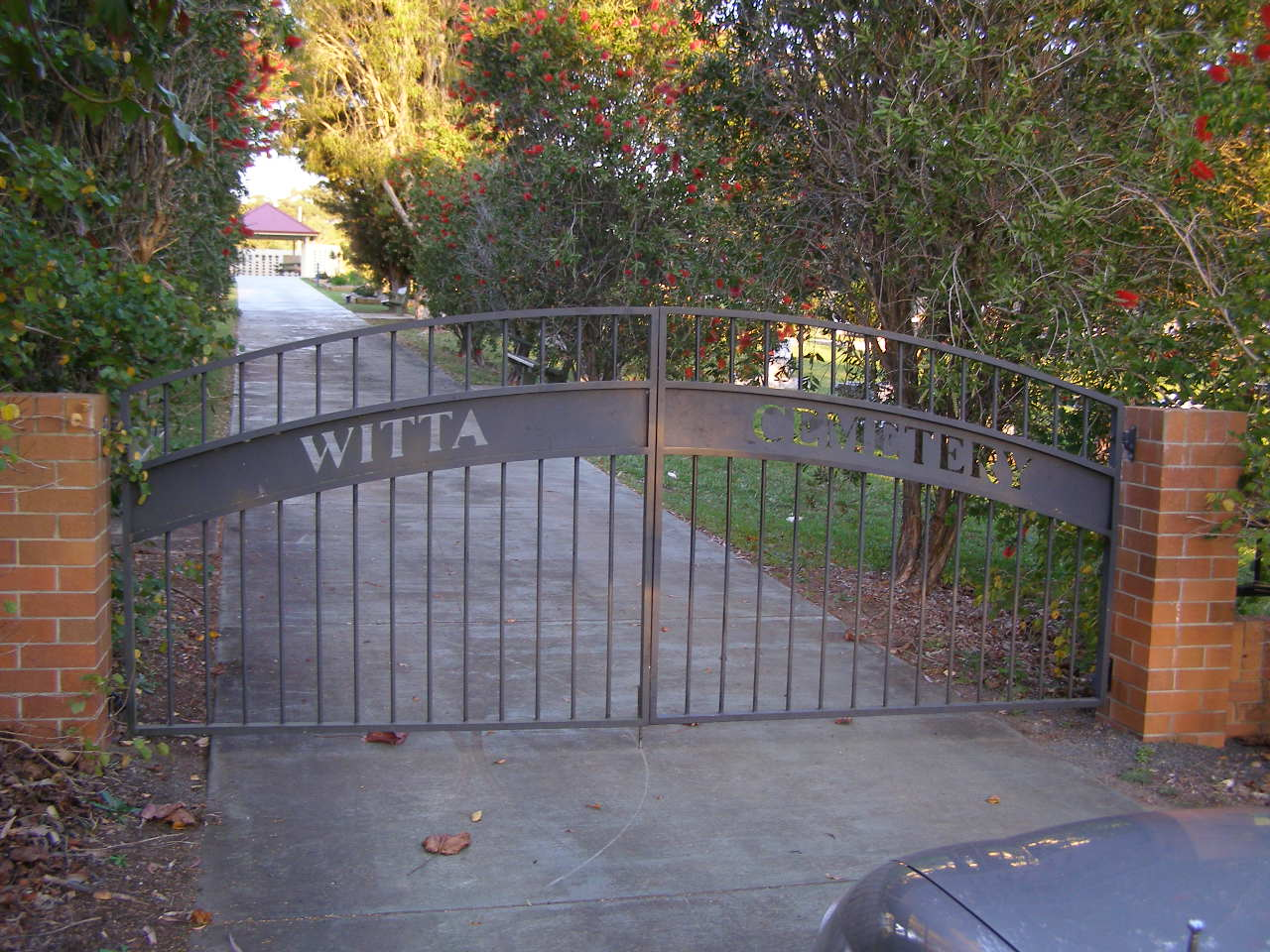
Witta Cemetery gates, 2006

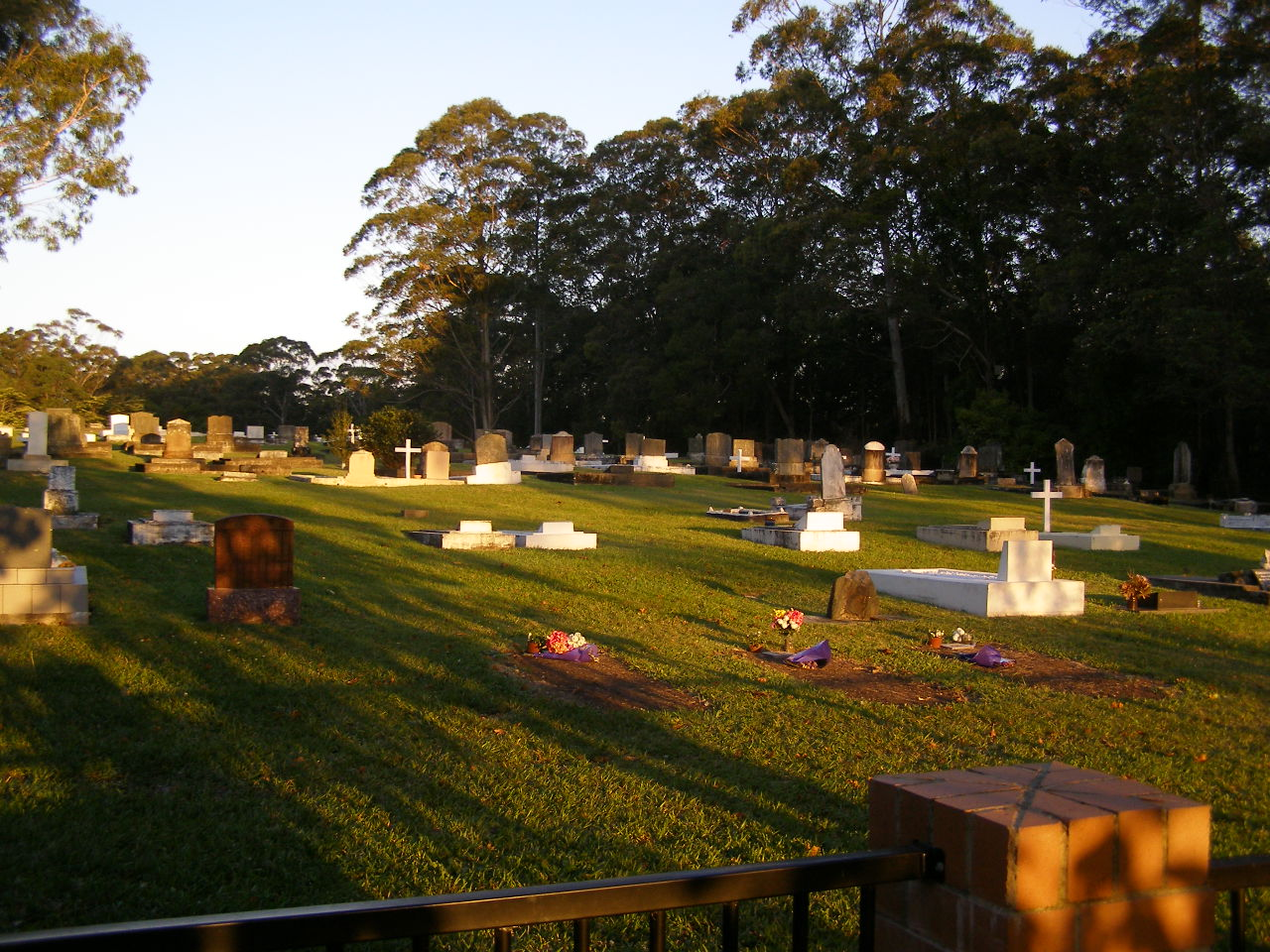
Witta Cemetery, 2006

There is a small cemetery on Witta Road (26.7062°S 152.8268°E).

== Attractions ==
Obi Lookout is on Schultz Road (26.6880°S 152.8047°E).

== Notable people ==
- Otto Nothling, born in Witta, represented Australia in cricket and rugby union

== See also ==
- Mechanics' institutes of Australia
- Blackall Range road network
