= Wootha, Queensland =

Wootha
- Suburb
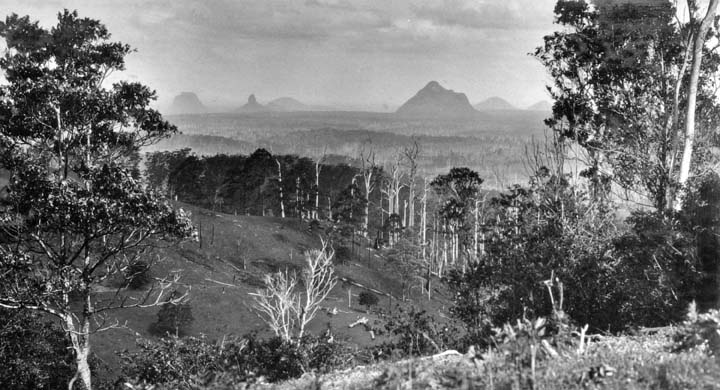
- Looking across Wootha towards the Glass House Mountains, circa 1931

- Interactive map of Wootha
- Coordinates: 26.7875°S 152.8002°E
- Country: Australia
- State: Queensland
- LGA: Sunshine Coast Region
- Location: 7.2 km (4.5 mi) SW of Maleny; 37.7 km (23.4 mi) SW of Nambour; 38.4 km (23.9 mi) W of Caloundra; 97.0 km (60.3 mi) N of Brisbane

Government
  - State electorate: Glass House
  - Federal division: Fisher

Area
  - Total: 16.1 km^{2} (6.2 sq mi)

Population
  - Total: 258 (2021 census)
  - Density: 16.02/km^{2} (41.50/sq mi)
- Time zone: UTC+10:00 (AEST)
- Postcode: 4552
Suburbs around Wootha
Reesville	Reesville	Maleny
Conondale	Wootha	Crohamhurst
Booroobin	Booroobin	Peachester

Wootha is a rural locality in the Sunshine Coast Region, Queensland, Australia. In the 2021 census, Wootha had a population of 258 people.

== History ==
The name Wootha comes from the Kabi language (Dallambara dialect) meaning red cedar tree.

Blackall Range Provisional School opened on 18 October 1886 in a building constructed by Mr J. McCarthy on his own land. The first teacher was William Verrant. After a few years, the school building was relocated to land belonging to Mr R. Johnston. In 1900, it was relocated to its permanent site in Wootha at 369 Maleny-Stanley River Road (26.78186°S 152.82153°E). It became Blackall Range State School on 1 October 1909. A new school building was constructed circa 1912. It was officially renamed Wootha State School in 1937, although the name had been in informal use for some time. It closed circa 29 April 1949 with transport being provided so the children could attend Maleny State school. In 1950, the Wootha school building was relocated to Palmwoods State School to provide an additional building.

== Demographics ==
In the 2016 census, Wootha had a population of 201 people.

In the 2021 census, Wootha had a population of 258 people.

== Education ==
There are no schools in Wootha. The nearest government primary and secondary schools are Maleny State School and Maleny State High School respectively, both in neighbouring Maleny to the north-east.

== Amenities ==
There are a number of parks in the area:

- Maleny-Stanley River Road Park (26.7796°S 152.8330°E)
- Policeman Spur Environmental Reserve (26.8002°S 152.7817°E)

== Attractions ==
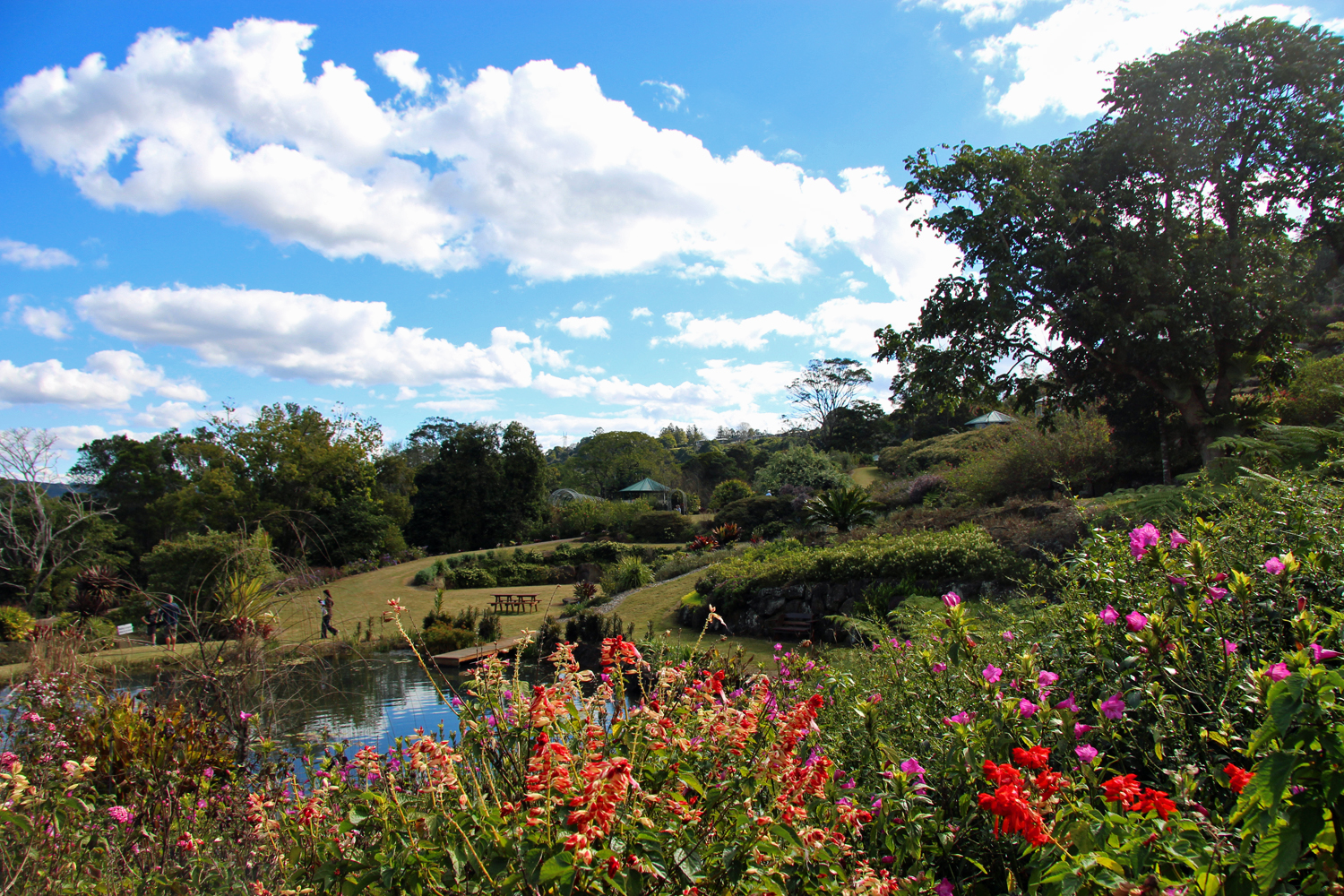
Maleny Botanic Gardens

Despite its name, Maleny Botanic Gardens and Bird World is at 233 Maleny Stanley River Road in Wootha (26.7800°S 152.8346°E).

== See also ==
Blackall Range road network
