= Conondale, Queensland =

Conondale
- Town
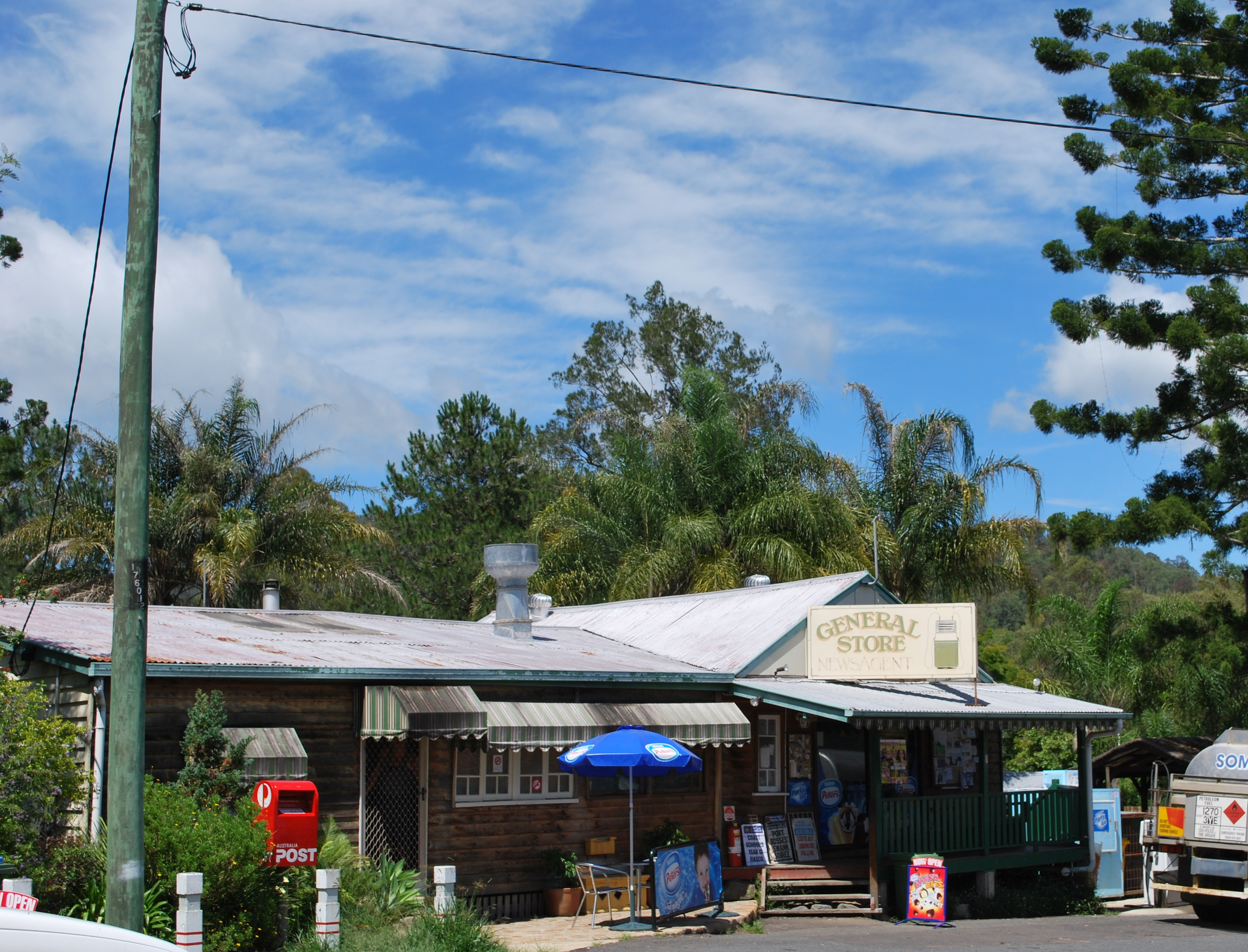
- Conondale General store

- Interactive map of Conondale
- Coordinates: 26.7311°S 152.7183°E
- Country: Australia
- State: Queensland
- LGA: Sunshine Coast Region
- Location: 19.4 km (12.1 mi) W of Maleny; 50.2 km (31.2 mi) SW of Nambour; 52.8 km (32.8 mi) W of Caloundra; 121 km (75 mi) N of Brisbane

Government
  - State electorate: Glass House
  - Federal division: Fisher

Area
  - Total: 170.3 km^{2} (65.8 sq mi)

Population
  - Total: 882 (2021 census)
  - Density: 5.179/km^{2} (13.414/sq mi)
- Time zone: UTC+10:00 (AEST)
- Postcode: 4552
Localities around Conondale
Kenilworth	Cambroon	Curramore
Jimna	Conondale	Elaman Creek; Reesville
Sandy Creek	Booroobin	Wootha; Bellthorpe

Conondale is a rural town and locality in the Sunshine Coast Region, Queensland, Australia. In the 2021 census, the locality of Conondale had a population of 882 people.

== Geography ==
The town is in the Sunshine Coast hinterland area. The town is located on the banks of the upper Mary River, 114 kilometres (71 mi) north of the state capital, Brisbane.

== History ==
On 6 October 1851, pastoralist Donald Tuach McKenzie took up a pastoral run, which he named Conondale after hist birthplace on the Conon River in Ross and Cromarty, Scotland. The town takes its name from the pastoral run.

In November 1906, a sub-division of the former Conondale Station, the Conondale Estate, described as 14,000 acres in one of the best agricultural and dairying districts in the Commonwealth, was advertised for sale. The auctioneers offered to forward an illustrated lithograph to any address. As a new departure in the sub-division of estates, a butter factory was built by the vendors as part of the sale. However, the butter factory never operated and the building was later demolished, with the timbers used for the construction of a house at Moffat Beach.

Conondale Provisional School and Flagstone Creek Provisional Schools opened in September 1912, both on a half-time basis, meaning that a single teacher was shared between the two schools. In 1913, Flagstone Creek Provisional School was renamed Conondale South Provisional School. In 1915, Conondale South Provisional School was closed and Conondale Provisional School continued with the teacher on a full-time basis. It experienced occasional closures due to lack of students or unavailability of a teacher. In 1933, it became Conondale State School.

In 1919, the Landsborough Shire Council decided to set aside 20 acres (8.1 ha) of land as a memorial park in Conondale, but later decided on a larger more convenient site, which was officially opened on 3 March 1928.

Conondale Post Office opened by 1949 (a receiving office or Telegraph office had been open from 1904) and closed in 1974.

== Demographics ==
In the 2016 census, the locality of Conondale had a population of 858 people.

In the 2021 census, the locality of Conondale had a population of 882 people.

== Heritage listings ==
Conondale has a number of heritage-listed sites, including:

- Conondale Timbers Sawmill, Aherns Road

== Education ==
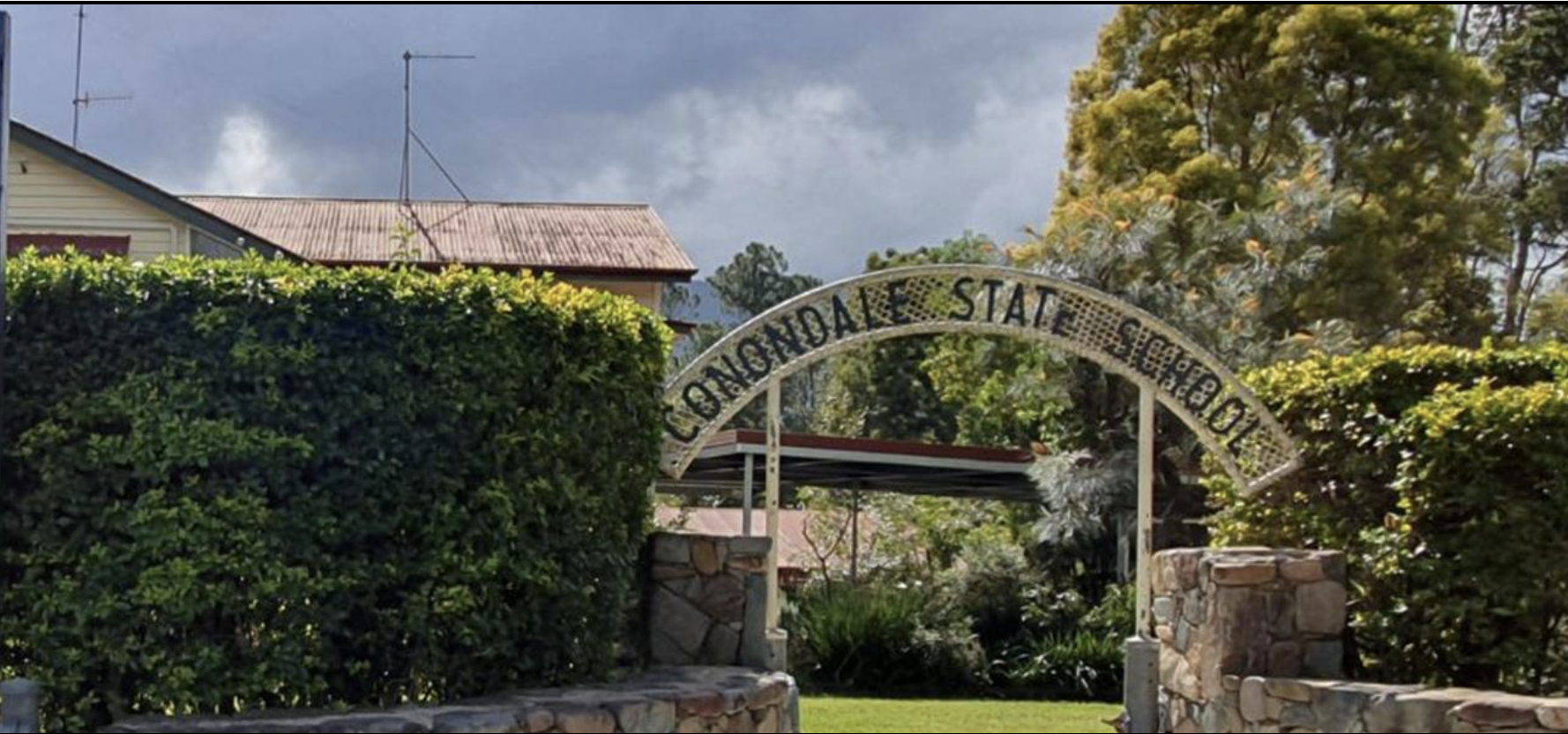
Conondale State School, 2026

Conondale State School is a government primary (Prep-6) school for boys and girls at 1700 Maleny-Kenilworth Road (26.7294°S 152.7186°E). In 2017, the school had an enrolment of 92 students with 10 teachers (6 full-time equivalent) and 10 non-teaching staff (5 full-time equivalent). It includes a special education program.

There are no secondary schools in Conondale. The nearest government secondary schools are Maleny State High School (to Year 12) in Maleny to the east, Woodford State School (to Year 10) in Woodford to the south, and Kilcoy State High School (to Year 12) in Kilcoy to south-west..

== Amenities ==
The Sunshine Coast Regional Council operates a mobile library service which visits the school on Maleny-Kenilworth Road.

Despite the name, Conondale Memorial Recreation Park (but known locally at Green Park) is at 1156 Maleny Kenilworth Road, now within the present-day boundaries of neighbouring Elaman Creek. It features a motocross circuit used by the Sunshine Coast Motorcycle Club for both local and wider competitions.

== Crystal Waters ecovillage ==
Conondale is home to the Crystal Waters ecovillage which provides accommodation for 200 residents. It was established formally in 1987 making it one of the first in Australia.

== See also ==
- Conondale Range
