= Maleny, Queensland =

Maleny
- Town
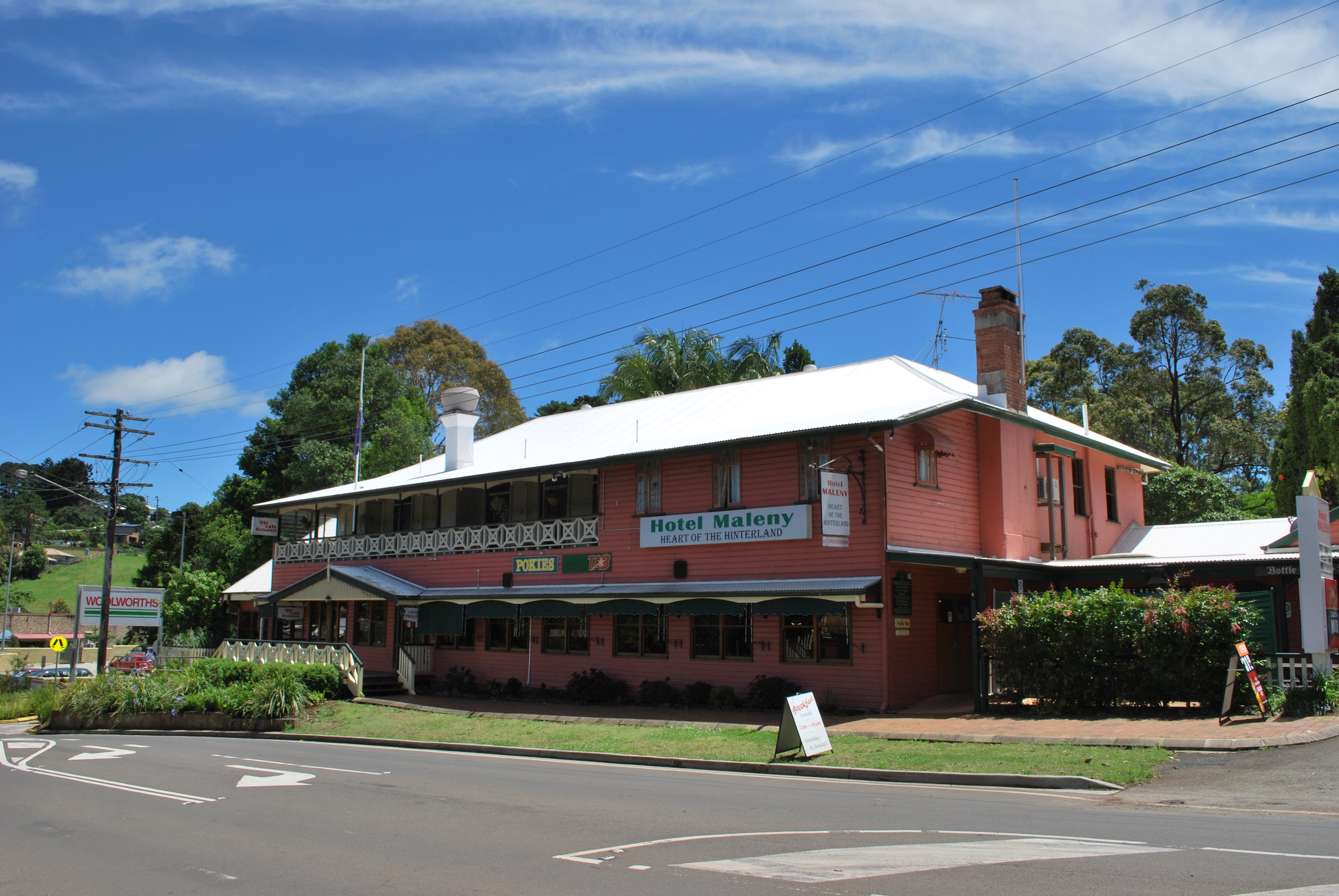
- Maleny Hotel, Bunya Street (2008)

- Interactive map of Maleny
- Coordinates: 26.7580°S 152.8513°E
- Country: Australia
- State: Queensland
- LGA: Sunshine Coast Region
- Location: 31.0 km (19.3 mi) SW of Nambour; 34.1 km (21.2 mi) W of Caloundra; 40.8 km (25.4 mi) WSW of Maroochydore; 91.6 km (56.9 mi) N of Brisbane

Government
  - State electorate: Glass House
  - Federal division: Fisher

Area
  - Total: 24.9 km^{2} (9.6 sq mi)
- Elevation: 425 m (1,394 ft)

Population
  - Total: 3,959 (2021 census)
  - Density: 159.0/km^{2} (411.8/sq mi)
- Time zone: UTC+10:00 (AEST)
- Postcode: 4552
- Mean max temp: 23.2 °C (73.8 °F)
- Mean min temp: 14.2 °C (57.6 °F)
- Annual rainfall: 2,000.8 mm (78.77 in)
Localities around Maleny
Witta	North Maleny	Balmoral Ridge
Reesville	Maleny	Bald Knob
Wootha	Crohamhurst	Crohamhurst

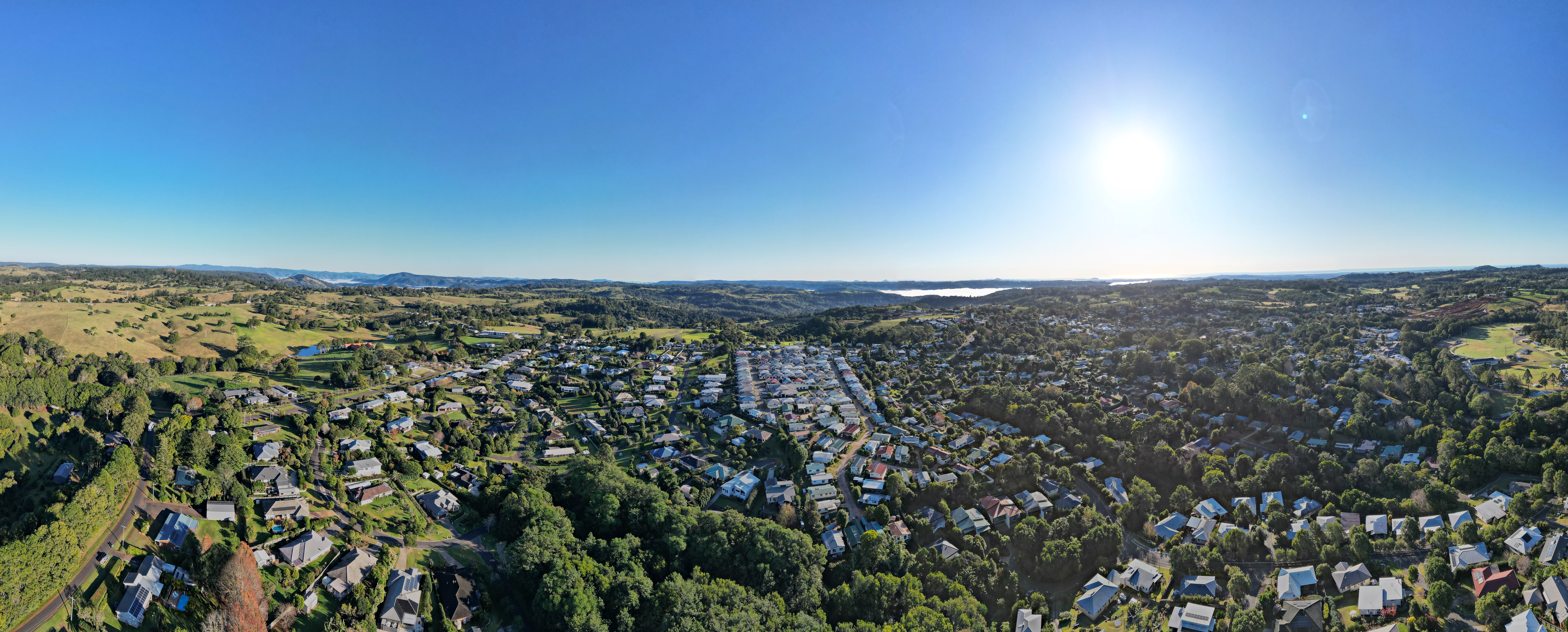
Aerial panorama of Maleny facing Lake Baroon. 2023.

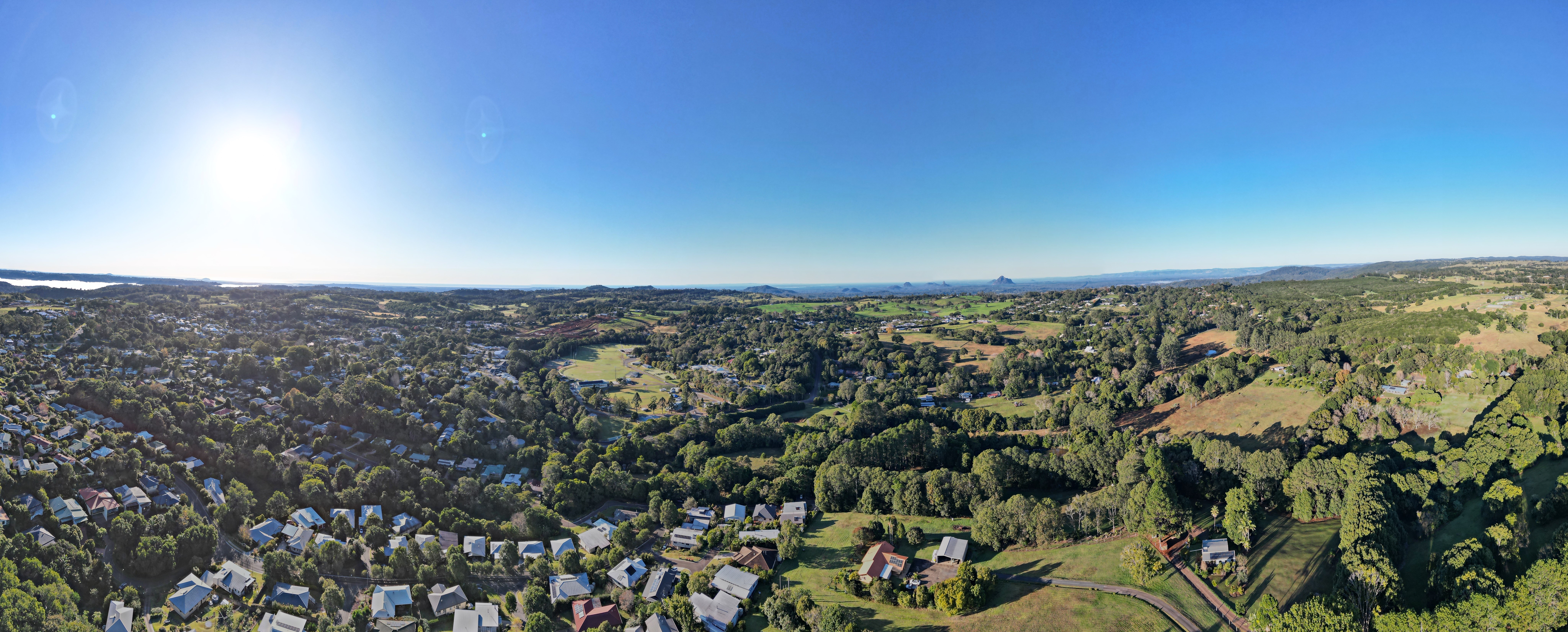
Aerial panorama of Maleny facing the hinterland. 2023.

Maleny (pronounced muh-LAY-nee) is a rural town and locality in the Sunshine Coast Region, Queensland, Australia. Maleny was a timber town until the early 1920s and then was a centre of dairy production and fruit growing. In the 2021 census, the locality of Maleny had a population of 3,959 people.

== Geography ==
Maleny is 90 kilometres (56 mi) north of Brisbane on the Blackall Range overlooking the Sunshine Coast hinterland. Nearby towns include Landsborough, Montville, Peachester, Palmwoods and Hunchy. Nearby places of geographical significance include the Glass House Mountains and Baroon Pocket Dam (in North Maleny).

Baroon Pocket Dam constructed in 1989 is fed by the Obi Obi Creek, a significant tributary of the upper Mary River, which drains the basalt capped Maleny plateau. Water runoff statistics have been kept in this area since the 1940s showing that the average annual rainfall is 2,037 millimetres (80.2 in) and the runoff into Baroon Pocket Dam receives annually about 64,000 megalitres. The Baroon Pocket Dam holds about 61,000 megalitres of water and the treatment plant supplies about 150 megalitres of treated water to the Sunshine Coast daily.

Maleny is situated approximately 450 metres (1,500 ft) above sea level, among the characteristic rolling green hills of the Sunshine Coast hinterland. Prior to European settlement, the area was covered in thick sub-tropical rainforest with huge hardwood trees. Loggers in the late 19th and early 20th centuries opened up the area seeking valuable timber, which was prized locally and in Europe. Heavy logging led to the almost complete denuding of the rainforest clad hills in the district around Maleny. Only a few pockets of forest remain in steeper terrain and in one large remnant patch (around 40 hectares [100 acres]) which now forms Mary Cairncross Reserve.

Landsborough–Maleny Road enters from the east, Maleny–Montville Road exits to the north-east, Maleny–Kenilworth Road exits to the north-west, and Maleny–Stanley River Road exits to the south-west.

== History ==
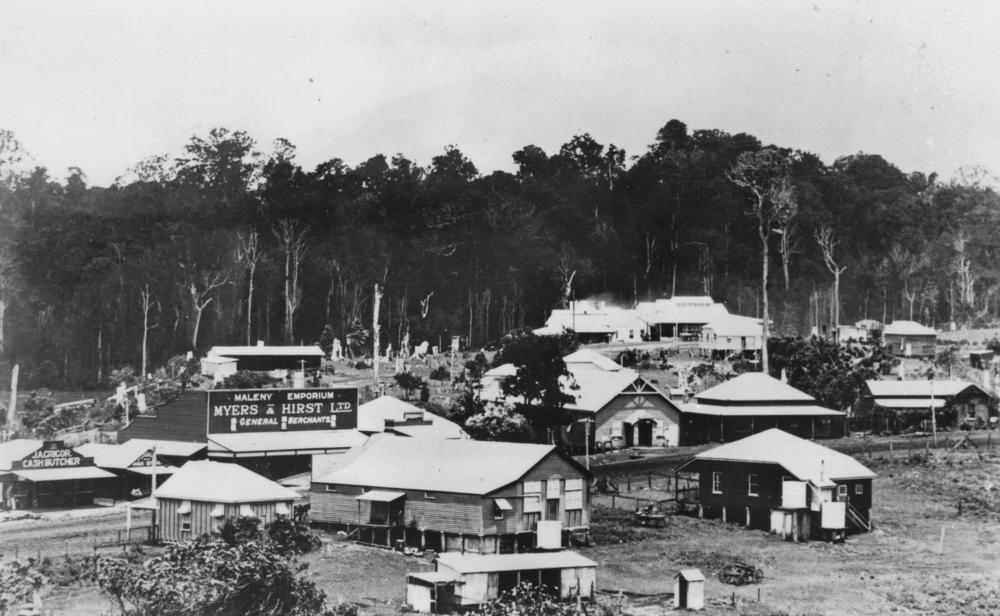
Maleny circa 1922

The name Maleny is probably derived from the parish name, which in turn is possibly derived from the Scottish place name Malleny, a historic house and garden in the Midlothian village of the same name.

The area around Maleny was originally populated by the Nalbo and the Dallambara — two aboriginal tribes of the Gubbi Gubbi language group. The area was known for its bunya feasts which happened every third year when the giant bunya tree was in fruit.

The first European to document Maleny was the explorer Ludwig Leichhardt who describes the area in his travel diary in 1844. The first European settlement followed in the wake of the Gympie gold rush of 1867. A track linking Maleny to Landsborough was cut in 1880.

An official proclamation of Maleny as a town occurred in 1891. Since just after the turn of the 20th century, the Maleny Community Centre has provided facilities to residents and visitors for a wide range of activities. The Maleny Butter Factory began operation in 1904. Two years later, Maleny Post Office opened by February 1906. (A receiving office had been open from 1889.)

Maleny Township State School opened on 22 April 1913. In 1915 its name was changed to Maleny State School. Maleny State High School opened 27 January 1987.

Maleny Baptist Church opened in July 1914. The Maleny branch of the Queensland Country Women's Association was formed in 1929.

St George's Anglican Church was dedicated on 6 September 1931 by Archbishop Sharp. It had been relocated from the Beerburrum Soldier Settlement where it was dedicated (also as St George's) on 20 August 1922 by Canon D.J. Garland, but it fell into disuse due to the failure of the settlement and was formally closed in August 1931 prior to its removal to Maleny. The building was originally built as a chapel at the Enoggera army barracks during World War I by the Soldiers' Church of England Help Society. Many of the furnishings and ornaments of the church were donated in memory of soldiers who had died, including the altar and its furnishings which were donated in the member of Earl Kitchener.

Although a campaign to have a police station in the town was started in the 1920s, it wasn't until 1952 that permission to convert a house into the police station and residence (in use until 2017) was granted.

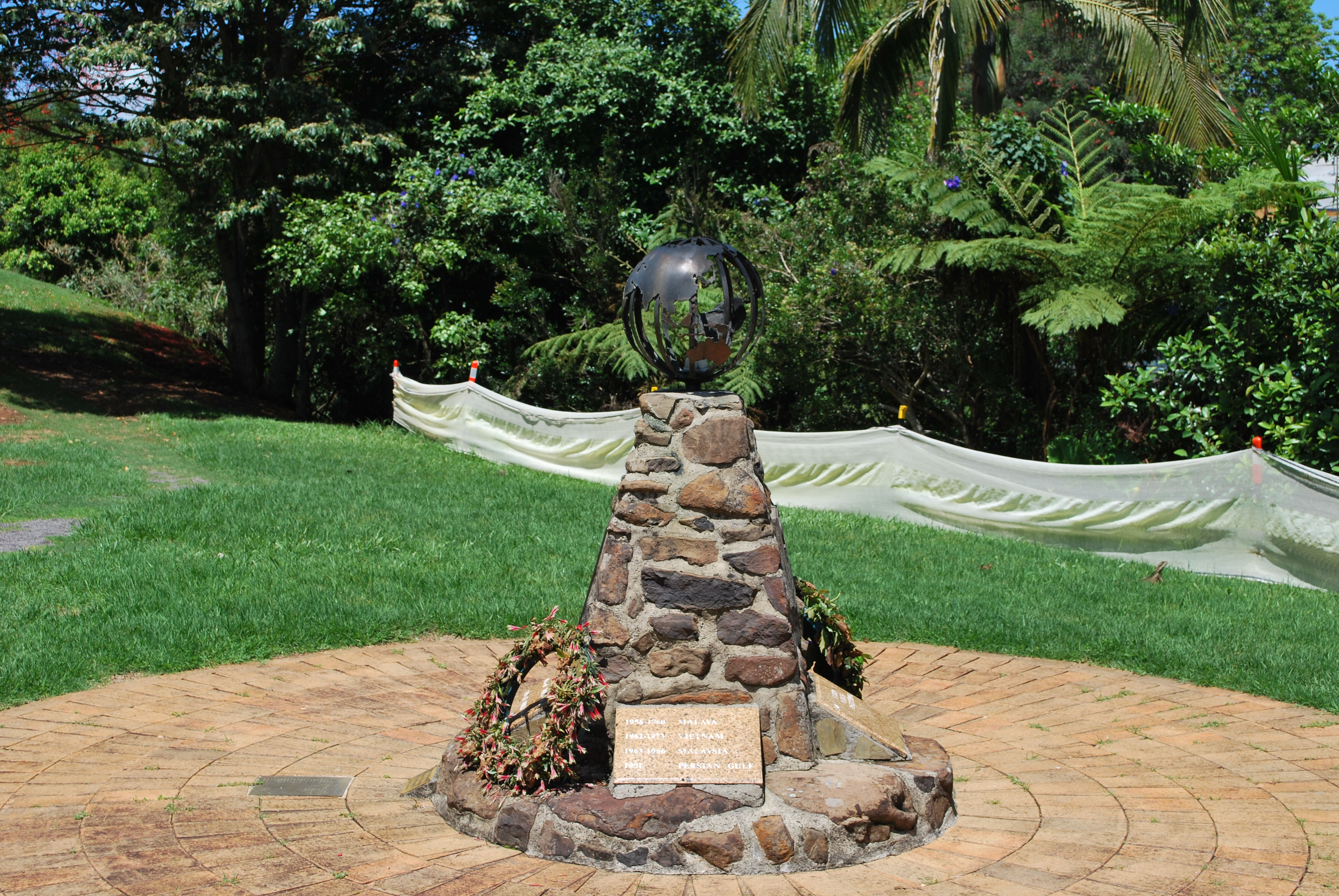
Maleny War Memorial, 2008

On 15 August 1995, the Queensland Governor Leneen Forde dedicated the Maleny War Memorial.

Maleny hosted the Maleny Folk Festival from its inception in 1987 to 1993, when it was moved to the nearby town of Woodford and renamed to the Woodford Folk Festival.

The Maleny Library was opened in 1998 with a major refurbishment in 2012.

Maleny's population growth since 2000 has brought an increase in urban development. Many local residents have resisted some of the development, the most notable being the establishment of a Woolworths store in the town. In July 2005, a rally attracted about 300 protestors objecting to the store. Many locals were opposed to the idea. (79% of local residents opposed according to "Market Facts" survey of 20 July 2005.) A number of motivations for the protest existed but of particular concern was that the supermarket was to be built over a significant platypus habitat and that local traders would be negatively affected as well as issues regarding local council members going against the original town planning agreement regarding all development in Maleny to be in fitting with "the village environ" that characterises much of the townships of the Blackall Range. Badges and posters reading "I WON'T SHOP THERE" were seen in Maleny as part of the anti-Woolworths campaign, although the bumper stickers can now be seen in the Woolworths car park. The campaign against the supermarket achieved international coverage. Despite protests and an offer to purchase the site for A$2 million (pledged by local residents) the supermarket opened on 3 April 2006. Although many residents refuse to shop in the supermarket, nonetheless Woolworths recorded it as one of its top 30 stores in 2008.

In 2013, many residents protested the construction of a petrol station and convenience store at 19 & 21 Bunya St, Maleny by the IGA Supermarket. Protestors cited proximity to the primary school as the main issue with the development proposal. The proposal was abandoned by the owners of the IGA supermarket who said "We don't want to embroil our business in something that is controversial."

In 2016, Sydney-based advertising executive and author David Rollins proposed a "TT Style" motorcycle race for the Maleny area. Maleny residents formed a protest group to oppose this event called "Peaceful Roads Sunshine Coast." The group protested the event citing safety, noise and access issues of concern and that the event was not in keeping with the existing tourism activities in the area. The application was withdrawn in August 2018.

In 2018, Jeanette Jamieson became the Anglican priest in charge of the Parish of Maleny, having previously served in the Parish of Kilcoy.

Maleny Independent School was a private secondary (7–10) school at 23 Coral Street (26.7171°S 152.8176°E). It opened in 1918, initially offering Years 7 and 8. In 2019, the school had an enrolment of 25 students with one principal (0.8 full-time equivalent), three teachers (part-time) and one non-teaching staff (part-time). As of 2024, the school has closed.

== Demographics ==
In the 2016 census, the locality of Maleny had a population of 3,734 people.

In the 2021 census, the locality of Maleny had a population of 3,959 people.

== Heritage listings ==
Maleny has a number of heritage-listed sites, including:

- Fairview, 15 Porter's Lane
- Maleny Lodge Guest House, 58 Maple Street

== Economy ==
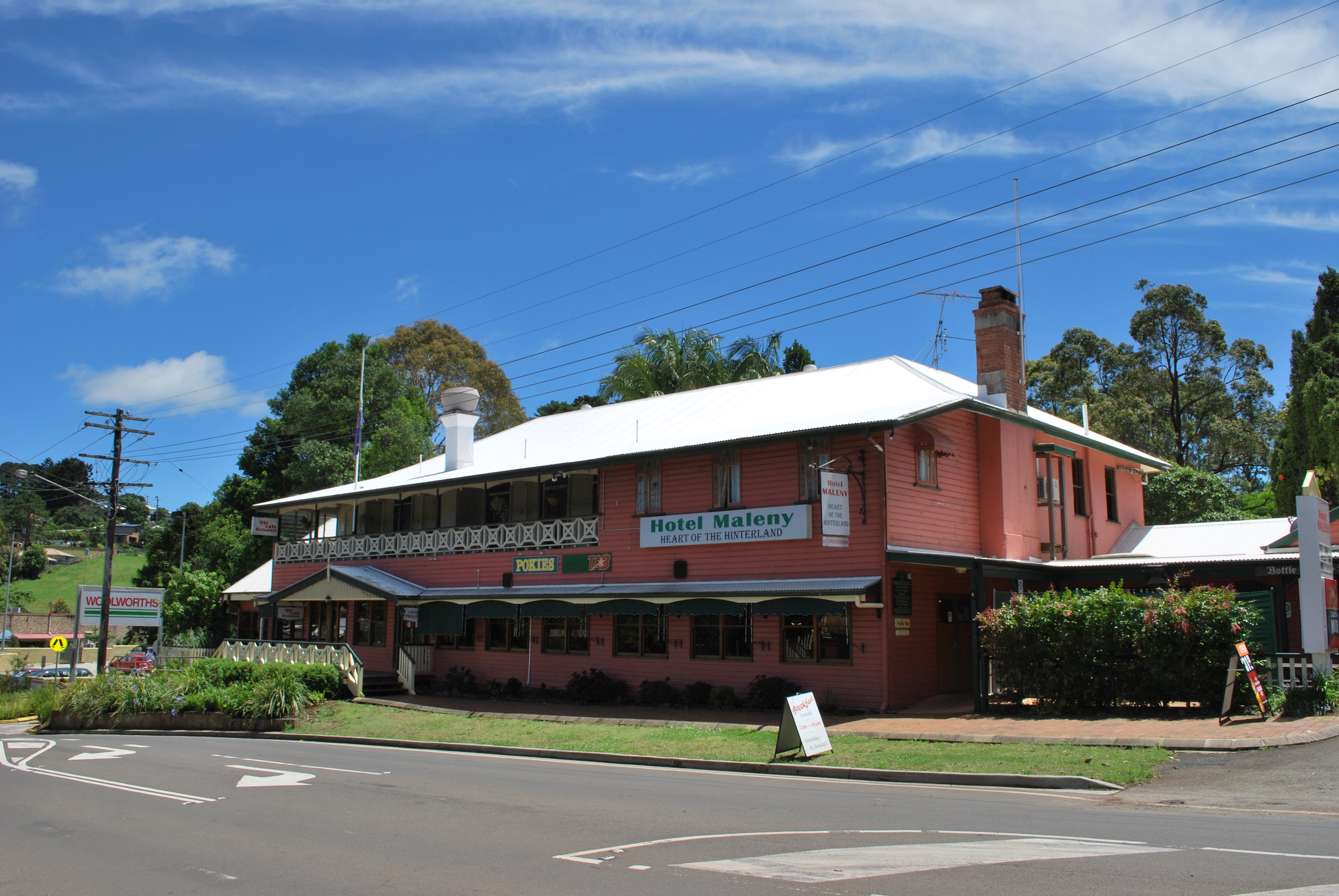
Hotel Maleny

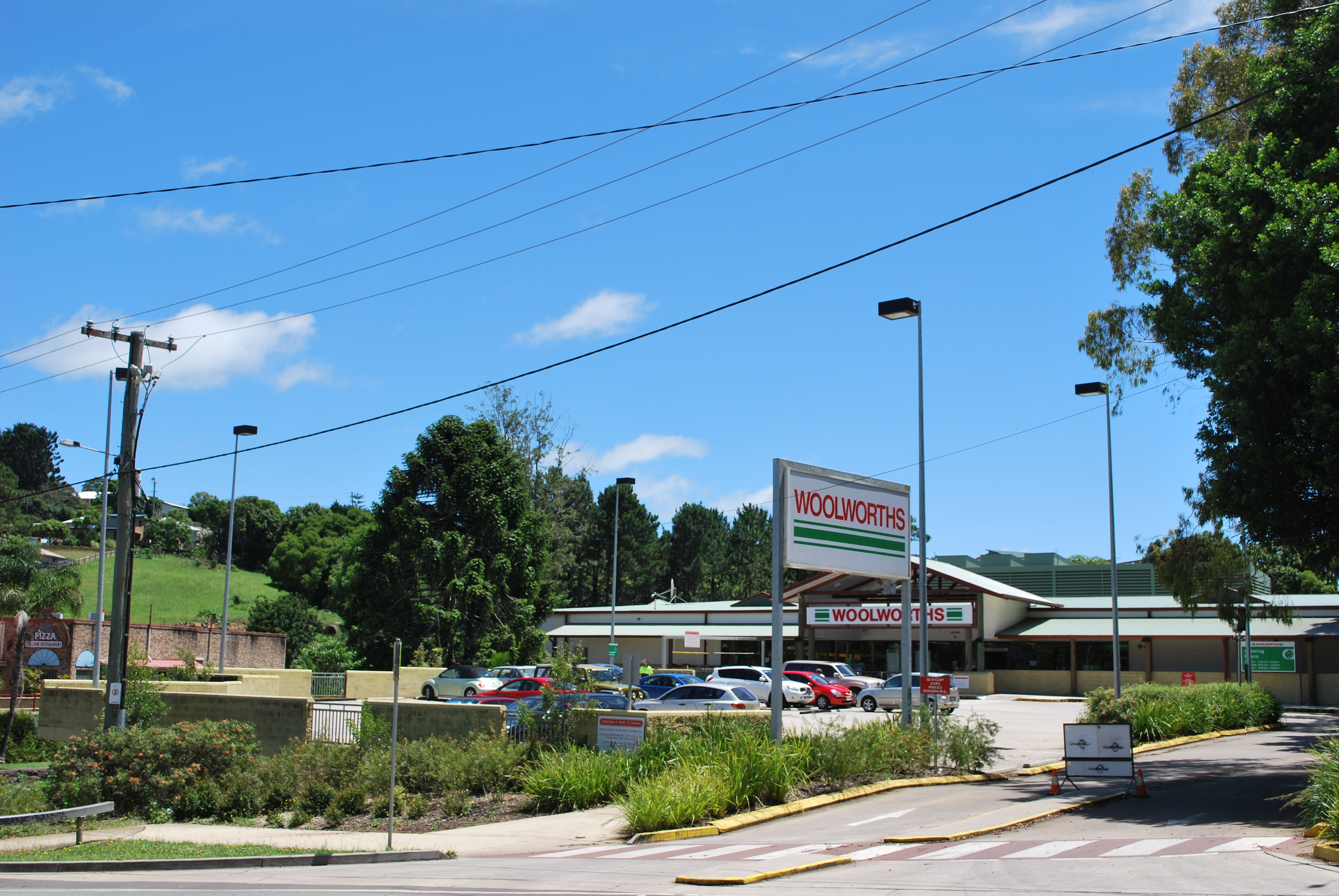
The controversial Woolworths supermarket at Maleny on the Obi Obi Creek

Maleny has replaced its timber-cutting and dairying past with tourism with a large influx of people who wanted an alternative lifestyle. As well as being on the Hinterland tourist drive, Maleny attracts daytrippers from Brisbane and the Sunshine Coast who are attracted to the various stores, art galleries and specialty shops.

Maleny is home to a large number of cooperative enterprises. There are art galleries, health food and organic produce stores, cafes, the Maleny Credit Union, a thriving business centre, rural settlements, a community golf course, alternative schools, alternative medical treatment centres, organic farms, intentional communities including the Crystal Waters Permaculture Village in nearby Conondale and the Fountainhead organic retreat and education centre.

== Education ==
Maleny State School is a government primary (Prep–6) school for boys and girls at 16 Bunya Street (26.7607°S 152.8553°E). In 2017, the school had an enrolment of 409 students with 32 teachers (27 full-time equivalent) and 23 non-teaching staff (14 full-time equivalent). The school offers a special education program.

Ananda Marga River School (also known as The River School) is a private primary (Prep–6) school for boys and girls at 251 Bridge Creek Road (26.7343°S 152.8447°E). In 2017, the school had an enrolment of 126 students with 14 teachers (10 full-time equivalent) and 17 non-teaching staff (10 full-time equivalent).

Maleny State High School is a government secondary (7–12) school for boys and girls at 50 Bunya Street (26.7657°S 152.8569°E). In 2017, the school had an enrolment of 705 students with 60 teachers (55 full-time equivalent) and 29 non-teaching staff (20 full-time equivalent). The school offers a special education program.

== Amenities ==
The Anglican parish of Maleny is part of the Anglican Diocese of Brisbane. Some of the parish's recent priests have been involved with the Progressive Christianity movement. The parish declares "We publicly support LGBTIQ+ people, celebrating their gifts and ministry among us".

There are also a number of Protestant churches in the town: the Maleny Presbyterian Church, Maleny Uniting Church, the Church on the Rise, Maleny Baptist Church, and Maleny Seventh Day Adventist Church.

The Sunshine Coast Council operate a library at 5 Coral Street which has a meeting room, wireless internet access, and access to a variety of books and periodicals. The library also conducts a number of public programs for community members of all ages. Plans to extend the Maleny Library are ongoing, as the library is the second smallest of the council's libraries but one of the busiest. The Sunshine Coast Libraries Plan 2014–2024 recommends reassessment of car parking provisions, the interior design of library spaces and opportunities to use alternate community spaces for library activities.

The Maleny branch of the Queensland Country Women's Association meets at 1 Bicentenary Lane.

== Attractions ==
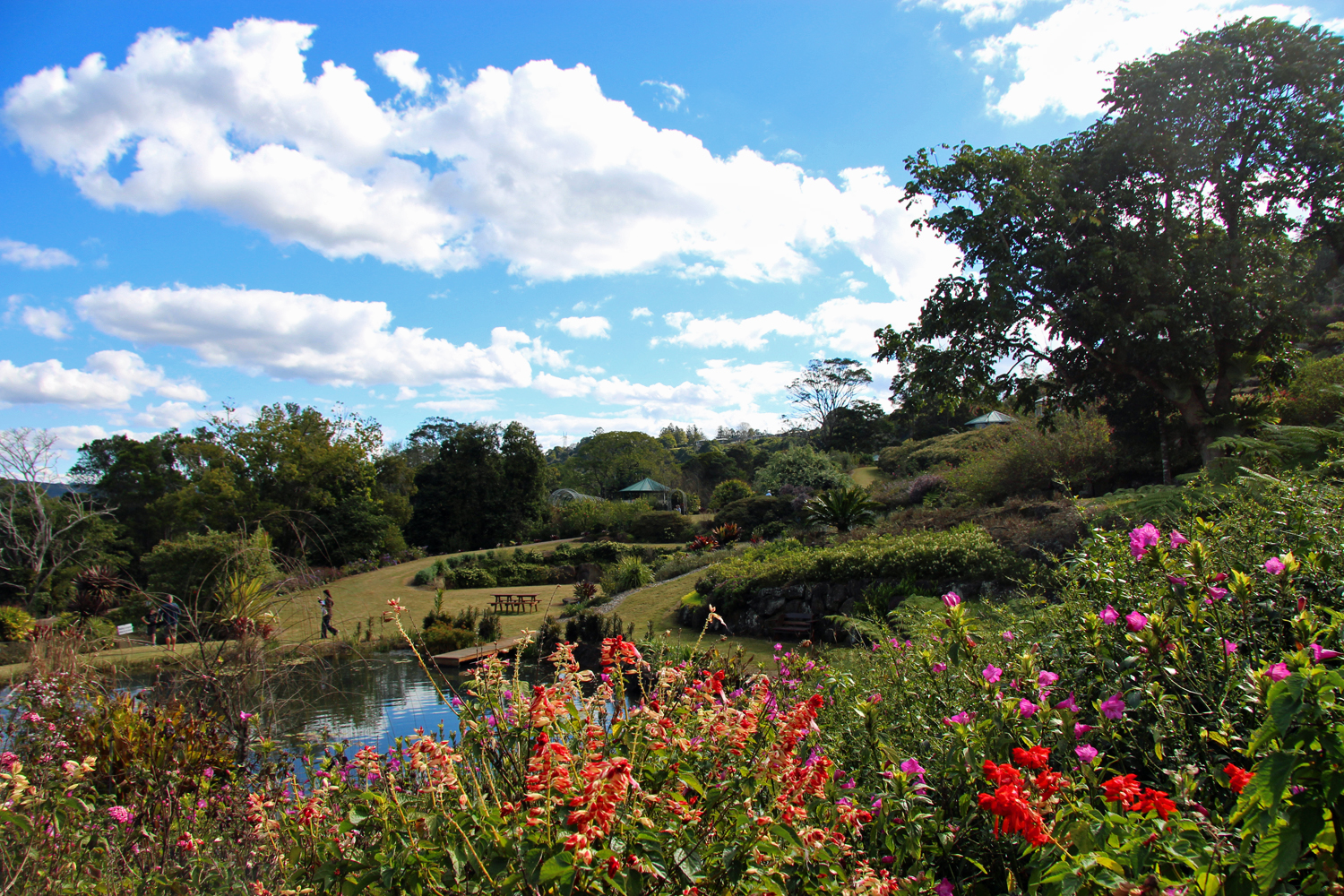
Maleny Botanic Gardens

McCarthy Lookout is at 563 Mountain View Road (26.7813°S 152.8420°E). It provides views of the Glasshouse Mountains.

Despite its name, Maleny Botanic Gardens and Bird World is at 233 Maleny Stanley River Road in neighbouring Wootha.

== Climate ==
Located on the humid eastern slopes of the Blackall Range, Maleny is one of the wettest towns in Queensland away from the north tropical coast. The average annual rainfall is about 2,000 mm (79 in); however, during unusually wet years twelve-month rainfall totals of up to 4,000 mm (160 in) can be recorded, with monthly totals over 1,000 mm (39 in) and 24-hour totals up to 300 mm (12 in). Temperatures are mild and rarely get above 35 °C (95 °F) in summer or drop below 5 °C (41 °F) in winter.

Climate data for Maleny
Month	Jan	Feb	Mar	Apr	May	Jun	Jul	Aug	Sep	Oct	Nov	Dec	Year
Record high °C (°F)	40.0 (104.0)	38.2 (100.8)	34.6 (94.3)	30.4 (86.7)	28.2 (82.8)	25.2 (77.4)	24.2 (75.6)	31.6 (88.9)	32.4 (90.3)	34.4 (93.9)	37.8 (100.0)	38.2 (100.8)	40.0 (104.0)
Mean daily maximum °C (°F)	26.7 (80.1)	26.3 (79.3)	25.1 (77.2)	23.5 (74.3)	21.1 (70.0)	18.9 (66.0)	18.8 (65.8)	20.2 (68.4)	22.7 (72.9)	24.2 (75.6)	24.9 (76.8)	26.8 (80.2)	23.2 (73.8)
Mean daily minimum °C (°F)	18.8 (65.8)	18.7 (65.7)	17.2 (63.0)	15.0 (59.0)	11.8 (53.2)	10.1 (50.2)	9.1 (48.4)	9.8 (49.6)	12.4 (54.3)	14.3 (57.7)	15.9 (60.6)	17.7 (63.9)	14.2 (57.6)
Record low °C (°F)	13.6 (56.5)	14.8 (58.6)	11.5 (52.7)	6.5 (43.7)	4.4 (39.9)	2.5 (36.5)	1.4 (34.5)	3.2 (37.8)	5.8 (42.4)	6.8 (44.2)	8.0 (46.4)	11.0 (51.8)	1.4 (34.5)
Average rainfall mm (inches)	288.3 (11.35)	319.5 (12.58)	289.2 (11.39)	193.2 (7.61)	141.7 (5.58)	108.0 (4.25)	89.2 (3.51)	62.9 (2.48)	64.0 (2.52)	109.0 (4.29)	137.4 (5.41)	198.4 (7.81)	2,000.8 (78.78)
Average rainy days (≥ 0.2mm)	14.2	15.2	16.2	12.1	10.4	8.1	7.6	6.2	7.1	9.3	10.5	12.0	128.9
Source: Bureau of Meteorology

== Notable natives ==
- Mike Ahern, Queensland National Party politician who was Premier of Queensland from December 1987 to September 1989.

== See also ==
- Blackall Range road network
