= Shire of Kilcoy =

Coordinates: 26°56′29.4″S 152°33′50.3″E

- Local government area
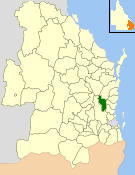
- Location within Queensland

- Country: Australia
- State: Queensland
- Region: South East Queensland
- Established: 1912
- Council seat: Kilcoy

Area
  - Total: 1,445.2 km^{2} (558.0 sq mi)

Population
  - Total: 3,424 (2006 census)
  - Density: 2.3692/km^{2} (6.1363/sq mi)
- Website: Shire of Kilcoy
LGAs around Shire of Kilcoy
Kilkivan	Cooloola	Cooloola
Esk	Shire of Kilcoy	Maroochy, Caloundra
Esk	Esk	Caboolture

The Shire of Kilcoy was a local government area in South East Queensland, Australia, about 95 kilometres (59 mi) northwest of Brisbane along the D'Aguilar Highway, not far from the Sunshine Coast. The shire covered an area of 1,445.2 square kilometres (558.0 sq mi), and existed from 1912 until its merger with the Shire of Esk to form the Somerset Region on 15 March 2008.

Beef cattle is the predominant industry in the area, with other activities including dairying, small crops and aquaculture.

== History ==
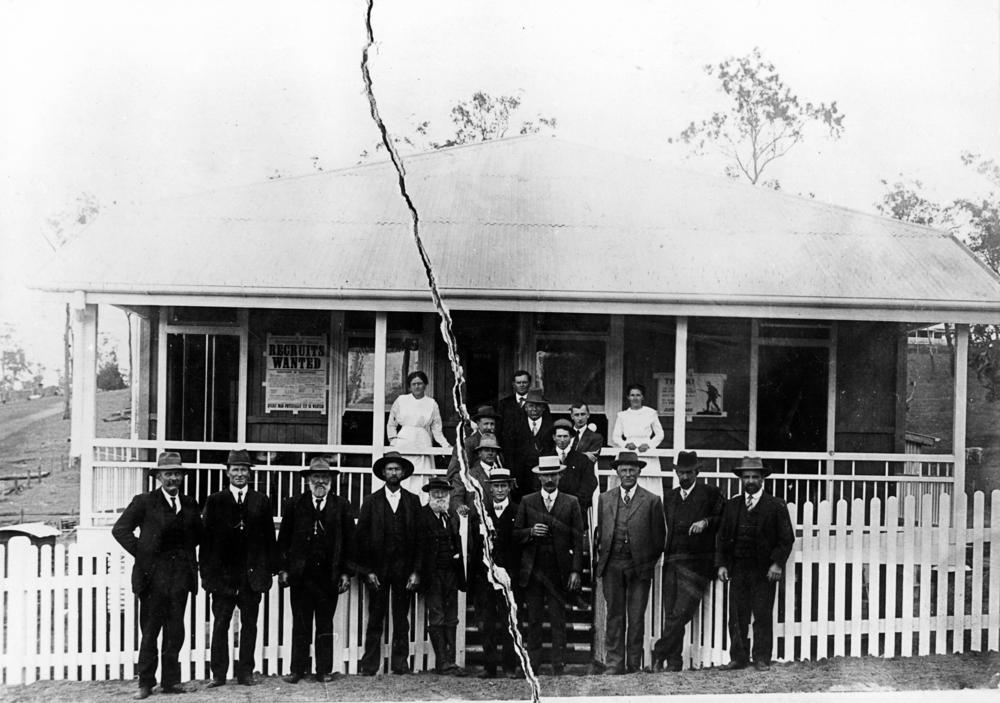
Kilcoy Shire Chambers, circa 1916

The area was originally incorporated as part of the Caboolture Division on 11 November 1879 under the Divisional Boards Act 1879. With the passage of the Local Authorities Act 1902, Caboolture became a Shire on 31 March 1903.

On 22 February 1912, the Shire of Kilcoy split away and was proclaimed in its own right. The council consisted of an elected mayor and eight councillors, and was not subdivided.

On 15 March 2008, under the Local Government (Reform Implementation) Act 2007 passed by the Parliament of Queensland on 10 August 2007, the Shire of Kilcoy merged with the Shire of Esk to form the Somerset Region.

== Towns and localities ==
The Shire of Kilcoy included the following settlements:

- Kilcoy
- Glenfern
- Hazeldean
- Jimna
- Monsildale
- Villeneuve
- Winya
- Yabba
- Yendina

== Population ==
Year	Population
1933	2,220
1947	2,551
1954	2,473
1961	2,406
1966	2,343
1971	2,149
1976	2,223
1981	2,186
1986	2,577
1991	2,951
1996	3,139
2001	3,244
2006	3,424

== Chairmen and mayors ==
- 1927: R. C. Jenkinson
- 1985–2000: Alex Brown
- 2000–2008: Terry Dredge
