= Mount Archer, Queensland (Somerset Region) =

Mount Archer
- Suburb
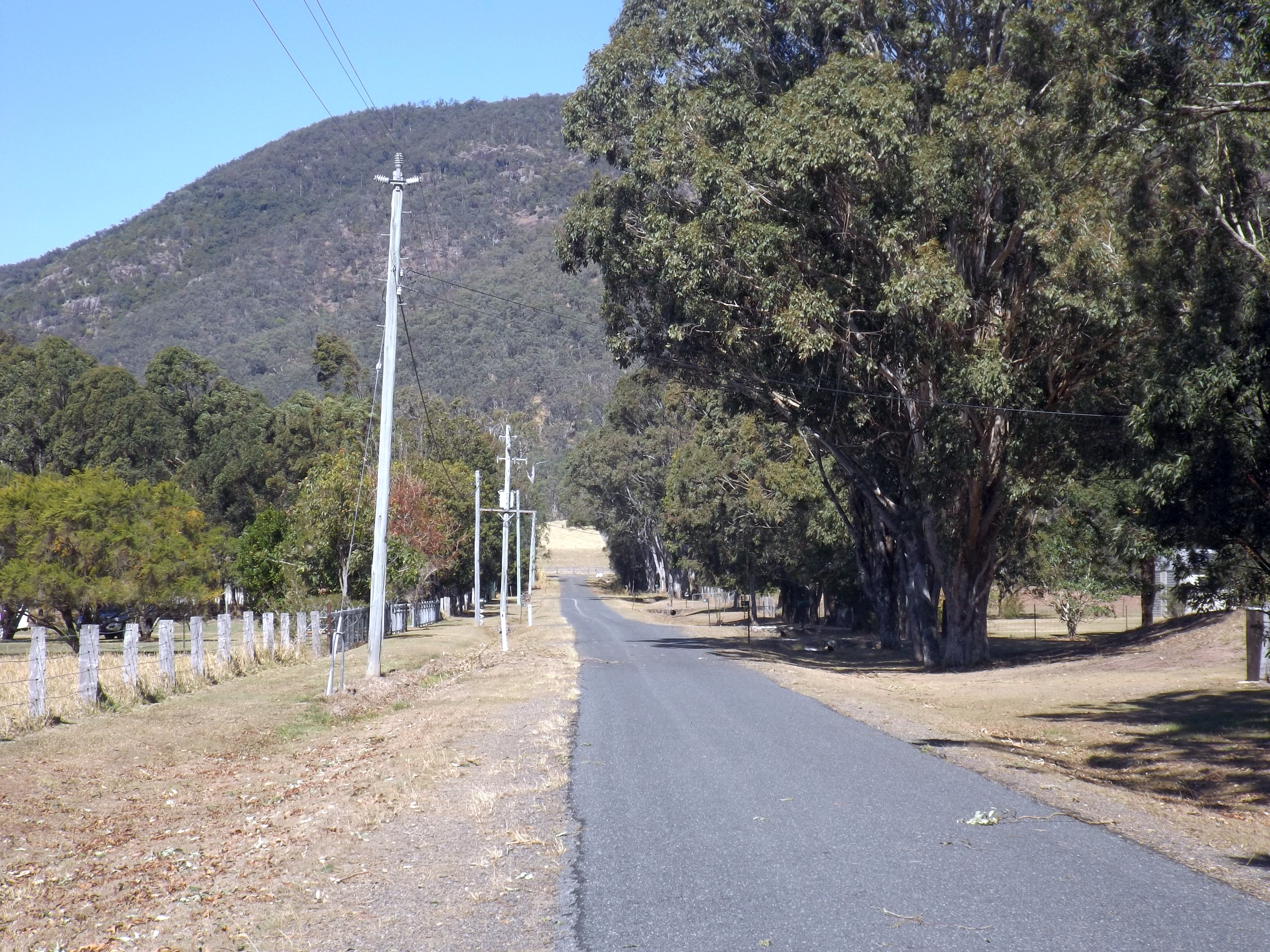
- Doyles Road, 2015

- Interactive map of Mount Archer
- Coordinates: 26.9911°S 152.6647°E
- Country: Australia
- State: Queensland
- LGA: Somerset Region
- Location: 12.3 km (7.6 mi) ESE of Kilcoy; 14.1 km (8.8 mi) W of Woodford; 46.4 km (28.8 mi) NW of Caboolture; 62.7 km (39.0 mi) NE of Esk; 91.1 km (56.6 mi) NNW of Brisbane

Government
  - State electorate: Nanango
  - Federal division: Blair

Area
  - Total: 50.6 km^{2} (19.5 sq mi)

Population
  - Total: 331 (2021 census)
  - Density: 6.542/km^{2} (16.94/sq mi)
- Time zone: UTC+10:00 (AEST)
- Postcode: 4514
Suburbs around Mount Archer
Villeneuve	Neurum	Neurum
Glenfern; Westvale	Mount Archer	Mount Delaney
Westvale	Mount Byron	Mount Mee

Mount Archer is a mountain and a rural locality in the Somerset Region, Queensland, Australia. In the 2021 census, Mount Archer had a population of 331 people.

== Geography ==
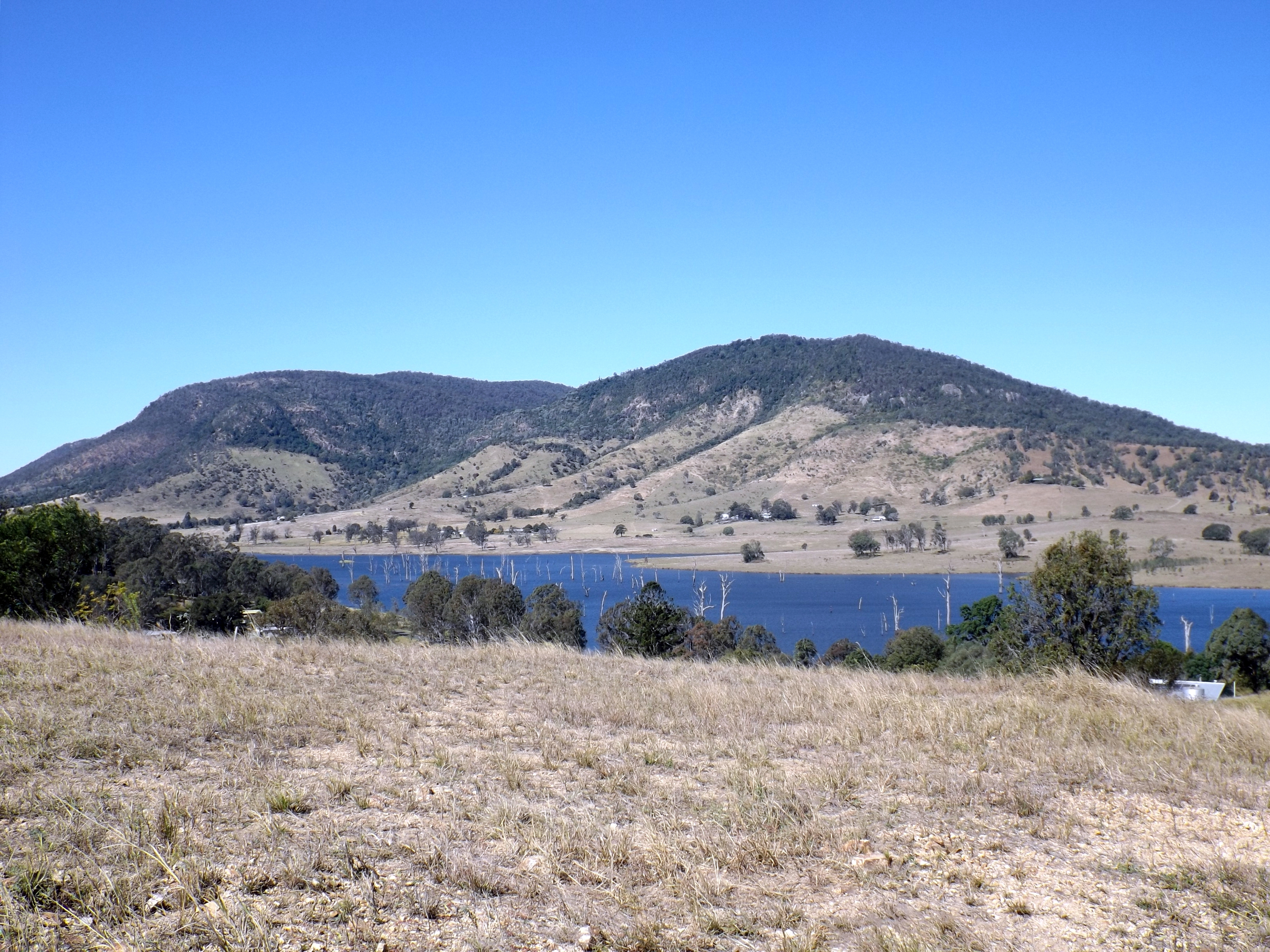
Mount Archer and Somerset Dam as seen from Villeneuve, 2015

Part of the northern boundary to the east is aligned with Neurum Creek, while in the west it roughly follows the Stanley River.

In the northwest of Mount Archer is a section of Somerset Dam. The north-eastern part has some rural residential and farming properties. The south of the locality is mountainous and heavily vegetated with parts protected within D'Aguilar National Park. This includes the peak of Mount Archer which marks the northern extent of the D'Aguilar Range.

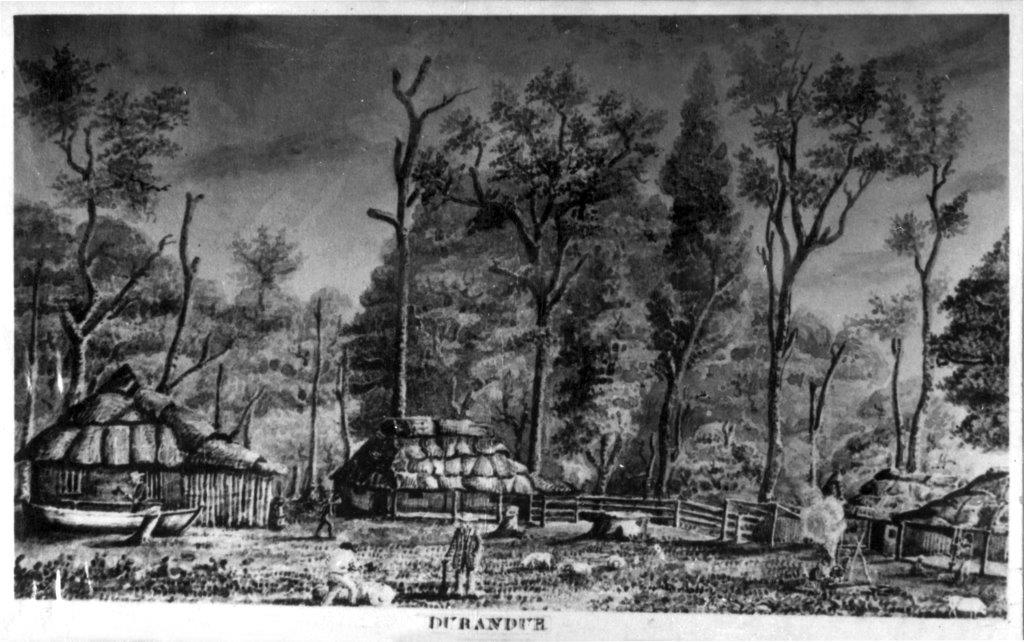
Sketch of Durundur Station by Charles Archer, 1843

== History ==
The mountain is called Buruja in the Kabi language. It means door.

The locality of Mount Archer takes its name from the mountain Mount Archer which in turn is named after three of the pioneer Archer brothers (John, David, and Thomas) who established the Durundur Station in the area.

== Demographics ==
At the 2011 census the population of Mount Archer was included in the population statistics for the adjoining locality of Villeneuve, which recorded a population of 449.

In the 2016 census, Mount Archer had a population of 305 people.

In the 2021 census, Mount Archer had a population of 331 people.

== Education ==
There are no schools in Mount Archer. The nearest government primary schools are Kilcoy State School in Kilcoy to the north-west, Woodford State School in Woodford to the north-east, and Mount Mee State School in neighbouring Mount Mee. The nearest government secondary schools are Kilcoy State High School (to Year 12) in Kilcoy and Woodford State School (to Year 10) in Woodford.
