= Glenfern, Queensland =

Glenfern
- Suburb
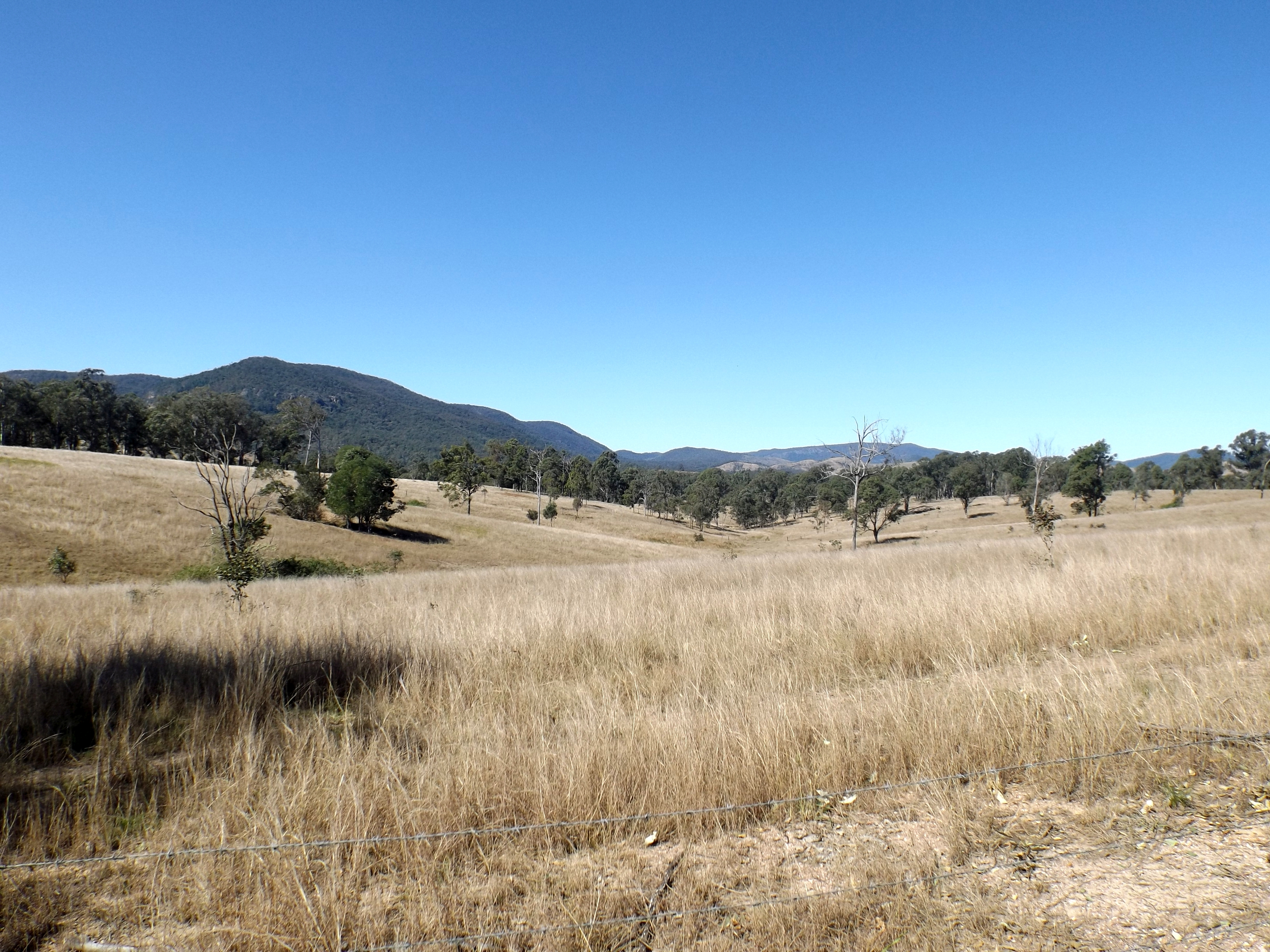
- Fields along Runges Road, 2015

- Interactive map of Glenfern
- Coordinates: 26.9663°S 152.6066°E
- Country: Australia
- State: Queensland
- LGA: Somerset Region
- Location: 6.9 km (4.3 mi) E of Kilcoy; 57.3 km (35.6 mi) NNE of Esk; 98.6 km (61.3 mi) NNW of Brisbane CBD

Government
  - State electorate: Nanango
  - Federal division: Blair

Area
  - Total: 14.1 km^{2} (5.4 sq mi)

Population
  - Total: 11 (2021 census)
  - Density: 0.78/km^{2} (2.02/sq mi)
- Time zone: UTC+10:00 (AEST)
- Postcode: 4515
Suburbs around Glenfern
Winya	Sandy Creek	Villeneuve
Winya	Glenfern	Mount Archer
Winya	Westvale	Westvale

Glenfern is a rural locality in the Somerset Region, Queensland, Australia. In the 2021 census, Glenfern had a population of 11 people.

== Geography ==
The D'Aguilar Highway marks a section of the northern boundary. The southern boundary is roughly aligned with the Stanley River, however when the Somerset Dam is full, the dam's waters cover Glenfern's southern extent. Sandy Creek flows from the north into the dam in this area (26.9723°S 152.5831°E) and forms the north-eastern boundary of the locality. The land is used for farming.

== History ==
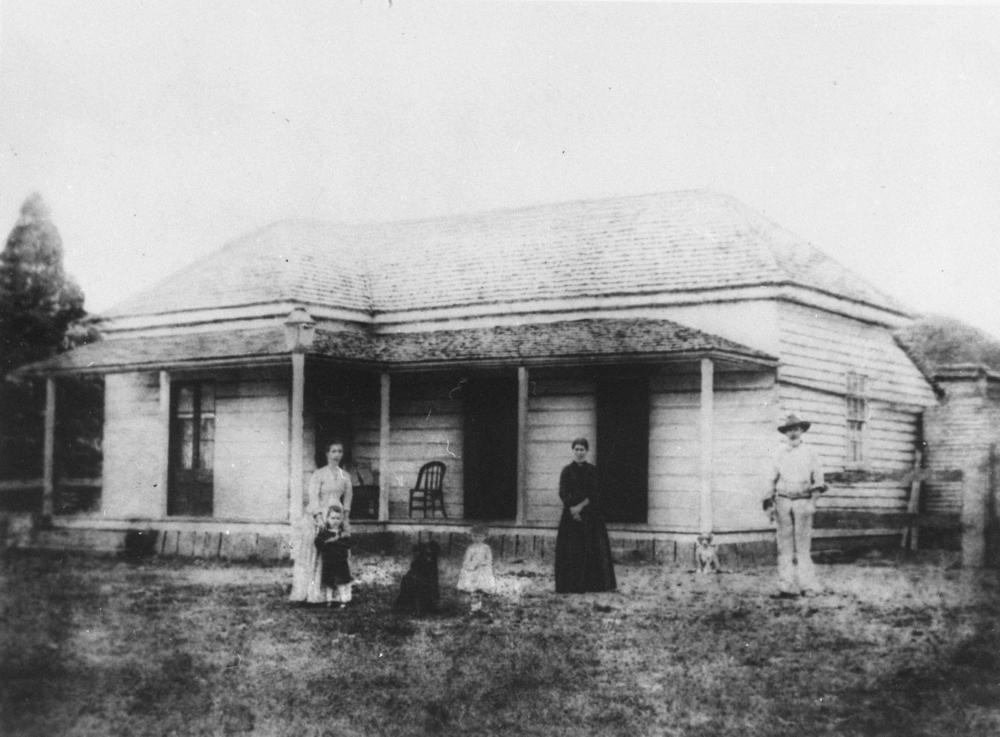
Alexander McPherson and his family outside the Glenfern Hotel, 1878

In January 1880, Alexander McPherson obtained a country publican's licence to operate the Glenfern Hotel. The Glenfern Hotel was located 3 miles (4.8 km) east of Kilcoy on the road to Woodford (now the D'Aguilar Highway). In 1884, McPherson died from a fall from his horse; his wife Eliza (née Webb) continued to operate the hotel, being described in 1886 as "by no means a pretentious-looking place, but it was scrupulously clean". In 1889, Eliza McPherson married John Young who became the licensee. In 1890, the annual Kilcoy horse races were held in the hotel grounds. The hotel operated until at least 1913 but by 1923 was in use as the private home of Amelia Raleigh (one of the McPherson daughters). The hotel no longer exists, but is likely to be the origin of the locality name.

In 1913, the Kilcoy railway line was constructed with Glenfern railway station (26.9538°S 152.6058°E) serving the area. The railway line and the station closed in 1964.

== Demographics ==
In the 2012 census, the population of Glenfern was very low so it was included in the population statistics for the adjoining locality of Velleneuve, which recorded a population of 449.

In the 2016 census, Glenfern had a population of 10 people.

In the 2021 census, Glenfern had a population of 11 people.

== Education ==
There are no schools in Glenfern. The nearest government primary school is Kilcoy State School in Kilcoy to the west. The nearest government secondary school is Kilcoy State High School, also in Kilcoy.

== Kilcoy Motorcycle Club ==
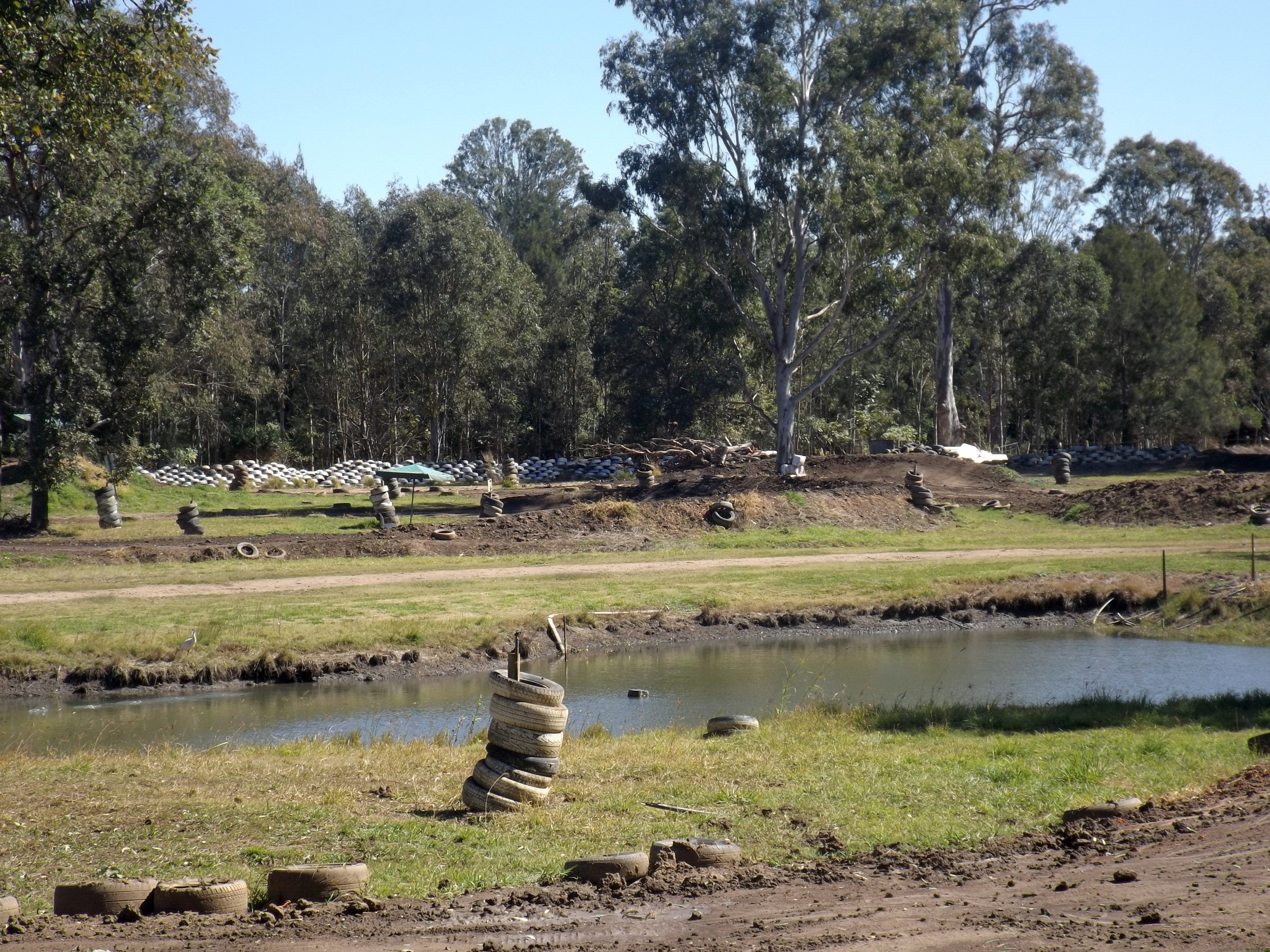
Kilcoy Motorcycle Club, 2015

The Kilcoy Motorcycle Club leases a park on the western corner of Neurum Road and Runges Road (26.959165°S 152.607760°E) from the Somerset Regional Council. The club has developed an off-road motocross course on which it runs competitions and practice and coaching days. Facilities include spectator grandstands, canteen and bar, and showers. The club competes in the Sunshine State Series and the South East Queensland Junior Series. The club hosts the annual Ironman Competition.
