= Sandy Creek, Queensland =

Sandy Creek
- Suburb
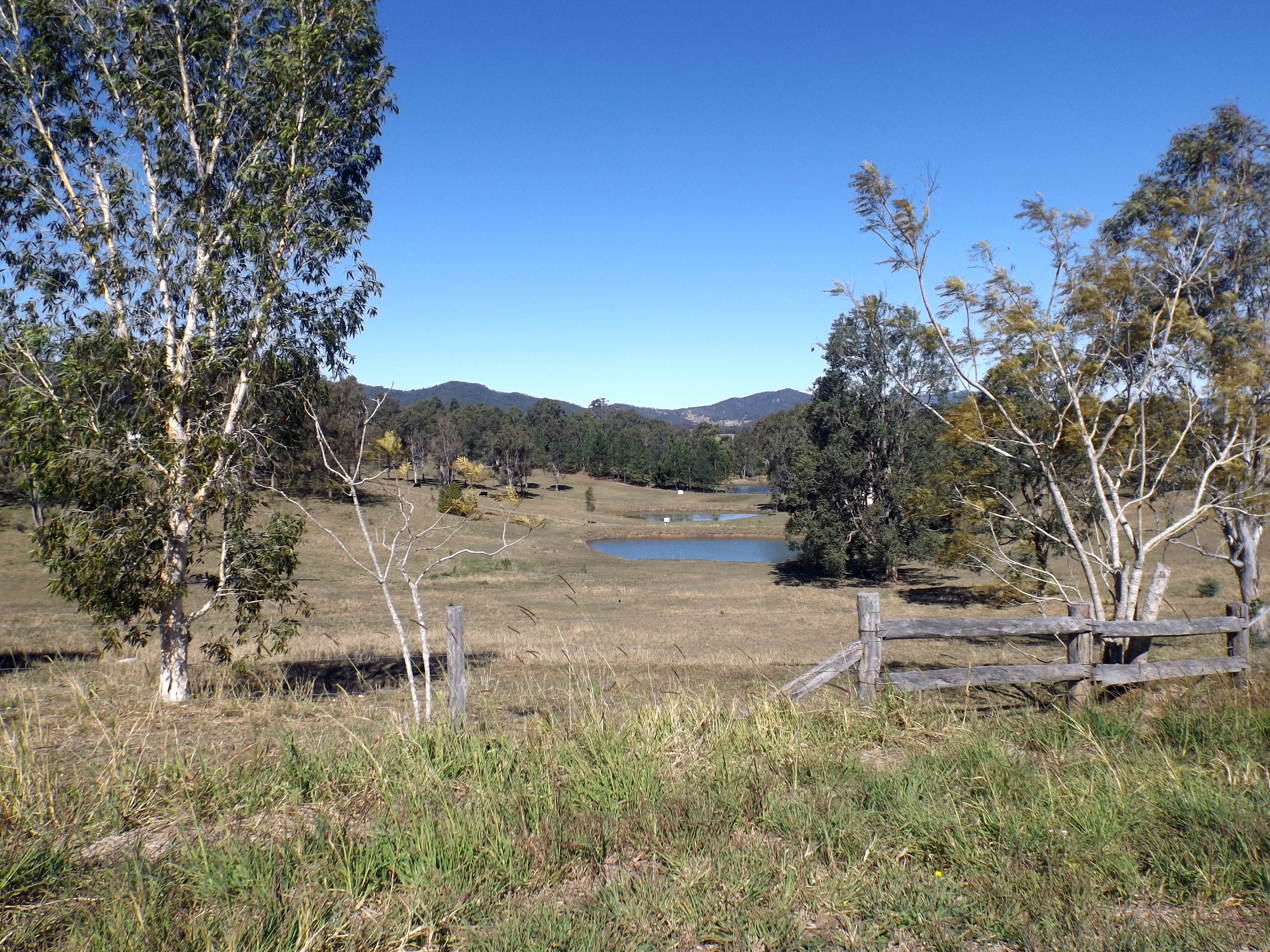
- Paddocks along Sandy Creek Road, 2015

- Interactive map of Sandy Creek
- Coordinates: 26.8516°S 152.6427°E
- Country: Australia
- State: Queensland
- LGA: Somerset Region
- Location: 9.4 km (5.8 mi) NE of Kilcoy; 61.0 km (37.9 mi) NE of Esk; 91.8 km (57.0 mi) NNW of Brisbane

Government
  - State electorate: Nanango
  - Federal division: Blair

Area
  - Total: 106.8 km^{2} (41.2 sq mi)

Population
  - Total: 593 (2021 census)
  - Density: 5.552/km^{2} (14.381/sq mi)
- Time zone: UTC+10:00 (AEST)
- Postcode: 4515
Suburbs around Sandy Creek
Jimna	Jimna	Conondale
Mount Kilcoy	Sandy Creek	Bellthorpe; Stony Creek
Winya	Glenfern; Villeneuve	Royston

Sandy Creek is a rural locality in the Somerset Region, Queensland, Australia. In the 2021 census, Sandy Creek had a population of 593 people.

== Geography ==
Sandy Creek is located northeast of Kilcoy in South East Queensland.

Many parts of Sandy Creek are elevated along the southern Conondale Range and some of the range is protected within Bellthorpe National Park.

The locality has the following mountains:

- Mount Ann (26.9116°S 152.5993°E) in the south-west of the locality, rising to 255 metres (837 ft)
- Mount Marysmokes (26.8699°S 152.6649°E) in the east of the locality, rising to 657 metres (2,156 ft)

== History ==
Winya State School opened in 1918 and closed in 1960. The school was on a 5-acre (2.0 ha) site on the north-east corner of the D'Aguilar Highway and Sandy Creek Road (26.9293°S 152.6073°E) now within the locality of Sandy Creek.

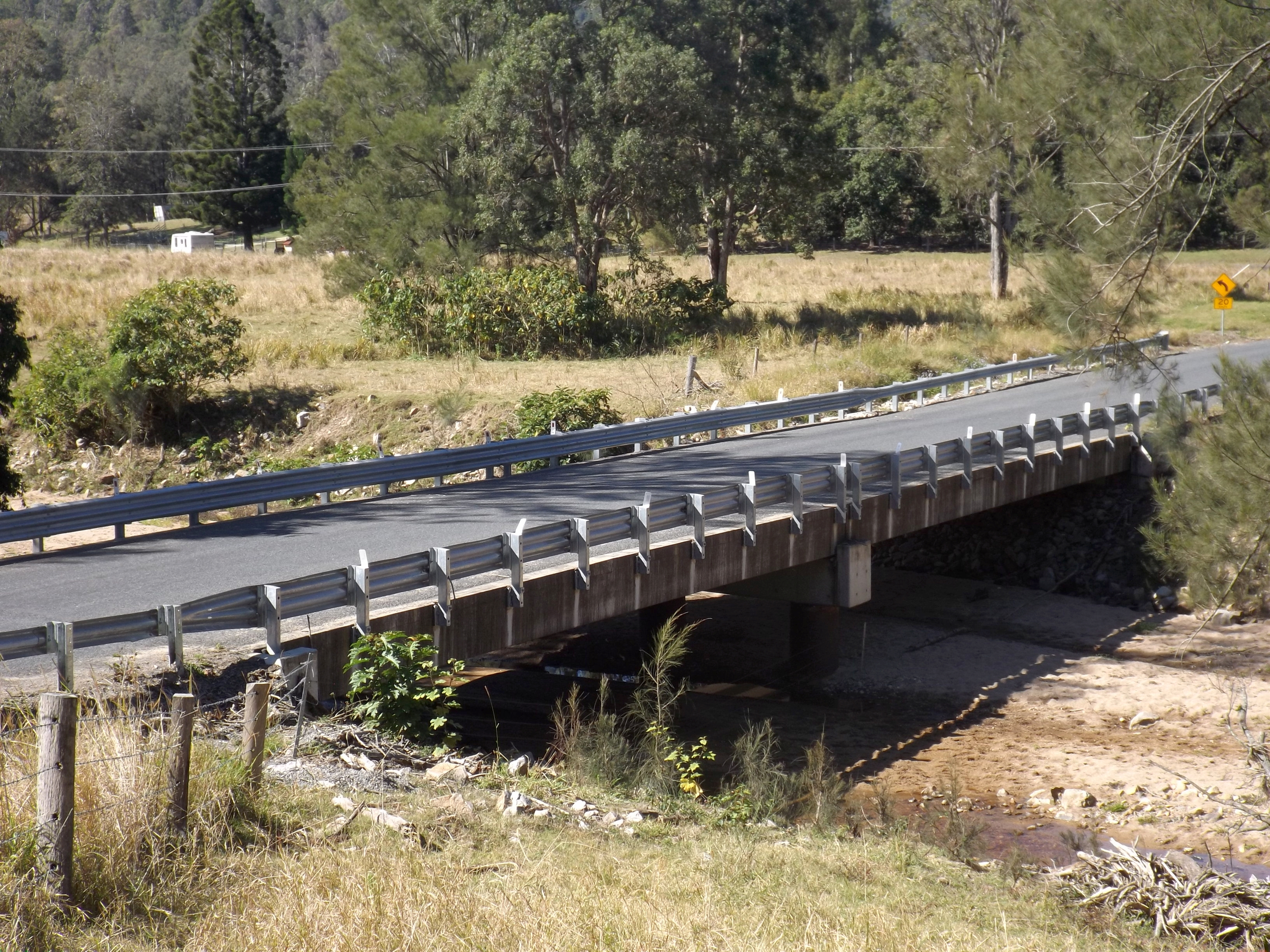
Hubners Bridge, 2015

Hubners Bridge, also known as Hubner Bridge, is a road bridge on the Sandy Creek Road over Sandy Creek (26.8537°S 152.626642°E). The bridge was washed away on 9 January 2011 during the catastrophic 2010–2011 floods. A flying-fox was built across Sandy Creek to provide supplies to residents stranded due to bridge damage. It has been rebuilt since then and was re-opened on 6 April 2012.

== Demographics ==
In the 2011 census, Sandy Creek had a population of 555 people.

In the 2016 census, Sandy Creek had a population of 567 people.

In the 2021 census, Sandy Creek had a population of 593 people.

== Education ==
There are no schools in Sandy Creek. The nearest government primary schools are Mount Kilcoy State School in neighbouring Mount Kilcoy to the west and Kilcoy State School in Kilcoy to the south-west. The nearest government secondary school is Kilcoy State High School in Kilcoy.
