= Westvale, Queensland =

Westvale
- Suburb
- Interactive map of Westvale
- Coordinates: 27.0302°S 152.6144°E
- Country: Australia
- State: Queensland
- LGA: Somerset Region
- Location: 25.7 km (16.0 mi) SE of Kilcoy; 77.3 km (48.0 mi) NE of Esk; 119 km (74 mi) NNW of Brisbane

Government
  - State electorate: Nanango
  - Federal division: Blair

Area
  - Total: 70.3 km^{2} (27.1 sq mi)

Population
  - Total: 0 (2021 census)
  - Density: 0.000/km^{2} (0.000/sq mi)
- Time zone: UTC+10:00 (AEST)
- Postcode: 4514
Suburbs around Westvale
Winya	Glenfern	Mount Archer
Hazeldean	Westvale	Mount Archer
Hazeldean	Crossdale	Mount Byron

Westvale is a rural locality in the Somerset Region, Queensland, Australia. In the 2021 census, Westvale had "no people or a very low population".

== Geography ==
The locality is bounded on the west by Lake Somerset, the impoundment created on the Stanley River by the Somerset Dam. The creeks in the locality all contribute to the Stanley River.

The terrain is quite mountainous, rising from 100 metres (330 ft) above sea level at the lake to a number of unnamed peaks rising to 420 metres (1,380 ft). Some of the southern part of the locality is within the D'Aguilar National Park (which extends into neighbouring Mount Archer and Mount Bryon.

Apart from the national park, the predominant land use is grazing on native vegetation.

== History ==
Villeneuve Provisional School opened on 30 May 1887. About 1894, the school was physically relocated to Westvale. In 1902, it was renamed West Vale Provisional School. Due to low student numbers it closed in September 1907 but reopened in July 1908. It closed permanently in 1910.

== Demographics ==
In the 2016 census, Westvale had "no people or a very low population".

In the 2021 census, Westvale had "no people or a very low population".

== Education ==
There are no schools in the locality. The nearest government primary schools are Kilcoy State School in Kilcoy to the north-west and Mount Mee State School in Mount Mee to the south-east. The nearest government secondary schools are Kilcoy State High School (to Year 12) in Kilcoy to the north-west, Toogoolawah State High School (to Year 12) in Toogoolawah to the south-west, and Woodford State School (to Year 10) in Woodford to the north-east.
