= Royston, Queensland =

Royston
- Suburb
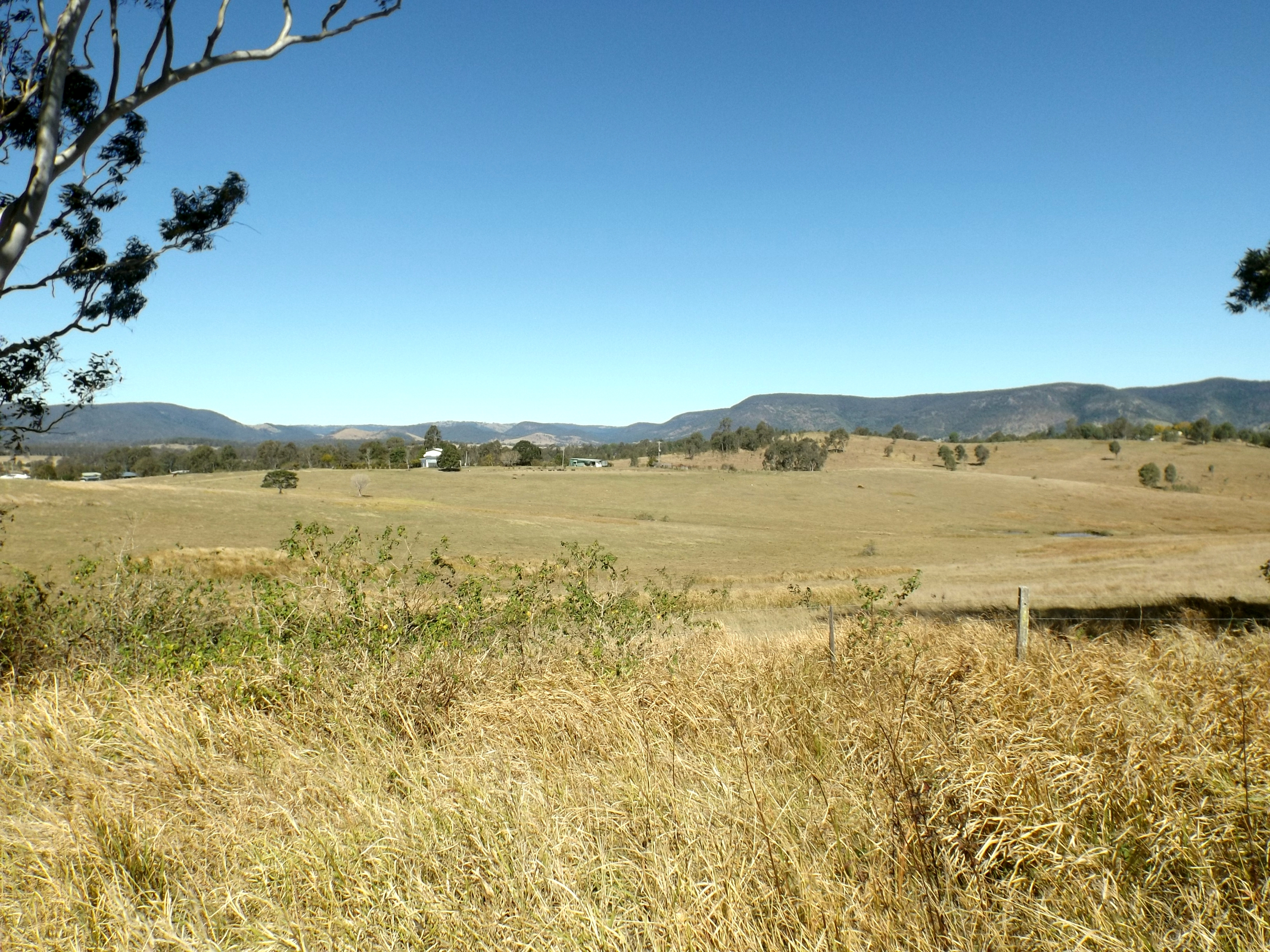
- Paddocks, 2015

- Interactive map of Royston
- Coordinates: 26.9230°S 152.6502°E
- Country: Australia
- State: Queensland
- LGA: Somerset Region
- Location: 12.5 km (7.8 mi) E of Kilcoy; 13.3 km (8.3 mi) W of Woodford; 64.1 km (39.8 mi) NE of Esk; 86.8 km (53.9 mi) NNW of Brisbane

Government
  - State electorate: Nanango
  - Federal division: Blair

Area
  - Total: 19.2 km^{2} (7.4 sq mi)

Population
  - Total: 346 (2021 census)
  - Density: 18.02/km^{2} (46.67/sq mi)
- Time zone: UTC+10:00 (AEST)
- Postcode: 4515
Suburbs around Royston
Sandy Creek	Sandy Creek	Stony Creek
Sandy Creek	Royston	Stony Creek
Neurum	Villeneuve	Villeneuve

Royston is a rural locality in the Somerset Region, Queensland, Australia. In the 2021 census, Royston had a population of 346 people.

== Geography ==
The D'Aguilar Highway passes through the south of Royston where the Stanley River marks the southern boundary. In the north lies the southern foothills of the Conondale Range.

== History ==
The locality takes its name from a former railway station, which in turn was named after the freehold property of grazier William Butler.

== Demographics ==
In the 2011 census, the locality had a population of 320 people.

In the 2016 census, Royston had a population of 336 people.

In the 2021 census, Royston had a population of 346 people.

== Education ==
There are no schools in Royston. The nearest government primary schools are Kilcoy State School in Kilcoy to the west and Mount Kilcoy State School in Mount Kilcoy to north-west. The nearest government secondary school is Kilcoy State High School in Kilcoy.

== See also ==
- List of tramways in Queensland
