= Kilcoy railway line =

Former railway line in Queensland

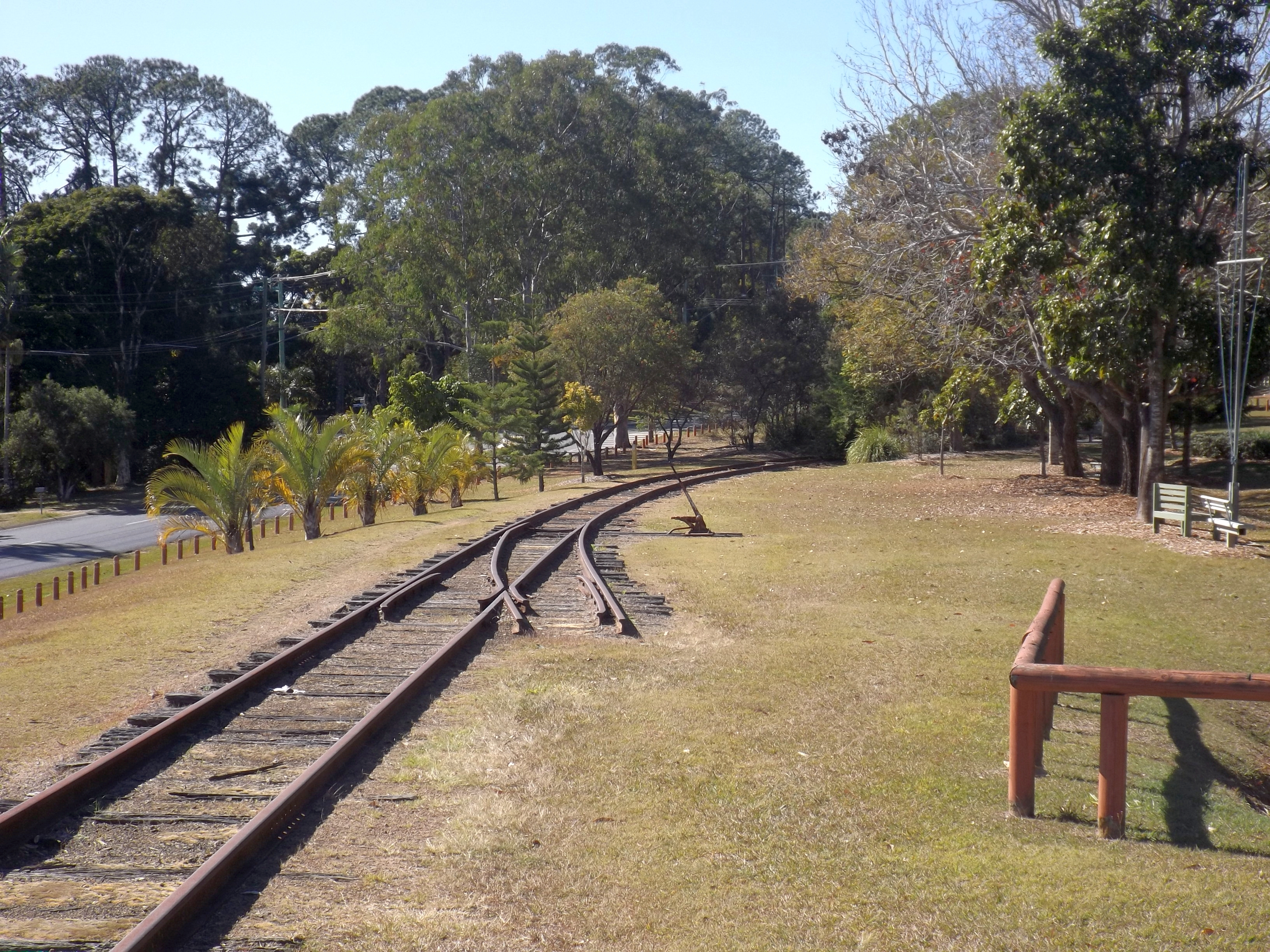
- Disused track at Wamuran, 2015

Overview
- Status: Closed
- Owner: Queensland Rail
- Locale: Queensland
- Termini: Caboolture; Kilcoy
- Continues from: North Coast line

Service
- Operator(s): Queensland Rail

History
- Opened: Caboolture-Woodford: 6 December 1909; Woodford-Kilcoy: 22 December 1913
- Closed: Wamuran-Kilcoy: 30 June 1964; Caboolture-Wamuran: 9 September 1996

Technical
- Line length: 55.9 km (34.7 mi)
- Track gauge: 1,067 mm (3 ft 6 in)

The Kilcoy railway line is a disused, partly demolished narrow gauge railway in South East Queensland, Australia.

== History ==
The first section of the line opened from Caboolture to Woodford on 6 December 1909. It was extended to Kilcoy on 22 December 1913.

Railway stations on the Kilcoy line included Durundur, Neurum, Royston, Villeneuve, Glenfern and Winya. The Wamuran to Kilcoy section closed on 30 June 1964 followed by the remaining section from Caboolture to Wamuran on 9 September 1996. As of 2015, all of the line has been removed back to Caboolture, except for a few hundred metres of track at the former Wamuran station.

== Caboolture to Wamuran Rail Trail ==
In May 2016, the Moreton Bay Regional Council published a concept plan for the development of a rail trail on the railway alignment from Caboolture to Wamuran.

This rail trail has been refurbished with a 10.5 km accessible sealed surface and completed in stages, with the trail officially opened on 15 December 2020.

The trail is easily accessed from Caboolture railway station by foot and wheeled vehicles. The trail also has information panels about the history of the Kilcoy line and the community and industries it served, beside the shelters and water refill stations at both the Caboolture start and Wamuran finish points.

== Museum and heritage railway ==
The Australian Narrow Gauge Railway Museum Society operates a railway museum at the Woodford railway station. The society was established in January 1971 to preserve the history of narrow-gauge railways in Queensland. The society has collected steam, diesel and petrol locomotives and rollingstock using the 2-foot gauge and has established their Durundur railway at Woodford as an operating heritage line.

== See also ==
- Construction of Queensland railways
- Rail transport in Queensland
