= Neurum, Queensland =

Neurum Queensland
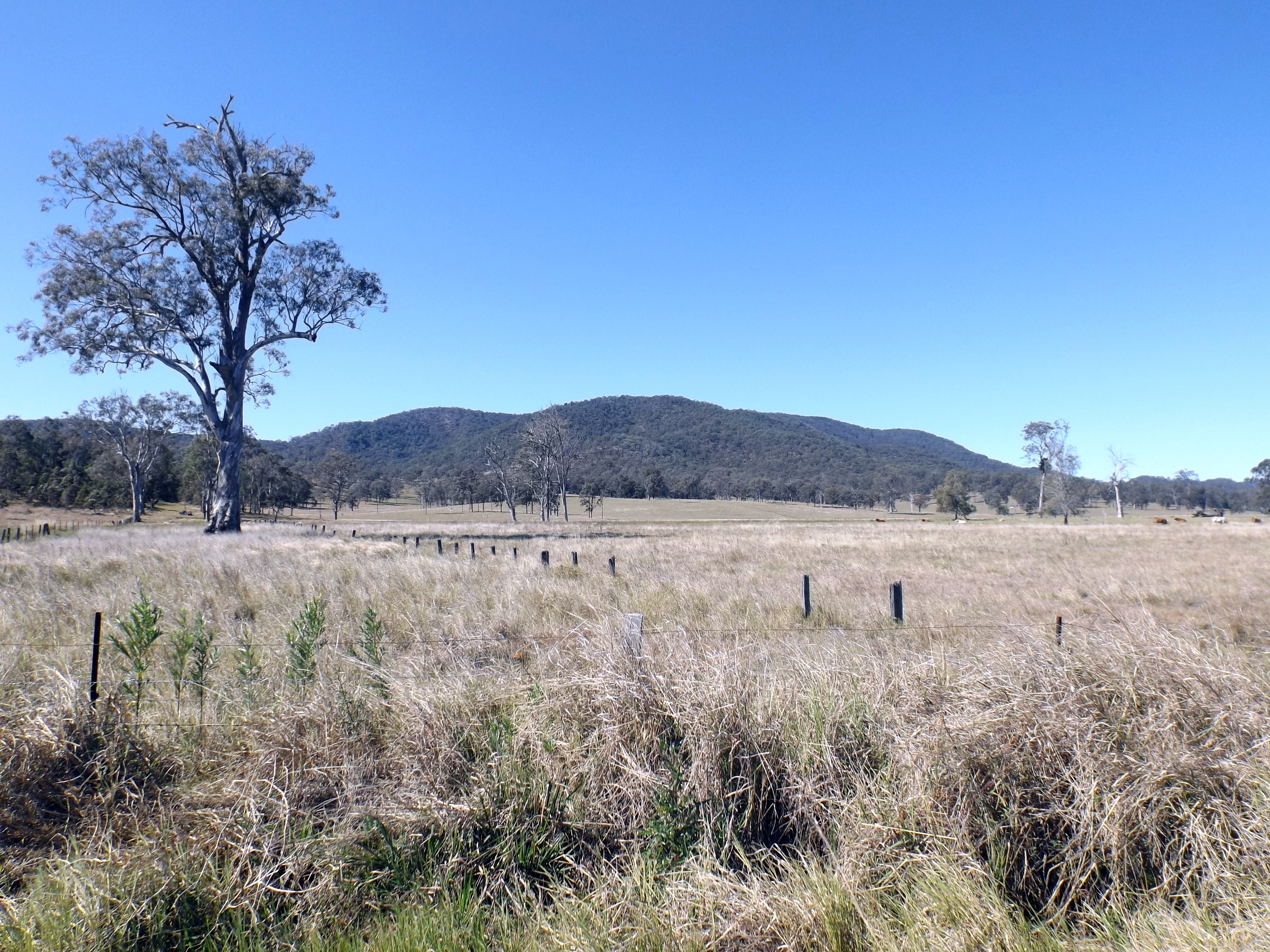
- Neurum Mountain and fields along Stanton Road, 2015

- Coordinates: 26.9611°S 152.6986°E
- Population: 178 (2021 census)
  - Density: 5.057/km^{2} (13.10/sq mi)
- Postcode(s): 4514
- Area: 35.2 km^{2} (13.6 sq mi)
- Time zone: AEST (UTC+10:00)
- Location: 9.7 km (6 mi) W of Woodford; 15.5 km (10 mi) ESE of Kilcoy; 35.0 km (22 mi) NW of Caboolture; 86.5 km (54 mi) NNW of Brisbane CBD
- LGA(s): City of Moreton Bay
- State electorate(s): Pumicestone
- Federal division(s): Longman
Localities around Neurum:
| Royston | Stony Creek | Woodford |
| Villeneuve | Neurum | Woodford |
| Mount Archer | Mount Delaney | Delaneys Creek |

Neurum is a rural town and locality in the City of Moreton Bay, Queensland, Australia. In the 2021 census, the locality of Neurum had a population of 178 people.

== Geography ==
The Stanley River is the northern boundary of the locality, while Neurum Creek is the western boundary. Nerum Creek becomes a tributary of the Stanley River at the north-western corner of the locality (26.95463°S 152.6518°E).

Neurum Mountain is in the south-east of the locality (26.9883°S 152.7317°E) rising to 507 metres (1,663 ft) above sea level.

Neurum Creek Conservation Park is 9.8-hectare (24-acre) protected area in the west of the locality (26.9700°S 152.6850°E).

The predominant land use is grazing on native vegetation.

== History ==
The town takes its name from Neurum Creek, which in turn uses a word from Waka language (Dungidau dialect) meaning ''warts, sores or pock marks''.

Neurum Creek Provisional School opened on 2 August 1880. On 1 January 1909, it became Neurum Creek State School. It closed on 30 September 1942. The school was on the east side of Nerum Road, just south of the junction with Stanton Road (26.9649°S 152.6974°E).

Neurum Post Office opened on 11 December 1880 (known as Neurum Creek between 1887 and 1913) and closed in 1957.

The Kilcoy railway line opened from Woodford to Kilcoy in 1913 with Neurum being served by the Neurum railway station immediate north of the town (26.9610°S 152.6990°E). The line closed from Wamuran to Kilcoy (including Neurum) in June 1964. The Neurum railway station has been dismantled.

== Demographics ==
In the 2011 census, the locality of Neurum had a population of 168 people, 46.4% female and 53.6% male. The median age of the Neurum population was 42 years, 5 years above the national median of 37. 75.3% of people living in Neurum were born in Australia. The other top responses for country of birth were England 2.4%, Fiji 1.8%, Denmark 1.8%, Kenya 1.8%, Czech Republic 1.8%. 87% of people spoke only English at home; the next most common language was 1.8% Danish.

In the 2016 census, the locality of Neurum had a population of 142 people.

In the 2021 census, the locality of Neurum had a population of 178 people.

== Education ==
There are no schools in Neurum. The nearest government primary schools are Woodford State School in neighbouring Woodford to the east and Delaneys Creek State School in neighbouring Delaneys Creek to the south-east. The nearest government secondary school is Woodford State School (to Year 10) to the east, Kilcoy State High School (to Year 12) in Kilcoy to the west, and Tullawong State High School (to Year 12) in Caboolture to south-east.
