= Villeneuve, Queensland =

Villeneuve
- Town
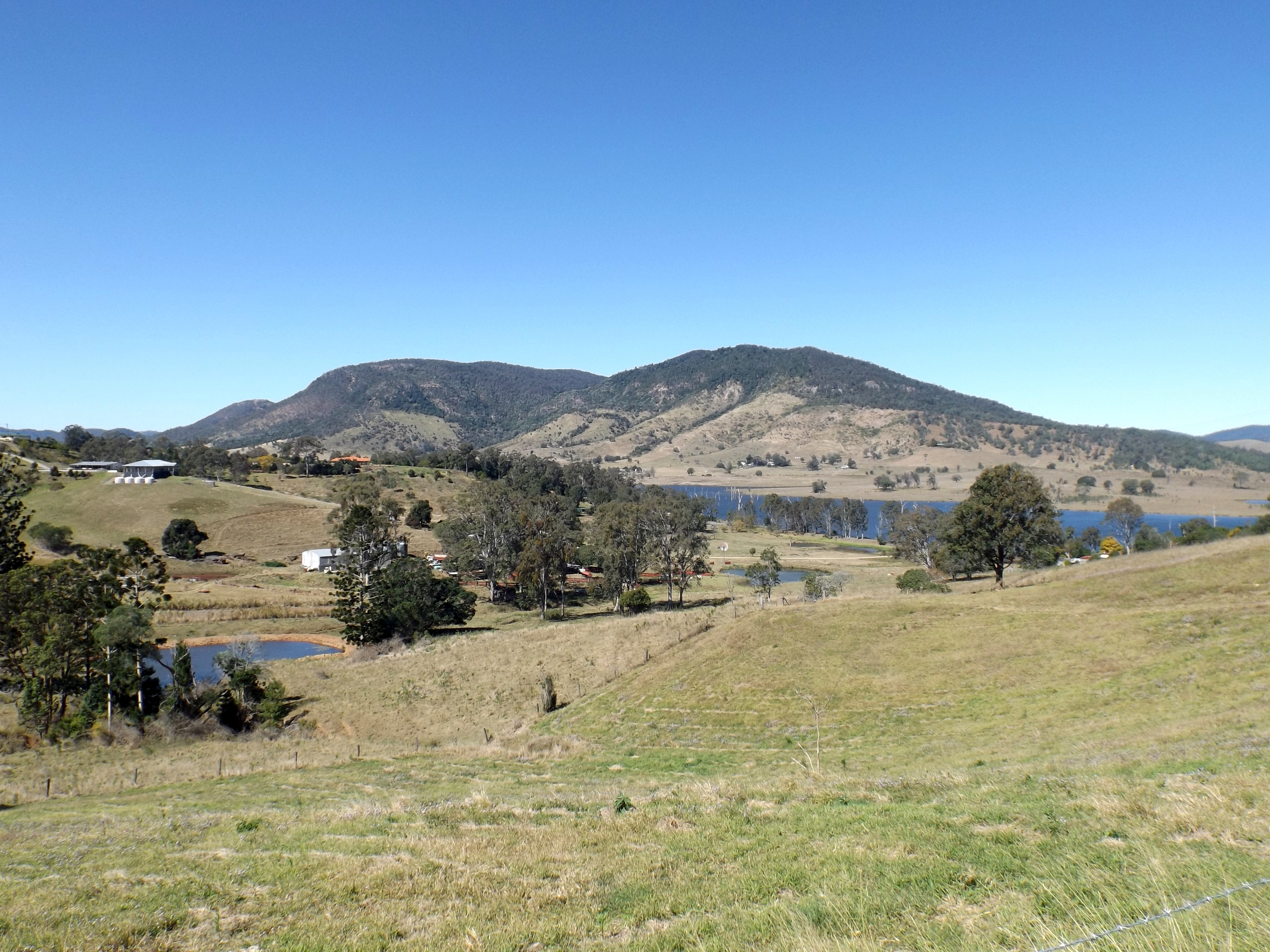
- Paddocks in Villeneuve with Mount Archer in the background, 2015

- Interactive map of Villeneuve
- Coordinates: 26.9616°S 152.6316°E
- Country: Australia
- State: Queensland
- LGA: Somerset Region
- Location: 8.5 km (5.3 mi) SE of Kilcoy; 60.2 km (37.4 mi) NE of Esk; 94.9 km (59.0 mi) NNE of Brisbane

Government
  - State electorate: Nanango
  - Federal division: Blair

Area
  - Total: 6.5 km^{2} (2.5 sq mi)

Population
  - Total: 193 (2021 census)
  - Density: 29.69/km^{2} (76.9/sq mi)
- Time zone: UTC+10:00 (AEST)
- Postcode: 4514
Localities around Villeneuve
Sandy Creek	Sandy Creek	Royston
Glenfern	Villeneuve	Neurum
Glenfern	Mount Archer	Mount Archer

Villeneuve is a rural town and locality in the Somerset Region, Queensland, Australia. In the 2021 census, the locality of Villeneuve had a population of 193 people.

== Geography ==
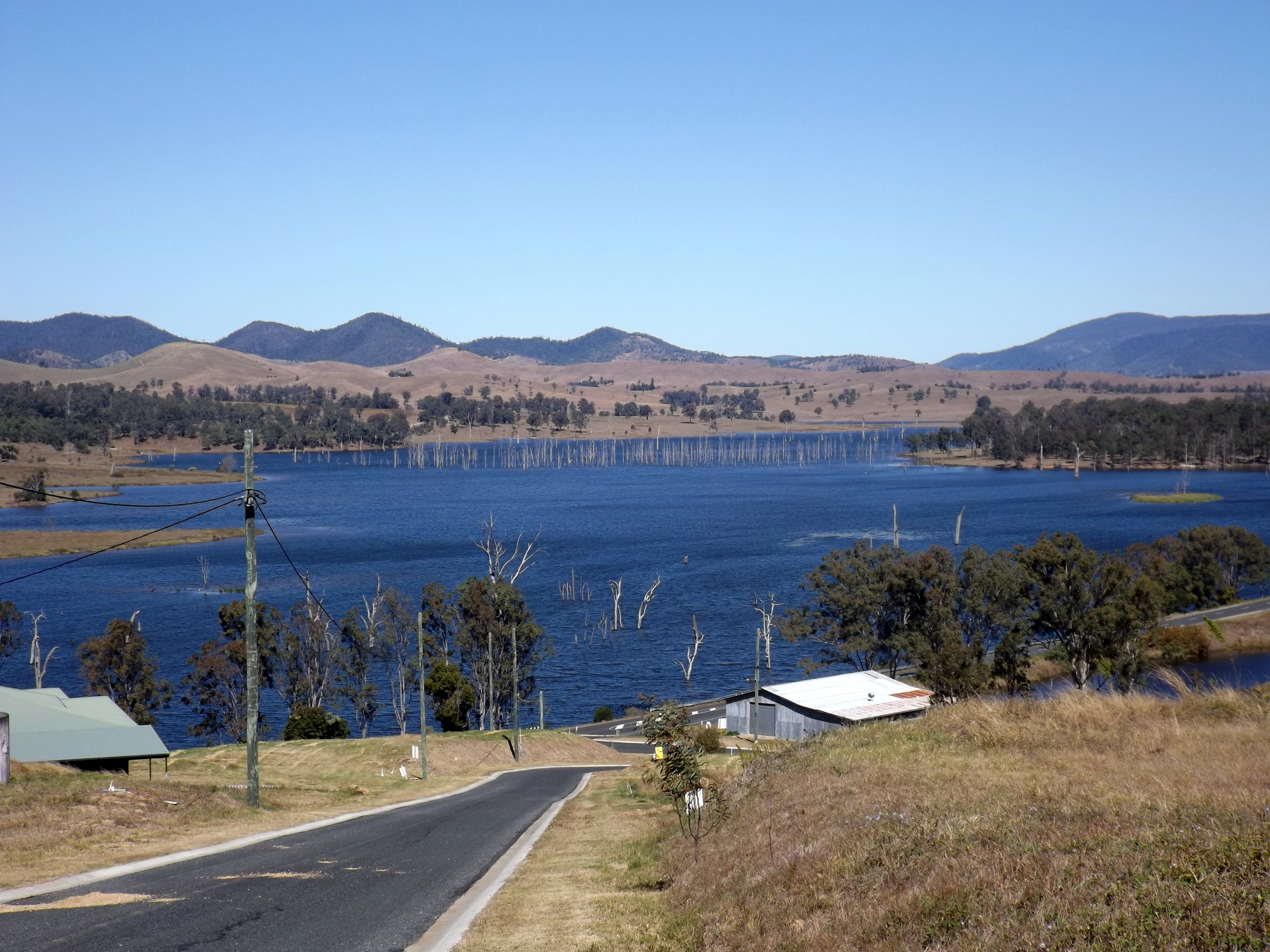
Looking south to Lake Somerset, 2015

A section of the northern boundary of Villeneuve follows the D'Aguilar Highway. The eastern and southern boundaries of the locality are the Stanley River and Lake Somerset created by the Somerset Dam impounding the Stanley River.

The land use is a mix of rural residential (mostly near the lake) and grazing on native vegetation.

The Kilcoy railway line passed through Villeneuve which was served by two railway stations (now both dismantled):

- Villeneuve railway station (26.9627°S 152.6275°E)
- Royston railway station (26.9544°S 152.6482°E)

== History ==
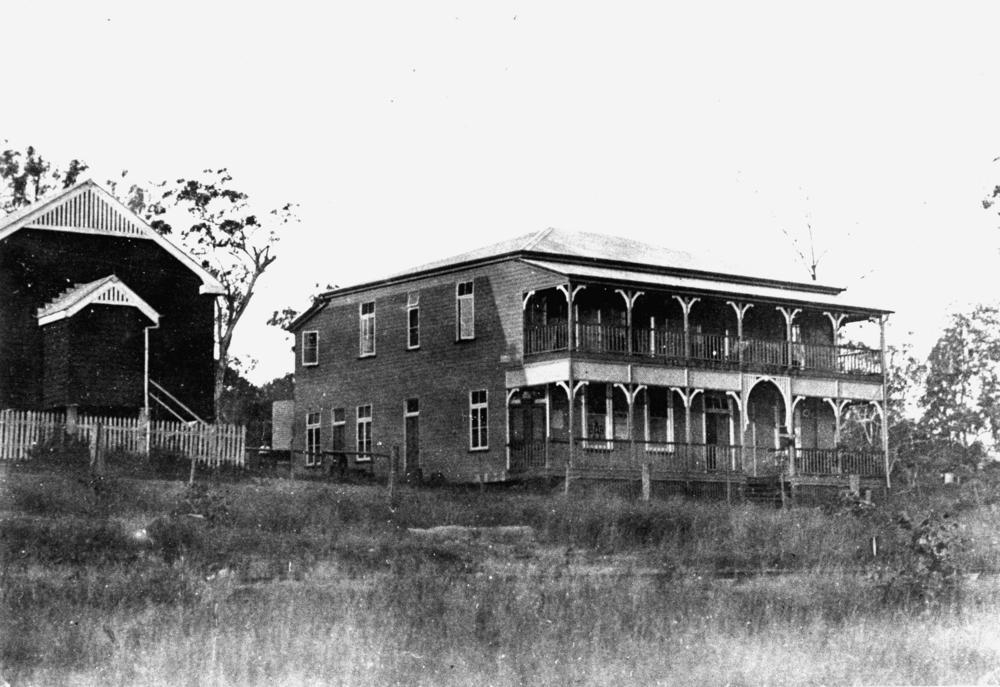
Villeneuve Hotel with Trims Hall to the left

The town is named after the Villeneuve railway station, which in turn took its name from Frank Villeneuve Nicholson, owner of the property Villeneuve.

Farming was established at Villeneuve in the late 1870s.

Villeneuve Provisional School opened on 30 May 1887 with a new building erected in 1888 which it shared with the Anglican Church. In 1902, it was relocated to Westvale and renamed West Vale Provisional School.

St Barnabas' Anglican Church was dedicated on Sunday 2 September 1888 by local rector Reverend J.F. Leighton. It occupied shared premises with the provisional school with the school room being the nave of the church with a chancel being added for church services. It closed circa 1961.

A second Villeneuve Provisional School was built in 1902, which became Villeneuve State School on 1 January 1900. It closed in 1960. It was to the immediate north of the Villeneuve railway station at 1 Mclauchlan Street (26.9615°S 152.6268°E).

As a result of the creation of the Somerset Dam (completed in 1958), some of Villeneuve is now inundated.

== Demographics ==
In the 2016 census, the locality of Villeneuve had a population of 179 people.

In the 2021 census, the locality of Villeneuve had a population of 193 people.

== Education ==
There are no schools in Villenueve. The nearest government primary school is Kilcoy State School in Kilcoy to the west. The nearest government secondary school is Kilcoy State High School, also in Kilcoy.
