= Somerset Dam Power Station =

- Country: Australia
- Location: Somerset, Queensland
- Status: Operational
- Commission date: 1954

Power generation
- Nameplate capacity: 4.1 megawatts

The Somerset Dam Power Station is a hydroelectric power station at Somerset, South East Queensland, Australia. The plant is part of the Somerset Dam and has a generating capacity of 4.1 megawatts. It is the oldest grid-connected hydroelectric station still operating in Queensland.

The 2010–2011 Queensland floods cause the station to be flooded, requiring a $11.6 million restoration. It wasn't until 2019 that the plant resumed generating electricity.

== See also ==
- List of active power stations in Queensland
