= Winya, Queensland =

Winya
- Suburb
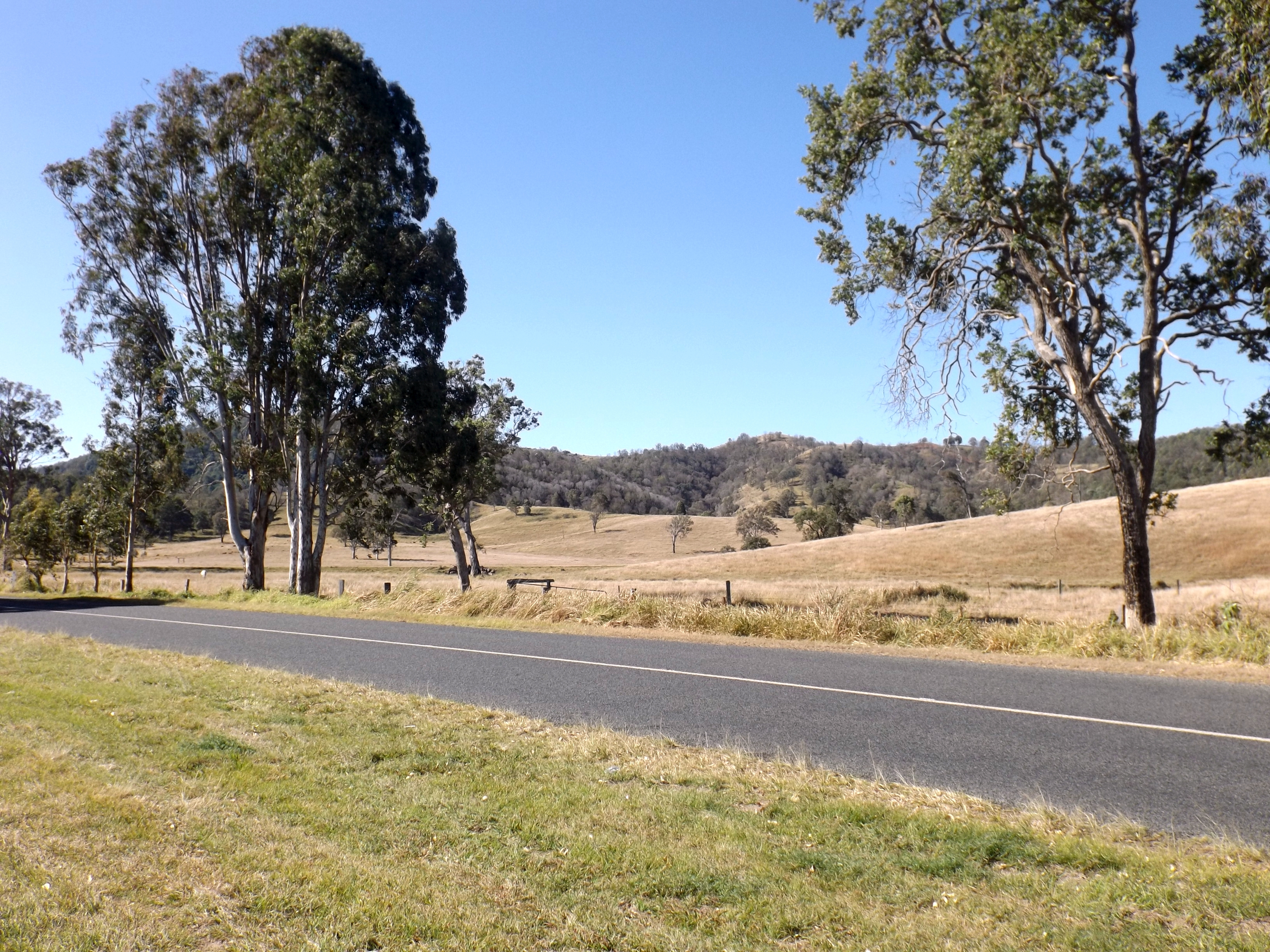
- Mount Kilcoy Road, 2015

- Interactive map of Winya
- Coordinates: 26.9555°S 152.5747°E
- Country: Australia
- State: Queensland
- LGA: Somerset Region
- Location: 2.4 km (1.5 mi) E of Kilcoy; 54.1 km (33.6 mi) NE of Esk; 95.0 km (59.0 mi) NNW of Brisbane

Government
  - State electorate: Nanango
  - Federal division: Blair

Area
  - Total: 23.2 km^{2} (9.0 sq mi)

Population
  - Total: 127 (2021 census)
  - Density: 5.47/km^{2} (14.18/sq mi)
- Time zone: UTC+10:00 (AEST)
- Postcode: 4515
Suburbs around Winya
Sheep Station Creek	Mount Kilcoy	Sandy Creek
Kilcoy; Woolmar	Winya	Glenfern
Hazeldean	Westvale	Westvale

Winya is a rural locality in the Somerset Region, Queensland, Australia. In the 2021 census, Winya had a population of 127 people.

== Geography ==
Sandy Creeks marks a section of the eastern boundary and Kilcoy Creek aligns with some of the eastern border. In the south the locality protrudes into the waters of Somerset Dam when it is at full capacity. Kilcoy Weir straddles the boundary with Mount Kilcoy in the north.

The D'Aguilar Highway passes through Winya.

Kilcoy Airfield is in the south of locality on Kennedys Road (26.9712°S 152.5662°E).

== History ==
Kilcoy Homestead was established in Winya in the 1850s. Settlement in the area had begun as early as 1841.

Winya State School opened in 1918 and closed in 1960. The school was on a 5-acre (2.0 ha) site on the north-east corner of the D'Aguilar Highway and Sandy Creek Road (26.9293°S 152.6073°E), now in neighbouring Sandy Creek.

The Kilcoy railway line from Caboolture reached Winya and through to Kilcoy on 22 December 1913, with the locality served by Winya railway station (26.9365°S 152.5939°E). The Wamuran to Kilcoy section (including Winya) was closed on 30 June 1964.

== Demographics ==
In the 2016 census, Winya had a population of 72 people.

In the 2021 census, Winya had a population of 127 people.

== Economy ==
The Kilcoy Pastoral Company operates an abattoir in Winya. The facility exports beef to more than 20 countries and employs more than 750 workers making it one the five largest beef processors in the country.

== Education ==
There are no schools in Winya. The nearest government primary school is Kilcoy State School in neighbouring Kilcoy to the west. The nearest government secondary school is Kilcoy State High School, also in Kilcoy.

== Amenities ==
The Kilcoy Airfield is available only for recreational use and not for commercial operations.

There are a number of parks in the area:

- Anzac Park (26.9415°S 152.5682°E)
- Aston Park (26.9448°S 152.5681°E)
- Somerset Dam (26.9711°S 152.5788°E)
