= Kilcoy District Historical Society =

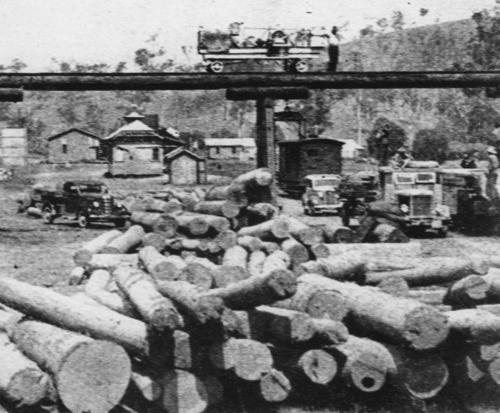
Loading goods and freight at the railway yard -- Kilcoy, 1939

Kilcoy District Historical Society was formed in 1998 as the Kilcoy Shire Historical Society in recognition of the need to actively collect and record the social history of the Kilcoy district in Queensland, Australia businesses and local identities.

Following the successful centenary publications of the Kilcoy State School and St. Mary's Anglican Church by volunteers in the 1990s, the Kilcoy District Historical Society have scanned several thousand images from private collections and recorded oral stories on film, retelling the personal lives of many of the district's pioneer families.

This volunteer work has formed the basis of several published works on the early pioneers of Kilcoy.

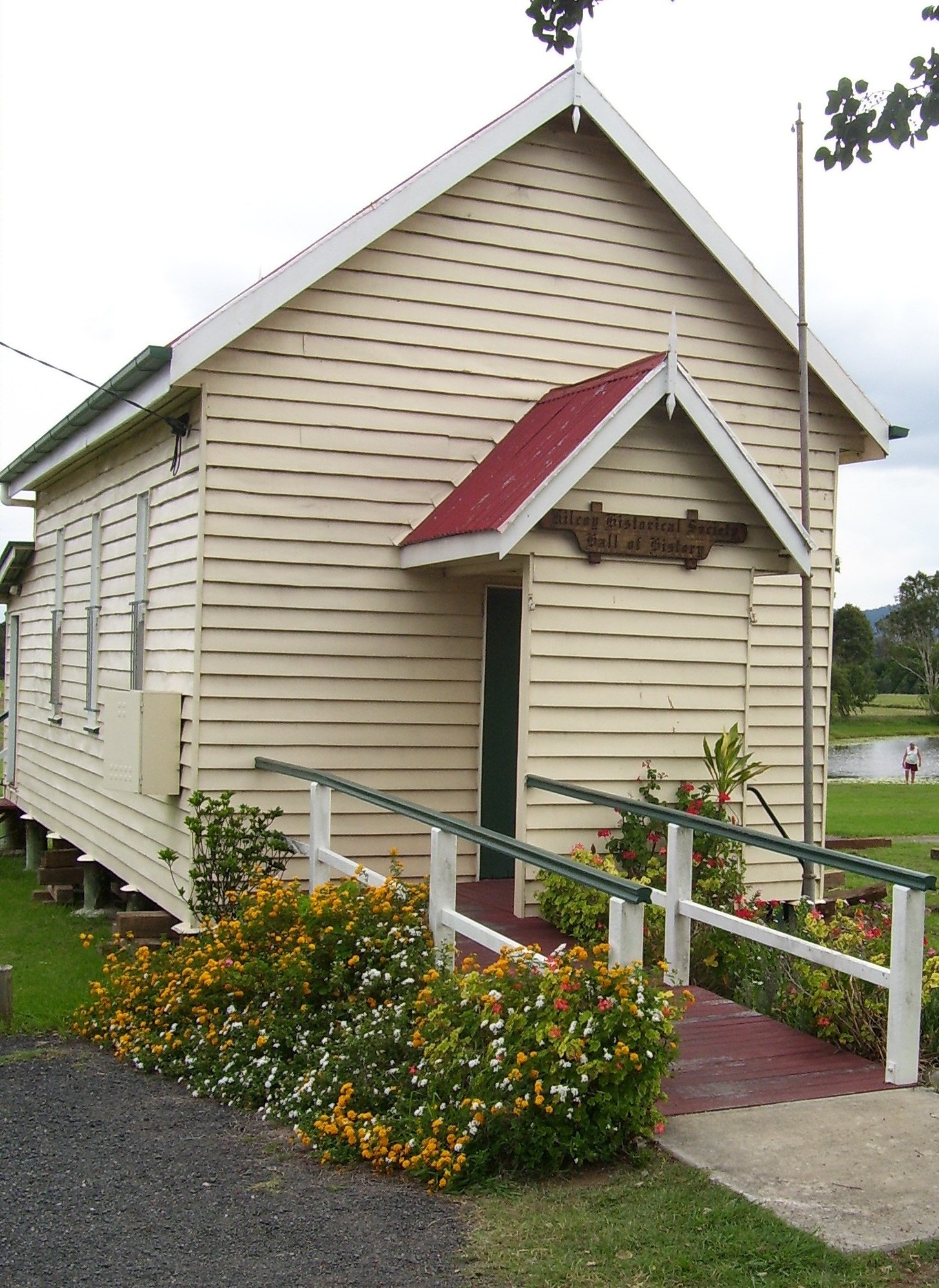
The Hall of History in Yowie Park

== Museum ==
In 2007, a former church at Hazeldean was relocated to 40 Hope Street, in Yowie Park, Kilcoy (26.947307°S 152.5637°E) where it is now a museum operated by the Kilcoy District Historical Society, known as the Hall of History.

== See also ==
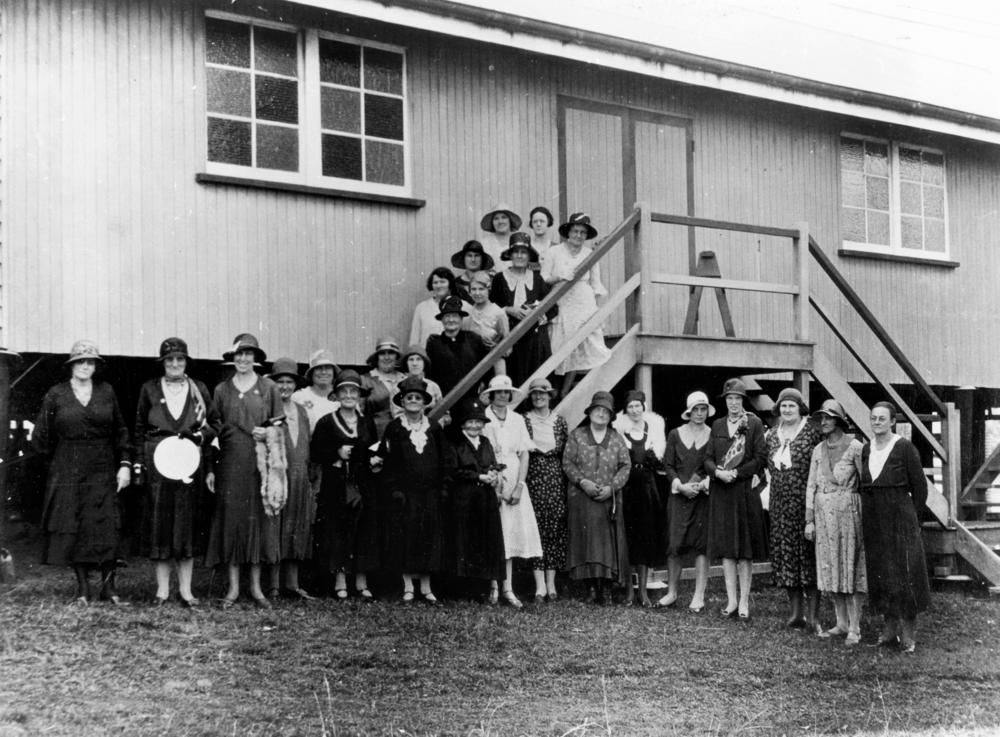
Members of the Country Women's Association in Kilcoy, 1931

- History of Queensland
- History of Somerset Region
