= Mount Kilcoy, Queensland =

Mount Kilcoy
- Suburb
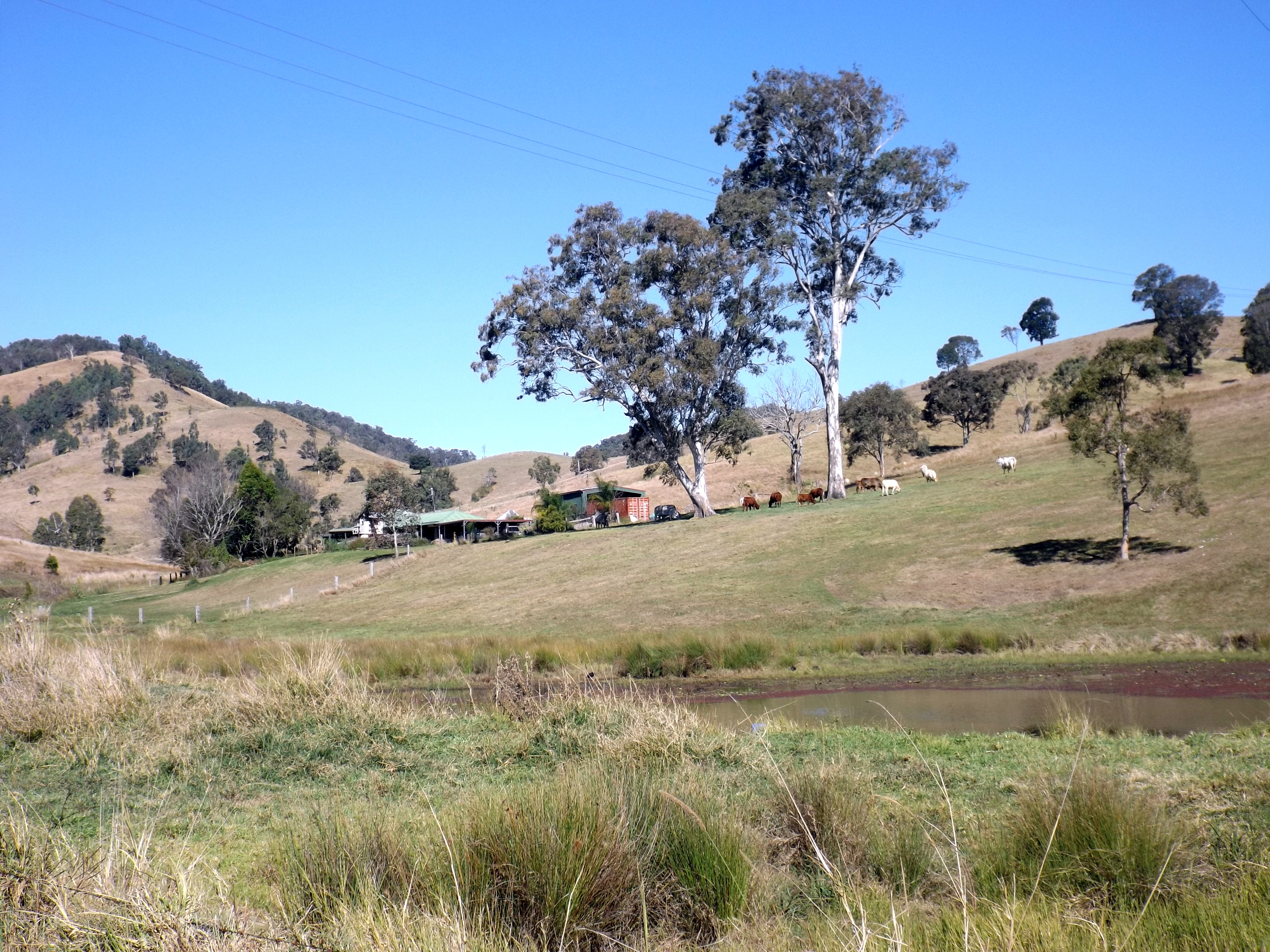
- Paddocks on Jenkinsons Road, 2015

- Interactive map of Mount Kilcoy
- Coordinates: 26.8422°S 152.5724°E
- Country: Australia
- State: Queensland
- LGA: Somerset Region
- Location: 9.6 km (6.0 mi) NNE of Kilcoy; 61.2 km (38.0 mi) NE of Esk; 112 km (70 mi) NNW of Brisbane

Government
  - State electorate: Nanango
  - Federal division: Blair

Area
  - Total: 77.9 km^{2} (30.1 sq mi)

Population
  - Total: 277 (2021 census)
  - Density: 3.556/km^{2} (9.210/sq mi)
- Time zone: UTC+10:00 (AEST)
- Postcode: 4515
Suburbs around Mount Kilcoy
Jimna	Jimna	Jimna
Sheep Station Creek	Mount Kilcoy	Sandy Creek
Sheep Station Creek	Winya	Sandy Creek

Mount Kilcoy is a rural locality in the Somerset Region, Queensland, Australia. In the 2021 census, Mount Kilcoy had a population of 277 people.

== Geography ==
Mount Kilcoy occupies a valley drained by Kilcoy Creek at the southern end of the Conondale Range. Kilcoy Weir was built at Mount Kilcoy and is able to retain a maximum of 158 megalitres. The flatter land along the creek is used for agriculture while the sloping terrain towards the north, east and western boundaries remains vegetated.

== History ==
The locality takes its name from the mountain which in turn takes its name from the pastoral station established by brothers Evan and Colin Mackenzie in 1842, which in turns takes its name from Kilcoy in Ross-shire, Scotland (57.5376°N 4.3708°W).

Mount Kilcoy State School opened on 18 January 1909 with one teacher and 26 students.

== Demographics ==
In the 2011 census, Mount Kilcoy had a population of 255 people.

In the 2016 census, Mount Kilcoy had a population of 261 people.

In the 2021 census, Mount Kilcoy had a population of 277 people.

== Education ==
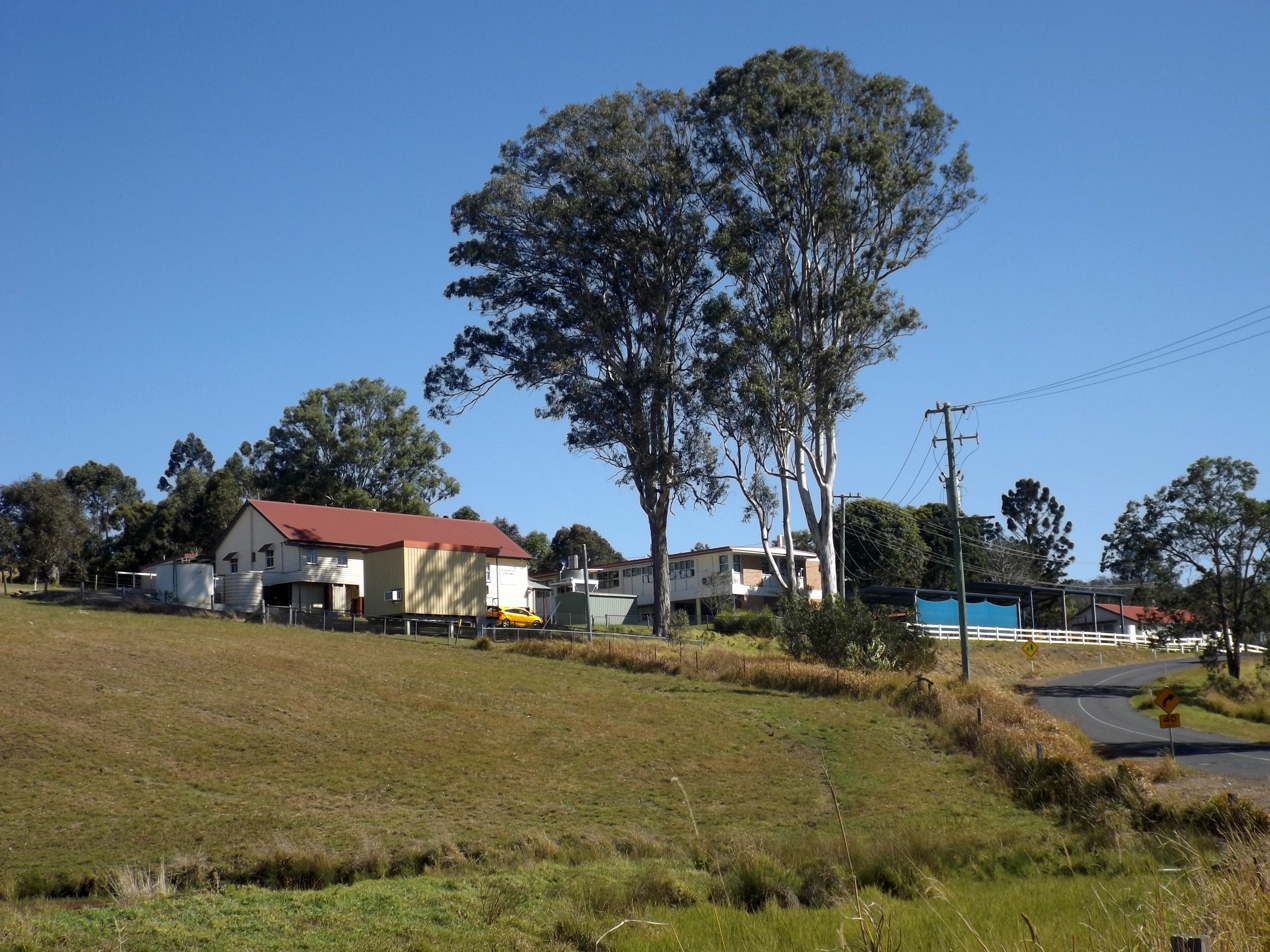
Mount Kilcoy State School, 2015

Mount Kilcoy State School is a government primary (Prep–6) school for boys and girls at 251 Jenkinsons Road (26.8736°S 152.5869°E). In 2017, the school had an enrolment of 129 students with 13 teachers (8 full-time equivalent) and 7 non-teaching staff (5 full-time equivalent).

There are no secondary schools in Mount Kilcoy. The nearest government secondary school is Kilcoy State High School in Kilcoy to the south.
