= Kilcoy, Queensland =

Kilcoy
- Town
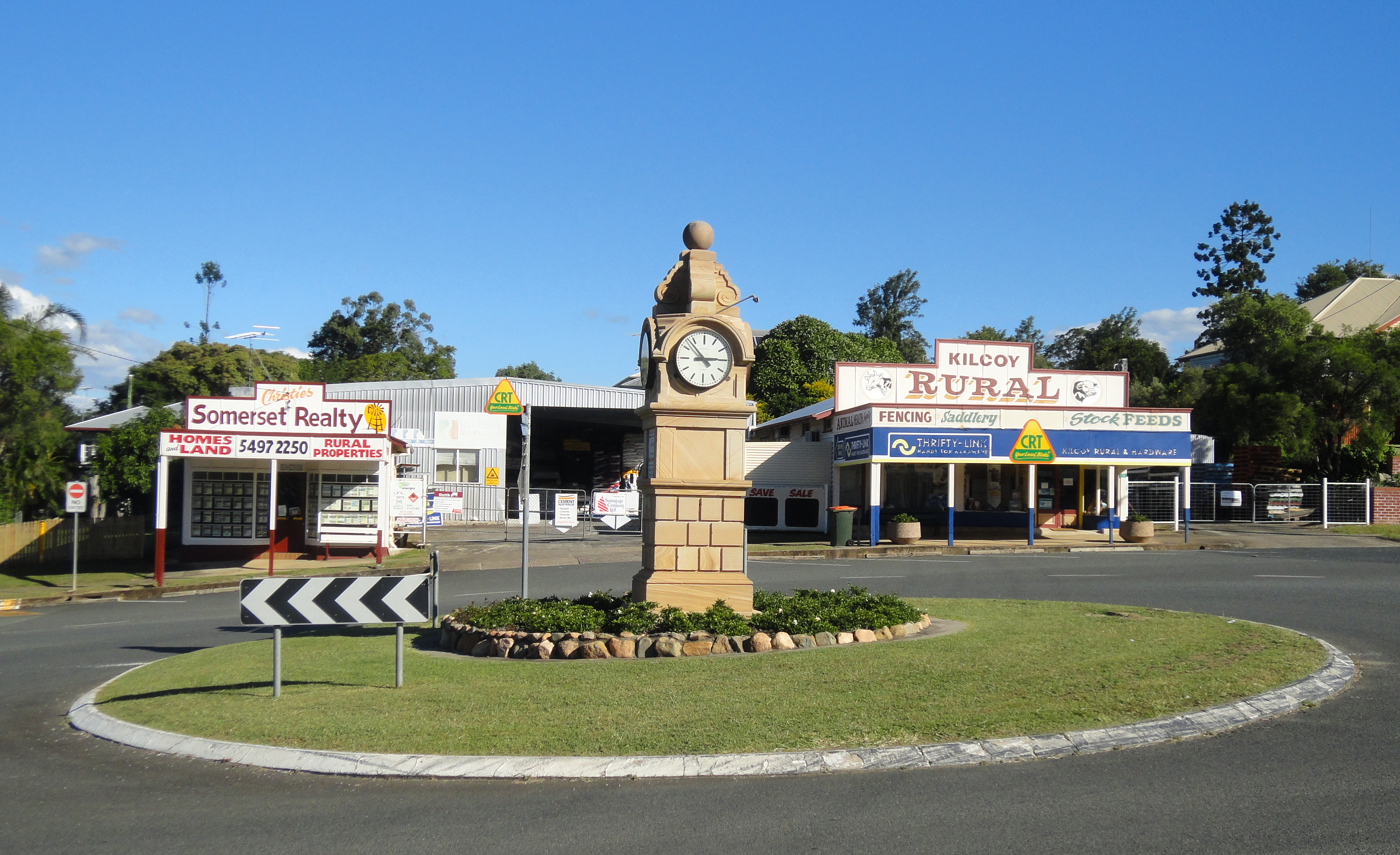
- Main Street, Kilcoy

- Interactive map of Kilcoy
- Coordinates: 26.9430°S 152.5652°E
- Country: Australia
- State: Queensland
- LGA: Somerset Region
- Location: 49.2 km (30.6 mi) WNW of Caboolture; 51.6 km (32.1 mi) NE of Esk; 97.4 km (60.5 mi) NW of Brisbane CBD

Government
  - State electorate: Nanango
  - Federal division: Blair

Area
  - Total: 3.3 km^{2} (1.3 sq mi)

Population
  - Total: 1,996 (2021 census)
  - Density: 605/km^{2} (1,567/sq mi)
- Time zone: UTC+10:00 (AEST)
- Postcode: 4515
Localities around Kilcoy
Sheep Station Creek	Sheep Station Creek; Winya	Winya
Woolmar	Kilcoy	Winya
Woolmar	Woolmar	Winya

Kilcoy is a rural town and locality in the Somerset Region, Queensland, Australia. In the 2021 census, the locality of Kilcoy had a population of 1,996 people.

== Geography ==
The township is on the D'Aguilar Highway, 94 kilometres (58 mi) north west of the state capital, Brisbane, and just to the north of Lake Somerset.

=== Climate ===
Rainfall in January 2013, another year of floods was 364.4 millimetres (14.35 in).

== History ==
=== Aboriginal history ===
The Aboriginal people of the Brisbane River Valley and Kilcoy region are the Jinibara People, traditionally a nation of five clans: the Dungidau centred in the Kilcoy region and the junction of the Stanley and Brisbane Rivers; the Dala or Dallumbara clan inhabiting the Conondale Range west to the Brisbane River; the Gurumngar around the southern end of the D’Aguilar Range; the Nalbo along the Maleny-Mapleton escarpment and the Dungibara on the Upper Brisbane River.

Duungidjawu (also known as Kabi Kabi, Cabbee, Carbi, Gabi Gabi) is an Australian Aboriginal language spoken on Duungidjawu country. The Duungidjawu language region includes the landscape within the local government boundaries of Somerset Region and City of Moreton Bay, particularly the towns of Caboolture, Kilcoy, Woodford and Moore.

Kilcoy was the heartland of the Jinibara People and the name comes from a patch of lawyer cane (jini) on Mount Kilcoy; 'bara' means' people' or 'folk'; thus Jinibara are the 'People of the Lawyer cane'. Kilcoy was known as Bumgur, meaning the 'blue cod'.

The Kilcoy region is a rich Aboriginal cultural landscape. Mount Archer was known as Buruja, and also the name of a wetland near Villeneuve that was one of the main camps of the Dungidau clan. Bora rings existed at 'Wellcourt' on Somerset Dam and at Sandy Creek east of Kilcoy, Oaky Creek and Waraba Creek.

The junction of the Brisbane and Stanley Rivers was known as Gunundjin, meaning a 'hollow place', and a sacred place, called Gairnbee Rock, recalled a dreaming story of a girl who went swimming there and was turned by her father, a gundir (clever man) by magic into a rock to save her from a dangerous evil spirit. The Stanley River was also called Gairnbee, meaning the water gum.

=== British colonisation ===
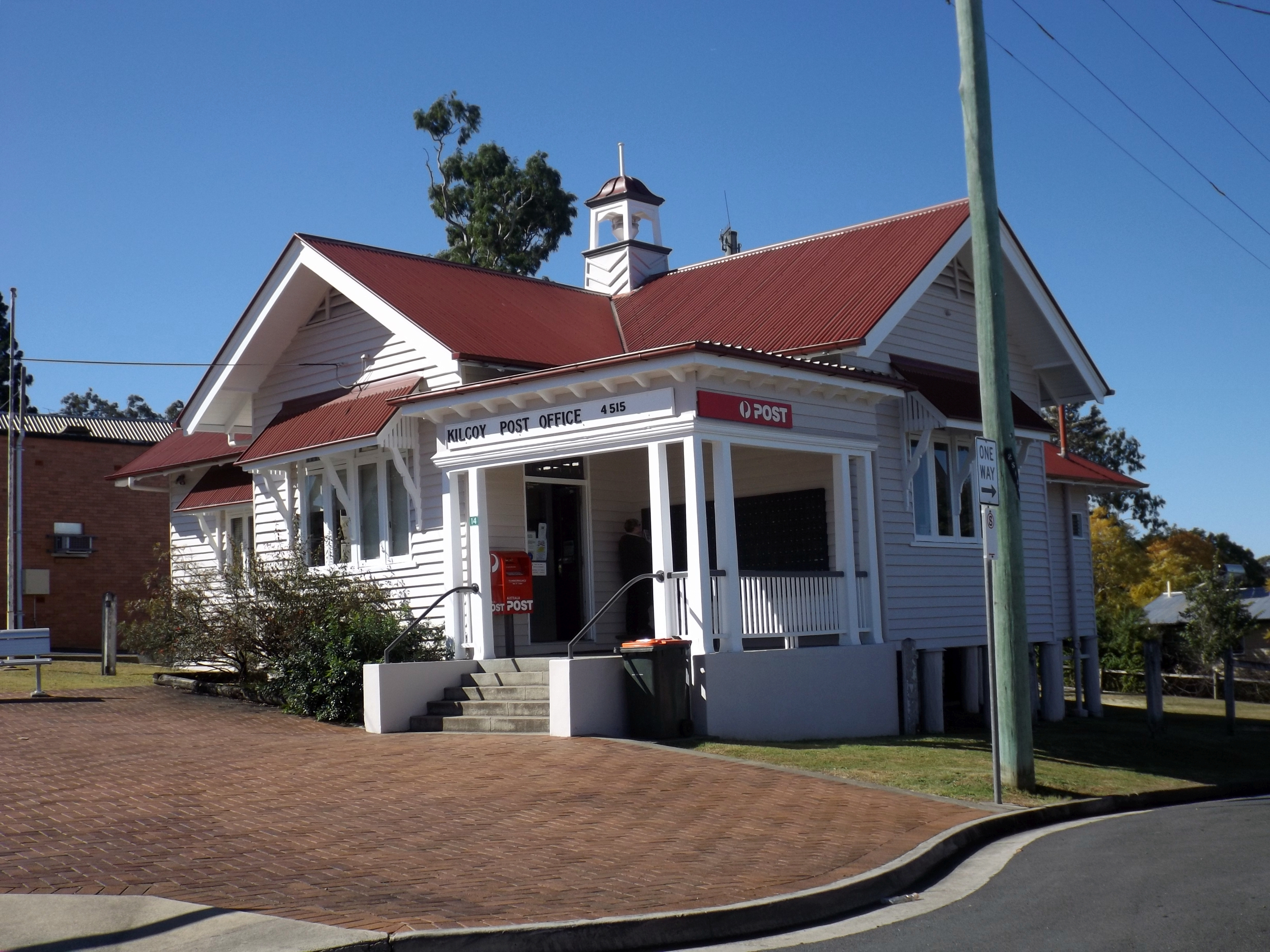
Kilcoy Post Office, 2015

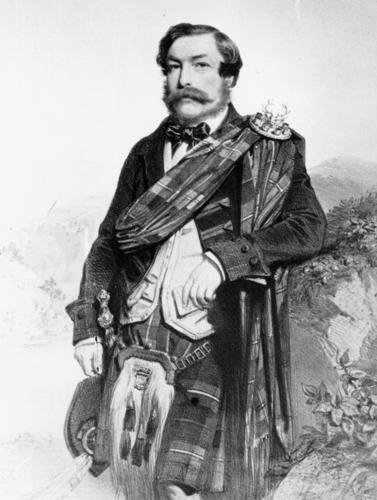
Sir Evan Mackenzie

In 1841, brothers Evan and Colin Mackenzie, of Kilcoy Castle, Newtown Scotland, took up land west of Durundur (in the Stanley River valley) and began grazing sheep soon after land was opened to free settlement. They named it after their home town. They sold the property to Charles A. Atherton in 1849. Atherton in turn sold it to Captain Louis Hope and John Ramsay in 1854. The partnership broke up ten years later, and Hope became sole owner and built the Kilcoy Station homestead of bricks, made on the property, and red cedar. Station managers for Captain Hope were Bryant about 1860, Captain Talbot, 1864 and William Butler from 1871 until the sale, where he purchased the homestead block. Hopetoun Post Office opened on 1 December 1892 (a Kilcoy receiving office had been open from 1889) and was renamed Kilcoy in 1907.

==== Massacre of Aboriginal people ====
In 1842 on the outskirts of Kilcoy Station owned by MacKenzie, 30–60 aborigines of the Gubbi Gubbi tribe, two Djindubari and some men from the Dalla tribe died from eating flour that settlers had laced with strychnine or arsenic. News of this massacre was shared among Aboriginal people attending the Bunya Festival nearby. In his memoirs, Thomas Petrie recalled being told of the massacre by Aboriginal people at "one of the "bon-yi" feasts he attended." Inter-tribal meetings were held and Old Moppy was instrumental in forging an alliance among the groups.

News of the massacre at Kilcoy reached Sydney in December 1842, when an extract of a German missionary's journal describing an expedition to the Bunya Country was published in The Colonial Observer. During the expedition the missionaries and the Aboriginal people accompanying them discovered that "a large number of natives, (about 50 or 60) having been poisoned at one of the squatter's stations."

Dr Stephen Simpson was appointed Commissioner for Crown Lands at Moreton Bay in May 1842. Allegations of the massacre on the Mackenzie Brothers' Kilcoy station were brought to his attention soon after his appointment. He attempted to investigate these allegations during a northern expedition in March - April 1843 which included interviewing some Aboriginal people.

In May 1861, evidence about the massacre was presented during the hearings of the Select Committee on the Native Police Force.

=== Establishment of township ===
In 1877, 2,240 acres (910 ha) were resumed from the Kilcoy pastoral run and offered for selection on 19 April 1877.

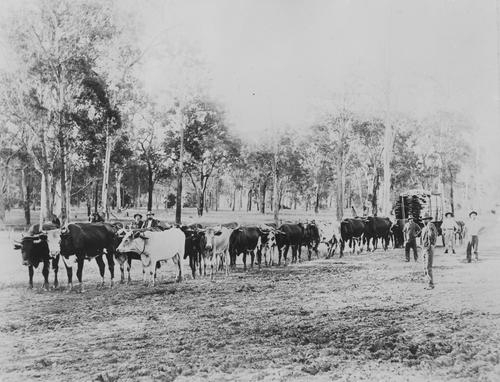
Bullock team hauling timber in the Kilcoy district, ca. 1912

Timber milling operations were established as early as 1877, with Frank Nicholson building at Villeneuve, followed by James Green (1888), Hancock Brothers (1897), George Seeney and William and Stan Kropp in the same vicinity. The turn of the century saw a huge increase in activity as Hancock & Gore timber mill began operation.

The site of the 'Town of Kilcoy' was surveyed by W. E. Hill by April 1888, and the first land sale was on 6 November that year. The township quickly developed at the junction of Sheep Station and Kilcoy Creeks to service these settlers and their families.

By the 1890s, the only original lease country left was in the Mt Kilcoy and Sandy Creek districts, part of Durundur Station. This country was not opened for settlement until 1902.

Kilcoy's first Provisional School was opened in 1884 at Sheep Station Creek, some five to six miles north of Kilcoy Homestead, the name changing to Sheep Station Creek Provisional School in 1892 when the Kilcoy School opened its doors in Hope Street in Kilcoy. At that time there were still no subdivisions north of William Street as that was part of Kilcoy Station which was sold up in 1907.

St Mary's Anglican Church was built in 1887. The timber church could seat 120 people.

A postal receiving office was established in 1889. On 1 December 1892, the Hopetoun Post Office was opened at Kilcoy in rented premises in Royston Street. It was named after Louis Hope (the uncle of the first Governor General of Australia, Lord Hopetoun, who was a visitor to Kilcoy Station). The township was referred to unofficially as Hopetoun.

Kilcoy Township Provisional School opened on 15 August 1892. In 1893, it was renamed Kilcoy Provisional School. In 1898, it was renamed Hopetoun Provisional School. In 1907, it became Hopetoun State School. In 1914, it was renamed Kilcoy State School.

Brighton Hills Provisional School opened circa November 1904 and closed circa July 1918. It was described as "via Kilcoy".

=== 20th century ===
Kilcoy Methodist Church was built from timber by Mr C. Festers. It was opened on Saturday 14 October 1905 by the Reverend William Henry Harrison, President of the Methodist Conference. In 1977, following the amalgamation of the Methodist Church into the Uniting Church in Australia, it became the Kilcoy Uniting Church. It closed on 28 February 2021. It was on a 0.5-acre (0.20 ha) site at 74 William Street (26.94314°S 152.55991°E).

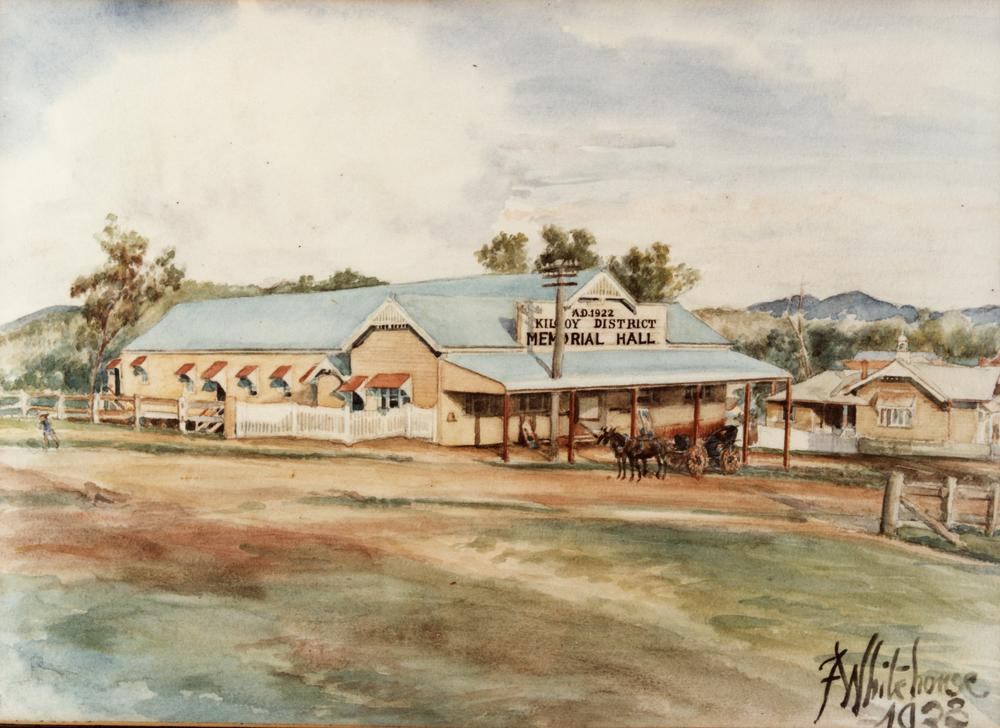
Kilcoy District Memorial Hall, 1923

In 1908, the post office name was changed from Hopetoun to Kilcoy, to avoid incorrect mail distribution to other towns of the same name in Victoria and Western Australia.

St Michael's Roman Catholic Church was built in 1911 from timber. It was extended in 1914.

In 1912, the Shire of Kilcoy was formed, and the area became independent from the Caboolture Shire.

The post office in Kennedy Street opened in 1913.

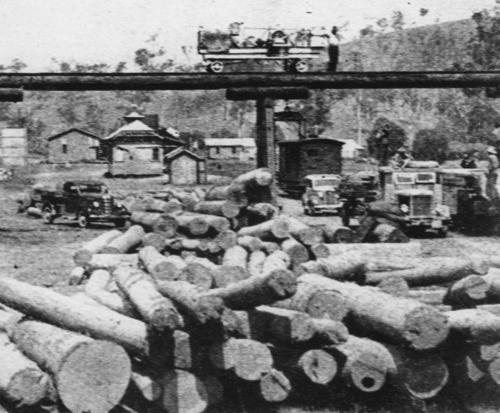
Kilcoy railway in 1939

The establishment of the Kilcoy railway line in 1913 created a surge in the timber industry with more mills opening near Kilcoy (Bert Woodrow – c. 1916; Thurecht Brothers – c. 1918, George Payne – c. 1919) and at Louisavale (1912), Monsildale (1912) and Yednia (early 1900s).

The rural areas within a relatively small radius of Kilcoy township catering for the settlers laboring in the industries of dairy, cattle and timber were flourishing with cultural activity and those early years around the turn of the century witnessed small schools spring up in West Vale (1887–1910), Villeneuve (1902–1960), Hazeldean (Stanley River, 1898–1973), Gregors Creek (1896–1963), Woolmar (1894–1941), Louisavale (1915–1940), Monsildale (1913–1922 and 1941–1961), Jimna (1923–2006), Yednia (1911–1946), Sheep Station Creek (1884–1942), Somerset at upper Mount Kilcoy (1915–1943), Mount Kilcoy (1909) and Sandy Creek (Winya, 1918–1960).

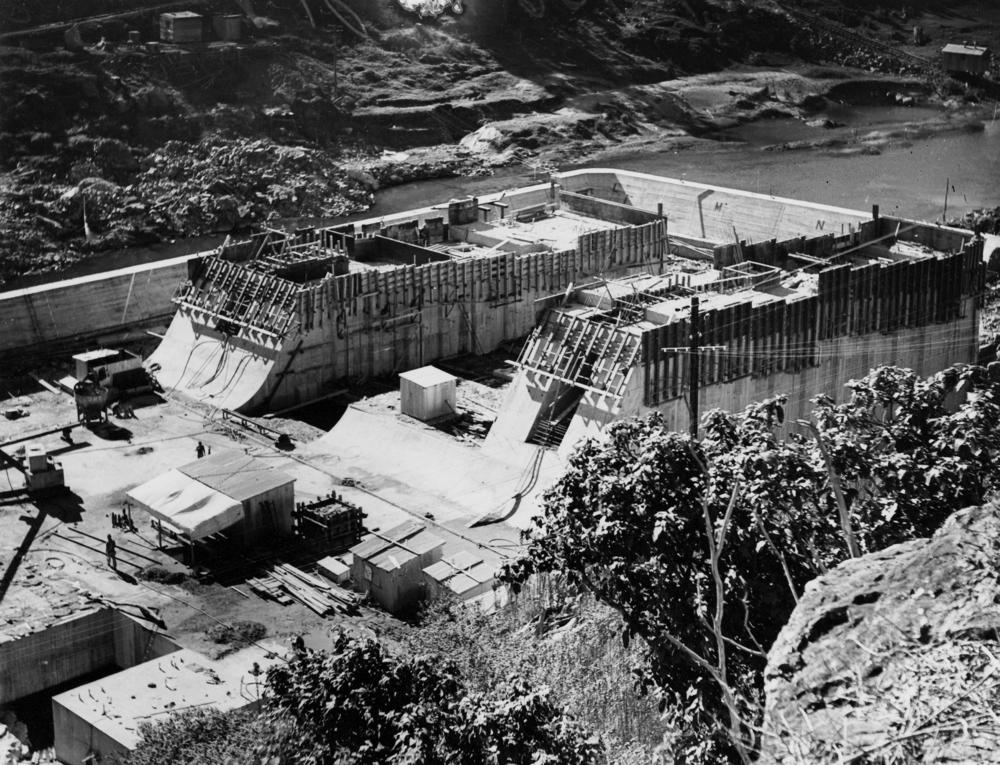
Somerset Dam during construction, July 1938

Somerset Dam was constructed between 1935 and 1959 with suspension of construction during the Second World War. The dam is situated on the Stanley River approximately 220 kilometres (140 mi) upstream from the mouth of the Brisbane River. Construction of the Somerset Dam created many jobs, one of the project's intentions as it commence during the Great Depression.

In 1953, the Kilcoy Pastoral Company established an abattoir in the town.

The Jinibara people were granted Native Title by the Federal Court of Australia in 2012. The application used a series of tape recordings made in the 1950s of Aboriginal man, Gaiarbau, (also known as Willie MacKenzie) that provided detailed understandings of Aboriginal culture in southeast Queensland. Gaiabau was born at Kilcoy in the 1870s and died in a Salvation Army Home in Brisbane and was buried on 24 June 1968 in Mt Gravatt Cemetery.

In the 1960s, road transport ensured the demise of the railway line (1964) and the old Kilcoy railway yard was converted many years later into a park known as Yowie Park.

In January 1963, a secondary department was added to Kilcoy State School. On 1 January 1972 Kilcoy State High School opened, replacing the secondary department at Kilcoy State School.

=== 21st century ===
Kilcoy Wesleyan Methodist Church was built from timber in 2000.

The current Kilcoy library opened in 2011.

A sand mining operation was proposed for the town in 2011.

Circa 2018, the Uniting Church building was used for services by the Kilcoy United Pentecostal Church and the Kilcoy Seventh Day Adventist Church. As at 2024, neither congregation appears to be active in the town.

== Demographics ==
In the 2011 census, the locality of Kilcoy had a population of 1,714 people.

In the 2016 census, the locality of Kilcoy had a population of 1,898 people.

In the 2021 census, the locality of Kilcoy had a population of 1,996 people.

== Heritage listings ==
Kilcoy has a number of heritage-listed sites, including Kilcoy Homestead on Kilcoy-Murgon Road.

== Education ==
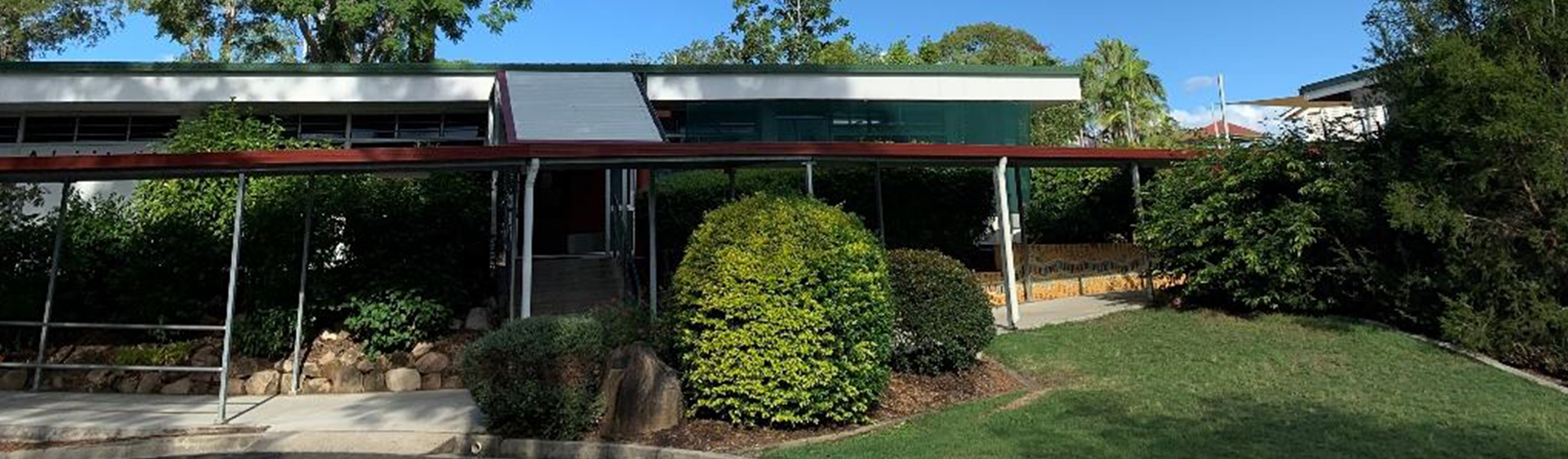
Kilcoy State School, 2022

Kilcoy State School is a government primary (Prep–6) school for boys and girls at 47 Royston Street (26.9456°S 152.5618°E). In 2018, the school had an enrolment of 304 students with 28 teachers (20 full-time equivalent) and 21 non-teaching staff (11 full-time equivalent).

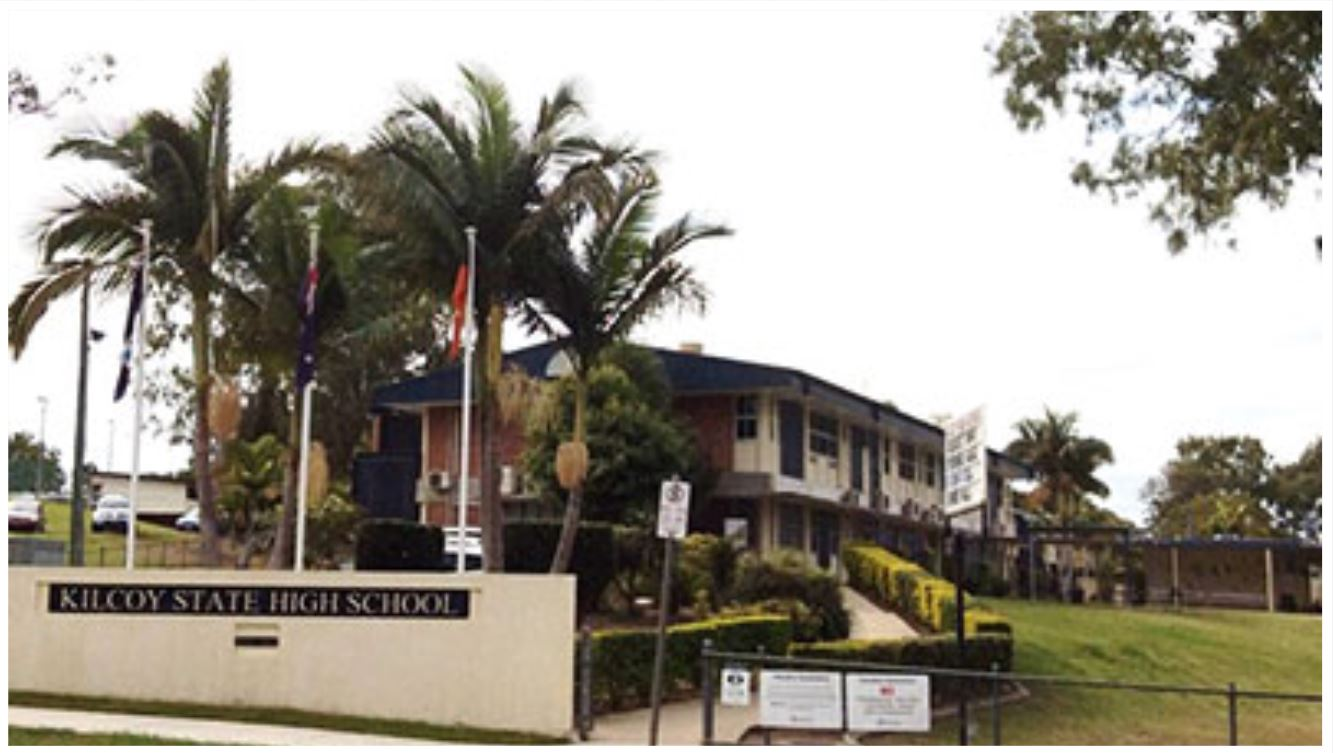
Kilcoy State High School, 2022

Kilcoy State High School is a government secondary (7–12) school for boys and girls in Seib Street (26.9397°S 152.5672°E). In 2018, the school had an enrolment of 405 students with 39 teachers (36 full-time equivalent) and 25 non-teaching staff (18 full-time equivalent). It includes a special education program.

== Amenities ==
The Somerset Regional Council operates a public library at 15 Kennedy Street (26.94117°S 152.56390°E).

The Kilcoy branch of the Queensland Country Women's Association meets at the QCWA Hall at 33 Rose Street (26.94362°S 152.56263°E).

There are a number of parks in the area:

- Anzac Park (26.9415°S 152.5682°E)
- Aston Park (26.9448°S 152.5681°E)
- Kennedy Park (26.9424°S 152.5634°E)

== Churches ==
There are a number of churches in Kilcoy, including:

- St Mary's Anglican Church, 67 William Street Service Road (26.943977°S 152.56°E)
- St Michael's Roman Catholic Church, 28 Kennedy Street (26.940329°S 152.564°E)
- Kilcoy Wesleyan Methodist Church, part of the Wesleyan Methodist Church of Australia, 30 McCauley Street (26.9407°S 152.5634°E)

The local Stanley River Roman Catholic parish has a strong ecumenical focus.

Saint Mary's Anglican Church is notable for its liberalism and gay-friendly Anglo-Catholic churchmanship. It maintains a close relationship with the Roman Catholic Church. The parish's last two priests have been females and one trainee minister has been gay. Under one of these priests, the church has adopted Progressive Christianity and Jesuit spirituality.

== Attractions ==
The Kilcoy District Historical Society operates the Hall of History at 39 Hope Street in Yowie Park (26.94750°S 152.56373°E). The hall contains documents, photos, and artifacts from the district's history.

A history trail has been established to tour past the historical buildings in the town. The trail guide is available from the Hall of History.

The Kilcoy Visitor Information Centre is at 41 Hope Street (26.94776°S 152.56322°E).

== Notable residents ==
- Merri Rose – politician (Labor Party)
- Robert Copeland – Australian rules footballer, Brisbane Lions dual-premiership player
- Rebel Morrow – Olympic equestrian who represented Australia at the 2004 Athens Olympics in eventing, placing 11th individually and winning team bronze. Morrow was born in Kilcoy and began riding at a young age in the local region.
- Arthur Butler (historian) – Born at Kilcoy, 1872. Kilcoy's first doctor 1899. Awarded the Distinguished Service Order for heroism at Gallipoli. Commander of the 3rd Australian Field Ambulance during battles of Bullecourt and Passchendaele. Author of the official three volume history of the Australian medical service in World War 1.
