= Somerset Dam =

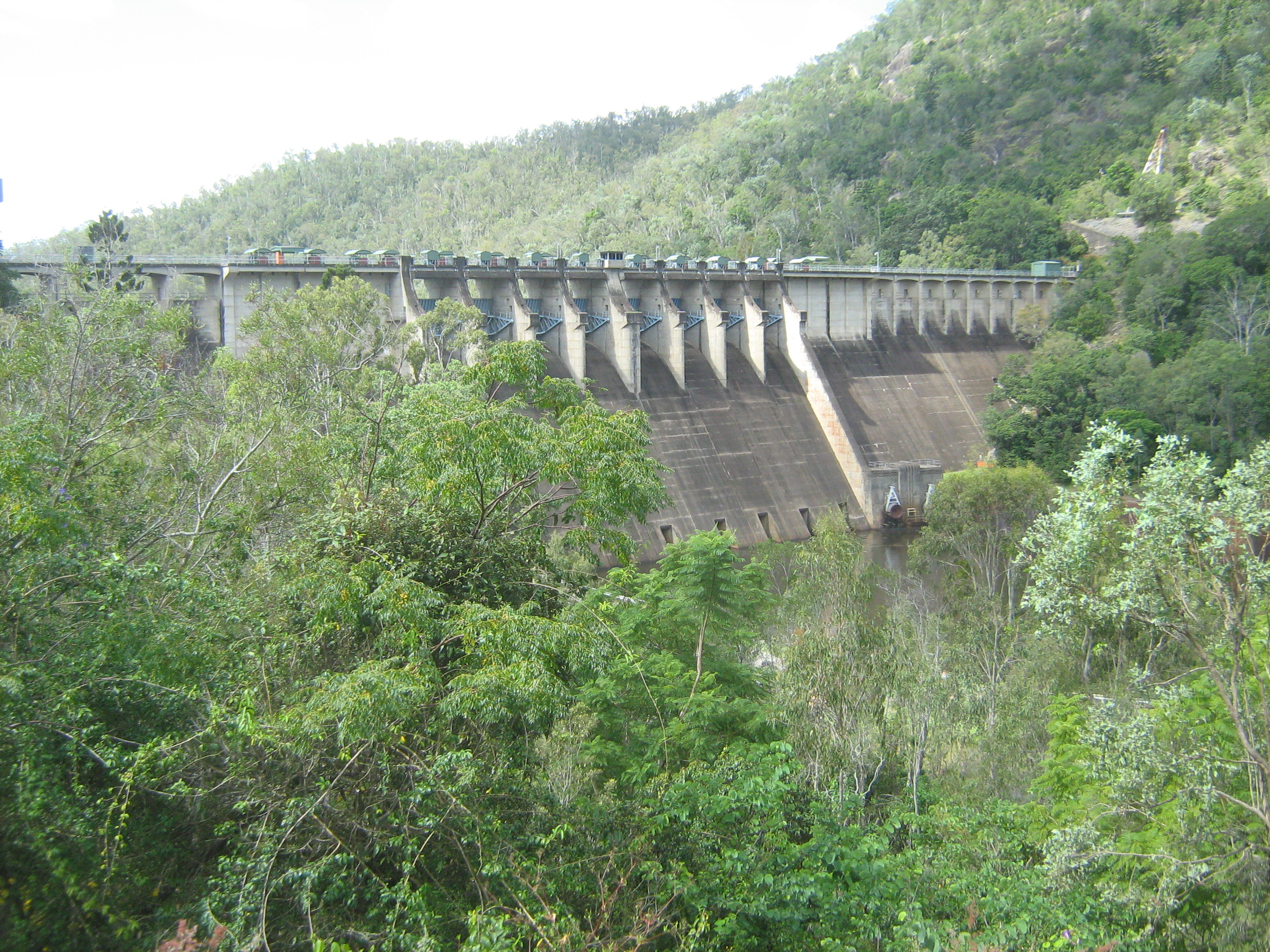
- Wall of Somerset Dam

- Location of the Somerset Dam in Queensland
- Country: Australia
- Location: South East Queensland
- Coordinates: 27°06′55″S 152°33′24″E
- Purpose: Potable water supply; Flood mitigation; Recreation; Hydroelectricity
- Status: Operational
- Construction began: 1935
- Opening date: 1959
- Operator: SEQ Water

Dam and spillways
- Type of dam: Gravity dam
- Impounds: Stanley River
- Height: 50 m (160 ft)
- Length: 305 m (1,001 ft)
- Width (base): 41 m (135 ft)
- Dam volume: 203×10^{3} m^{3} (7.2×10^{6} cu ft)
- Spillway type: Gated
- Spillway capacity: 4,650 m^{3}/s (164,000 cu ft/s)

Reservoir
- Creates: Lake Somerset
- Total capacity: 904,000 ML (199×10^{9} imp gal; 239×10^{9} US gal)
- Active capacity: 380,000 ML (84×10^{9} imp gal; 100×10^{9} US gal)
- Inactive capacity: 524,000 ML (115×10^{9} imp gal; 138×10^{9} US gal)
- Catchment area: 1,330 km^{2} (510 sq mi)
- Surface area: 4,350 ha (10,700 acres)
- Maximum length: 52 m (171 ft)
- Maximum width: 7 m (23 ft)
- Normal elevation: 108 m (354 ft) AHD

Somerset Dam
- Commission date: 1959
- Installed capacity: 3.2 MW (4,300 hp)
- Annual generation: 12 GWh (43 TJ)
- Website www.seqwater.com.au

The Somerset Dam is a mass concrete gravity dam with a gated spillway across the Stanley River in Queensland, Australia. It is within the locality of Somerset Dam in the Somerset Region in South East Queensland. The main purpose of the dam is the supply of potable water for the Brisbane, Gold Coast and Logan City regions. Additionally, the dam provides for flood mitigation, recreation and for the generation of hydroelectricity. The impounded reservoir is called Lake Somerset.

As early as the 1960s it had become clear that the dam could not meet the water requirements of the region by the 1980s.

The dam, lake and surrounding village of Somerset are named in honour of Henry Plantagenet Somerset, a local grazier and Member of the Legislative Assembly of Queensland who represented the seat of Stanley from 1904 until 1920.

== Location and features ==
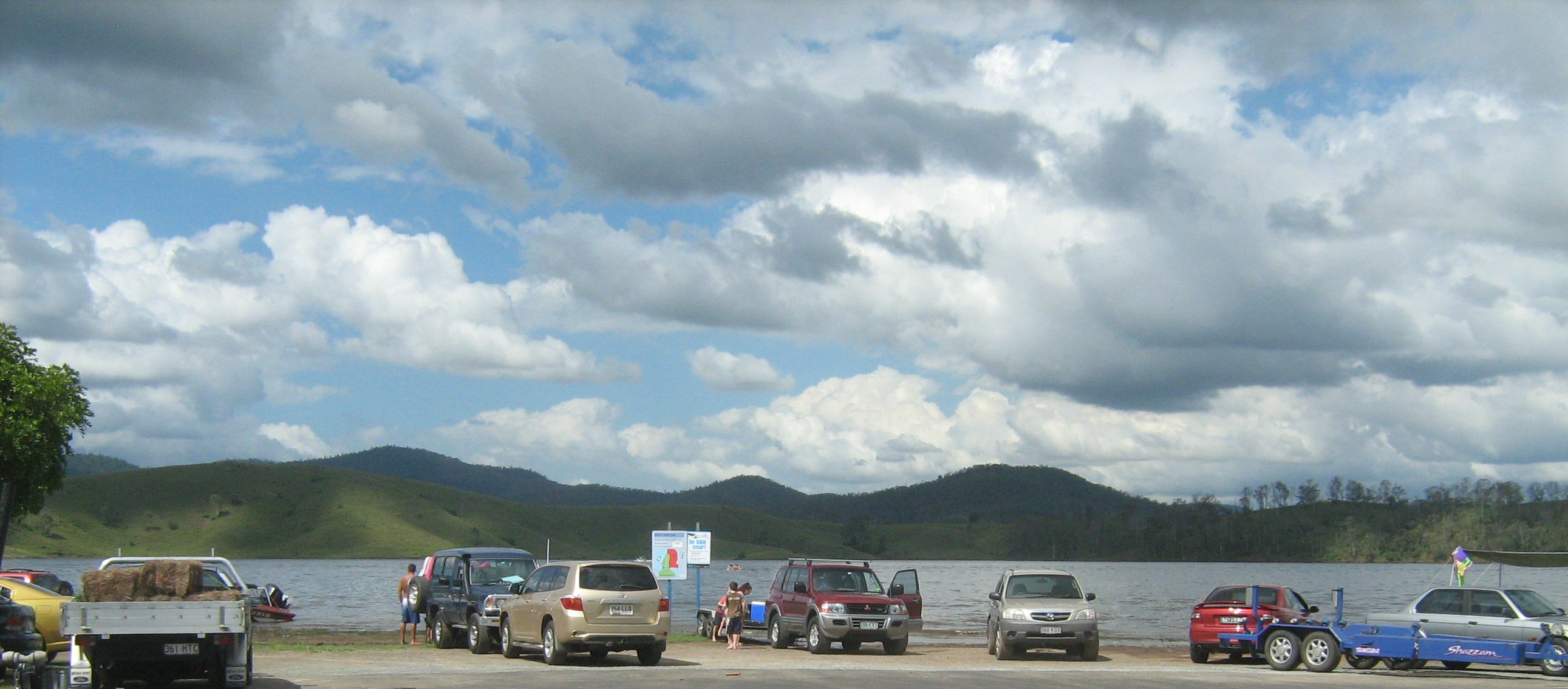
Camping near Lake Somerset.

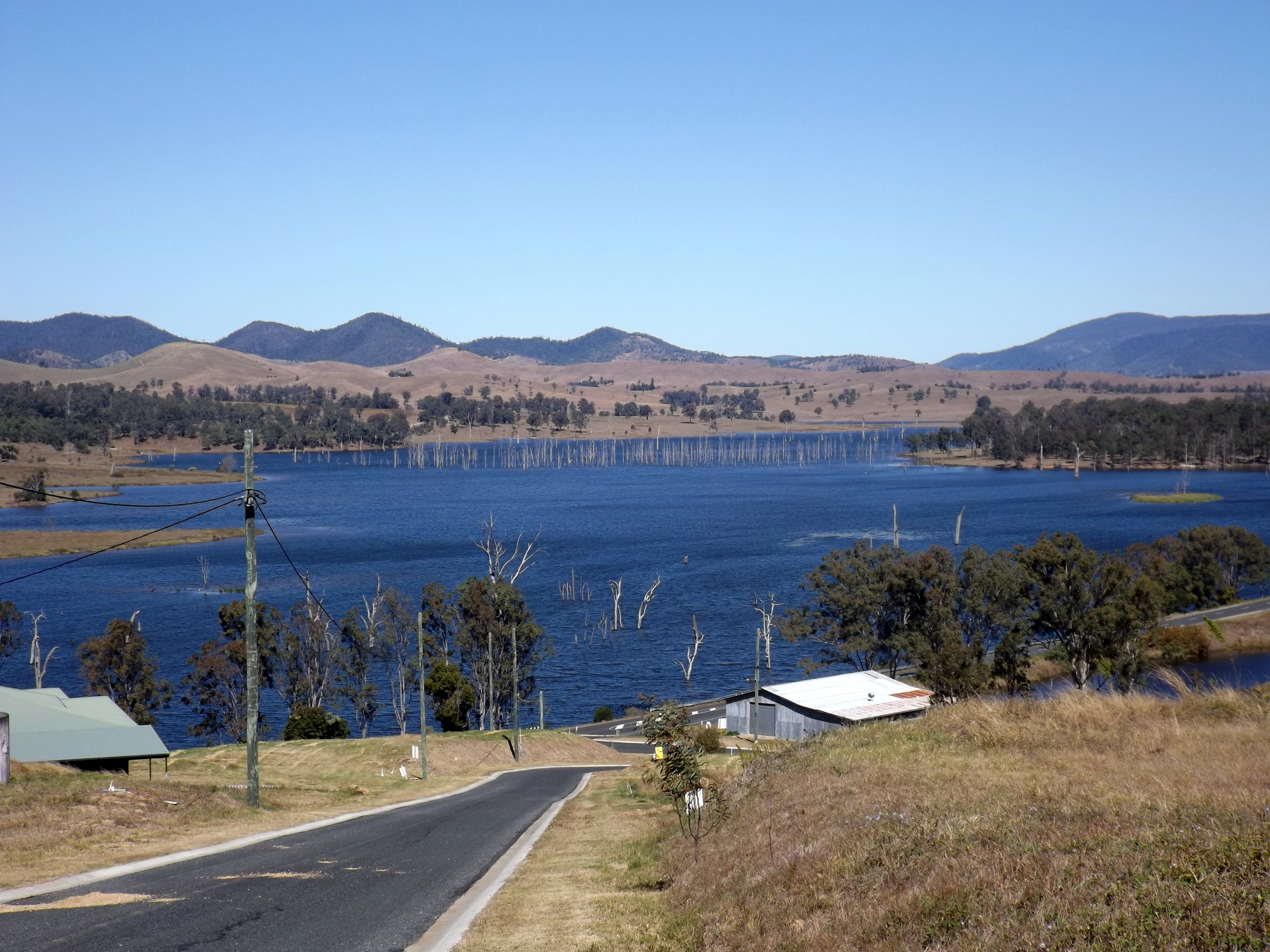
Lake Somerset at 100% capacity, Villeneuve, 2015

The dam is approximately 115 kilometres (71 mi) northwest of Brisbane in the Somerset Region and 80 kilometres (50 mi) north of Ipswich.

The concrete dam structure is 50 metres (160 ft) high and 305 metres (1,001 ft) long. The 203-thousand-cubic-metre (7.2×10^{6} cu ft) dam wall holds back the 904,000-megalitre (199×10^{9} imp gal; 239×10^{9} US gal) reservoir when at full capacity. However, only 380,000 megalitres (84×10^{9} imp gal; 100×10^{9} US gal) is used for water supply and the remainder used for flood mitigation. From a catchment area of 1,330 square kilometres (510 sq mi) that includes much of the western slopes of the D'Aguilar National Park, the dam creates Lake Somerset at an elevation of 108 m (354 ft) above sea level, with a surface area of 4,350 hectares (10,700 acres). The gated spillway has a discharge capacity of 4,650 cubic metres per second (164,000 cu ft/s). Built under the supervision of the Bureau of Industry, management of the dam was transferred to SEQ Water in July 2008 as part of a water security project in the South East Queensland region, known as the South East Queensland Water Grid. A small 4 megawatts (5,400 hp) hydroelectric power station is located adjacent to the dam wall.

A water level of 90% is the optimum capacity for keeping evaporation rates to a minimum. Dam operators discharge water into the Wivenhoe Dam downstream to hold Somerset at this level when inflows are occurring.

The dam is home to the Somerset Dam Power Station.

=== Construction ===
The site was first suggested for the location of a dam by Henry Somerset, the owner of Caboonbah Homestead, after the 1893 Brisbane floods caused severe damage to Brisbane River valley residents downstream. A commission of enquiry recommended Stanley Gorge as the site for a dam in 1928, but it was not until 1933 when Brisbane was in a severe drought, that the Forgan Smith Labor Government adopted the reservoir's construction as a major job creation project to counter job losses caused by the Great Depression.

Construction began in 1935. Worker's cottages had to be built and other facilities were constructed to attract 1,000 construction workers and their families to the area. By 1942 the dam was almost complete when workers were diverted to the war effort, with many being redeployed to construct the Cairncross Dockyard in Brisbane. Work on the dam recommenced in 1948. Opened in 1953 when structural work was finished, it was not until 1958 that the dam was officially named after Henry Somerset and the next year before all work related to the dam, including the hydroelectric power station was complete.

== Recreation ==
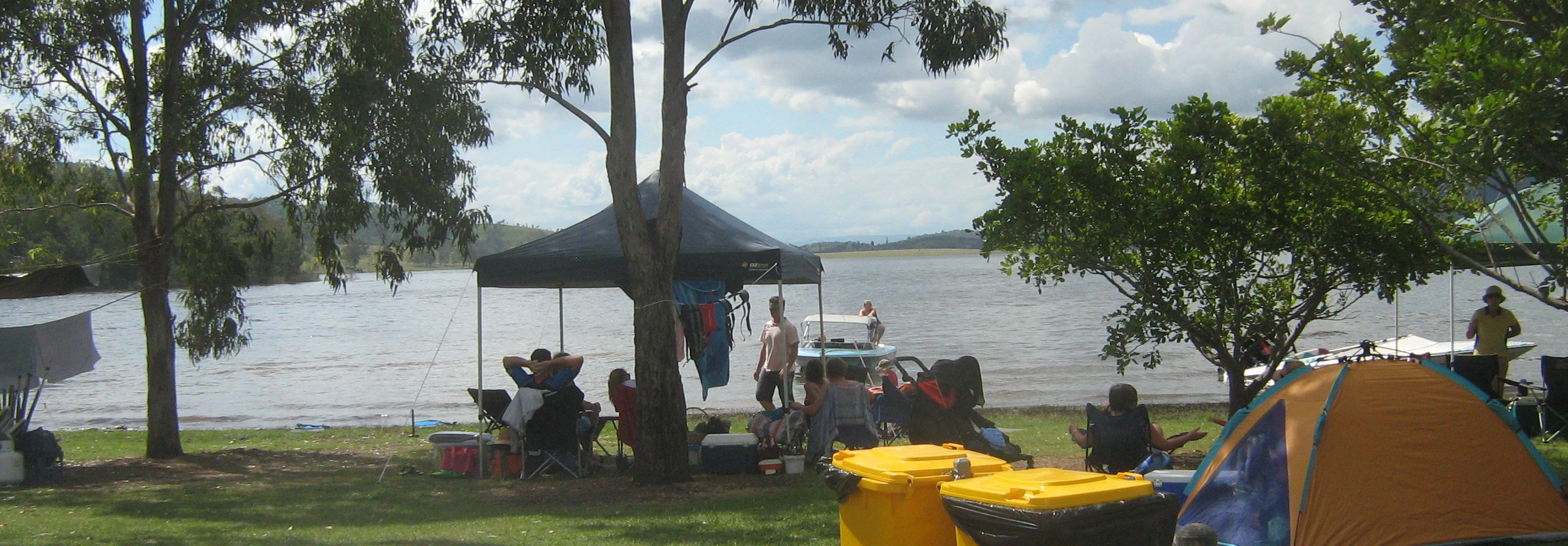
Camping at Lake Somerset.

There are two public access areas on Somerset Dam, Kirkleigh and The Spit. Both locations have multi-lane, concrete boat ramps with facilities for day-trippers. Camping is permitted and caravans are catered for at Kirkleigh and below the dam wall at Somerset Park in the small town of Somerset Dam. During busy periods the two camping locations can be filled to capacity with room for a maximum of 2,200 campers at Kirkleigh and 800 at Somerset Park. Lake Somerset Holiday Park's Kirkleigh campground also features cabin accommodation at the waterfront and direct access to the dam from a grassy spit. The dam contains 30 kilometres (19 mi) of navigable waterway.

=== Fishing ===
The lake is a popular fishing destination, one of the top five fishing spots in the state. Fish species found in the dam include Australian bass, golden perch, silver perch, bony bream, eel-tailed catfish, spangled perch, Mary River cod, snub nosed gar, Queensland lungfish and saratoga. A stocked impoundment permit is required to fish in the dam.

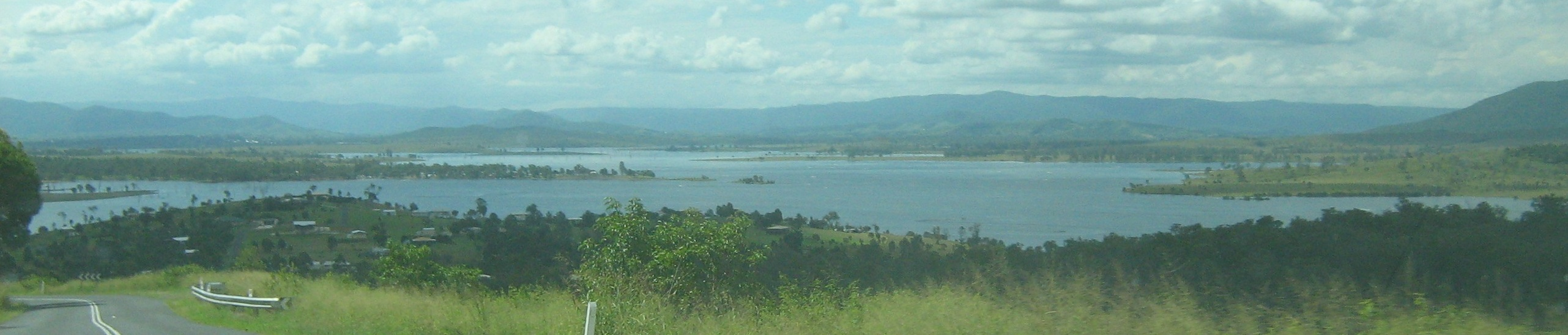
A view of Lake Somerset

== Engineering heritage award ==
The dam is listed as an Engineering Heritage National Landmark by Engineers Australia as part of its Engineering Heritage Recognition Program.

== See also ==
- List of dams in Queensland
