= Stanmore, Queensland =

Stanmore Queensland
- Coordinates: 26.8938°S 152.7913°E
- Population: 454 (2021 census)
  - Density: 9.098/km^{2} (23.56/sq mi)
- Postcode(s): 4514
- Area: 49.9 km^{2} (19.3 sq mi)
- Time zone: AEST (UTC+10:00)
- Location: 10.0 km (6 mi) N of Woodford; 27.4 km (17 mi) ENE of Kilcoy; 34.9 km (22 mi) NW of Caboolture; 92.4 km (57 mi) NNW of Brisbane CBD
- LGA(s): City of Moreton Bay
- State electorate(s): Pumicestone
- Federal division(s): Longman
Suburbs around Stanmore:
Bellthorpe	Booroobin; Cedarton	Commissioners Flat
Stony Creek	Stanmore	Woodford
Woodford	Woodford	Woodford

Stanmore is a rural locality in the City of Moreton Bay, Queensland, Australia. In the 2021 census, Stanmore had a population of 454 people.

== Geography ==
Stanmore is 70 kilometres (43 mi) north of Brisbane in Queensland, Australia. The Stanley River passes through Stanmore and marks part of the northern boundary. Bellthorpe State Forest occupies a section of the north. Kilcoy–Beerwah Road runs through from south to north-east.

== History ==
The locality derives its name from a grazing property Stanmore established by George Adophus Mason by 1875 and operated by him until his death in 1936.

Stanmore Provisional School opened in 1891. On 1 January 1909, it became Stanmore State School. It closed on 31 December 1972. The school was at 491-495 Kilcoy Beerwah Road (26.8935°S 152.7818°E).

In 1912 part of the Stanmore property was subdivided and sold.

== Demographics ==
In the 2011 census, Stanmore recorded a population of 481 people, 50.5% female and 49.5% male. The median age of the Stanmore population was 39 years, 2 years above the national median of 37. 86.5% of people living in Stanmore were born in Australia. The other top responses for country of birth were England 3.5%, United States of America 1.5%, Scotland 1%, Cambodia 0.8%, South Africa 0.8%. 95.6% of people spoke only English at home; the next most common languages were 0.6% Afrikaans, 0.6% Khmer, 0.6% Maltese, 0.6% Italian.

In the 2016 census, Stanmore had a population of 437 people.

In the 2021 census, Stanmore had a population of 454 people.

== Education ==
There are no schools in Stanmore. The nearest government primary schools are Woodford State School in neighbouring Woodford to the south-east, Peachester State School in Peachester to the north-east, and Glass House Mountains State School in Glass House Mountains to the east.

The nearest government secondary schools are Woodford State School in Woodford (to Year 10), Maleny State High School (to Year 12) in Maleny to the north-east, Beerwah State High School (to Year 12) in Beerwah to the east, and Kilcoy State High School (to Year 12) in Kilcoy to the south-west.
