= Kilcoy–Beerwah Road =

Road in Queensland, Australia

Kilcoy–Beerwah Road Queensland

General information
- Type: Road
- Length: 30.4 km (19 mi)
- Route number(s): Entire route

Major junctions
- West end: D'Aguilar Highway, Woodford
- Commissioners Flat Road; Maleny–Stanley River Road; Bald Knob Road; Old Gympie Road; Peachester Road; Roberts Road
- East end: Glass House Mountains Road (Steve Irwin Way) Beerwah

Location(s)
- Major suburbs: Stanmore, Cedarton, Peachester

Kilcoy–Beerwah Road is a continuous 30.4-kilometre (18.9 mi) road route in the Moreton Bay and Sunshine Coast local government areas of Queensland, Australia. It is designated as part of State Route 6. It is a state-controlled regional road (number 492). It is part of a route that carries tourist traffic from the New England Highway to the Bruce Highway.

== Route description ==
Kilcoy–Beerwah Road commences as State Route 6 at an intersection with the D'Aguilar Highway in Woodford. It runs north-east and north through Stanmore and Cedarton, passing the exit to Commissioners Flat Road to the south-east. It then climbs the western slope of the Conondale Range and passes the exit to Maleny–Stanley River Road to the north-west. Next it turns east as it enters Peachester, where the name changes to Peachester Road. It continues east through Peachester, crossing the Stanley River, passing the exit to Bald Knob Road to the north and another exit to Commissioners Flat Road to the south-west.

The road then turns south-east, descending the range as it enters Beerwah, and crosses Old Gympie Road before entering the village. As it enters the village it turns south on a bypass of the Beerwah CBD, leaving Peachester Road which continues east, and resuming its official name. It then turns south-east, crossing Roberts Road at a roundabout, and ends at a four-way intersection with Glass House Mountains Road (Steve Irwin Way). State Route 6 turns north towards Landsborough, and Roys Road runs east to the Bruce Highway.

Land use along the road is mainly rural.

== Road condition ==
The road is fully sealed, and most of it is two-lane road. 1-kilometre (0.62 mi) of the road is steeper than 10%, and a further 3.1-kilometre (1.9 mi) is between 5 and 10%. The highest elevation along the road is 299-metre (981 ft) and the lowest is 28.8-metre (94 ft).

=== Upgrade project ===
A project to upgrade the intersection with Old Gympie Road, at a cost of $5.5 million, was completed in August 2021.

== History ==
In 1841 the Archer brothers established Durundur Station along the Stanley River, near where Woodford now stands. In 1877, 10,800 acres (4,400 ha) were resumed from the Durundur pastoral run and offered for selection on 19 April 1877.

Stanmore pastoral run was established before 1885. In 1912 part of the Stanmore property was subdivided and sold.

Cedarton was originally called Pointon's Pocket, after an early settler. He was a bullocky who harvested large quantities of cedar from the western slopes of the range. By 1905 land in the area was available for selection. Prior to 1909, when the railway reached Woodford, timber was taken by bullock dray to either Woodford or Caboolture for milling. Bullocks were still used to take timber to Woodford for some time before they were replaced by motor trucks.

The town of Peachester was surveyed in 1888. Early industries included dairying and timber felling.

European settlement at Beerwah began in 1877, with timber cutting and land clearing, followed by fruit growing and other forms of agriculture.

== Major intersections ==
All distances are from Google Maps. The road is within the Moreton Bay and Sunshine Coast local government areas.

LGA	Location	km	mi	Destinations	Notes
Moreton Bay	Woodford	0	0.0	D'Aguilar Highway – north–west – Kilcoy – south–east – Caboolture	Western end of Kilcoy–Beerwah Road (State Route 6).
Moreton Bay	Cedarton	10.6	6.6	Commissioners Flat Road – south–east – Commissioners Flat	Road continues north.
Sunshine Coast	Cedarton / Peachester midpoint	13.5	8.4	Maleny–Stanley River Road – north–west – Maleny	Road turns east and name changes to Peachester Road.
Sunshine Coast	Peachester	20.3	12.6	Bald Knob Road – north – Bald Knob	Road continues south–east.
Sunshine Coast	Peachester	20.9	13.0	Commissioners Flat Road – south–west – Commissioners Flat	Road continues south–east, then east.
Sunshine Coast	Beerwah	27.6	17.1	Old Gympie Road – north – Landsborough – south–west – Glass House Mountains	Road continues south–east.
Sunshine Coast	Beerwah	29.2	18.1	Peachester Road – east – Beerwah CBD	Road turns south and name changes back to Kilcoy–Beerwah Road.
Sunshine Coast	Beerwah	29.8	18.5	Roberts Road – north–east – Beerwah CBD south–west – Beerwah	Road continues south–east.
Sunshine Coast	Beerwah	30.4	18.9	Glass House Mountains Road (Steve Irwin Way) – north – Landsborough (No shield) Glass House Mountains Road (Steve Irwin Way) – south – Glass House Mountains.	Eastern end of Kilcoy–Beerwah Road. Road continues east as Roys Road.
1.000 mi = 1.609 km; 1.000 km = 0.621 mi: Route transition

== See also ==
- List of road routes in Queensland
- List of numbered roads in Queensland
