= Bellthorpe, Queensland =

Bellthorpe Queensland
- Coordinates: 26.8575°S 152.7233°E
- Population: 108 (2021 census)
  - Density: 1.456/km^{2} (3.770/sq mi)
- Postcode(s): 4514
- Area: 74.2 km^{2} (28.6 sq mi)
- Time zone: AEST (UTC+10:00)
- Location: 44.5 km (28 mi) NW of Caboolture; 56.3 km (35 mi) W of Caloundra; 92.7 km (58 mi) NNW of Brisbane CBD
- LGA(s): City of Moreton Bay
- State electorate(s): Glass House
- Federal division(s): Fisher
Suburbs around Bellthorpe:
Sandy Creek	Conondale	Booroobin
Sandy Creek	Bellthorpe	Stanmore
Sandy Creek	Stony Creek	Woodford

Bellthorpe is a rural locality in the City of Moreton Bay, Queensland, Australia. In the 2021 census, Bellthorpe had a population of 108 people.

Much of the area is protected within the Bellthorpe National Park.

== Geography ==
The south of Bellthorpe lies within the Stanley River catchment. In the north Kilcoy Creek flows into the Mary River.

Bellthorpe West is a neighbourhood in the north-west of the locality (26°49′23″S 152°40′46″E).

== History ==
The locality was possibly named after politician Joshua Thomas Bell who was the Secretary for Public Lands in the Queensland Government at the time the district became available for selection.

Bellthorpe Provisional School opened on 22 April 1919, closing in 1922 due to low student numbers. However, it re-opened in 1923 and became Bellthorpe State School in 1927. It closed in 1969.

Bellthorpe West Provisional School opened on 21 March 1955, becoming Bellthorpe West State School in 1959. It also closed in 1969.

== Demographics ==
In the 2016 census, Bellthorpe had a population of 124 people.

In the 2021 census, Bellthorpe had a population of 108 people.

== Education ==
There are no schools in Bellthorpe. The nearest government primary schools are Woodford State School in neighbouring Woodford to the south-east and Peachester State School in Peachester to the east. The nearest government secondary schools are Woodford State School (to Year 10), Maleny State High School (to Year 12) in Maleny to the north-east, Beerwah State High School in Beerwah to the east, and Kilcoy State High School in Kilcoy to the south-west.
