= Cedarton =

Cedarton Queensland
- Coordinates: 26.8619°S 152.8099°E
- Population: 129 (2021 census)
  - Density: 11.32/km^{2} (29.31/sq mi)
- Postcode(s): 4514
- Area: 11.4 km^{2} (4.4 sq mi)
- Time zone: AEST (UTC+10:00)
- Location: 39.2 km (24 mi) NW of Caboolture; 40.7 km (25 mi) W of Caloundra; 87.4 km (54 mi) NNW of Brisbane CBD
- LGA(s): City of Moreton Bay
- State electorate(s): Glass House
- Federal division(s): Longman
Suburbs around Cedarton:
Booroobin	Booroobin	Peachester
Stanmore	Cedarton	Commissioners Flat
Stanmore	Stanmore	Stanmore

Cedarton is a rural locality in the City of Moreton Bay, Queensland, Australia. In the 2021 census, Cedarton had a population of 129 people.

== Geography ==
The Stanley River forms the southern and part of the eastern boundary of Cedarton. Kilcoy–Beerwah Road runs through from south-west to north-east.

== Demographics ==
In the 2016 census, Cedarton had a population of 118 people.

In the 2021 census, Cedarton had a population of 129 people.

== Education ==
There are no schools in Cedarton. The nearest government primary school is Peachester State School in neighbouring Peachester to the north-west. The nearest government secondary schools are Woodford State School (to Year 10) in Woodford to the south, Beerwah State High School (to Year 12) in Beerwah to the east, and Maleny State High School (to Year 12) in Maleny to the north.
