= Crohamhurst, Queensland =

Crohamhurst
- Suburb
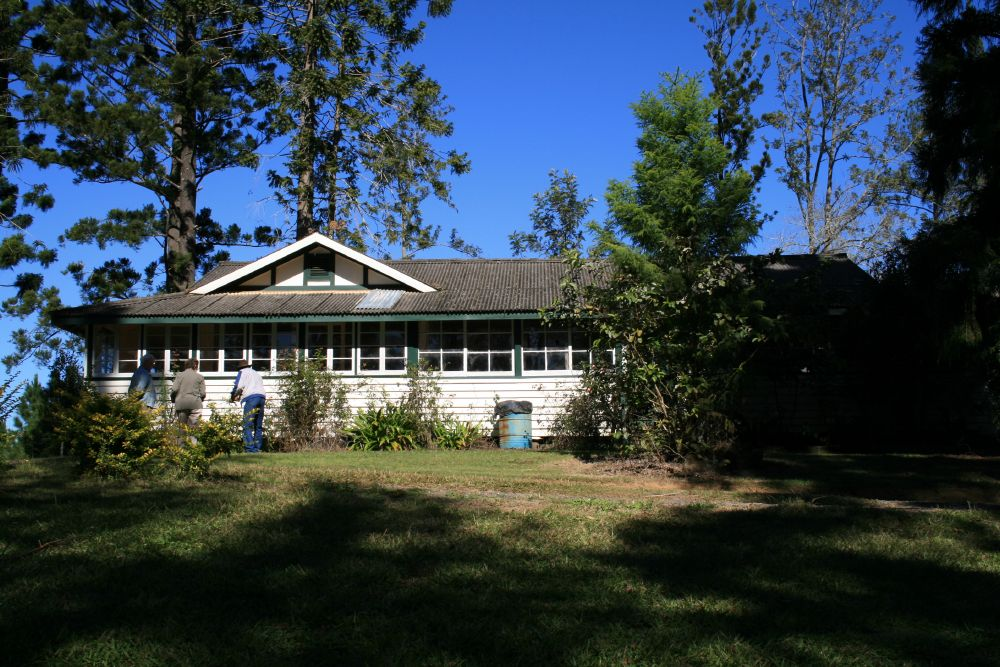
- Former Crohamhurst Observatory, 2007

- Interactive map of Crohamhurst
- Coordinates: 26.8083°S 152.8611°E
- Country: Australia
- State: Queensland
- LGA: Sunshine Coast Region
- Location: 13.8 km (8.6 mi) NW of Beerwah; 34.7 km (21.6 mi) W of Caloundra; 41.1 km (25.5 mi) SW of Maroochydore; 89.3 km (55.5 mi) N of Brisbane

Government
  - State electorate: Glass House
  - Federal division: Fisher

Area
  - Total: 20.5 km^{2} (7.9 sq mi)
- Elevation: 200 m (660 ft)

Population
  - Total: 219 (2021 census)
  - Density: 10.68/km^{2} (27.67/sq mi)
- Time zone: UTC+10:00 (AEST)
- Postcode: 4519
- Mean max temp: 24.8 °C (76.6 °F)
- Mean min temp: 13.4 °C (56.1 °F)
- Annual rainfall: 1,834.7 mm (72.23 in)
Suburbs around Crohamhurst
Wootha	Maleny	Bald Knob
Peachester	Crohamhurst	Bald Knob
Peachester	Peachester	Peachester

Crohamhurst is a rural locality in the Sunshine Coast Region, Queensland, Australia. In the 2021 census, Crohamhurst had a population of 219 people.

In 1893, Crohamhurst recorded 907 mm (35.7 in) of rain in one day during the passage of a cyclone, which is the record highest 24-hour rainfall in Australia.

== Geography ==
Most of the southern boundary is marked by the Stanley River. The north of Crohamhurst is protected within a section of the Glass House Mountains National Park. Also in the area is the Crohamhurst State Forest.

Crohamhurst has the following mountains:

- Candle Mountain (26.8132°S 152.8540°E) 293 metres (961 ft)
- Mount Blanc (26.8143°S 152.8785°E) 227 metres (745 ft)

=== Climate ===
Crohamhurst has a moderate humid subtropical climate (Köppen: Cfa) with warm, very wet summers and mild, drier winters. The wettest recorded day was 3 February 1893 with 907.0 mm (35.71 in) of rainfall. This is the highest daily rainfall recorded in all of Australia. Extreme temperatures ranged from 40.3 °C (104.5 °F) on 19 November 1968 to −1.5 °C (29.3 °F) on 2 August 1982.

Climate data for Crohamhurst (26.81°S 152.87°E) (200 m (660 ft) AMSL) (1892-2004)
Month	Jan	Feb	Mar	Apr	May	Jun	Jul	Aug	Sep	Oct	Nov	Dec	Year
Record high °C (°F)	39.5 (103.1)	37.7 (99.9)	37.2 (99.0)	33.5 (92.3)	30.0 (86.0)	27.5 (81.5)	30.8 (87.4)	30.5 (86.9)	34.5 (94.1)	39.0 (102.2)	40.3 (104.5)	40.0 (104.0)	40.3 (104.5)
Mean daily maximum °C (°F)	28.7 (83.7)	28.0 (82.4)	26.9 (80.4)	25.0 (77.0)	22.0 (71.6)	19.8 (67.6)	19.6 (67.3)	21.2 (70.2)	23.8 (74.8)	26.1 (79.0)	28.0 (82.4)	29.0 (84.2)	24.8 (76.7)
Mean daily minimum °C (°F)	18.8 (65.8)	18.8 (65.8)	17.6 (63.7)	14.3 (57.7)	11.1 (52.0)	8.1 (46.6)	7.1 (44.8)	7.6 (45.7)	10.6 (51.1)	13.6 (56.5)	16.0 (60.8)	17.8 (64.0)	13.4 (56.2)
Record low °C (°F)	11.4 (52.5)	12.0 (53.6)	10.0 (50.0)	5.7 (42.3)	1.7 (35.1)	−1.1 (30.0)	−1.4 (29.5)	−1.5 (29.3)	1.0 (33.8)	2.5 (36.5)	5.5 (41.9)	8.0 (46.4)	−1.5 (29.3)
Average precipitation mm (inches)	264.2 (10.40)	306.1 (12.05)	276.2 (10.87)	166.8 (6.57)	133.2 (5.24)	101.3 (3.99)	83.1 (3.27)	55.9 (2.20)	56.9 (2.24)	100.6 (3.96)	120.3 (4.74)	176.5 (6.95)	1,834.7 (72.23)
Average precipitation days (≥ 0.2 mm)	15.9	16.6	18.2	14.6	12.8	10.8	9.8	8.7	8.7	10.4	11.5	13.4	151.4
Source: Bureau of Meteorology (1892-2004)

== History ==
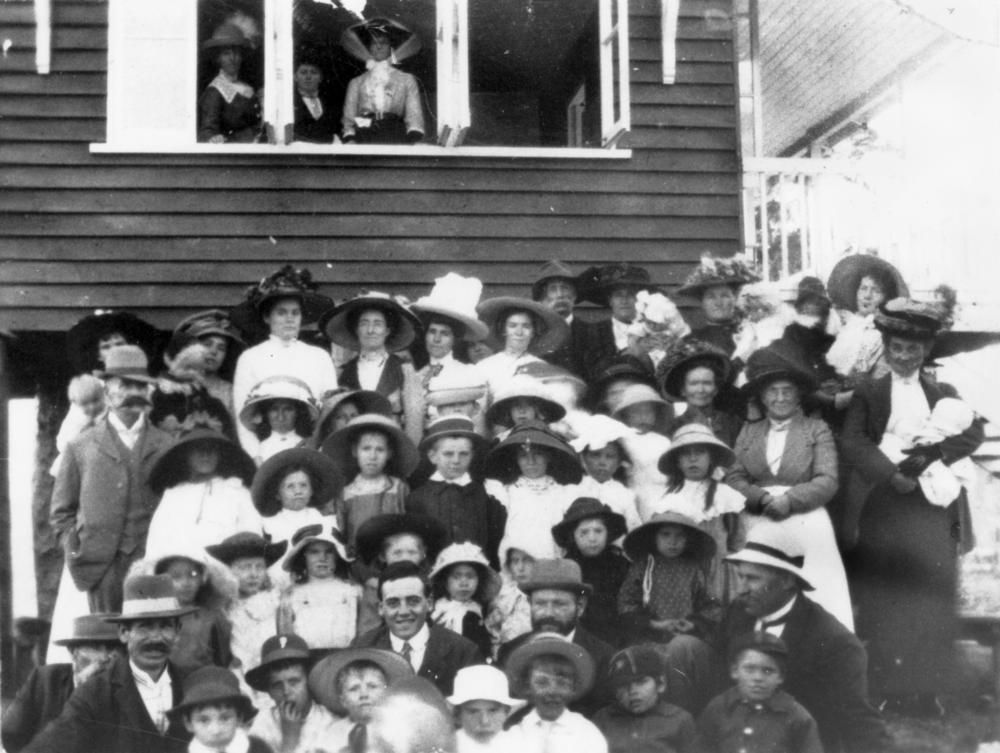
Group at Crohamhurst State School

The name Crohamhurst comes from the name of the farm Crohamhurst established by Owen and Emilie/Amelia Jones who immigrated from Surrey, England. The Jones family named their farm after a property called Crohamhurst (also written Croham Hurst) owned by Lord Goschen in Surrey.

The son of Owen and Emilie/Amelia Jones was Inigo Owen Jones, the long-range weather forecaster who established the now heritage-listed Crohamhurst Observatory on the farm. His theories about weather cycles related to sunspot activity.

In 1893, Inigo Jones recorded 907 mm (35.7 in) of rain in one day at Crohamhurst during the passage of a cyclone, which is the record highest 24-hour rainfall in Australia. He had just resigned as an employee of the Queensland Meteorological Service Inigo Owen Jones at that time. The 20-year-old Jones, later became a controversial climate forecaster, believing that weather patterns were influenced related to sunspot activityand electromagnetic effects of far away planets.

Crohamhurst State School opened on 21 July 1913. It closed on 14 October 1960. It was located on Crohamhurst Road (26.8104°S 152.8717°E) on land donated by Owen Jones (father of Inigo Owen Jones) which is now within the Crohamhurst State Forest, land donated by Inigo Owen Jones. It closed on 14 October 1960. The location of the school is marked with a sign by the road.

Inigo Jones inherited the property from his parents, and in 1950 he gave the farm to the Queensland Government provided he and his wife could continue to live there until their deaths. The observatory part of the land is now heritage-listed and the rest of the land (including the school which closed about 1960) is now the Crohamhurst State Forest.

== Demographics ==
In the 2011 census, Crohamhurst had a population of 203 people.

In the 2016 census, Crohamhurst had a population of 217 people.

In the 2021 census, Crohamhurst had a population of 219 people.

== Heritage listings ==
Crohamhurst has a number of heritage-listed sites, including:

- former Crohamhurst Observatory, 131 Crohamhurst Road (26.8098°S 152.8697°E)

== Education ==
There are no schools in Crohamhurst. The nearest government primary school is Peachester State School in neighbouring Peachester to the south. The nearest government secondary school is Beerwah State High School in Beerwah to the south-east.

== Facilities ==
Despite the name, Peachester Cemetery is on Cemetery Road in Crohamhurst (26.8202°S 152.8722°E).

== Notable residents ==
- Inigo Owen Jones, long-range weather forecaster
