= Bellthorpe National Park =

National park in Queensland, Australia

- IUCN category II (national park)
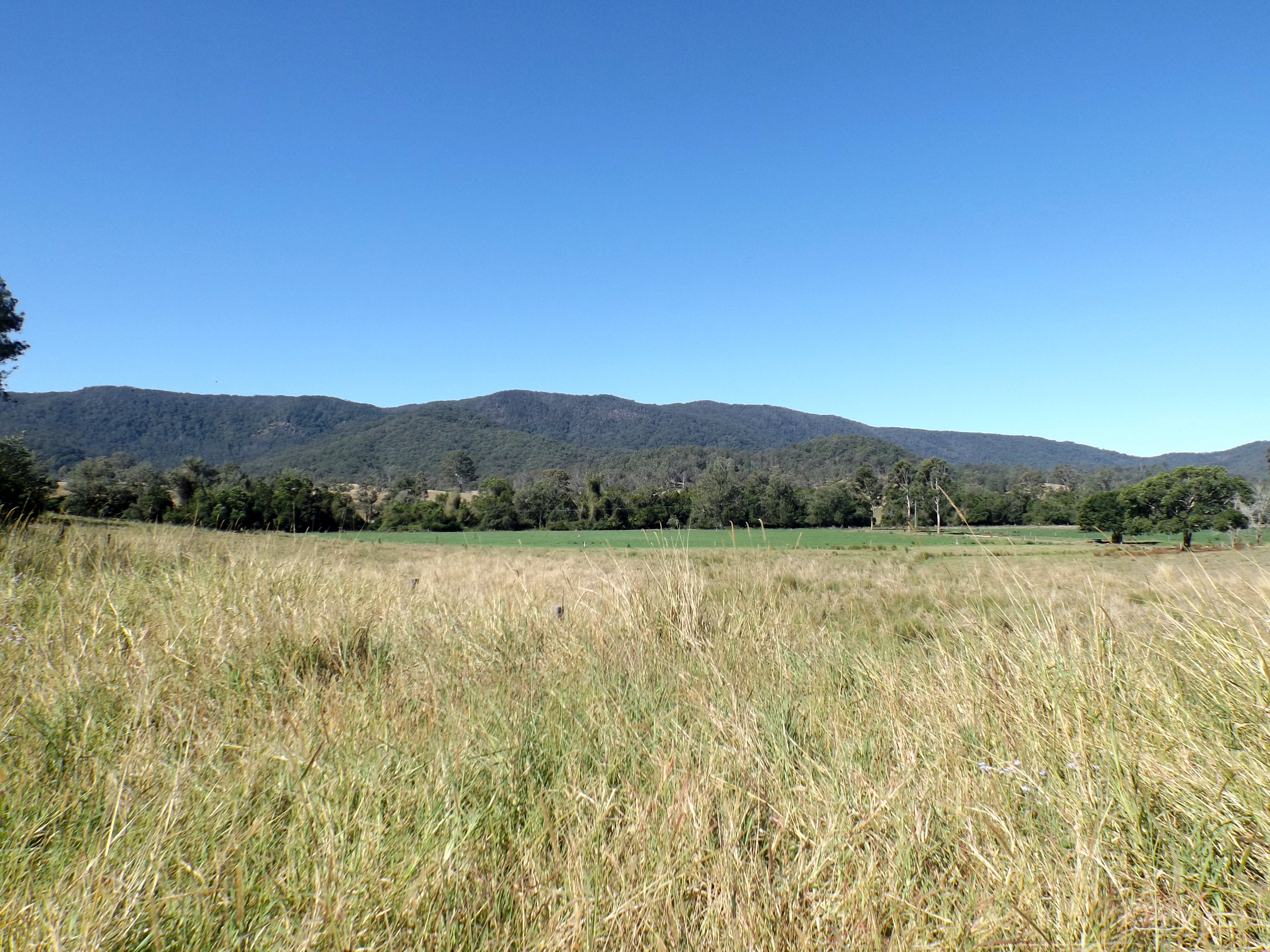
- The range in the background is in the national park.

- Location within Queensland
- Location: Queensland
- Nearest city: Woodford
- Coordinates: 26°51′57″S 152°41′21″E
- Area: 75.5 km^{2} (29.2 sq mi)
- Governing body: Queensland Parks and Wildlife Service
- Website: nprsr.qld.gov.au/parks/bellthorpe/index.html

Bellthorpe National Park is a national park located in Bellthorpe, Booroobin and Sandy Creek in both the City of Moreton Bay and Somerset Region of South East Queensland, Australia. The park preserves eucalypt forest and rainforest of the southern Conondale Range. Parts of the national park were previously known as Bellthor.

The rugged landscape at Bellthorpe falls within the catchment of Stony Creek, a tributary of the Stanley River. Along the waterway are several small waterfalls, cascades and a rock pool. The park also protects lands within the Brisbane River valley and Mary River catchments.

Remnants of a once prosperous timber cutting industry remain today. Horse riding, mountain biking and bushwalking attract visitors.

== Facilities ==
Although camping is not permitted a day-use area with wheelchair access is provided. Stony Creek picnic area has toilets, picnic tables and wood barbecues. There are no marked walking trails.

== See also ==
- Protected areas of Queensland
