= Peachester Public Dip =

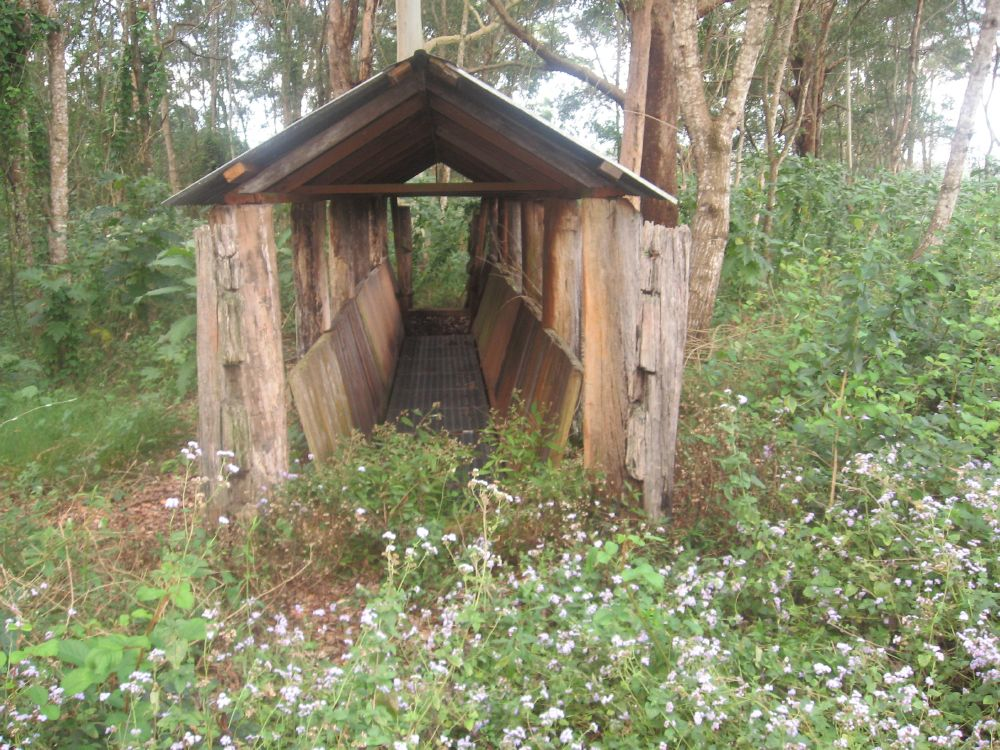
- Peachester Public Dip

- Location within Queensland Location within Australia
- 26.8352°S 152.8695°E
- Location: Peachester Road, Peachester, Sunshine Coast Region, Queensland, Australia

History
- Design period: 1900–1914 (early 20th century)
- Built: 1915
- Built for: Landsborough Shire Council

Queensland Heritage Register
- Official name: Peachester Public Dip
- Type: state heritage (built)
- Designated: 3 April 2009
- Reference no.: 602705
- Significant period: 1915–70s
- Significant components: dip

Peachester Public Dip is a heritage-listed cattle dip at Peachester Road, Peachester, Sunshine Coast Region, Queensland, Australia. It was built in 1915. It was added to the Queensland Heritage Register on 3 April 2009.

== History ==
Peachester Public Dip is a concrete formed cattle dip framed with slab posts and a sawn timber roof clad in corrugated iron sheeting. It dates from 1915 when it replaced an earlier timber dip built by Landsborough Shire Council on the site, which had been reserved as a Stock Dip Reserve in November 1910. These dips were erected in response to the spread of cattle tick into Queensland which threatened the cattle industry throughout the State and dairying in south-east Queensland.

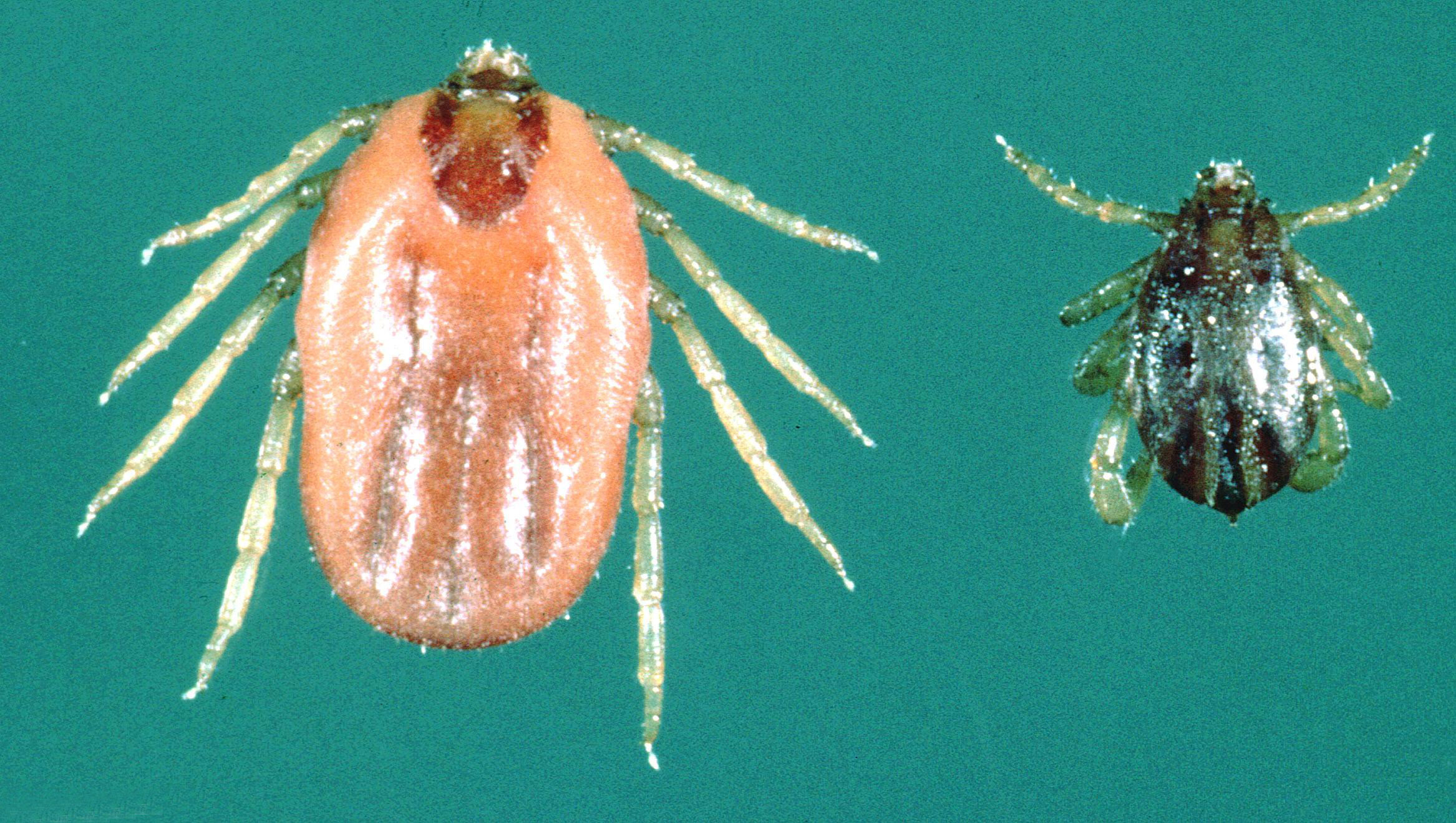
Boophilus microplus: female and male

Cattle tick (Boophilus microplus) was probably introduced into Darwin with cattle from Indonesia in the early 1870s. The tick spread south into other parts of the continent and became a major problem for the cattle industry. In 1891 cattle tick reached Queensland bringing with it tick fever caused by three types of blood-borne bacteria. By the mid-1890s the tick had spread quickly to the south causing heavy losses among herds. This heightened the need for stock inspection and by the end of the century there were more than 30 inspectors stationed at 28 locations throughout Queensland.

The means of combating tick-fever caused by cattle-tick resulted from research by Charles Joseph Pound who began investigating "redwater disease of cattle" in the gulf district in 1894. He established that redwater or tick fever was confined to bovines and that the disease was readily transmissible by ticks and identified the genus of tick vector Boophilus. In the mid-1890s, Pound, as Queensland Government Bacteriologist, undertook tick fever inoculation studies. These, the first such trials in Australia, established a methodology and dosage that is still used worldwide. A cattle dip was built at the former Indooroopilly Sheep Quarantine Grounds in 1898 and until 1905 was used by the Department of Agriculture to establish a suitable dipping preparation and procedure for the destruction of cattle ticks.

The Queensland government's response to cattle tick-borne tick fever was dipping cattle in infected areas and creating designated tick-free zones with restricted movement of stock from tick-affected to tick-free areas. The Stock Act 1915 regulated the movement of cattle and empowered Stock Inspectors to enforce tick control measures. Government cattle dips were established at the entry points between tick-infested and tick-free zones. Tick gates were located at various points on the New South Wales-Queensland border.

Between the late 1880s and the 1900s the dairy industry in Queensland grew rapidly. Queensland's total number of dairy cattle in 1898 was 80,000; by 1910, this had grown to 350,000. Initially, dairying was concentrated in south-east Queensland and by the mid-1900s it was emerging as the principal rural industry of the North Coast area (now known as the Sunshine Coast). Major areas of development were along the fertile valleys of the main rivers and tributaries.

At Peachester, dairying became the major occupation in the early 1900s. From 1907 all Peachester cream was transported to the Beerwah railway station and railed to the Caboolture Butter Factory. Before that the small amount of cream produced went to the Silverwood Butter Factory in Gympie.

Following World War I, dairying in Queensland entered a boom period. By the 1930s, when dairy production peaked, it had emerged as the second largest primary industry in Queensland accounting for 20% of primary production. Dairying was regarded as the principal primary industry in the southeast and continued to expand.

At the local level, in response to a request from Peachester dairy farmers, the Landsborough Shire Council built a wooden dip at the site of the Peachester Stock Dip Reserve. This was replaced by a concrete one built c. 1915 by a Landsborough man who built several other dips on private properties in the area.

A caretaker was appointed to oversee the dip. He was responsible for "charging" the dip with the mixture of arsenic and soda that was used. Water was carted from the nearby Stanley River to keep it filled. One day per week, usually Saturday, was set aside for dipping and a fee of two pence per head was charged. As more farmers built their own dips, the Peachester Public Dip fell into disuse.

Although the older smaller public plunge dips such as Peachester have fallen into disuse, large public dips along the line between the tick-infested and tick-free areas in Queensland are still operational. From 1935 tick resistance to arsenic led to the use of other chemicals in dips; initially DDT, then organophosphates, and carbamates. Research undertaken by C.J. Pound and later the Commonwealth Scientific and Industrial Research Organisation (CSIRO), led to the development of various tick vaccines and antibiotics to treat infected animals. With the development of a successful anti-tick vaccine, inoculation against ticks became available from the 1990s. Today farmers and graziers in tick-susceptible areas often use spray- rather than plunge dips, in conjunction with tick-resistant cattle breeds, pasture rotation and vaccination to control cattle ticks.

== Description ==
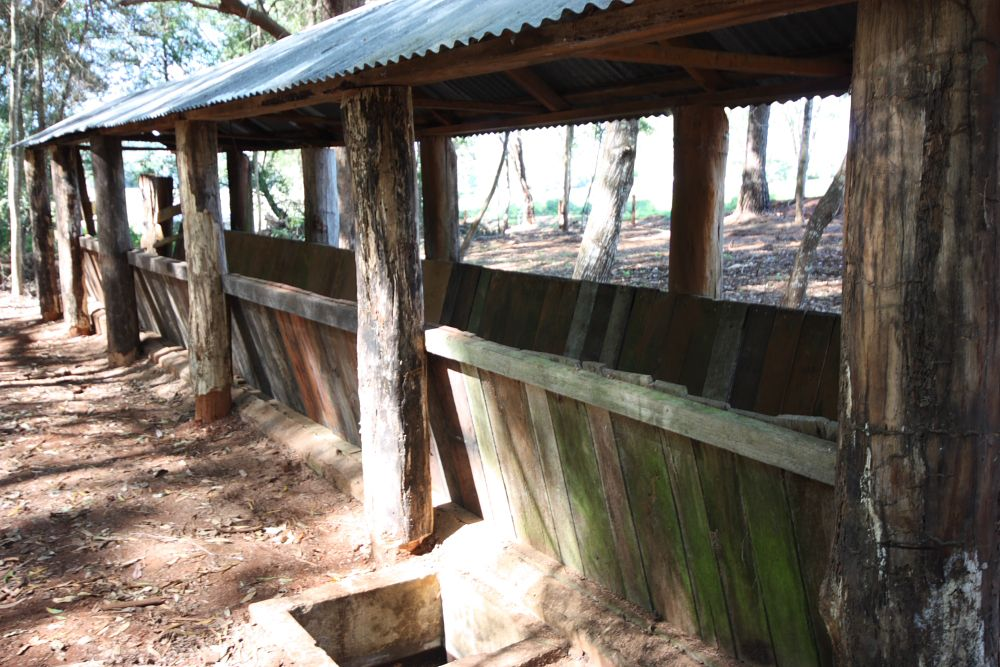
Side view of the dip, 2010

The Peachester Public cattle dip with remnant yards is located amongst dense scrub to the north-west of Peachester on the northern side of Peachester Road.

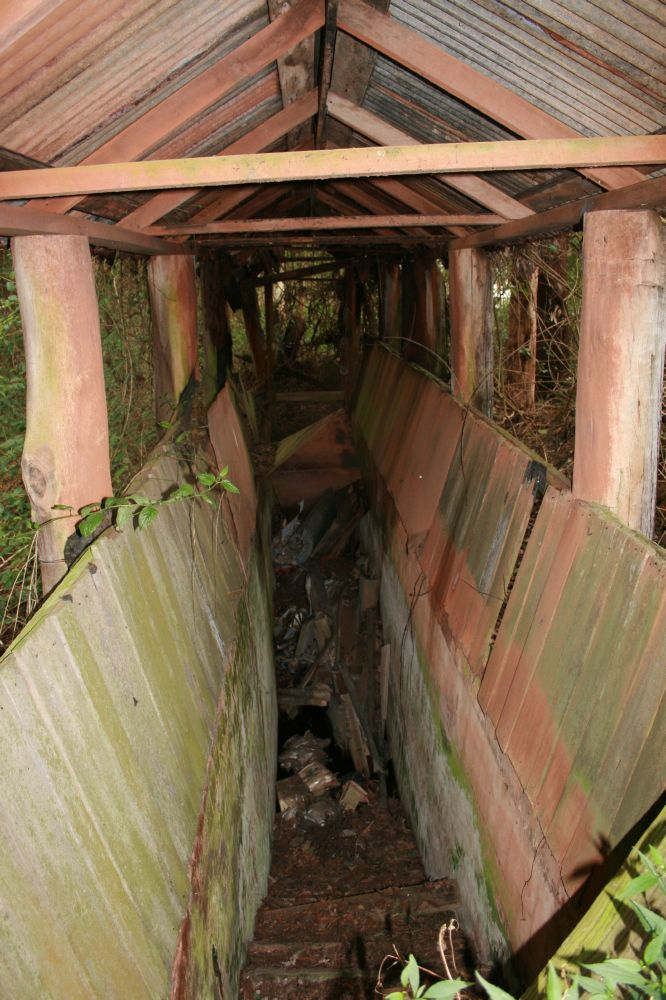
Looking down the plunge of the dip, 2009

Rectangular in plan, the narrow concrete formed cavity runs east/west with the stepped exit ramp at the west end. The long sides of the dip are lined with vertical, half-height timber boards fixed to sawn timber rails. The dip is sheltered by a gable roof supported by round timber posts, framed with sawn timber and clad with corrugated iron sheeting.

Timber posts standing adjacent to the dip remain from the holding yards.

The site is bounded by a low barbed wire and timber fence.

== Heritage listing ==
Peachester Public Dip was listed on the Queensland Heritage Register on 3 April 2009 having satisfied the following criteria.

The place is important in demonstrating the evolution or pattern of Queensland's history.

Peachester Public Dip (built 1915) is important in demonstrating the evolution of the Queensland government's response to the threat to its cattle-based industries that the spread of tick fever caused from the 1890s by providing public dips on reserved land.

Peachester Public Dip was an important component in the management of dairy cattle within the North Coast region, one of the major dairy production areas in Queensland.

The place demonstrates rare, uncommon or endangered aspects of Queensland's cultural heritage.

Peachester Public Dip is important as rare surviving evidence of the practice of plunge dipping cattle at locally developed, small public dips that was common in the first few decades of the 20th century. This practice has been largely superseded by large public dips at the borders of tick-free areas and technological innovations in the treatment of cattle tick infestation.

The place is important in demonstrating the principal characteristics of a particular class of cultural places.

Peachester Public Dip demonstrates the principal characteristics of a plunge cattle dip used to combat cattle tick in the early part of the 20th century. These characteristics include the rectilinear dip formed in concrete with a stepped concrete ramp up from the dip; a timber-framed, gabled roof clad in corrugated iron sheeting and posts of the associated holding yards.
