= Bald Knob, Queensland =

Bald Knob
- Suburb
- Interactive map of Bald Knob
- Coordinates: 26.7825°S 152.9083°E
- Country: Australia
- State: Queensland
- LGA: Sunshine Coast Region
- Location: 7.3 km (4.5 mi) ESE of Maleny; 26.2 km (16.3 mi) W of Caloundra; 29.8 km (18.5 mi) S of Nambour; 93.9 km (58.3 mi) N of Brisbane

Government
  - State electorate: Glass House
  - Federal division: Fisher

Area
  - Total: 20.1 km^{2} (7.8 sq mi)

Population
  - Total: 280 (2021 census)
  - Density: 13.93/km^{2} (36.1/sq mi)
- Time zone: UTC+10:00 (AEST)
- Postcode: 4552
Suburbs around Bald Knob
Balmoral Ridge	Diamond Valley	Mooloolah Valley
Maleny; Crohamhurst	Bald Knob	Landsborough
Crohamhurst	Peachester	Mount Mellum

Bald Knob is a rural locality in the Sunshine Coast Region, Queensland, Australia. In the 2021 census, Bald Knob had a population of 280 people.

== Geography ==
Bald Knob is 78 kilometres (48 mi) north of Brisbane on the Blackall Range in the Sunshine Coast hinterland of South East Queensland.

Bald Knob has the following mountains:

- Bald Knob (26.7900°S 152.9184°E) 462 metres (1,516 ft) above sea level
- Wilkes Knob (26.7789°S 152.9154°E) 477 metres (1,565 ft) above sea level

Landsborough–Maleny Road passes through from south-east to west.

== History ==
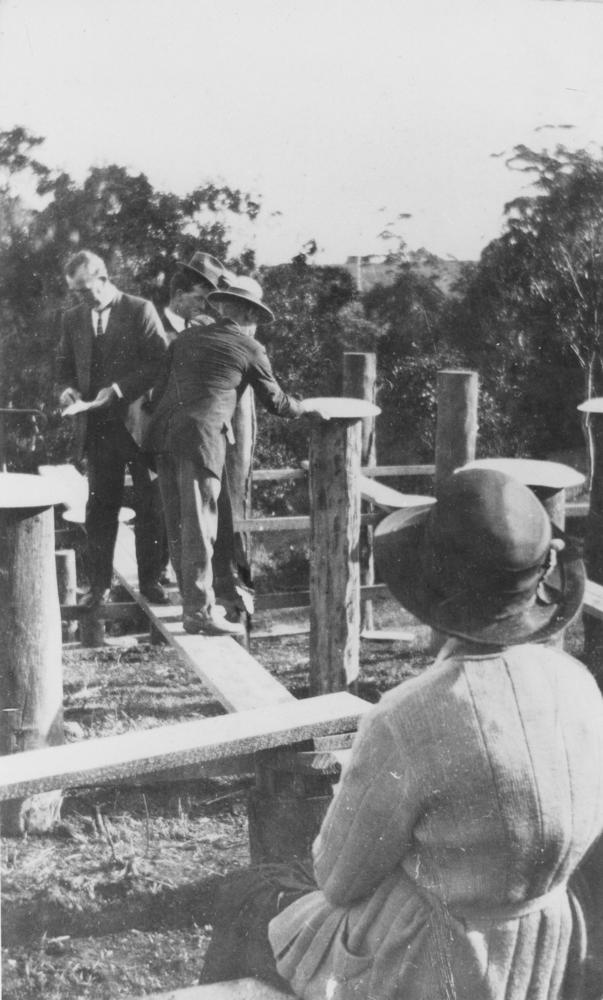
Stump capping ceremony during the construction of the Bald Knob Public Hall, 1924

The locality takes its name from the mountain feature Bald Knob, which was named by selector Samuel Burgess circa 1895, because the lightly forested "bald" feature stood out from the surrounding vine forest.

Bald Knob Provisional School opened on 20 January 1902. On 1 January 1909 it became Bald Knob State School. It closed in August 1945.

On Saturday 26 July 1924, a stump capping ceremony was held to celebrate the commencement of construction of the Bald Knob public hall. The hall was officially opened on 18 October 1924 by Richard Warren, the Member of the Queensland Legislative Assembly for Murrumba.

== Demographics ==
In the 2011 census, Bald Knob had a population of 254 people, 49.6% female and 50.4% male. The median age of the Bald Knob population was 51 years, 14 years above the national median of 37. 77% of people living in Bald Knob were born in Australia. The other top responses for country of birth were England 6.7%, Portugal 1.6%, El Salvador 1.2%, Germany 1.2%, Canada 1.2%. 95.3% of people spoke only English at home; the next most common languages were 1.2% German, 1.2% Italian, 1.2% Spanish.

In the 2016 census, Bald Knob had a population of 253 people.

In the 2021 census, Bald Knob had a population of 280 people.

== Education ==
There are no schools in Bald Knob. The nearest government primary schools are:

- Mooloolah State School in neighbouring Mooloolah Valley to the north-east
- Landsborough State School in neighbouring Landsborough to the east
- Peachester State School in neighbouring Peachester to the south
- Maleny State School in neighbouring Maleny to the west

The nearest government secondary schools are Maleny State High School in Maleny and Beerwah State High School in Beerwah to the south-east.

== Amenities ==
There are a number of parks in the area:

- Bald Knob Lookout (26.7857°S 152.9202°E)
- Landsborough-Maleny Road Park (26.7913°S 152.9229°E)
- MacDonalds Road Environmental Reserve (26.8049°S 152.9098°E)
- Upper Mooloolah Nature Refuge (26.7660°S 152.8972°E)

== Attractions ==
Skipper Musk Teahouse Lookout is on the Landsborough Maleny Road (26.7855°S 152.9205°E) about halfway between the mountain peaks of Bald Knob and Wilkes Knob. The name originates from a teahouse operated by Amelia Elizabeth Skipper (née Brown) and Daisy Georgina Musk (née Docwra) during the 1920s.

== See also ==
Blackall Range road network
