= Booroobin =

Booroobin Queensland
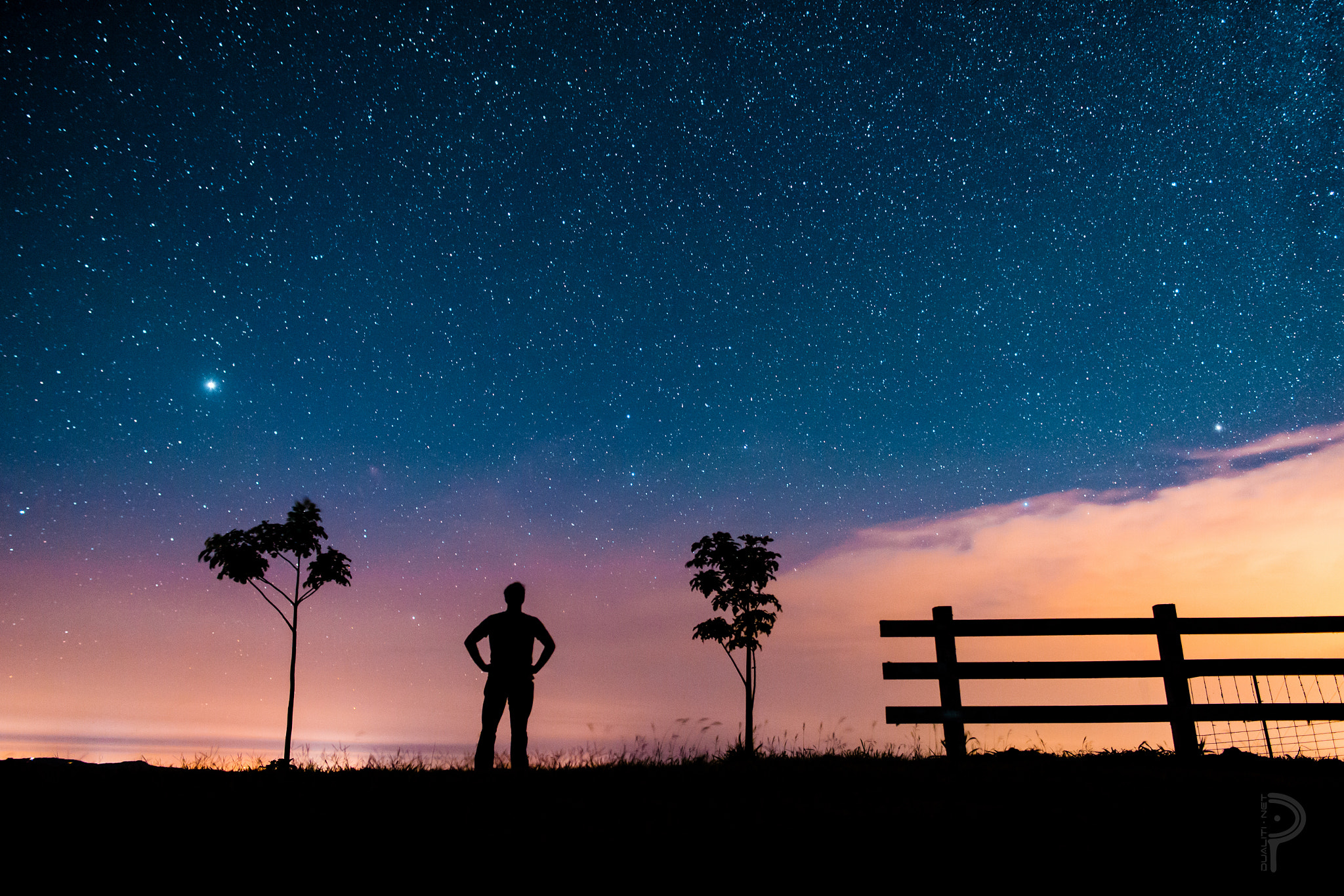
- Booroobin

- Coordinates: 26.8219°S 152.7758°E
- Population: 258 (2021 census)
  - Density: 7.842/km^{2} (20.31/sq mi)
- Postcode(s): 4552
- Area: 32.9 km^{2} (12.7 sq mi)
- Time zone: AEST (UTC+10:00)
- Location: 11.6 km (7 mi) SW of Maleny; 42.7 km (27 mi) W of Caloundra CBD; 50.8 km (32 mi) NNW of Caboolture; 96.6 km (60 mi) N of Brisbane CBD
- LGA(s): City of Moreton Bay; Sunshine Coast Region
- State electorate(s): Glass House; Buderim
- Federal division(s): Fisher; Blair
Suburbs around Booroobin:
Conondale	Wootha	Peachester
Conondale; Bellthorpe	Booroobin	Peachester
Bellthorpe	Cedarton	Commissioners Flat

Booroobin is a rural locality split between the City of Moreton Bay and the Sunshine Coast Region in Queensland, Australia. In the 2021 census, Booroobin had a population of 258 people.

== Geography ==
Booroobin is the source of the Stanley River and the Mary River. A section of Bellthorpe National Park is in the south east of the locality.

== History ==
The origin of the name Booroobin may be from the Kabi word booroothabbin, meaning "forest oak tree", or another Indigenous word meaning "scrub possum".

Booroobin State School opened on 8 October 1919 and closed in August 1953.

The Booroobin Sudbury School opened in 1996 and closed on 4 December 2003.

== Demographics ==
In the 2011 census, Booroobin recorded a population of 292, 44.2% female and 55.8% male. The median age was 45 years, 8 years above the national median of 37. 73.9% of people living in Booroobin were born in Australia. The other top responses for country of birth were England 6.1%, New Zealand 3.7%, Finland 1.4%, Lebanon 1%, Hungary 1%. 90.8% of people spoke only English at home; the next most common languages were Hungarian (1.4%), 1% Croatian (1%) and Italian (1%).

In the 2016 census, Booroobin had a population of 260 people.

In the 2021 census, Booroobin had a population of 258 people.

== Education ==
There are no schools in Booroobin. The nearest government primary schools are Maleny State School in Maleny to the north-east, Peachester State School in neighbouring Peachester to the east, and Conondale State School in neighbouring Conondale to the north-west. The nearest government secondary school is Maleny State High School in Maleny.

== Amenities ==
Policeman Spur Environmental Reserve is a nature reserve established to protect koalas (26.8002°S 152.7817°E).
