= Mount Mellum, Queensland =

Mount Mellum
- Suburb
- Interactive map of Mount Mellum
- Coordinates: 26.8144°S 152.9336°E
- Country: Australia
- State: Queensland
- LGA: Sunshine Coast Region
- Location: 7.0 km (4.3 mi) W of Landsborough; 10.3 km (6.4 mi) NW of Beerwah; 24.8 km (15.4 mi) W of Caloundra; 86.1 km (53.5 mi) N of Brisbane

Government
  - State electorate: Glass House
  - Federal division: Fisher

Area
  - Total: 10.1 km^{2} (3.9 sq mi)

Population
  - Total: 457 (2021 census)
  - Density: 45.25/km^{2} (117.2/sq mi)
- Time zone: UTC+10:00 (AEST)
- Postcode: 4550
Suburbs around Mount Mellum
Bald Knob	Landsborough	Landsborough
Peachester	Mount Mellum	Landsborough
Beerwah	Beerwah	Beerwah

Mount Mellum is a rural locality in the Sunshine Coast Region, Queensland, Australia. In the 2021 census, Mount Mellum had a population of 457 people.

== Geography ==
Mount Mellum (26.8216°S 152.9234°E) rises to 406 metres (1,332 ft) above sea level in the south-east of the locality.

== History ==
Prior to occupation by European colonists in the 19th century, Mount Mellum, along with the rest of the modern Sunshine Coast Region was under the custodianship of the Gubbi Gubbi aboriginal nation.

Mount Mellum State School opened in 1920 and closed in 1926. It reopened in 1930 and then closed permanently circa 1938.

== Demographics ==
In the 2016 census, Mount Mellum had a population of 442 people.

In the 2021 census, Mount Mellum had a population of 457 people.

== Education ==
There are no schools in Mount Mellum. The nearest government primary school is Landsborough State School in neighbouring Landsborough to the north-east. The nearest government secondary school is Beerwah State High School in neighbouring Beerwah to the south-east.
