= Commissioners Flat =

Commissioners Flat Queensland
- Coordinates: 26.8733°S 152.8416°E
- Population: 23 (2021 census)
  - Density: 1.81/km^{2} (4.69/sq mi)
- Postcode(s): 4514
- Area: 12.7 km^{2} (4.9 sq mi)
- Time zone: AEST (UTC+10:00)
- Location: 16.3 km (10 mi) W of Beerwah; 38.2 km (24 mi) NNW of Caboolture; 41.5 km (26 mi) WSW of Caloundra; 86.7 km (54 mi) NNW of Brisbane CBD
- LGA(s): City of Moreton Bay
- State electorate(s): Glass House
- Federal division(s): Longman
Suburbs around Commissioners Flat:
Cedarton	Peachester	Peachester
Cedarton	Commissioners Flat	Peachester
Stanmore	Woodford	Glass House Mountains

Commissioners Flat is a rural locality in the City of Moreton Bay, Queensland, Australia. In the 2021 census, Commissioners Flat had a population of 23 people.

== Geography ==
The Stanley River forms the western boundary of the locality.

Burgalba Lagoon is a waterhole (26.8605°S 152.8280°E). The lagoon is significant for the Dallambara, who were a clan of the Jinibara people. It was a place of testing young men and making rain. It was the home of Gairwar the rainbow serpent and a source of magic stones. The name Burgalba means "box tree".

Glass House Mountains Conservation Park and Peachester State Forest (extending into neighbouring Peachester) occupies the eastern half of the locality. Apart from these protected areas, the predominant land use is grazing on native vegetation.

== History ==
It was named after Stephen Simpson, the Queensland commissioner of lands, who used the area as a camp site in the mid-19th century. Although the normal rules of English grammar would suggest that the locality name should be spelled with a possessive apostrophe, the official titles of place names in Queensland do not include that particular punctuation.

Commissioner's Flat State School opened on 22 January 1912. It closed on 1 January 1973. It was on the eastern side of Cove Road (approx 26.8666°S 152.8309°E).

== Demographics ==
In the 2016 census, Commissioners Flat had a population of 28 people.

In the 2021 census, Commissioners Flat had a population of 23 people.

== Education ==
There are no schools in Commissioners Flat. The nearest government primary school is Peachester State School in neighbouring Peachester to the north-east. The nearest government secondary schools are Woodford State School (to Year 10) in Woodford to the south-west and Beerwah State High School (to Year 12) in Beerwah to the east. There are also non-government schools in Beerwah.
