= Henry Conwell Wood =

The Hon Henry Wood

Member of the Queensland Legislative Council
- In office 17 April 1886 – 31 December 1902

Personal details
- Born: Henry Conwell Wood; 1840 Bellary, India
- Died: 18 June 1926 (aged 86) Brisbane, Queensland, Australia
- Resting place: Woodford Cemetery
- Spouse: Margaret Ann Mason (m.1888 d.1937)
- Occupation: Cattle breeder

Henry Conwell Wood (July 1840 – 18 June 1926) was a Member of the Queensland Legislative Council.

== Early life ==
Wood was born in Bellary, India, to Herbert Wood and his wife, Maria-Louisa (née Conwell) and was educated at Cheltenham College.

== Pastoral life ==
Wood arrived in Queensland around 1861 and entered into partnership with John McConnel to take up Durundur Station, near Woodford. Wood imported the first Hereford cattle, which to be a successful breed in Queensland.

== Public life ==
Wood was appointed to the Queensland Legislative Council in April 1886 and resigned in December 1902. He had strong political views, and made his presence felt in the chamber.

He was Secretary of the Queensland National Association and a member of the Caboolture Divisional Board.

== Personal life ==
In June 1888 Wood married Margaret Ann Mason in Brisbane.

Wood died on 18 June 1926 aged 86 years, He was buried in Woodford Cemetery.

== Legacy ==
The town of Woodford was named in his honour.
