= Stony Creek, Queensland =

Stony Creek Queensland
- Coordinates: 26.9191°S 152.7119°E
- Population: 245 (2021 census)
  - Density: 5.408/km^{2} (14.01/sq mi)
- Postcode(s): 4514
- Area: 45.3 km^{2} (17.5 sq mi)
- Time zone: AEST (UTC+10:00)
- Location: 8.5 km (5 mi) NW of Woodford; 16.4 km (10 mi) E of Kilcoy; 33.8 km (21 mi) NW of Caboolture; 82.0 km (51 mi) NNW of Brisbane CBD
- LGA(s): City of Moreton Bay
- State electorate(s): Pumicestone
- Federal division(s): Longman
Suburbs around Stony Creek:
Sandy Creek	Bellthorpe	Bellthorpe
Royston	Stony Creek	Woodford
Royston	Neurum	Woodford

Stony Creek (formerly Stoney Creek) is a rural locality in the City of Moreton Bay in Queensland, Australia. In the 2021 census, Stony Creek had a population of 245 people.

== Geography ==
The locality is 68 kilometres (42 mi) north of Brisbane.

The locality is bounded to the south by the Stanley River and to the south-west by Mary Smokes Creek.

Mount Mclean is in the north-west of the locality (26.8832°S 152.7412°E) and rises to 464 metres (1,522 ft) above sea level.

Stony Creek is a watercourse that rises in Bellthorpe to the north-west and flows roughly south through the locality of Stone Creek where it becomes a tributary of the Stanley River at 26.9447°S 152.7230°E on the boundary with Neurum to the south.

The D'Aguilar Highway enters the locality from the east (Woodford) and exits to the west (Royston).

Most of the residential land use is along the D'Aguilar Highway and Stony Creek Road. There are small areas of forestry and cropping, but the predominant land use in the locality is grazing on native vegetation.

== History ==
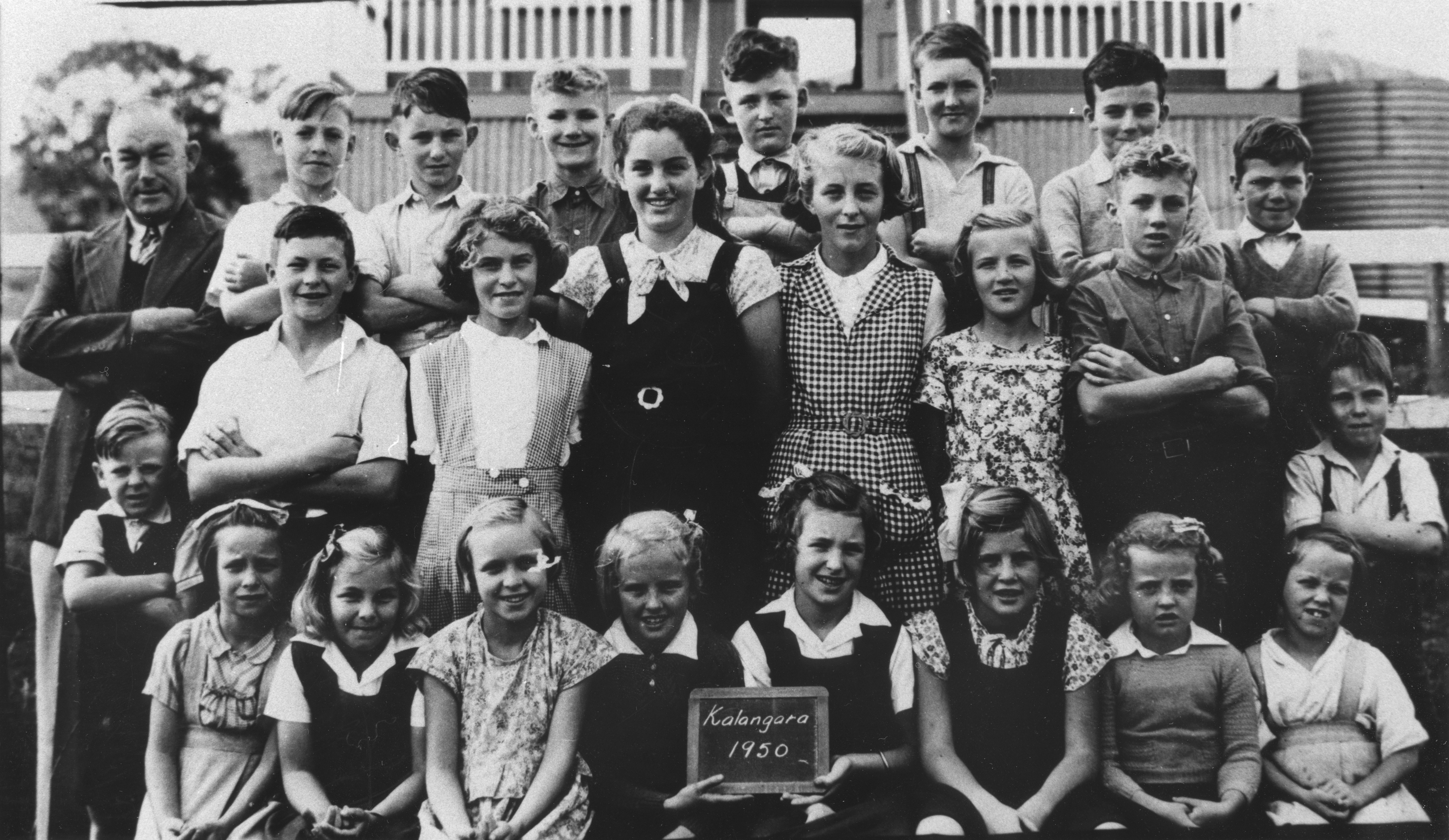
Pupils of the Kalangara State School, 1950

Stony Creek Provisional School opened circa 1877. On 1 January 1909, it became Stony Creek State School. Due to low student numbers, it closed in 1914.

The Durundur Provisional School opened on 5 July 1897. In 1909 it became Durundur State School. It was renamed Kalangara State School in 1920. The school closed on 25 August 1963. The school was on Stony Creek Road (26.9200°S 152.7217°E). There was a hall adjacent to the school (26.9207°S 152.7220°E).

== Demographics ==
In the 2011 census, Stony Creek recorded a population of 319 people, 44.8% female and 55.2% male. The median age of the Stony Creek population was 45 years, 8 years above the national median of 37. 82.8% of people living in Stony Creek were born in Australia. The other top responses for country of birth were New Zealand 3.4%, England 3.1%, Vanuatu 1.2%, Scotland 0.9%, Italy 0.9%. 90.7% of people spoke only English at home; the next most common languages were 0.9% Pacific Austronesian Languages, nec, 0.9% French, 0.9%.

In the 2016 census, Stony Creek had a population of 262 people.

In the 2021 census, Stony Creek had a population of 245 people.

== Education ==
There are no schools in Stony Creek. The nearest government primary schools are Woodford State School in neighbouring Woodford to the south-east and Mount Kilcoy State School in Mount Kilcoy to the north-west. The nearest government secondary schools are Woodford State School (to Year 10) and Kilcoy State High School in Kilcoy to the south-west.

== Notable people ==
- Denver Beanland attended the Kalangara State School
