= Glass House Mountains, Queensland =

Glass House Mountains
- Town
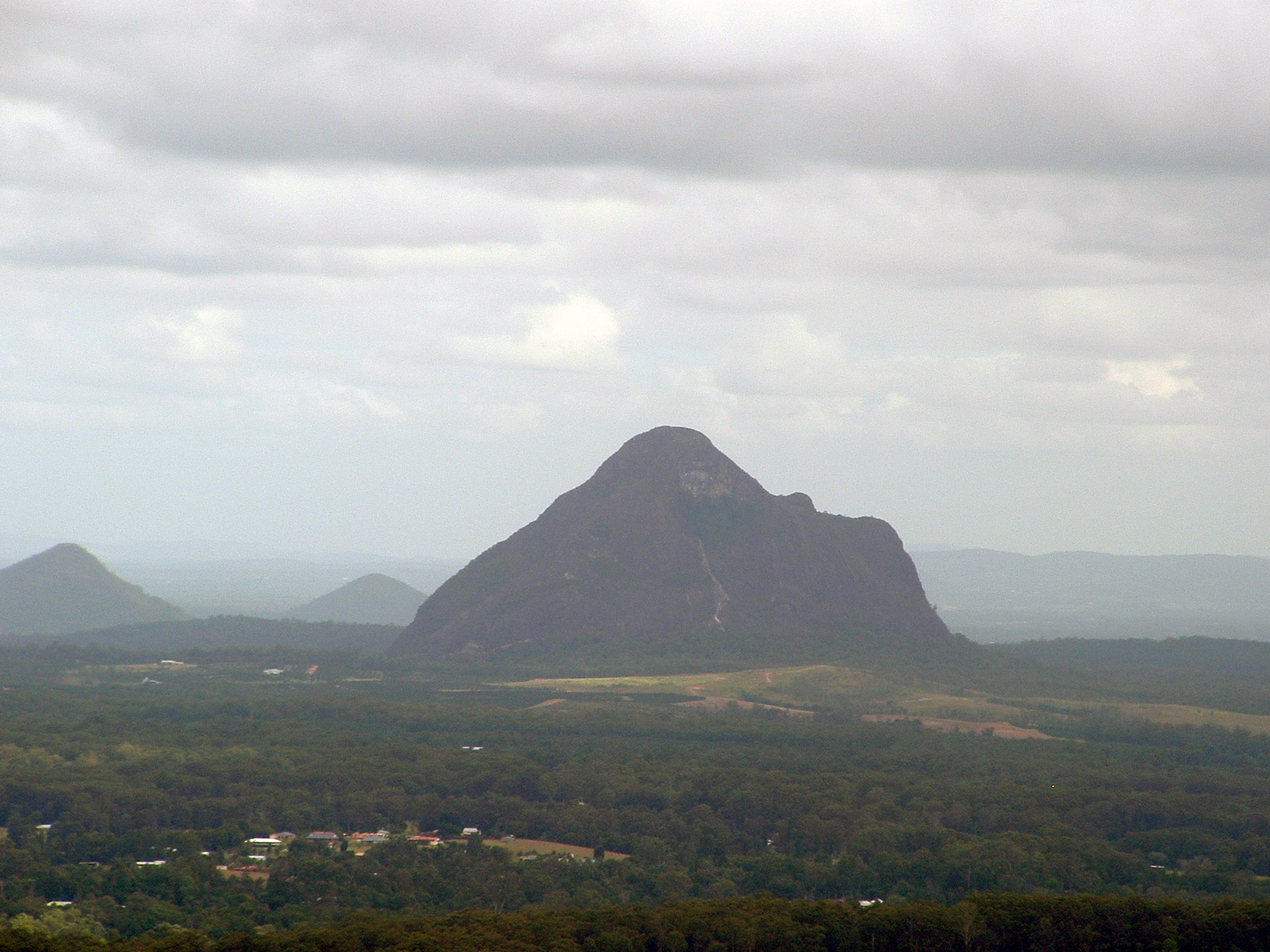
- Mount Beerwah, 2005

- Interactive map of Glass House Mountains
- Coordinates: 26.8975°S 152.9513°E
- Country: Australia
- State: Queensland
- City: Sunshine Coast
- LGA: Sunshine Coast Region
- Location: 30.0 km (18.6 mi) SW of Caloundra; 41.3 km (25.7 mi) SSW of Maroochydore; 41.3 km (25.7 mi) S of Nambour; 71.3 km (44.3 mi) N of Brisbane

Government
  - State electorate: Glass House
  - Federal division: Fisher

Area
  - Total: 73.1 km^{2} (28.2 sq mi)

Population
  - Total: 5,601 (2021 census)
  - Density: 76.62/km^{2} (198.45/sq mi)
- Time zone: UTC+10:00 (AEST)
- Postcode: 4518
- County: Canning
- Parish: Beerwah, Queensland
Localities around Glass House Mountains
| Commissioners Flat; Peachester | Beerwah | Coochin Creek |
| Woodford | Glass House Mountains | Coochin Creek |
| Woodford | Beerburrum | Beerburrum |

Glass House Mountains is a rural hinterland town and locality in the Sunshine Coast Region, Queensland, Australia. In the 2021 census, the locality of Glass House Mountains had a population of 5,601 people.

== Geography ==
The town also has a train station and a railway line that runs northwards towards Northern Queensland and southwards to Brisbane. The Bruce Highway runs along the locality's eastern border. Steve Irwin Way passes through from south to north.

== History ==
Advertising land sale in Glass House Mountains under the title "Pineapple Farms Beerwah", 1903

Land around the Glass House Mountains railway station was auctioned by the Queensland Government on Wednesday 28 October 1903. Most of the lots were about 5 acres (2.0 ha) intended for pineapple farms. The land was in the vicinity of the present-day town centre with Saraha Road, Buzaki Road, and Coonowrin Road shown (but unnamed) on the map provided. The district was referred to as Beerwah as it was within the parish of Beerwah (and not the present-day town of that same name).

Glass Mountains Provisional School opened on 17 April 1906, but closed in 1907 due to low student numbers. It reopened as Glass Mountains State School on 31 October 1910. It was renamed Glass House Mountains State School in 1917, but returned to the name Glass Mountains State School in 1923. In 1935, it was renamed Glass House Mountains State School.

All Saints' Anglican church was dedicated on 19 February 1939 by Archbishop William Wand. It closed circa 1993. The church building was sold for removal.

Glasshouse Country Uniting Church opened its church at Beerwah on 16 December 2000. It was a result of the merger of the Glasshouse Uniting Church, Beerwah Uniting Church, Landsborough Uniting Church and Mooloolah Uniting Church.

In August 2011, the remains of 13 year old Daniel Morcombe were found at Kings Road in Glass House Mountains. Morcombe had been missing, presumed murdered, since 2003 and his disappearance sparked a massive police investigation including a $1M reward.

== Demographics ==
In the 2016 census, the locality of Glass House Mountains had a population of 5,065 people.

In the 2021 census, the locality of Glass House Mountains had a population of 5,601 people.

== Heritage listings ==
Glass House Mountains has a number of heritage-listed sites, including:

- 1998 Old Gympie Road: Bankfoot House
- Barrs Road: Glass House Mountains National Park and Beerburrum Forest Reserve

== Education ==
Glass House Mountains State School is a government primary (Prep-6) school for boys and girls at 58 Coonowrin Road (26.9055°S 152.9494°E). In 2017, the school had an enrolment of 398 students with 26 teachers (23 full-time equivalent) and 20 non-teaching staff (12 full-time equivalent). In 2018, the school had an enrolment of 391 students with 28 teachers (23 full-time equivalent) and 17 non-teaching staff (11 full-time equivalent).

There is no secondary school in Glass House Mountains. The nearest government secondary school is Beerwah State High School in neighbouring Beerwah to the north.

== Amenities ==
Glass House Mountains Community Hall is at 8 Coonowrin Road (26.9000°S 152.9553°E).

The Sunshine Coast Regional Council operates a mobile library service which visits the Community Hall.

Cornerstone Church meets at the Community Hall. It is part of the Wesleyan Methodist Church of Australia.

The original European farmers that settled in the area brought soccer with them, and it has remained a popular local sport. The soccer grounds were built mostly using resources donated by farmers.

== In popular culture ==
The area was also used as a filming location for the Australian movie Sinbad and the Minotaur, with Mount Coonowrin (Crookneck), Mount Beerwah, Mount Tibrogargan and Mount Ngungun being shown predominantly throughout the movie.
