= Conondale Range =

Mountain range in Queensland, Australia

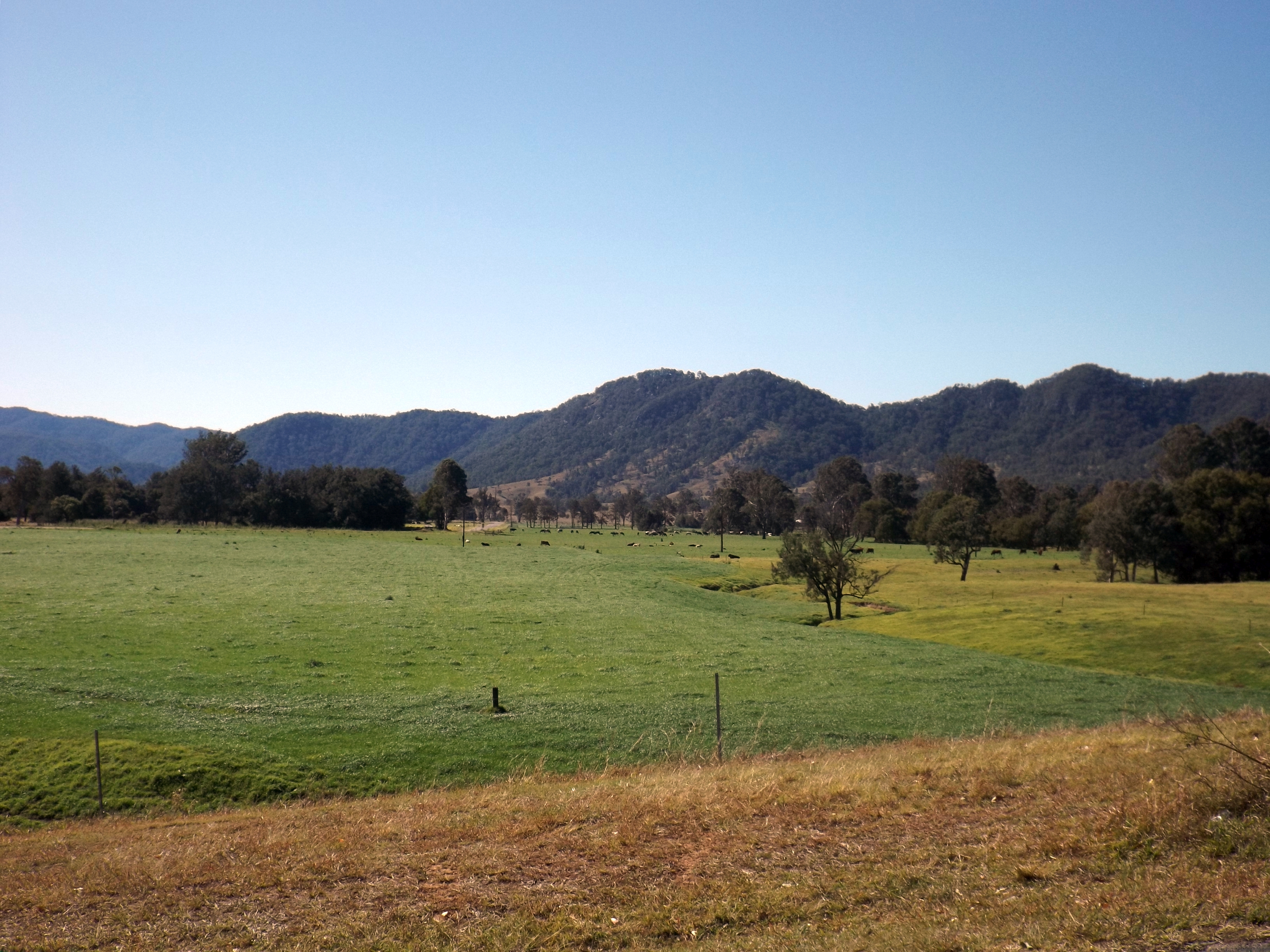
- Southern foothills in Mount Kilcoy, 2015

Highest point
- Peak: Mount Langley (Queensland)
- Elevation: 868 m (2,848 ft)
- Coordinates: 26°50′S 152°45′E

Geography
- Location within Queensland
- Country: Australia
- State: Queensland
- Region: South East Queensland
- Range coordinates: 26°50′S 152°45′E
- Parent range: Great Dividing Range

The Conondale Range is a mountain range in Queensland, located between Maleny, Kenilworth, Kilcoy and Jimna. The range is the most westerly part of the Sunshine Coast hinterland and part of the Great Dividing Range. The highest point on the range is Mount Langley reaching 868 m above sea level. This is also the highest point in the Brisbane River catchment.

Lower foothills of the range around Kilcoy are used for grazing. Most of the steep forested slopes of the range are state forests and Conondale National Park. In the south, parts of Stony Creek are preserved in Bellthorpe National Park.

The mountains are the source of the Brisbane River. Creeks on the south of the range drain into the Stanley River and directly into Lake Somerset. To the north creeks flow into the Mary River.

== History ==
Dalla (also known as Dalambara and Dallambara) is a language of the Upper Brisbane River catchment, notably the Conondale Range. Dalla is part of the Duungidjawu language region includes the landscape within the local government boundaries of the Somerset and Moreton Bay Regional Councils, particularly the towns of Caboolture, Kilcoy, Woodford and Moore.

== Fauna ==
Some 1620 km^{2} of the Conondale Range is classified by BirdLife International as an Important Bird Area because it supports an isolated, and the northernmost, population of the endangered eastern bristlebird, which was only discovered in the 1980s. It is also home large populations of the black-breasted button-quail, pale-yellow robin, paradise riflebird, regent bowerbird, green catbird and Australian logrunner.

The extinct gastric-brooding frog and endangered Fleay's barred frog are two frog species endemic to the Conondale Range and parts of nearby regions.

== See also ==
- Blackall Range
- Bunya Mountains
- List of mountains in Australia
