= Peachester, Queensland =

Peachester
- Town
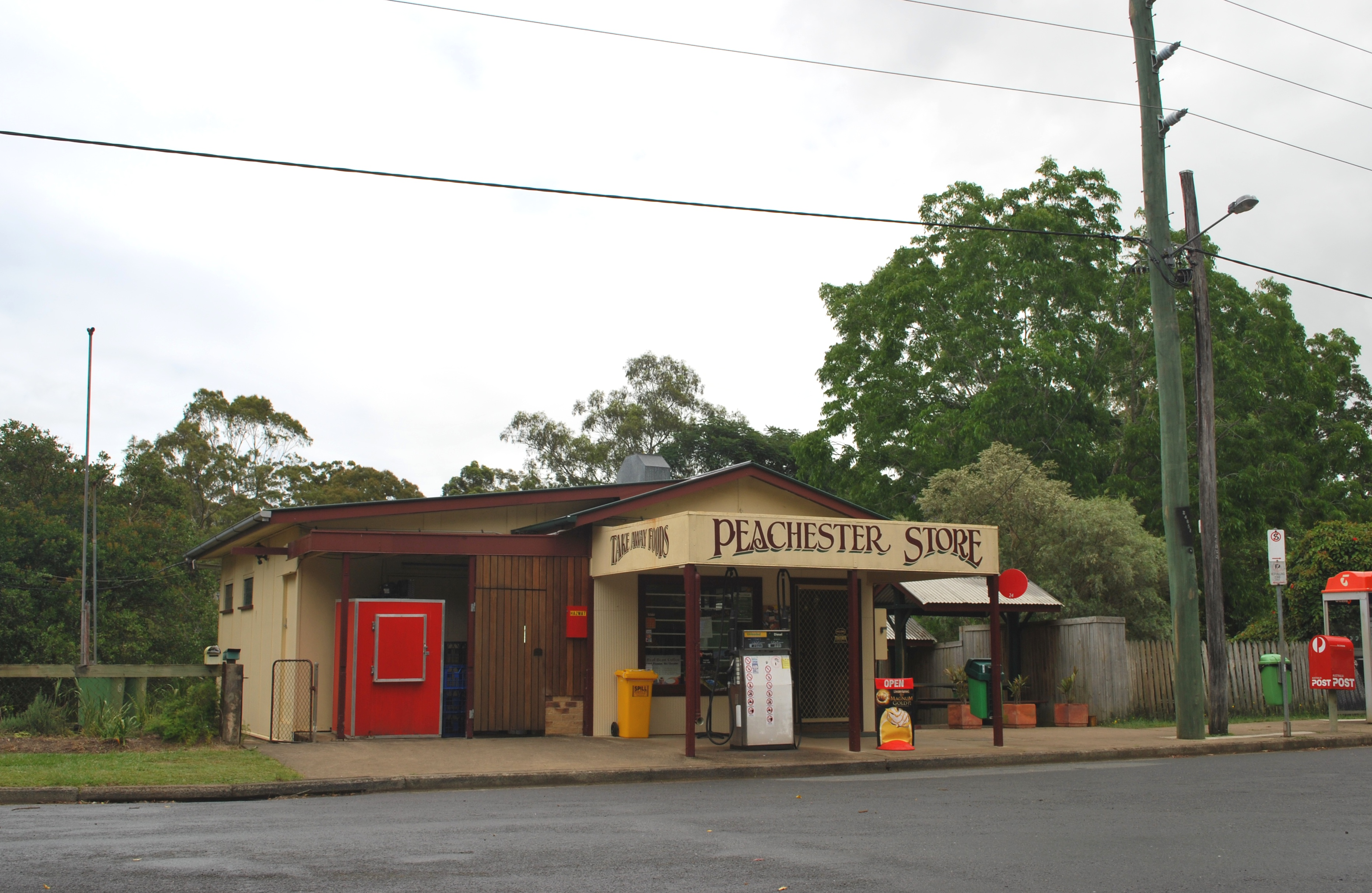
- General store

- Interactive map of Peachester
- Coordinates: 26.8430°S 152.8847°E
- Country: Australia
- State: Queensland
- LGA: Sunshine Coast Region
- Location: 9 km (5.6 mi) W of Beerwah; 19.6 km (12.2 mi) S of Maleny; 36.8 km (22.9 mi) WSW of Caloundra; 84.8 km (52.7 mi) N of Brisbane

Government
  - State electorate: Glass House
  - Federal division: Fisher

Area
  - Total: 55.7 km^{2} (21.5 sq mi)

Population
  - Total: 1,460 (2021 census)
  - Density: 26.21/km^{2} (67.89/sq mi)
- Time zone: UTC+10:00 (AEST)
- Postcode: 4519
- County: Canning
- Parish: Durundur
Localities around Peachester
Wootha; Booroobin	Crohamhurst	Bald Knob; Mount Mellum
Cedarton	Peachester	Beerwah
Commissioners Flat	Glass House Mountains	Glass House Mountains

Peachester is a rural town and locality in the Sunshine Coast Region, Queensland, Australia. In the 2021 census, the locality of Peachester had a population of 1,460 people.

== Geography ==
Peachester is in the Sunshine Coast hinterland. The D'Aguliar Range commences in the north-west of the locality. Kilcoy–Beerwah Road runs through from west to east.

== History ==
Peachester was named when the town was surveyed in 1888 by William Embury Hill. The name refers to a peach tree which was growing at the crossing of the Stanley River.

A public hall was built at the town in 1889.

Peachester Provisional School opened on 19 April 1892 in the public hall. Due to low student numbers it closed in 1893 but reopened in 1894. On 2 May 1910 it became Peachester State School.

Early industries included dairying, timber felling for Grigor's sawmill.

On Wednesday 20 June 1906 the Venerable H. F. Le Fanu, Archdeacon of Toowoomba performed a stump capping ceremony for the new Anglican church. St Andrew's Anglican church was dedicated on 1 January 1908 by Archdeacon Le Fanu. The church was destroyed on New Year's Day 1 June 1963 by Tropical Cyclone Annie and was not rebuilt.

Peachester Post Office opened by 1918 (a receiving office had been open from 1895) and closed in 1974.

Peachester Uniting Church (formerly Methodist), 2006

Peachester Methodist Church opened on Sunday 10 December 1922. It was at 956 Peachester Road (26.8442°S 152.8831°E). It was built on land beside the community hall donated by K Hendren. It was erected by volunteers using materials supplied by William Andrew Grigor. In 1977, following the amalgamation of the Methodist Church into the Uniting Church, it became Peachester Uniting Church. In 2017, it became Peachester Community Church.

A fruit case factory for fruit growers operated in the 1920s and post World War II years.

Between the 1930s and 1950s, Peachester was known as the home of Inigo Jones, the long range weather forecaster.

== Demographics ==
In the 2006 census, the town of Peachester had a population of 452 people.

In the 2011 census, the locality of Peachester had a population of 1,259 people.

In the 2016 census, the locality of Peachester had a population of 1,357 people.

In the 2021 census, the locality of Peachester had a population of 1,460 people.

== Education ==
Peachester State School is a government primary (Prep–6) school for boys and girls at 966 Peachester Road (26.8437°S 152.8825°E). In 2018, the school had an enrolment of 85 students with 11 teachers (6 full-time equivalent) and 9 non-teaching staff (4 full-time equivalent).

There are no secondary schools in Peachester. The nearest government secondary schools are Beerwah State High School in neighbouring Beerwah to the east and Maleny State High School in Maleny to the north-west.

== Heritage listings ==
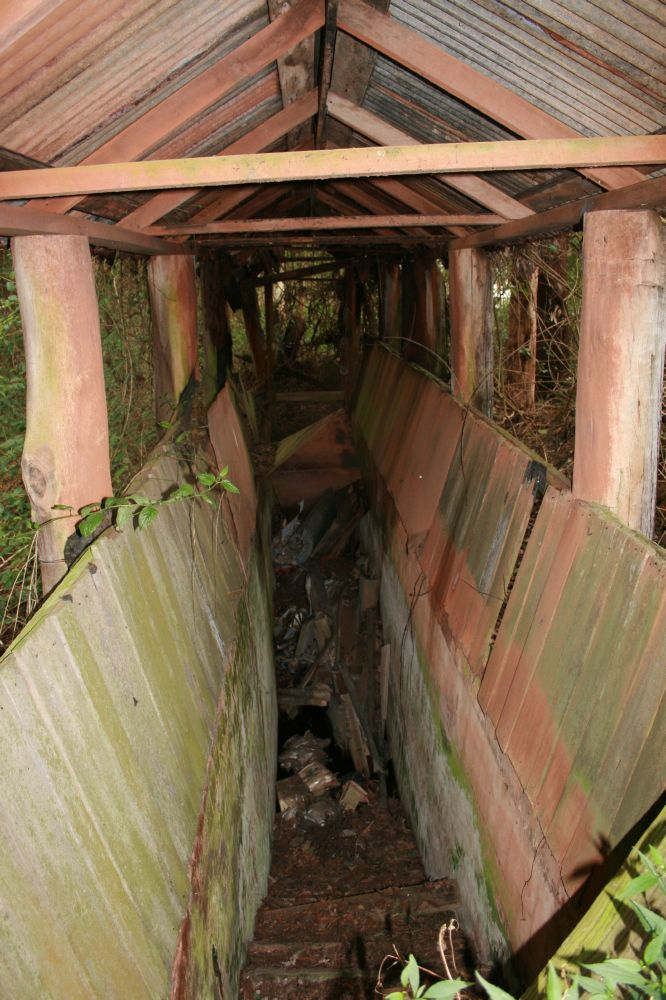
Peachester Public Dip, 2009

Peachester has a number of heritage-listed sites, including:

- Peachester Public Dip, Peachester Road (26.8352°S 152.8695°E)

== Amenities ==
The Sunshine Coast Council operates a mobile library service which visits near the Community Hall.

The Peachester branch of the Queensland Country Women's Association meets at Peachester Hall at 963 Peachester Road.

== Attractions ==
The Peachester Heritage Centre is behind the Peachester Hall. It celebrates the region's timber industry and its famous resident, the weather forcaster, Indigo Jones.

== Facilities ==
Despite the name, Peachester Cemetery is on Cemetery Road in Crohamhurst.

== See also ==
- Blackall Range road network
