= Woodford, Queensland =

Town in Australia

Woodford
- Town
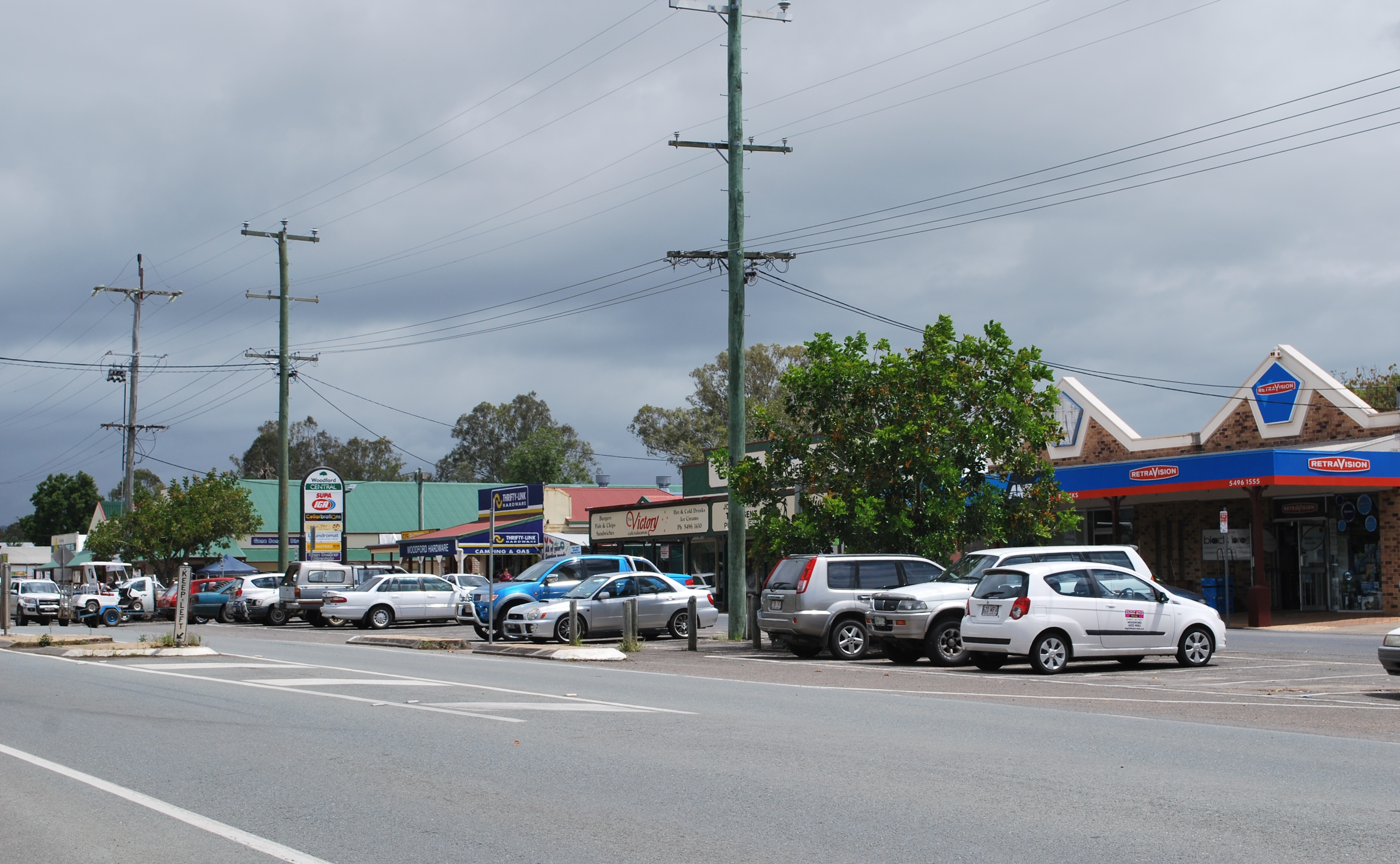
- Main street

- Interactive map of Woodford
- Coordinates: 26.9408°S 152.7669°E
- Country: Australia
- State: Queensland
- LGA: City of Moreton Bay
- Location: 25.3 km (15.7 mi) NW of Caboolture; 73.4 km (45.6 mi) NNW of Brisbane CBD
- Established: 1841

Government
  - State electorate: Glass House
  - Federal division: Longman

Area
  - Total: 90.2 km^{2} (34.8 sq mi)

Population
  - Total: 4,022 (2021 census)
  - Density: 44.590/km^{2} (115.49/sq mi)
- Time zone: UTC+10:00 (AEST)
- Postcode: 4514
- Annual rainfall: 1,324 mm (52.1 in)
Localities around Woodford
Stony Creek; Bellthorpe	Stanmore	Commissioners Flat; Glass House Mountains
Neurum	Woodford	Beerburrum; Elimbah
Delaneys Creek	D'Aguilar	Bracalba; Wamuran

Woodford is a rural town and locality in the City of Moreton Bay, Queensland, Australia. The town is noted for the Woodford Folk Festival that takes place over the New Year holidays. In the 2021 census, the locality of Woodford had a population of 4,022 people.

== Geography ==
Woodford is on the D'Aguilar Highway 73.4 kilometres (45.6 mi) by road north-north-west of Brisbane and 24.3 kilometres (15.1 mi) north-west of Caboolture. Kilcoy–Beerwah Road exits to the north-east.

== History ==
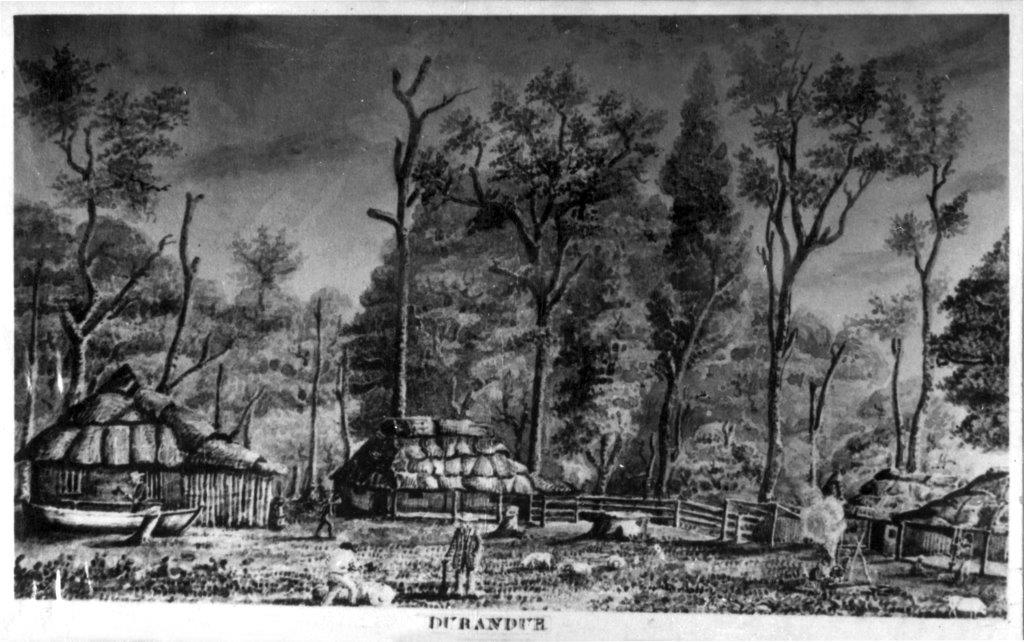
Sketch of Durundur Station by Charles Archer, 1843

Duungidjawu (also known as Kabi Kabi, Cabbee, Carbi, Gabi Gabi) is an Australian Aboriginal language spoken on Duungidjawu country. The Duungidjawu language region includes the landscape within the local government boundaries of Somerset Region and City of Moreton Bay, particularly the towns of Caboolture, Kilcoy, Woodford and Moore.

Dalla (also known as Dalambara and Dallambara) is a language of the Upper Brisbane River catchment, notably the Conondale Range. Dalla is part of the Duungidjawu language region includes the landscape within the local government boundaries of the Somerset and Moreton Bay councils, particularly the towns of Caboolture, Kilcoy, Woodford and Moore.

In 1841 the Archer brothers established Durundur Station along the Stanley River, near where Woodford now stands.

In 1877, 10,800 acres (4,400 ha) were resumed from the Durundur pastoral run and offered for selection on 19 April 1877.

Mr W. Yates was the first to take possession of his selected portion of the country and he built a hotel near a ford across the river. The hotel, and the town which developed around it became known, unofficially, as Yatesville.

The town was positioned on a hill closer to the Stanley River than the present day town. When the introduction of a regular mail service required the town to have an official name a meeting was called and McConnel was decided on in honour of the senior partner of Durundur Station ‑ but the Postmaster General would not accept that name. Therefore, another meeting was called and those present called it Woodford in honour of the junior partner, Henry Conwell Wood, and in recognition of the importance to the community of the ford across the river.

Timber cutting was the town's main industry. Most of the timber sourced from the area was sent to a sawmill in Caboolture.

Durundur Provisional School opened on 23 October 1882. In 1885, it was renamed Woodford Provisional School. It closed on 28 October 1887 to reopen on 14 November 1887 as Woodford State School.

A Catholic chapel was opened circa September–October 1890. On 11 January 1930, a new Catholic church and school were officially opened by Archbishop James Duhig.

St. Matthias' Anglican Church was dedicated on Sunday 28 February 1892 by Bishop William Webber. The site on the northern bank of One Mile Creek and much of the cost of the building the church were donated by Messrs McConnel and Wood of Durundur Station. The architect was John H. Buckeridge. A desire for a more central site resulted in its relocation to its current site using a bullock wagon in 1914. It was re-opened on Tuesday 2 December 1913 by the Anglican Archdeacon of Brisbane.

Dairying was also a major industry. A co-operative dairy factory opened in the town in 1904.

Woodford was a stop on the now-closed Kilcoy railway line. The line reached Woodford in 1909 and connected the town to the small regional centre of Caboolture. There were two railway stations servicing the area: Durundur railway station (26.9530°S 152.7500°E) and Woodford railway station (26.9574°S 152.7817°E). Most of the railway infrastructure was removed after the line closed in the early 1960s with parts of the line dismantled in 1965. Much of the land has been sold.

The Woodford Show Society was established in 1911 and the town's show continues to be held annually.

Woodford Methodist Church was opened on Saturday 6 April 1912 by Reverend Henry Youngman. The church was in a central position of the main street and was 22 by 33 feet (6.7 by 10.1 m). It subsequently became Woodford Uniting Church. It has now closed but the church building is still extant at 126 Archer Street (26.9565°S 152.7780°E).

Woodford Baptist Church opened in 1924.

St Joseph's Catholic School opened on 28 January 1930 and closed in December 1965.

The Woodford public library opened in 1978.

The Maleny Folk Festival relocated from Maleny to Woodford in July 1994, then being renamed the Woodford Folk Festival. The festival commenced in the showgrounds at Maleny in 1987 but its popularity outgrew the site.

Woodford was one of the principal locations for the 2003 low-budget horror film, Undead.

The Festival of the Dreaming, which celebrates Indigenous Australian culture, was first held at Woodford on 10 to 13 June 2005, having started and been held annually in Sydney since 1997. It was held annually until it was incorporated into the Woodford Folk Festival in 2011–2012.

A Woolworths supermarket opened in the town in 2010.

A local landmark up until its closure in 2010 was the Elvis Presley-themed fruit and vegetable shop, Elvis Parsley's Grapelands.

New housing subdivisions were established on Kropp Road and Ironbark Drive during 2010 and 2011.

In 2010 and 2011, the Australian music festival Splendour in the Grass was held in Woodford on the Woodford Folk Festival site.

The town had an online community newspaper from 2010 to approximately 2014.

== Demographics ==
In the 2011 census, the locality of Woodford had a population of 2,517 people, 40.2% female and 59.8% male. The median age of the Woodford population was 37 years, the same as the national median. 82.9% of people living in Woodford were born in Australia. The other top responses for country of birth were New Zealand 4.6%, England 3.4%, Netherlands 0.8%, Scotland 0.7%, Vietnam 0.4%. 74.7% of people spoke only English at home; the next most common languages were 0.7% Dutch, 0.3% German, 0.1% Filipino, 0.1% French, 0.1% Spanish.

In the 2016 census, the locality of Woodford had a population of 3,458 people.

In the 2021 census, the locality of Woodford had a population of 4,022 people.

== Education ==
Woodford State School is a government primary and secondary (Prep–10) school for boys and girls at 171 Archer Street (26.9617°S 152.7806°E). In 2018, the school had an enrolment of 391 students with 42 teachers (33 full-time equivalent) and 30 non-teaching staff (18 full-time equivalent). It includes a special education program.

For secondary education to Year 12, the nearest government secondary schools are Tullawong State High School in Caboolture to the south-east, Beerwah State High School in Beerwah to the north-east, and Kilcoy State High School in Kilcoy to the west.

== Facilities ==
The Woodford Correctional Centre is on the outskirts of town.

== Amenities ==
The Moreton Bay City Council operates a public library in Woodford at 1 Elizabeth Street (26.9545°S 152.7784°E).

Woodford Baptist Church is at 115 Archer Street (26.9550°S 152.7786°E). It has also been known as Stanley River Valley Community Church.

St Matthias' Anglican Church is part of the Kilcoy-Woodford Parish within the Anglican Diocese of Brisbane. It is at 88 Archer Street (26.9535°S 152.7770°E).

St Mary's Catholic Church is at 16 Peterson Road (26.9635°S 152.7824°E). It has a strong ecumenical focus and maintains a close relationship with the Anglican church.

Woodford Kingdom Hall of Jehovah's Witnesses is at 26 Scotts Lane (26.9744°S 152.7859°E).

Woodford is the home of the Stanley River Cricket Club, which supports junior and senior cricket in the local area.

== Events ==
The Woodford Folk Festival is held in the town in December each year.

The Woodford Markets are held on the third Sunday of each month in the middle of the town.

The Woodford Show is held in June each year.

== Attractions ==
The Australian Narrow Gauge Railway Museum Society operates a railway museum at the Woodford railway station. The society was established in January 1971 to preserve the history of narrow-gauge railways in Queensland. The society has collected steam, diesel and petrol locomotives and rollingstock using the 2-foot gauge and has established their Durundur railway at Woodford as an operating heritage line. The society operates a steam train on the first and third Sunday of each month.

The Woodford Historical Society operate a museum at 109 Archer Street as part of the library complex (26.9543°S 152.7784°E).
