= Beerwah, Queensland =

Beerwah
- Town
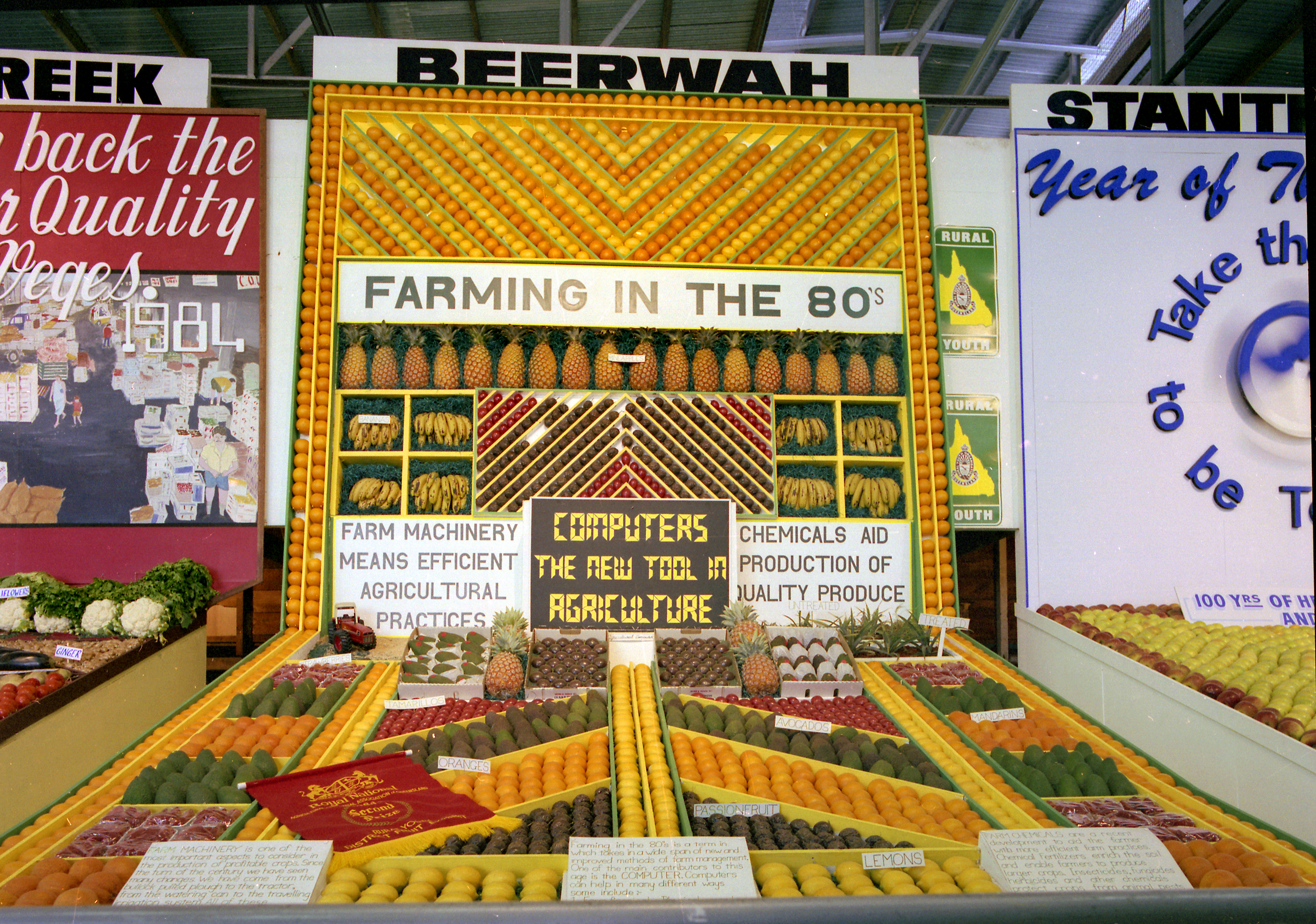
- Beerwah fruit and vegetable display, RNA Exhibition, Brisbane, August 1984

- Interactive map of Beerwah
- Coordinates: 26.8583°S 152.9588°E
- Country: Australia
- State: Queensland
- City: Sunshine Coast
- LGA: Sunshine Coast Region
- Location: 25.9 km (16.1 mi) SW of Caloundra CBD; 72.2 km (44.9 mi) N of Brisbane CBD

Government
  - State electorates: Caloundra; Glass House
  - Federal division: Fisher

Area
  - Total: 58.1 km^{2} (22.4 sq mi)

Population
  - Total: 7,734 (2021 census)
  - Density: 133.12/km^{2} (344.8/sq mi)
- Time zone: UTC+10:00 (AEST)
- Postcode: 4519
- County: Canning
- Parish: Bribie
Localities around Beerwah
Peachester; Mount Mellum	Landsborough	Bells Creek
Peachester	Beerwah	Coochin Creek
Glass House Mountains	Glass House Mountains	Coochin Creek

Beerwah (/ˈbɪərwɑː, -wɔː/) is a rural town and locality in the hinterland of the Sunshine Coast Region, Queensland, Australia. Australia Zoo established by Steve Irwin is a major tourist attraction. At the 2021 census, the locality of Beerwah had a population of 7,734 people.

== Geography ==
Beerwah is situated north of Glass House Mountains, approximately 80 kilometres (50 mi) north of Brisbane, and just south of Landsborough. The main road through Beerwah is called Steve Irwin Way. It was formerly known as the Glasshouse Mountain Tourist Route and is accessed by the Bruce Highway, which bypassed the town in 1985. Kilcoy–Beerwah Road enters from the west.

Beerwah railway station (26.8571°S 152.9584°E) on the Nambour and Gympie North railway line serves the town.

== History ==
The name Beerwah comes from the Kabi language (Turrbal dialect) word birrawaman, with birra meaning sky and wandum meaning climbing up.

Beerwah Post Office opened by August 1907 (a receiving office had been open from 1891).

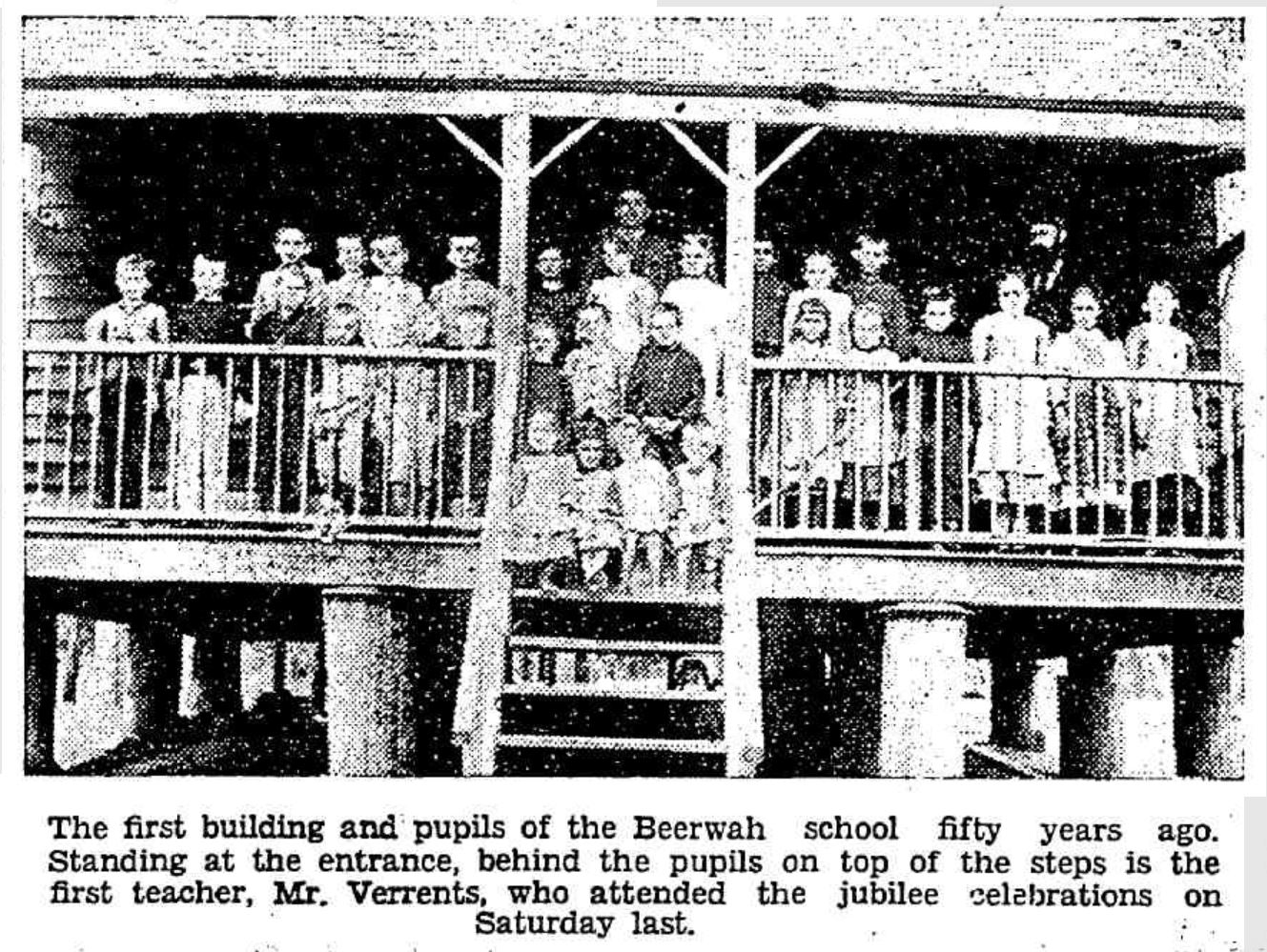
The first building and pupils of the Coochin Creek Provisional School (later Beerwah State School), 1888

The Coochin Creek Provisional School opened on 27 November 1888 with an initial enrolment of 19 students under teacher William Verrants. By the end of 1888, there were 43 students enrolled. It was on the main Peachester road, 1.5 miles (2.4 km) from the Beerwah railway station. On 1 January 1909, it became Coochin Creek State School. In about November 1928, it was renamed Beerwah State School. The school celebrated its golden jubilee in 1938. On 10 July 1952, another Coochin Creek State School opened, but it closed on 11 March 1962.

On Saturday 26 September 1914, the local Anglican residents held a meeting to consider erecting a church in Beerwah. Mr Mawhinney donated a piece of land by the railway station. On Saturday 7 November 1914 Archdeacon Henry Le Fanu officially capped the first stump of the new church building. All the materials for the church and the labour were all donated so the church would be free of debt. On Saturday 6 March 1916, Archdeacon Le Fanu returned to officially open and dedicate St James' Anglican Church. In the 1990s, diminishing numbers in the congregations led to a decision to close a number of churches in the area. St James' was closed and sold for removal.

On 4 July 1991, the Mary MacKillop Catholic Centre was blessed and opened by Archbishop Francis Rush.

Beerwah State High School opened on 1 January 1992.

The Beerwah Library opened in 2000.

Glasshouse Country Christian College was established on 31 January 2000 by the Glasshouse Country Baptist Church with an initial 16 students.

Glasshouse Country Uniting Church opened its church at Beerwah on 16 December 2000, The architects were Thomson Adsett Architects. It was a result of the merger of the Glasshouse Uniting Church, Beerwah Uniting Church, Landsborough Uniting Church and Mooloolah Uniting Church.

Beerwah experienced growth in residential housing 2010.

In October 2009, a small bypass opened south of the town, including an overpass of the railway, a large roundabout at Roberts Road, and traffic signals at Kilcoy-Beerwah Road and Steve Irwin Way. As part of that project, the original level crossing was closed and demolished, causing concern among local residents who claimed the railway sliced the town in two.

== Demographics ==
In the 2016 census, the locality of Beerwah had a population of 6,769 people, 52% female and 48% male. The median age was 39 years, compared to the national median age of 38. Aboriginal and Torres Strait Islander people made up 2.8% of the population. 77.2% of people were born in Australia. The next most common countries of birth were England 5.1% and New Zealand 4.8%. 90.8% of people only spoke English at home. The most common responses for religion in Beerwah were No Religion 32.8%, Anglican 17.2% and Catholic 14.4%.

In the 2021 census, the locality of Beerwah had a population of 7,734 people.

== Heritage listings ==
Beerwah has a number of heritage-listed sites, including:

- Beerwah Hotel, 53 Beerwah Parade
- Site of Coochin Homestead, 2719 Old Gympie Road
- Beerburrum Scientific Area No 1, Roys Road and Mawsons Road (Beerburrum State Forest)
- Beerwah railway station, Simpson Street
- former Beerwah Forest Station and Arboretum, Toys Road, approximately 1 kilometre (0.62 mi) east of Mawsons Road intersection

== Education ==
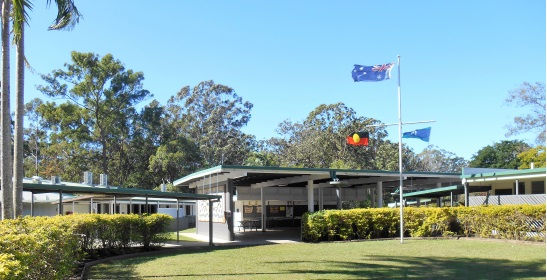
Beerwah State School, 2025

Beerwah State School is a government primary (Early Childhood to Year 6) school for boys and girls at 2788 Old Gympie Road (26.8554°S 152.9399°E). In 2018, the school had an enrolment of 367 students with 40 teachers (32 full-time equivalent) and 21 non-teaching staff (15 full-time equivalent). It includes a special education program.

Glasshouse Christian College is a private primary and secondary (Prep–12) school for boys and girls at 58 Roberts Road (26.8616°S 152.9518°E). In 2018, the school had an enrolment of 1074 students with 75 teachers (70 full-time equivalent) and 67 non-teaching staff (48 full-time equivalent).

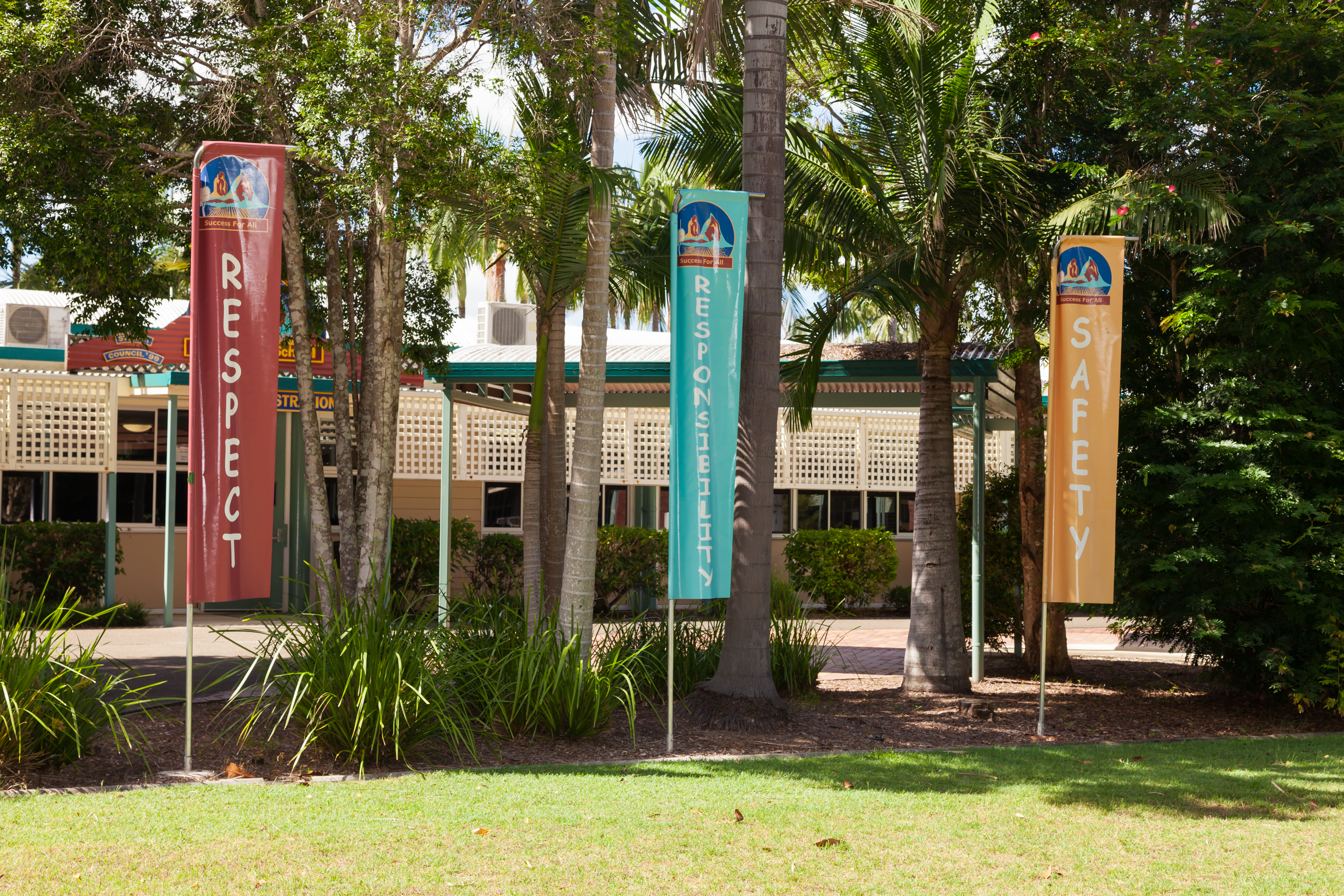
Beerwah State High School, 2025

Beerwah State High School is a government secondary (7–12) school for boys and girls at 35 Roberts Road (26.8627°S 152.9540°E). In 2018, the school had an enrolment of 895 students with 86 teachers (79 full-time equivalent) and 44 non-teaching staff (30 full-time equivalent). It includes a special education program.

== Amenities ==
The Sunshine Coast Regional Council operates a public library at 25 Peachester Road.

The Beerwah branch of the Queensland Country Women's Association meets at 39 Simpson Street.

Anglican church services are held at the Mary MacKillop Catholic Centre at 160 Peachester Road (26.8579°S 152.9427°E).

Glasshouse Country Uniting Church (also known as Beerwah Uniting Church) is at 29 Twin Peaks Drive (26.8718°S 152.9599°E).

There are a number of parks in the locality, including:

- Beerwah Sports Ground, Roberts Rd, Beerwah (26.8641°S 152.9565°E)
- Biondi Crescent Park (26.8589°S 152.9644°E)
- CWA Park (26.8580°S 152.9581°E)
- Cabrera Park (26.8695°S 152.9750°E)
- Caralan Way Park (26.8623°S 152.9454°E)
- Caralan Way/Emma Place Park 2 (26.8622°S 152.9464°E)
- Carnarvon Drive Bushland Park
- Chantilly Park (26.8558°S 152.9485°E)
- Coochin Creek Riparian Zone on Steve Irwin Way (26.8687°S 152.9668°E)
- Coochin Nature Park
- Esplanade (26.8661°S 152.9481°E)
- Emma Place Park (26.8612°S 152.9476°E)
- Foley Road Buffer (26.8530°S 152.9598°E)
- Gowen Park (26.8229°S 152.9544°E)
- Hibiscus Park (26.8591°S 152.9516°E)
- Jubilee Park
- Kello Road Environmental Reserve (26.8682°S 152.9603°E)
- Kindy Park (26.8566°S 152.9604°E)
- Lachlan Crescent Busland Reserve (26.8612°S 152.9170°E)
- Lachlan Crescent North Drainage Reserve (26.8601°S 152.9199°E)
- Lachlan Crescent Park (26.8612°S 152.9164°E)
- Lachlan Crescent South Drainage Reserve (26.8625°S 152.9158°E)
- Lindeman Road Natural Amenity Reserve (26.8702°S 152.9312°E)
- Mill Park (26.8538°S 152.9577°E)
- Monarch Place Natural Amenity Reserve (26.8653°S 152.9521°E)
- Monica Smith Park (26.8584°S 152.9440°E)
- Newell Park (26.8488°S 152.9523°E)
- Newells Rd Buffer (26.8467°S 152.9535°E)
- Newton Park (26.8304°S 152.9616°E)
- Old Peachester Road Natural Amenity Reserve (26.8492°S 152.9071°E)
- Otto Northling Road Natural Amenity Reserve (26.8586°S 152.9251°E)
- Otto Nothling Place Drainage Reserve
- Otto Nothling Place Park
- Park (26.8672°S 152.9497°E)
- Parkside Drive Bushland Park (26.8567°S 152.9521°E)
- Peachester Dr/Parkside Dr Walkway Link (26.8572°S 152.9476°E)
- Pinelands Park (26.8286°S 152.9496°E)
- Reserve (26.8636°S 152.9467°E)
- Roberts Road Park (26.8593°S 152.9473°E)
- Settlement Park (26.8590°S 152.9364°E)
- Shaws Road Drainage Reserve (26.8614°S 152.9219°E)
- Sidney Drive Bushland Reserve (26.8301°S 152.9641°E)
- Sidney Drive Park
- Steve Irwin Way Buffer Kello Road Estate
- Thompson Road Buffer
- Turner Park (26.8592°S 152.9555°E)
- Twin Peaks Park (26.8727°S 152.9592°E)
- Whistler Place Open Space (26.8657°S 152.9518°E)
- Woodgrove Boulevard Drainage Reserve (26.8645°S 152.9512°E)
- Woodgrove Boulevard Park (26.8635°S 152.9510°E)
- Woodgrove Esplanade Walkway 1 (26.8673°S 152.9514°E)
- Woodgrove Esplanade Walkway 2 (26.8660°S 152.9483°E)
- Woodgrove Stage 7 (26.8651°S 152.9477°E)

== Tourism ==
=== Attractions ===
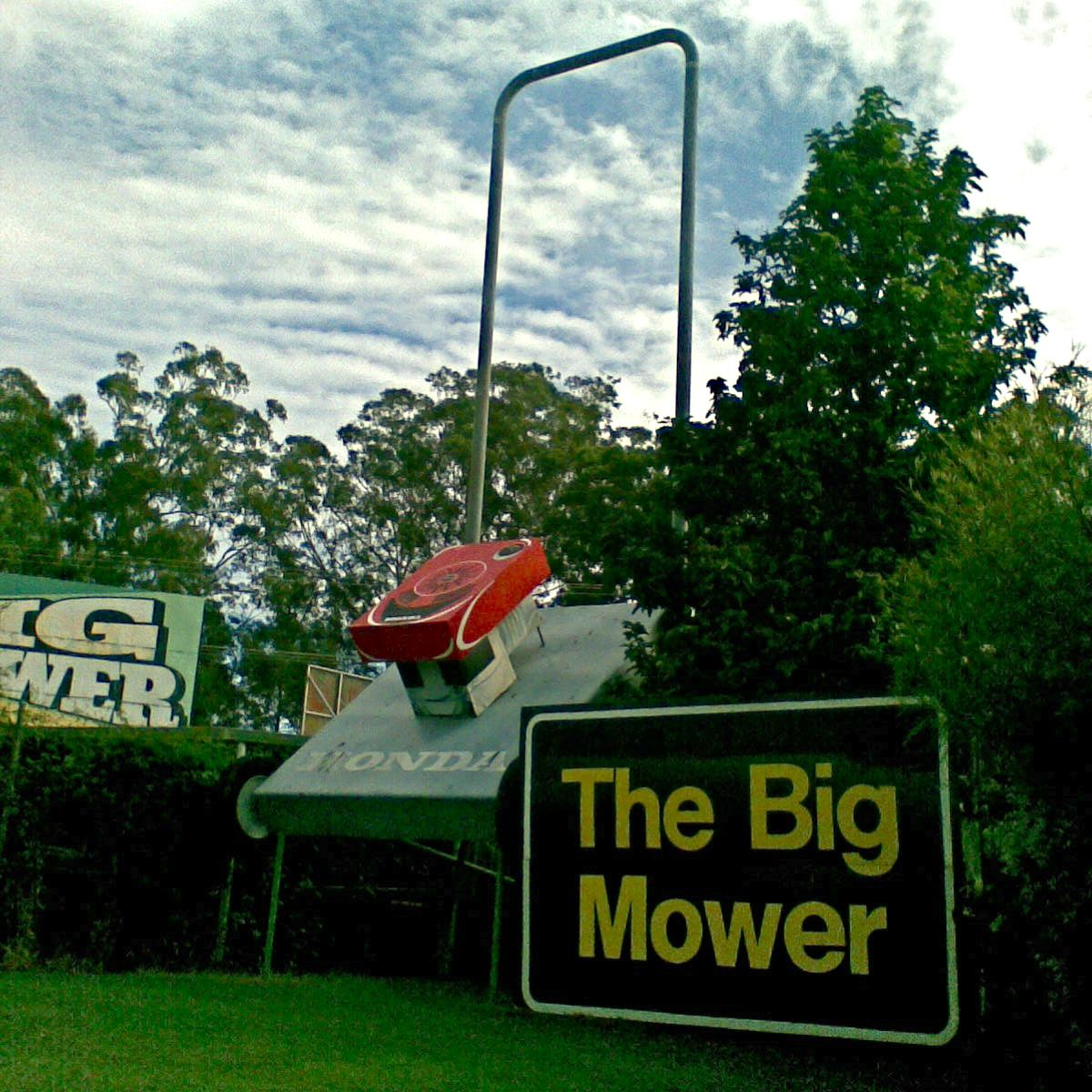
The Big Mower

Australia Zoo is located in Beerwah. The zoo was founded by Bob Irwin and later made famous by his son, Steve Irwin.

Another attraction, the Glass House mountain range, is located nearby. The largest mountain in the range, at 555m, is Mount Beerwah. Access to the Mount Beerwah summit route has been closed since 2008 due to the erosion and destabilization of some walking tracks, leading to a high risk of rock fall.

The Big Mower, one of Australia's big things, is located in Beerwah.

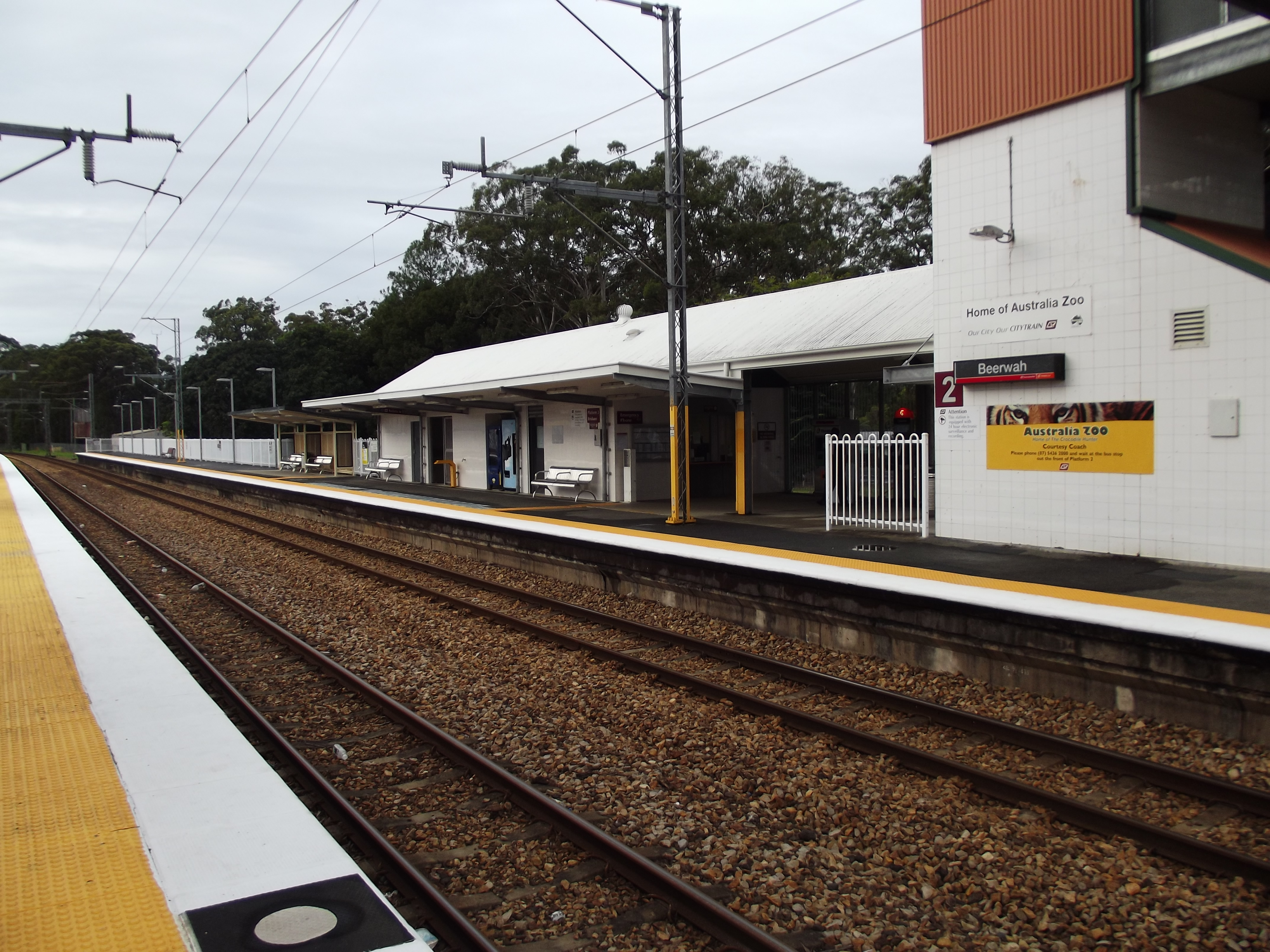
Beerwah Railway Station, Queensland, June 2012

== Notable residents ==
- Lawrence Daws, painter and printmaker
- The Irwin family: Bob Irwin, Steve Irwin, Terri Irwin, Bindi Irwin, Robert Irwin, environmentalists and operators of Australia Zoo
