= Stanley River (Queensland) =

Stanley
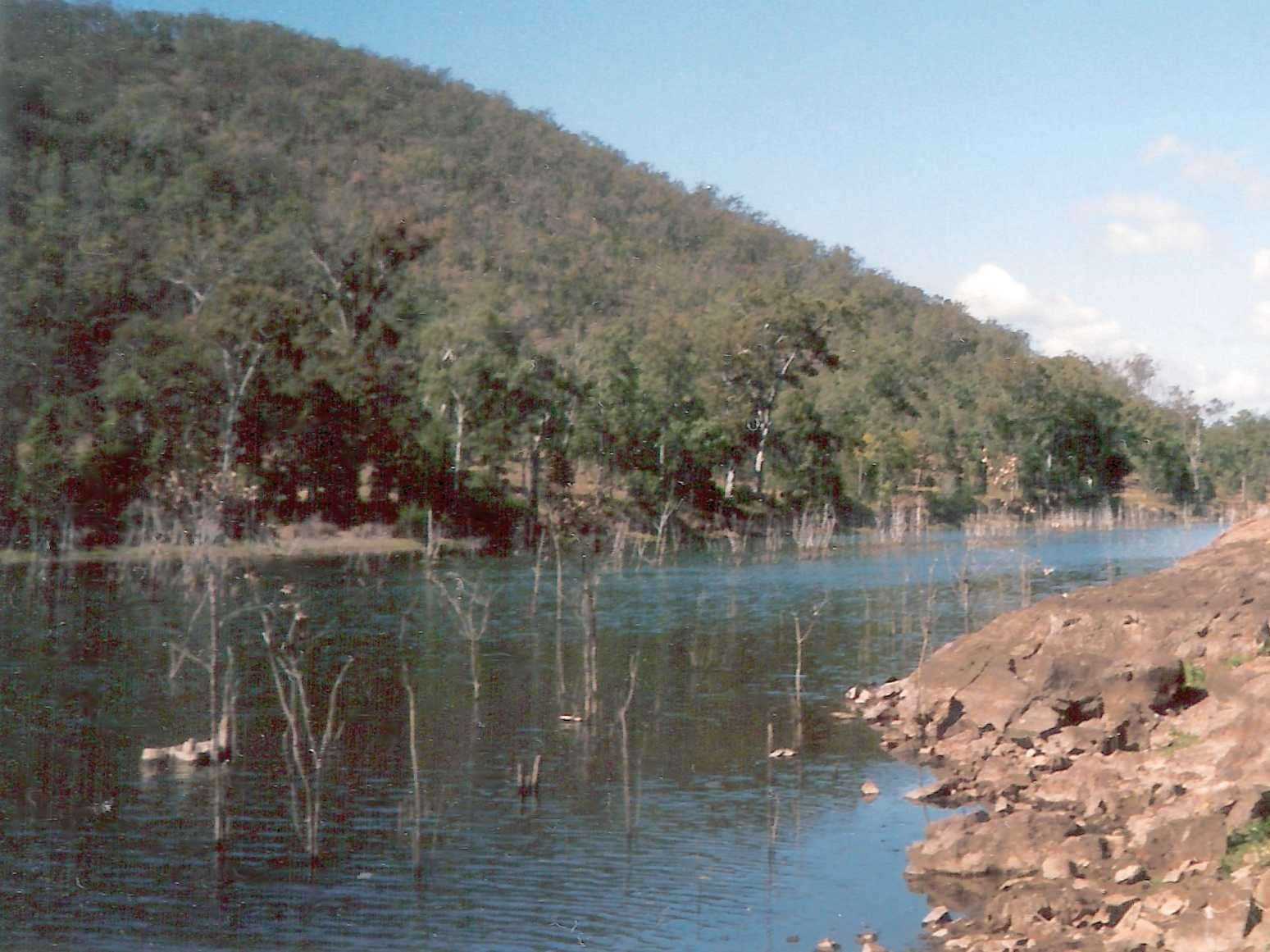
- Stanley River downstream from the Somerset Dam

- Location of the Stanley River mouth in Queensland

Location
- Country: Australia
- State: Queensland
- Region: South East Queensland
- Cities: Peachester, Kilcoy

Physical characteristics
- Source: Conondale Range
  - location: west of Landsborough
  - coordinates: 26°48′58″S 152°54′58″E
  - elevation: 216 m (709 ft)
- Mouth: confluence with the Brisbane River
  - location: below Lake Somerset
  - coordinates: 27°9′44″S 152°32′18″E
  - elevation: 64 m (210 ft)
- Length: 35 km (22 mi)
- Basin size: 1,535 km^{2} (593 sq mi)

Basin features
- River system: Brisbane River
- Tributaries
  - left: Neurem Creek, Stony Creek (Queensland), Blackrock Creek, Oaky Creek (Queensland), Reedy Creek (Queensland)
  - right: London Creek, Scrubby Creek, Sandy Creek (Queensland), Kilcoy Creek
- National park: Conondale National Park

The Stanley River is a perennial river in the South East region of Queensland, Australia. A major tributary of the Brisbane River, the Stanley River valley extends roughly 35 kilometres (22 mi) westwards from the area south of Maleny, through Woodford to Kilcoy before veering southwards.

== Course and features ==
Formed by runoff from the Jimna, Conondale, Bellthorpe and D'Aguilar ranges, the river rises west of Landsborough in the hinterland surrounding the Sunshine Coast and flows generally southwest, joined by eighteen minor tributaries before being impounded by the Somerset Dam built 7 kilometres (4.3 mi) upstream from its confluence with the Brisbane River. The dam was the principal water supply for Brisbane for some fifty years until the construction of the Wivenhoe Dam was completed, forming Lake Wivenhoe. The Stanley River tributaries include Ewen, Crohamhurst, London, Running, Blackrock, One Mile, Monkeybong, Delaney’s, Neurem, Stony, Marysmokes, Scrubby, Sandy, Kilcoy, Sheepstation, Oaky, Byron and Reedy Creeks.

The river courses through one of the heaviest rainfall areas in Australia. The average annual rainfall in the area is 925 millimetres (36.4 in).

Riparian vegetation around the Lake Somerset area have been almost completely cleared for grazing. In the upper reaches bushland remains mostly intact although wildlife corridors have been fragmented and fish stocks reduced.

The gastric-brooding frog is an extinct frog that was discovered in only three catchments, the Mary River, Mooloolah and Stanley Rivers. The endangered giant barred frog Mixophyes iteratu has also been recorded on the Stanley River.

== History ==
Before either dam was built the Stanley and Brisbane Rivers were both prone to flooding. Despite warnings instigated by Henry Somerset who saw flash flooding in the upper reaches of the Stanley River valley, the 1893 Black February floods caused severe flooding downstream in Brisbane and other towns such as Fernvale. The 1893 floods occurred after heavy rains near Peachester.

The river once marked the north-west boundary of the defunct County of Stanley.

== See also ==
- List of rivers of Australia § Queensland
