= Beerwah State High School =

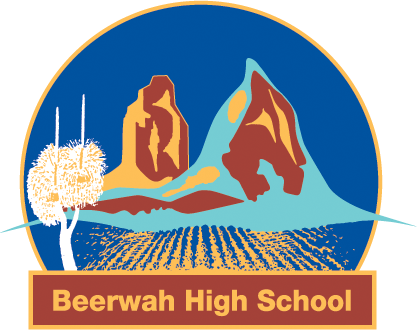

Location
- 35 Roberts Road; Queensland, 4519; Australia; 26°51′50.32″S 152°57′15.03″E

Information
- Type: Public school
- Motto: Success For All
- Established: 1992; 34 years ago
- School code: 2109
- Principal: Lyn Thomas
- Staff: 120
- Years offered: 7–12
- Enrolment: 1,020
- Colours: Maroon; Blue yellow
- Mascot: Crocodile
- Website: beerwahshs.eq.edu.au

Beerwah State High School (often abbreviated to Beerwah High School, Beerwah High or simply BSHS) is a government-owned secondary school in Beerwah, Queensland, Australia that was established in 1992.

== Faculties ==
Subject offerings at Beerwah State High School are organised around nine faculties. Each of these faculties is led by a Head of Department who is responsible for the quality of teaching, learning and assessment within their area of responsibility.

- Business Education and Information Technology Communications
- Communications
- Health and Physical Education
- Home Economics
- Industrial Technology
- Mathematics
- Science
- Social Science
- The Arts

== Specialist programs ==
Beerwah State High School offers three specialist programs: Athletics Extension Program, Music Extension Program and in 2012, an iLearn Program (which failed spectacularly). In 2017, a "bring your own device" program was introduced. The program still runs in Semester 2 of 2019 and usage of the network is slowly increasing across the school.

== Location and facilities ==
Beerwah State High School is located on Roberts Road. The school is located next to the local swimming pool (Beerwah Aquatic Centre), which serves as the venue for swimming training and the annual Swimming Carnival. Located within the school is a purpose-built assembly hall and indoor stadium, which hosts school assemblies, as well as interschool sporting events and physical education classes. The school also has a performing arts centre, which is used for school performances as well as for performing arts and dance classes. The school also features purpose-built chemistry laboratories, graphics and woodworking rooms and art facilities. The School is home to a great dance company (Beerwah Dance Company) spanning many year levels which over the years has won multiple awards.

== School sporting houses ==
Each house has a staff member as a house leader and two students as house captains.

House name	Colour
Miketeebumulgrai	Blue
Tibberoowuccum	Aqua
Ngungun	Yellow
Tunbubudla	Maroon

== Glass House Coalition of State Schools ==
Beerwah State High School is a member of the Glass House Coalition of State Schools, a partnership between schools in the Sunshine Coast Hinterland area.
