= Delaney (surname) =

Delaney is an English surname of Norman origin meaning "of the Alder grove". It is also the anglicized version of the Gaelic Ó Dubhshláine name Dubh meaning black and Sláine for the River Sláine (Slaney). Variants include Delaney, Delany and Dulaney.

== Notable people named Delaney or Delany ==
- Annie Elizabeth Delany "Bessie" (1891–1995), with sister "Sadie", African-American activist and author
- Anthony Delaney (born 1983), Irish historian and actor
- Arthur Delaney (1927–1987), English painter
- Arthur Delaney (politician) (1841–1905), first mayor of Juneau, Alaska, United States
- Beauford Delaney (1901–1979), American modernist painter
- Bob Delaney (basketball) (born 1951), American NBA referee
- Bob Delaney (politician) (born 1953), Ontario politician
- Bob DeLaney (sportscaster) (1924–2008), American radio commentator
- Cameron Delaney (disambiguation), multiple people
  - Cameron Delaney (swimmer) (born 1980), Australian swimmer
  - Cameron Delaney (footballer) (born 1992), Australian rules footballer
  - Cameron Delaney (basketball) (born 1995), American basketball player
- Colin Delaney, American professional wrestler
- Conor P. Delaney, Irish-American colorectal surgeon and professor
- Damien Delaney, Irish footballer
- Dana Delany (born 1956), American actress
- Daniel Delaney, American restaurateur
- Daniel Delany (1747–1814), Irish Catholic bishop
- David Delany (born 1997), Irish cricketer
- Dean Delany, Irish footballer
- Danny Delaney, GAA player
- Danny Delaney, shinty player - a great goal scorer or a scorer of great goals?
- Eamon Delaney, Irish author and former diplomat
- Edward Delaney, Irish sculptor
- Edward C. Delaney, creator of the Delaney Card
- Edward X. Delaney, the fictional detective in Lawrence Sanders' books
- Felix Ua Duib Sláin (Felix O'Dullaney), 12th–13th century bishop
- Frank Delaney, Irish writer and broadcaster
- Gareth Delany (born 1997), Irish international cricketer
- Garry Delaney, English boxer
- Gary Delaney, English stand-up comedian
- Jack Delaney, Canadian boxer in the early 20th century
- James Delaney (disambiguation), multiple people
  - James Delaney, a character in the British drama series, Taboo (2017 TV series)
  - James J. Delaney (1901–1987), Representative from New York
  - James Delaney (boxer), also known as Jimmy Doyle, boxer who died after a bout with Sugar Ray Robinson
  - James Delaney (mayor) (1896–1970), mayor of Anchorage, Alaska, 1929–1932
  - James Delaney (tennis) (born 1953), former professional tennis player
  - James Delany (born 1948), commissioner of the Big Ten Conference
- Jim Delaney (athlete) (1921–2012), American athlete
- Jimmy Delaney (1914–1989), Scottish footballer
- Joe Delaney, American football player
- John Delaney (disambiguation), multiple people
  - John Delaney (Bahamian lawyer) (born 1964), Attorney General and Minister of Legal Affairs
  - John Delaney (baseball) (born 1985), American college baseball coach
  - John Delaney (businessman) (1969–2011), Irish founder of website Intrade
  - John Delaney (Florida politician) (born 1956), American lawyer and university administrator
  - John Delaney (football administrator) (born 1967), Irish former sports administrator
  - John Delaney (Maryland politician) (born 1963), American attorney and businessman
  - John Delaney (meteorologist) (1811–1883), Irish-Canadian civil servant in Newfoundland
  - John Delaney (Wisconsin lawyer), or Delany, newspaperman and state representative
  - John A. Delaney (hurler) (born 1986), Irish hurler from County Laois
  - John A. Delany (1852–1907), Australian conductor and composer
  - John C. Delaney (1848–1915), American Civil War soldier
  - John J. Delaney (1878–1948), American businessman, lawyer and U.S. Representative
- Joseph Delaney (artist) (1904–1991), painter during the Harlem Renaissance
- Joseph Delaney (1945–2022), English author
- Joseph Patrick Delaney, American bishop
- Kathleen Delaney, American actress
- Kim Delaney, American actress
- Laura Delany (born 1992), Irish women's international cricket captain
- Lucy Delaney, African-American author
- Malcolm Delaney, American professional basketball player
- Mark Delaney (disambiguation), multiple people
  - Mark Delaney (boxer) (born 1971), English boxer
  - Mark Delaney (canoeist) (born 1964), Great Britain whitewater slalom canoeist
  - Mark Delaney (footballer) (born 1976), Wales international footballer
- Martin Delaney (disambiguation), multiple people
  - Martin Delaney (activist) (1945–2009), HIV/AIDS treatment advocate
  - Martin Delaney (actor), British actor
  - Martin Delany (1812–1885), African-American abolitionist
- Mary Delany (1700–1788), artist and writer
- Mattie Delaney, American blues singer and performer
- Michael Delaney (disambiguation), multiple people

- Michael C. Delaney (1849–1918), Canadian politician
- Michael Delaney (lawyer) (born 1969), American lawyer and politician
- Michael Delaney, stage name Dub-L, American record producer and songwriter
- Michael Delaney, Steve McQueen's character in Le Mans (film)

- Naamua Delaney, news anchor for CNN
- Padraic Delaney, Irish actor
- Pat Delaney (disambiguation), multiple people
  - Pat Delaney (footballer) (born 1940), Scottish footballer
  - Pat Delaney (Kilkenny hurler) (1942–2013), Irish hurler
  - Pat Delaney (Offaly hurler) (born 1954), Irish hurler
  - Pat Delany (born 1969), American politician
- Paul Delaney (disambiguation), multiple people
  - Paul Delaney (hurler) (born 1966), Irish hurler
  - Paul Delaney (professor) (fl. 1980s–2020s), professor of physics and astronomy in Toronto
  - Paul Delaney (basketball) (born 1986), American basketball player in the Israeli National League
  - Paul Delaney (rugby league) (born 1971), rugby league footballer
- Rob Delaney (born 1977), American comedian, writer, and actor
- Rob Delaney (baseball) (born 1984), baseball player and coach
- Robert Delaney (disambiguation), multiple people
  - Robert Delaney (cat burglar) (died 1948), British criminal
  - Robert Delaney (composer) (1903–1956), American composer
- Ron Delany (1935–2026) Irish gold medal Olympic athlete
- Samuel R. Delany (born 1942), American science fiction author
- Sarah Louise Delany "Sadie" (1889–1999), with sister "Bessie", African-American activist and author
- Sean Delaney (disambiguation), multiple people
  - Sean Delaney (musician) (1945–2003), American musician, producer, and road manager
  - Sean Delaney (sportsman) "Goggie" (1949–2004), Gaelic games sportsman from Ireland
  - Sean Delaney (actor) (born 1994), British actor of English-Irish descent
- Shelagh Delaney FRSL (1938–2011), British playwright
- Stephen Delaney (born 1962/63), Irish cyclist
- Thomas A. Delaney (1886–1969), American lawyer and politician
- Thomas Delaney (born 1991), Danish footballer, of US-Irish descent
- Thomas Delany (1868–1939), Irish lawyer and politician
- Tom Delaney (racing driver) (1911–2006), British racing driver
- Tom Delaney (songwriter), (1889–1963), American songwriter
- Walter S. DeLany (1891–1980), United States Navy admiral
- William Delaney (1866–1921), Australian cricketer
- William Delany (politician) (1855–1916), Irish MP for Queen's County Ossory
- William Delany (bishop) (1804–1886)
- William Delany (Jesuit) (1835–1924), President of University College Dublin

== See also ==
- Delaney (given name), including a list of people with the given name
- Delaney clause, a 1958 amendment to the Food, Drugs, and Cosmetic Act of 1938
- Delaney/Delany, Delannoy, De Launay, Delaunay, Delauney, Delone, Deloney, Delony
- Dulany, a surname
- Dulaney (disambiguation)
