= John Delaney =

John Delaney or Delany may refer to:

== People ==
=== Politicians ===
- John Delaney (Bahamian lawyer) (born 1964), Bahamian lawyer and former Attorney General and Minister of Legal Affairs
- John Delaney (Maryland politician) (born 1963), American attorney, businessman, politician, and former 2020 Democratic presidential candidate
- John Delaney (Florida politician) (born 1956), American lawyer, politician and university administrator
- John J. Delaney (1878–1948), American businessman, lawyer and U.S. Representative
- John Delaney (meteorologist) (1811–1883), Irish-Canadian civil servant, meteorologist and political figure in Newfoundland
- John DeLany (Wisconsin lawyer) (1824–1882), Wisconsin lawyer, newspaperman and state representative

=== Sports ===
- John A. Delaney (hurler) (born 1986), Irish hurler from County Laois
- John Delaney (baseball) (born 1985), American college baseball coach
- John Delaney (football administrator) (born 1967), Irish former sports administrator
- John Delaney (footballer) (1942–2026), English footballer

=== Others ===
- John Delaney (businessman) (1969–2011), Irish businessman and founder of trading exchange website Intrade
- John C. Delaney (1848–1915), American Civil War soldier
- John Delany (luthier) (1769–1838), Irish musical instrument and violin maker
- John Bernard Delany (1864–1906), American Roman Catholic bishop
- John Albert Delany (1852–1907), Australian conductor and composer

== Other ==
- John A. Delaney Student Union
- John Delaney 2020 presidential campaign

== See also ==
- Jack Delaney (1900–1948), Canadian boxer
