= Delaney (given name) =

- Gender: Unisex
- Language: English

Origin
- Languages: Norman French; Irish
- Origin: Delaney (surname)
- Region of origin: Ireland, Normandy

Other names
- Variant forms: Delany, Delanie, Lainey, Laney

Delaney is a unisex given name, a transferred use of a surname with Norman French or Irish origins. It was in use for both boys and girls in the Southern United States by the 1850s and has since been in regular use as a given name in the Anglosphere.

== Men ==
- Delaney Blaylock (born 1997), American professional basketball player
- Delaney Bramlett (1939–2008), American singer-songwriter, musician, and producer
- Delaney Davidson (born 1972), New Zealand singer-songwriter
- Delaney Rudd (born 1962), retired American professional basketball player
- Delaney Williams (born 1962), American actor

== Women ==
- Delaney Aikens (born 2000), Canadian rugby sevens player
- Delaney Burns (born 2001), English rugby union player
- Delaney Collins (born 1977), Canadian women's ice hockey player
- Delaney Gibb (born 2005), Canadian basketball player
- Delaney Gibson, American singer-songwriter
- Delaney Jane (born 1993), Canadian pop vocalist
- Delaney Miller (born 1995), American professional rock climber
- Delaney Baie Pridham (born 1997), American professional soccer player
- Delaney Rowe (born 1994 or 1995), American actress and influencer
- Delaney Schnell (born 1998), American diver
- Delaney Spaulding (born 1995), American softball player
- Delaney Strouse (born 2000), American curler

== See also ==
- Delaney (disambiguation)
- Delaney (surname)
- Delany (disambiguation)
- Delanie
