= Delaney =

Delaney may refer to:

== People ==
- Delaney (surname), including a list of people with the surname
- Delaney (given name), including a list of people with the given name

== Places ==
- Delaney, Arkansas, an unincorporated community
- Delaney, West Virginia, an unincorporated community
- Delaney Creek, a stream in Indiana
- Delaney Flood Control Project, a body of water in Stow, Massachusetts
- Rural localities in Queensland, Australia:
  - Delaneys Creek
  - Mount Delaney

== Other uses ==
- Delaney clause, part of an amendment to the United States' Food, Drug, and Cosmetic Act of 1938
- Delaney Cup, in Gaelic football, trophy for the winners of the Leinster Senior Football Championship
- Delaney's Donkey, song written by English composer William Hargreaves
