= Robert Delaney =

Robert, Rob or Bob Delaney may refer to:

- Robert Delaney (cat burglar) (died 1948), British criminal
- Robert Delaney (composer) (1903–1956), American composer
- Rob Delaney (born 1977), American and British comedian, writer, and actor
- Rob Delaney (baseball) (born 1984), baseball player and coach
- Bob Delaney (politician) (born 1953), Ontario politician
- Bob Delaney (basketball) (born 1951), American NBA referee
- Bob DeLaney (sportscaster) (1924–2008), American radio commentator
- Bob Delaney (runner) (born 1942), American middle-distance runner, 1965 NCAA outdoor mile runner-up for the BYU Cougars track and field team

== See also ==
- Delany (disambiguation)
- Robert Delannoy (fl. 1910s), World War I flying ace
