= Brisbane–Woodford Road =

Road in Queensland, Australia

Brisbane–Woodford Road Gympie Road, Dayboro Road, Mount Mee Road Queensland

General information
- Type: Road
- Length: 60.5 km (38 mi)
- Route number(s): Entire route

Major junctions
- South-east end: Gympie Road / Strathpine Sub-Arterial Road, Bald Hills
- South Pine Road; Samsonvale Road; Anzac Avenue; Youngs Crossing Road; Williams Street, Dayboro; Campbells Pocket Road; Delaney Creek Road
- North-west end: D'Aguilar Highway D'Aguilar

Location(s)
- Major suburbs: Petrie, Dayboro, Mount Mee

Brisbane–Woodford Road is the official name for a continuous 60.5-kilometre (37.6 mi) road route in the Moreton Bay local government area of Queensland, Australia. It is designated as part of State Route 58. It is a state-controlled road (number 401) part regional and part district, rated as a local road of regional significance (LRRS).

== Route description ==
Brisbane–Woodford Road is a continuous road route comprising three distinct components, each of which retains its former name:

- Gympie Road from Strathpine to Petrie.
- Dayboro Road from Petrie to Dayboro.
- Mount Mee Road from Dayboro to D'Aguilar.

=== Gympie Road ===
The road commences where Gympie Road crosses the South Pine River from Bald Hills to Strathpine. It is signed as State Route 58, which also continues east on Gympie Road and Strathpine Sub-Arterial Road (Note: Strathpine Sub-Arterial Road is a state-controlled regional road (number U93) rated as a local road of regional significance (LRRS). It is part of State Route 58.) to an intersection with the Bruce Highway. Gympie Road continues north-west through Strathpine and Lawnton to Petrie, a distance of 6.2-kilometre (3.9 mi). It is a four-lane divided road for its entire length. Land use along this road is mainly commercial.

In Strathpine, South Pine Road (State Route 28) exits to the south, and Samsonvale Road to the west. The road passes the Strathpine shopping centre and many commercial premises, crossing Four Mile Creek into Lawnton and the North Pine River into Petrie. As it enters Petrie it passes the Moreton Bay campus of the University of the Sunshine Coast and crosses the North Coast railway line.

At a three-way intersection in Petrie; Gympie Road ends, Brisbane-Woodford Road continues north-west as Dayboro Road (State Route 58), and Anzac Avenue runs north-east as State Route 71.

=== Dayboro Road ===
Dayboro Road
- Location: Gympie Road, Petrie to Mount Mee Road, Dayboro
- Length: 18.6 km (11.6 mi)

From Petrie, Dayboro Road runs north-west between Whiteside and Kurwongbah, through Rush Creek, and into Dayboro, a distance of 18.6-kilometre (11.6 mi). It is a two-lane sealed road for most of its length. Land use along the road is residential in Petrie and rural for the remainder. In Petrie, Youngs Crossing Road exits to the south-west. Just beyond the Petrie boundary the road passes between Lake Kurwongbah to the north and the North Pine Dam to the south. The road enters Dayboro as Hay Road, crossing Terrors Creek as it reaches the town.

At a T-junction in Dayboro; Hay Road ends, Brisbane-Woodford Road turns north as Mount Mee Road (State Route 58), and Williams Street runs west as State Route 22.

=== Mount Mee Road ===
Mount Mee Road
- Location: Dayboro Road, Dayboro to D'Aguilar Highway, D'Aguilar
- Length: 35.7 km (22.2 mi)

From Dayboro, Mount Mee Road runs north, following a circuitous route over the D'Aguilar Range to the locality of D'Aguilar, a distance of 35.7-kilometre (22.2 mi). It passes through King Scrub, Ocean View, Mount Mee and Delaneys Creek. It is a two-lane sealed road for its entire length. Land use along the road is almost totally rural. In Mount Mee, Campbells Pocket Road exits to the east, and in Delaneys Creek, Delaney Creek Road exits to the west. The road ends at a T-junction with the D'Aguilar Highway (State Route 85) in D'Aguilar. Woodford is about 4-kilometre (2.5 mi) to the north-west.

=== Upgrade projects ===
A project to develop a 20-year vision for the section of Dayboro Road between Gympie Road and Youngs Crossing Road in Petrie began in 2021. Community consultation occurred in the period October-November 2021.

A project to upgrade the intersection of Gympie Road, Anzac Avenue and Dayboro Road at Petrie, at a cost of $30 million, was completed in March 2022.

== History ==
A bridge over the South Pine River from Bald Hills to Strathpine was completed by 1866. Cobb & Co coaches travelled through the area from 1867.

In 1859 Tom Petrie acquired the lease of land in what is now the Petrie district. By 1870 a hostelry had been established on the land, as the location of the first change of horses for Cobb & Co coaches travelling north from Brisbane. The North Pine River was crossed at a ford nearby. In 1877 a low-level bridge was opened.

The Dayboro district was settled by Europeans from 1866. The railway did not arrive in Dayboro until 1920. A Motor transport service from Dayboro to Brisbane operated from the late 1920s, and a bus service from 1936. In 1937 this was extended to Mount Mee.

Timber-getters operated in the Mount Mee district from 1873. Before a sawmill was built locally the cut timber was transported to D'Aguilar and beyond.

== Major intersections ==
All distances are from Google Maps. The road is within the Moreton Bay local government area.

Location	km	mi	Destinations	Notes
Strathpine	0	0.0	Gympie Road / Strathpine Sub-Arterial Road – east – Bald Hills	South-eastern end of Brisbane–Woodford Road (State Route 58). (Crossing of South Pine River from Bald Hills to Strathpine on Gympie Road). Brisbane–Woodford Road runs north–west as Gympie Road.
Strathpine	1.3	0.81	South Pine Road – south – Brendale	Road continues north–west.
Strathpine	2.5	1.6	Samsonvale Road – west – Bray Park	Road continues north–west.
Petrie	6.2	3.9	Anzac Avenue – north–east – Kallangur	Name changes to Dayboro Road, which continues north–west.
Petrie	8.5	5.3	Youngs Crossing Road – south–west – Warner	Road continues north–west.
Dayboro	24.8	15.4	Williams Street – west – Dayboro	Name changes to Mount Mee Road, which runs north.
Mount Mee	48.0	29.8	Campbells Pocket Road – east – Campbells Pocket	Road continues north.
Delaneys Creek	57.1	35.5	Delaney Creek Road – west – Mount Delaney	Road continues south–east.
D'Aguilar	60.5	37.6	D'Aguilar Highway – north–west – Woodford – south–east – Bracalba.	North-western end of Brisbane–Woodford Road. Woodford is about 4-kilometre (2.5 mi) to the north–west.
1.000 mi = 1.609 km; 1.000 km = 0.621 mi: Route transition

== See also ==
- List of road routes in Queensland
- List of numbered roads in Queensland
