= William Delany =

William Delany may refer to:

- William Delany (politician)
- William Delany (Jesuit)
- William Delany (bishop)

== See also ==
- William Delaney, Australian cricketer
