= Paul Delaney =

Paul Delaney may refer to:

- Paul Delaney (hurler) (born 1966), Irish hurler
- Paul Delaney (professor) (fl. 1980s–2020s), professor of physics and astronomy at York University in Toronto
- Paul Delaney (basketball) (born 1986), American basketball player
- Paul Delaney (rugby league) (born 1971), rugby league footballer
