= Duhaney =

Duhaney may refer to:

== People ==
- Dahlia Duhaney, Jamaican sprinter
- Demeaco Duhaney, English footballer
- Mike Duhaney, American soccer player

== Other ==
- Duhaney Park F.C., Jamaican football team

== See also ==
- Dulaney (disambiguation)
