= Attorney General Delaney =

Attorney General Delaney may refer to:

- John Delaney (Bahamian lawyer) (born 1964), Attorney General of the Bahamas
- Michael Delaney (lawyer) (born 1969), Attorney General of New Hampshire
