= Delany =

Delany may refer to:

- Delany (surname)
- Delany (Upper Lusatia), an area in Germany
- Delany College, in Granville, New South Wales, Australia

== See also ==
- Delaney (disambiguation)
