= Mark Delaney =

Mark Delaney may refer to:

- Mark Delaney (footballer) (born 1976), Wales international footballer
- Mark Delaney (boxer) (born 1971), English boxer
- Mark Delaney (canoeist) (born 1964), Great Britain whitewater slalom canoeist
