= D'Aguilar, Queensland =

D'Aguilar Queensland
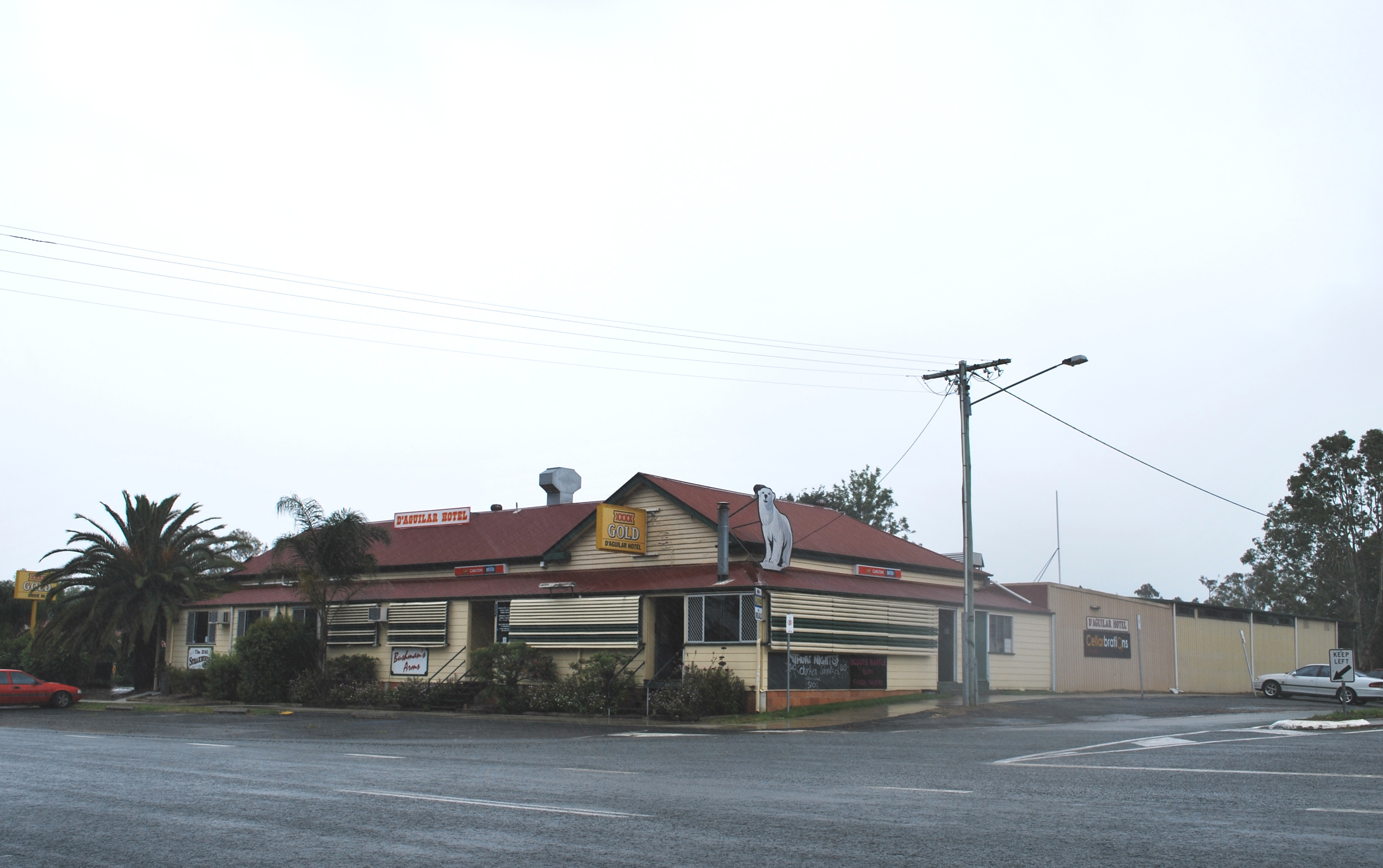
- D'Aguilar Hotel

- Coordinates: 26.9897°S 152.8°E
- Population: 1,474 (2021 census)
  - Density: 147.4/km^{2} (381.8/sq mi)
- Postcode(s): 4514
- Area: 10.0 km^{2} (3.9 sq mi)
- Time zone: AEST (UTC+10:00)
- Location: 4.4 km (3 mi) SSE of Woodford; 20.5 km (13 mi) NW of Caboolture; 74.2 km (46 mi) NNW of Brisbane CBD
- LGA(s): City of Moreton Bay
- State electorate(s): Glass House
- Federal division(s): Longman
Localities around D'Aguilar:
Woodford	Woodford	Woodford
Woodford; Delaneys Creek	D'Aguilar	Bracalba
Delaneys Creek	Delaneys Creek; Bracalba	Bracalba

D'Aguilar is a rural town and locality in the City of Moreton Bay, Queensland, Australia. It is located northwest of the larger centre of Caboolture. In the 2021 census, the locality of D'Aguilar had a population of 1,474 people, while the town of D'Aguilar had a population of 1,341 people.

== Geography ==
D'Aguilar lies on the D'Aguilar Highway between Wamuran and Woodford. It is also the northern endpoint of Brisbane–Woodford Road (Mount Mee Road), which leads south through Delaneys Creek and Mount Mee to Dayboro. A small section of the Beerburrum West State Forest is in D'Aguilar.

== History ==
The town is named for Major General Sir George D'Aguilar, a military officer who wrote Regulations and Punishments of the British Army, the army textbook in use at the time of the town's establishment. As time passed, the mountain range that the town is situated in came to be named after the town.

== Demographics ==
In the 2016 census, the locality of D'Aguilar had a population of 1,207 people, while the town of D'Aguilar had a population of 1,008 people.

In the 2021 census, the locality of D'Aguilar had a population of 1,474 people with a median age of 36 and weekly income of $1,896, while the town of D'Aguilar had a population of 1,341 people.

== Education ==
There are no schools in D'Aguilar. The nearest government primary schools are Delaneys Creek State School in neighbouring Delaneys Creek to the south and Woodford State School in neighbouring Woodford to the north. The nearest government secondary schools are Woodford State School (to Year 10) in Woodford and Tullawong State High School (to Year 12) in Caboolture to the south-east.
