= Martin Delaney =

Martin Delaney may refer to:

- Martin Delaney (activist) (1945–2009), HIV/AIDS treatment advocate
- Martin Delaney (actor) (born 1982), British actor
- Martin Delaney (coach) (1872–1926), American college football and track and field coach

== See also ==
- Martin Delany (1812–1885), African-American abolitionist
