= Mount Mee, Queensland =

Mount Mee
- Town
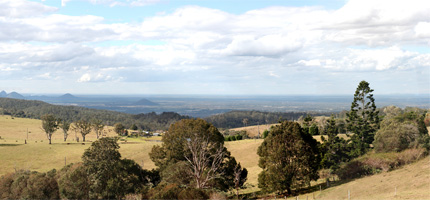
- Panorama from Mount Mee lookout

- Interactive map of Mount Mee
- Coordinates: 27.0588°S 152.7666°E
- Country: Australia
- State: Queensland
- LGA: City of Moreton Bay
- Location: 22.9 km (14.2 mi) W of Caboolture; 66.8 km (41.5 mi) NNW of Brisbane CBD
- Established: 1873

Government
  - State electorate: Glass House
  - Federal division: Longman

Area
  - Total: 77.5 km^{2} (29.9 sq mi)
- Elevation: 501 m (1,644 ft)

Population
  - Total: 519 (2021 census)
  - Density: 6.697/km^{2} (17.345/sq mi)
- Time zone: UTC+10:00 (AEST)
- Postcode: 4521
Localities around Mount Mee
Mount Delaney	Delaneys Creek	Wamuran Basin
Mount Archer	Mount Mee	Campbells Pocket
Mount Byron	Mount Pleasant	Ocean View

Mount Mee is a rural town and locality in the City of Moreton Bay, Queensland, Australia. In the 2021 census, the locality of Mount Mee had a population of 519 people.

== Geography ==
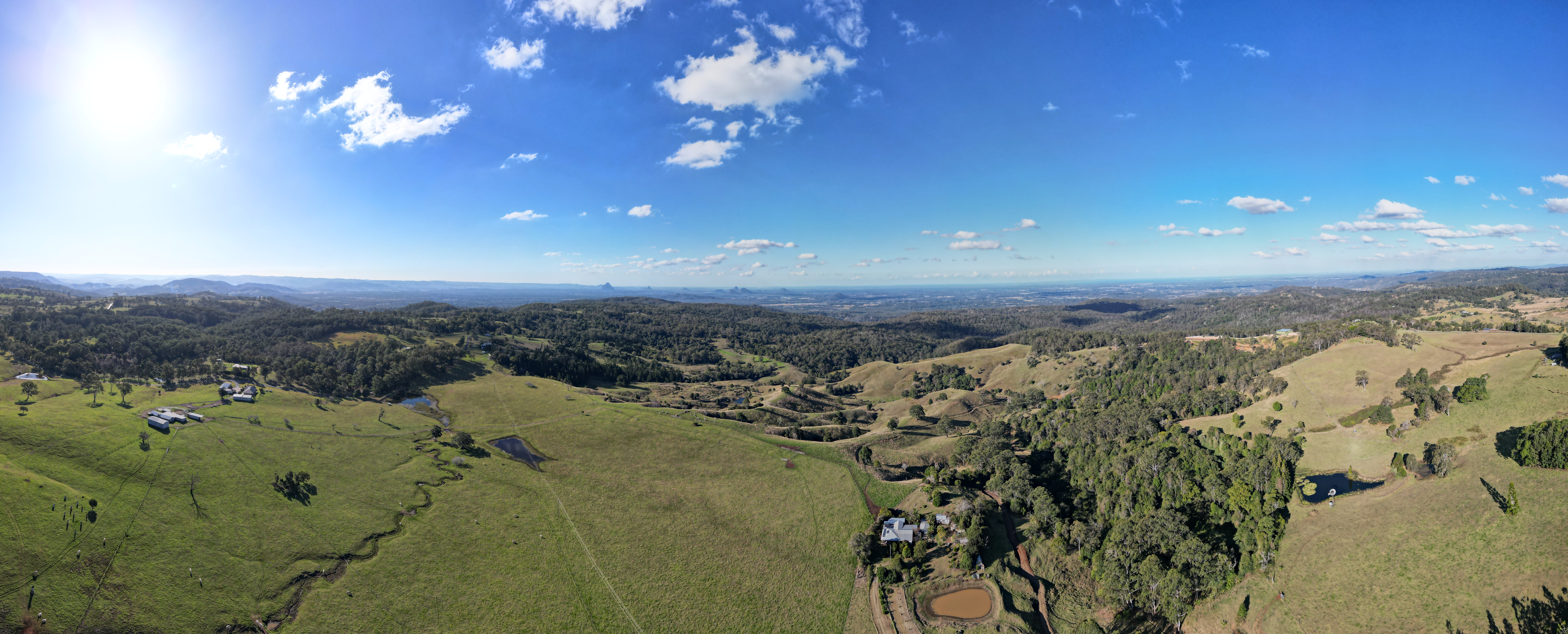
Aerial panorama from Mount Mee lookout. June 2023.

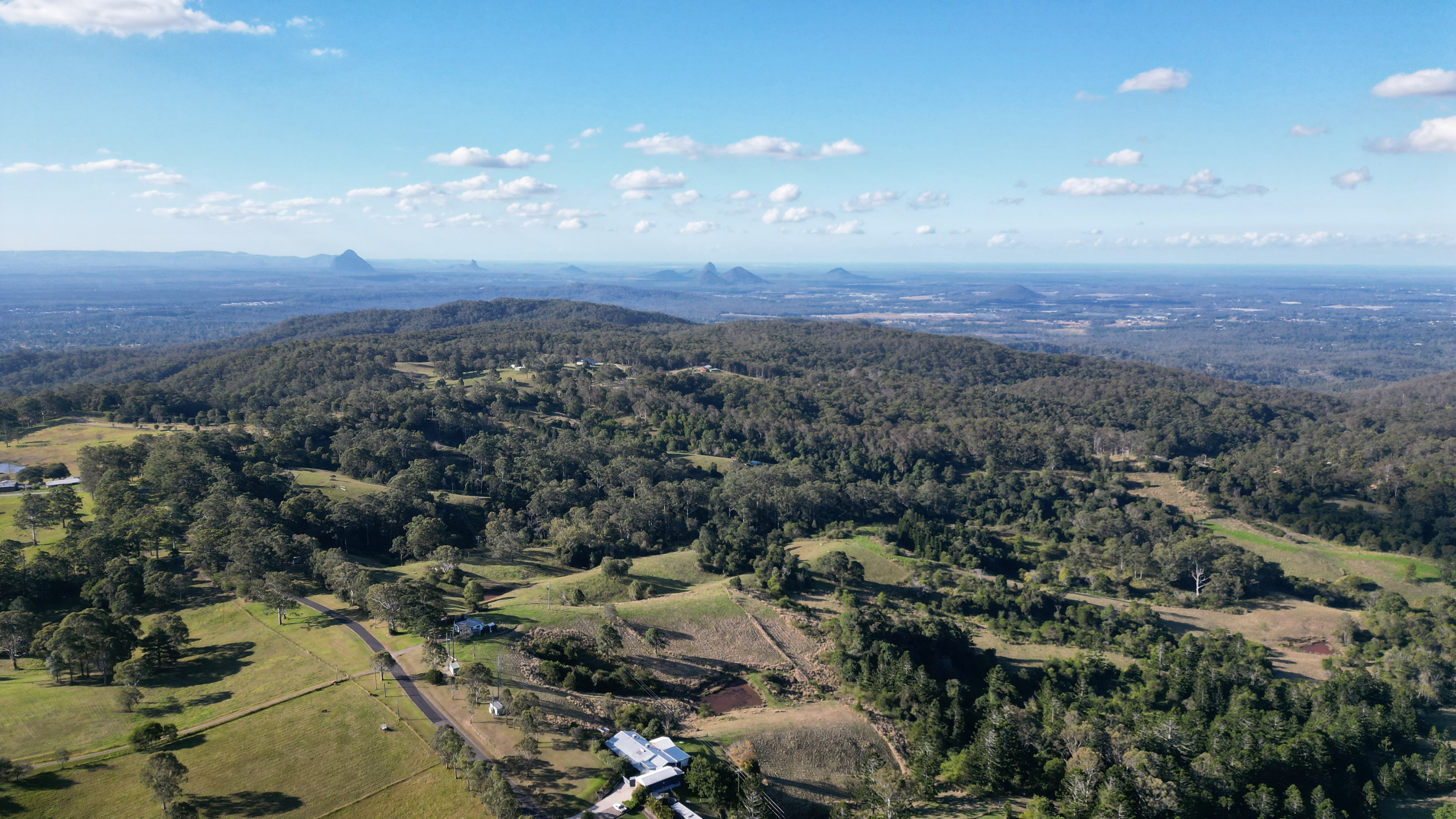
Mount Mee and surrounds from above. June 2023.

Mount Mee (also known as Bonnie Knob) is a mountain, located north of the town of Dayboro, in the D'Aguilar Range(27.0797°S 152.7814°E), rising 498 metres (1,634 ft) above sea level.

Brisbane–Woodford Road (Mount Mee Road) runs through from south to north.

== History ==
The area around Mount Mee was known to the indigenous inhabitants of the area as Dahmongah, a word meaning "flying squirrel" or glider. The English name Mount Mee is possibly derived from another local word mia-mia, meaning a view or lookout, but this name was not formalised until the establishment of the school in 1899.

Settlers began arriving in the area around Mount Mee in 1873, many being timber-getters attracted by the red cedar timber that was readily available in the area. Initially, timber cut down in the area was exported to the nearby towns of Caboolture, D'Aguilar and Woodford, but a sawmill was eventually built in the fledgling town. A number of larger mills were operated on various parts of the mountain until the last closed in 1982.

Dahmongah Provisional School opened on 20 February 1884. In 1900, it was renamed Mount Mee Provisional School. It closed in 1904 due to low student numbers but opened again in 1909. On 1 October 1909, it became Mount Mee State School.

Mount Mee Methodist Church was consecrated on 16 December 1922, where it operated as a community church which could be used for any Christian purpose. As of July 2023 it has closed operations.

Mount Mee Public Hall opened in 1933.

A special tractor called the Linn tractor was used to haul logs instead of bullock teams in the early 1930s. Over time, agriculture became important to the economy of the area, with dairy farms and banana plantations being particularly important.

Mount Mee Banana Settlement State School opened on 4 April 1934 and closed circa 1939.

Mount Mee was initially governed as a part of the Caboolture Divisional Board, later the Shire of Caboolture. In 2008, the shire was amalgamated with Pine Rivers Shire and Redcliffe City to form the Moreton Bay Region (now known as the City of Moreton Bay).

== Demographics ==
In the 2016 census, the locality of Mount Mee had a population of 484 people.

In the 2021 census, the locality of Mount Mee had a population of 519 people. The median age of the Mount Mee population was 52 years, 14 years above the national and state median of 38. 77.5% of people living in Mount Mee were born in Australia. The other top responses for country of birth were England at 4.4%, New Zealand at 1.9%, Scotland at 1% and South Africa at 0.8%. 87.5% of people spoke only English at home; the next most common languages were German and Spanish at 1%, though these households only numbered in the single digits. 43.9% of the population listed their ancestry as English, and 36.2% said their ancestry was Australian. The next highest responses were Scottish, Irish and German. 1.3% of the population were Aboriginal Australians or Torres Strait Islanders, below the Queensland average of 4.6%.

== State Forest and Forest Reserve ==
Mount Mee State Forest and Forest Reserve is a nature preserve located in Mount Mee. It features eucalyptus forests, small sections of rainforest, and plantations of hoop pine. They adjoin the Brisbane Forest Park. The park features six different walking tracks, two picnic grounds, a camping ground, and numerous tracks for offroad driving.

== Education ==
Mount Mee State School is a government primary (Prep-6) school for boys and girls at 1368 Mt Mee Road (27.0806°S 152.7711°E). In 2017, the school had an enrolment of 72 students with 9 teachers (5 full-time equivalent) and 5 non-teaching staff (3 full-time equivalent). In 2018, the school had an enrolment of 70 students with 9 teachers (4 full-time equivalent) and 5 non-teaching staff (3 full-time equivalent). In 2021, this number declined to 53 students and 8 teachers (3.9 full-time equivalent) and 7 non-teaching staff (3.6 full-time equivalent).

There are no secondary schools in Mount Mee. The nearest government secondary school is Woodford State School (to Year 10) in Woodford to the north. For secondary education to Year 12, the options are Tullawong State High School in Caboolture to the east, Kilcoy State High School in Kilcoy to the north-west, and Bray Park State High School in Bray Park to the south-east.

== Amenities ==
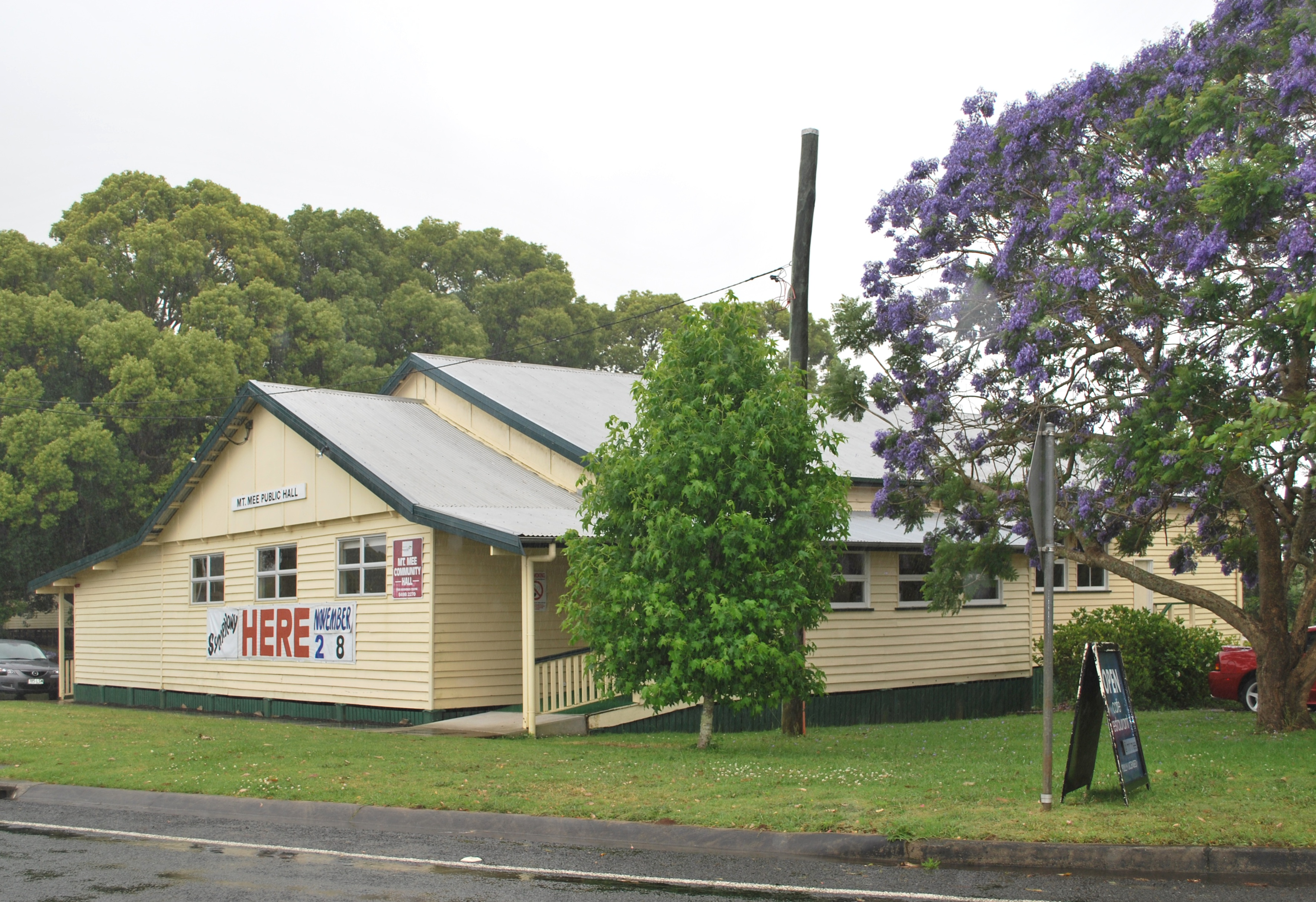
Mount Mee Public Hall, 2010

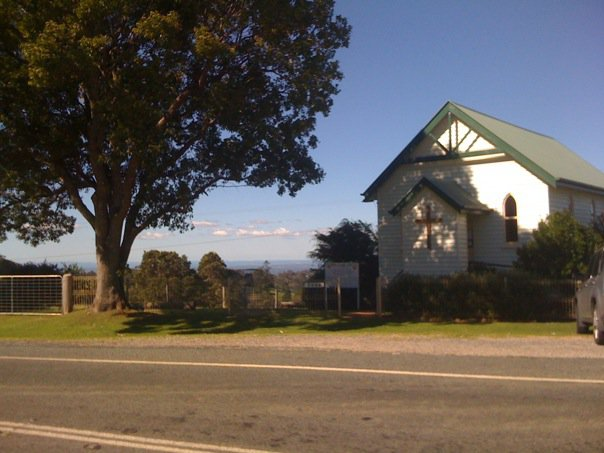
Mount Mee Community Church, 2010

The Moreton Bay City Council operates a mobile library service which visits near the Mount Mee Public Hall at 1352 Mount Mee Road (27.0806°S 152.7719°E). The council also operates the hall with the assistance of local volunteers.

The historic Mount Mee Community Church, which ceased operations in 2023 and is currently for sale, can be seen at 1345 Mount Mee Road (27.0806°S 152.7727°E) across the road from the Community Hall. It has views from the mountain.

Mount Mee Cemetery is at 1 Cemetery Road, off Settlement Road (27.0586°S 152.7559°E).

== Attractions ==
The Pitstop Cafe has excellent views, a large range of automotive and racing memorabilia and food.

Lookouts at Mount Mee in D'Aguilar National Park include:

- Falls Lookout (27.0825°S 152.6969°E)
- Bulls Lookout (27.0827°S 152.6965°E)

both of which are accessed from the Falls Lookout Track which commences from Neurem Road.
