= Cameron Delaney =

Cameron Delaney may refer to:

- Cameron Delaney (swimmer) (born 1980), Australian swimmer
- Cameron Delaney (footballer) (born 1992), Australian rules footballer
- Cameron Delaney (basketball) (born 1995), American basketball player
