= Linda Grinberg =

American film librarian (1951–2002)

- Born: Linda Gwen Grinberg; May 26, 1951; Los Angeles, California
- Died: May 27, 2002 (aged 51); Los Angeles, California
- Other name: Linda G. Melnick
- Occupations: Film librarian, HIV/AIDS activist

Linda Gwen Grinberg (May 26, 1951 – May 27, 2002) was an American film librarian and HIV/AIDS activist, based in Los Angeles.

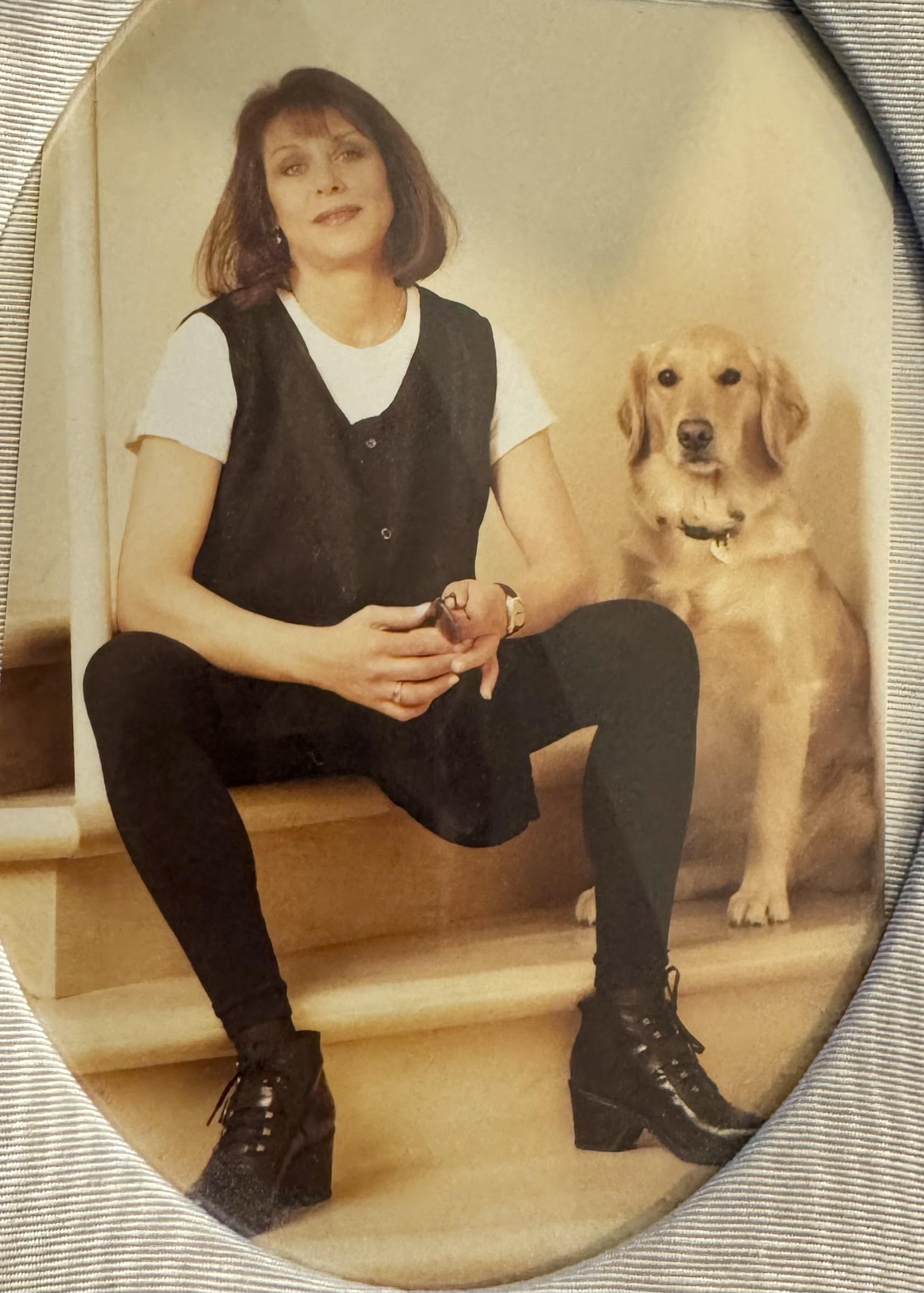
Linda, with her dog

== Early life and education ==
Grinberg was born in Los Angeles, the daughter of film executive Sherman Grinberg and Edna Trachtenberg Grinberg. She graduated from California State University, Northridge.

== Career ==
Grinberg was CEO of the Sherman Grinberg Film Libraries, "the world's largest independent film news and stock footage library". She was a co-founder and vice-president of the International Documentary Association.

Grinberg sold the film archive in the 1990s to focus her full-time attentions on HIV/AIDS activism and fundraising. She served on the board of Project Inform, was founder of the Coalition for Salvage Therapy, co-founder of the FAIR Pricing Coalition, and founder and president of the Foundation for AIDS and Immune Research (FAIR). She helped to lead a broad coalition of patients, activists, and medical practitioners, concerned for expediting new treatments for AIDS and ensuring access to experimental therapies, especially for late-stage patients with limited prognoses. "The side effects of AIDS [are] death," she told KQED about the urgency of her work. "We can gather data until hell freezes over, but we will be burying people daily. At a certain point we have to act."

Grinberg was honored with the Project Inform Activism Award in 1996.

== Personal life ==
Grinberg married journalist Philip Melnick in 1974; they divorced in 1981 Grinberg caught HIV in the 1980s, and was diagnosed with AIDS in 1991. With access to new treatments, she lived far longer than her doctors expected. She died at home in Los Angeles, from a heart attack related to her AIDS diagnosis and treatment, in 2002, aged 51 years.
