= Wamuran Basin, Queensland =

Wamuran Basin Queensland
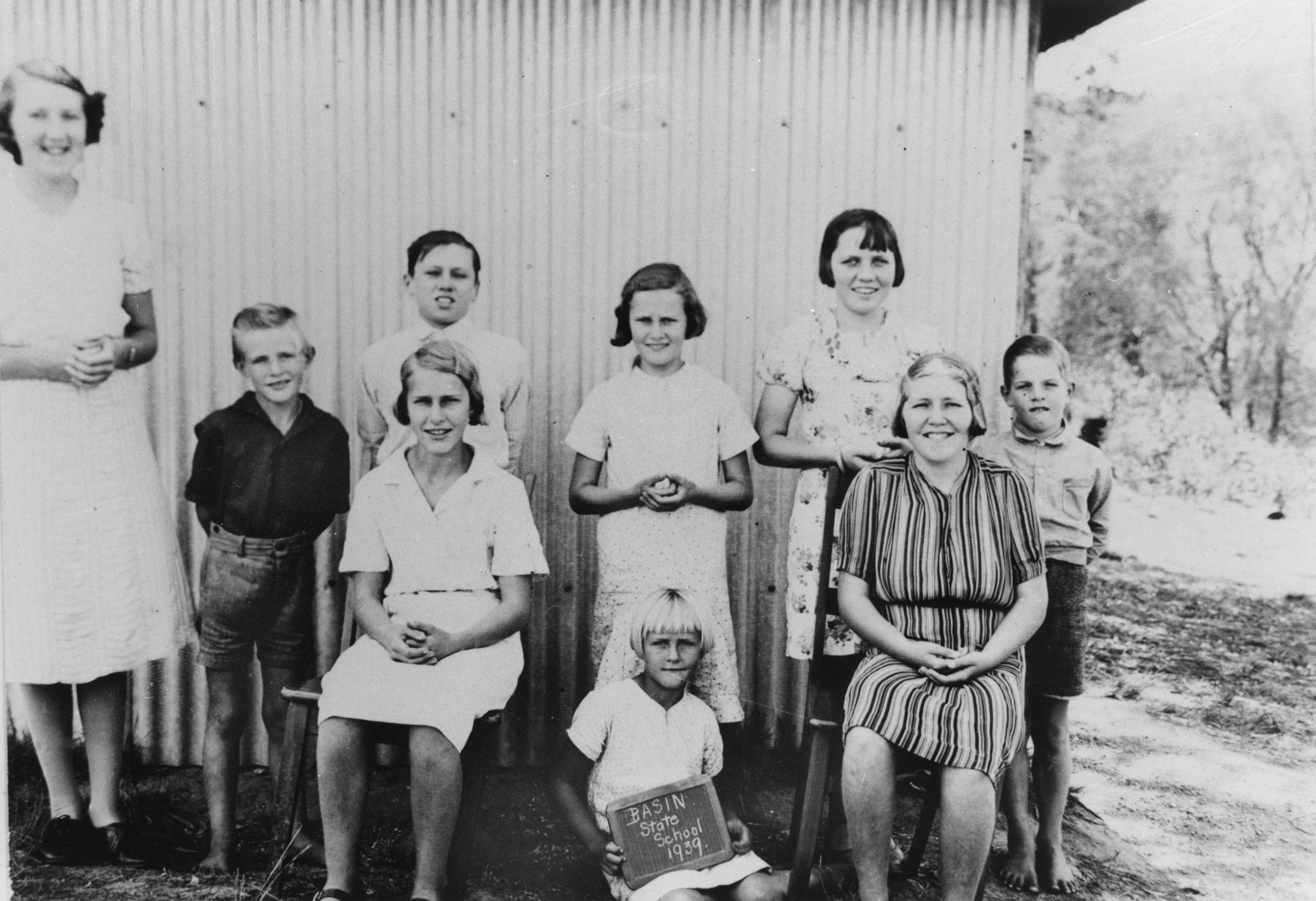
- Staff and students at Basin State School, 1939

- Coordinates: 27.0491°S 152.8227°E
- Population: 199 (2021 census)
  - Density: 18.77/km^{2} (48.6/sq mi)
- Postcode(s): 4512
- Area: 10.6 km^{2} (4.1 sq mi)
- Time zone: AEST (UTC+10:00)
- Location: 16.0 km (10 mi) NW of Caboolture; 64.5 km (40 mi) NNW of Brisbane CBD
- LGA(s): City of Moreton Bay
- State electorate(s): Glass House
- Federal division(s): Longman
Suburbs around Wamuran Basin:
Delaneys Creek	Bracalba	Wamuran
Mount Mee	Wamuran Basin	Wamuran
Mount Mee	Campbells Pocket	Wamuran

Wamuran Basin is a rural locality in the City of Moreton Bay, Queensland, Australia. In the 2021 census, Wamuran Basin had a population of 199 people.

== History ==
The locality takes its name from a local Aboriginal man, Menvil Wamuran (also known as Jacky Delaney).

Basin State School opened on 2 March 1920. It closed in 1957. It was unofficially known as Wamuran Basin State School. It was at 4 R Sampson Road (27.0458°S 152.8262°E).

== Demographics ==
In the 2016 census, Wamuran Basin had a population of 130 people.

In the 2021 census, Wamuran Basin had a population of 199 people.

== Education ==
There are no school in Wamuran Basin. The nearest government primary schools are Wamuran State School in neighbouring Wamuran to the east and Mount Mee State School in neighbouring Mount Mee to the south-west. The nearest government secondary schools are Tullawong State High School (to Year 12) in Caboolture to the east and Woodford State School (to Year 10) in Woodford to the north-west.
