= Patrick Delany =

Patrick Delany may refer to:

- Patrick Delany (theologian) (1686–1768), Irish clergyman
- Patrick Bernard Delany (1845–1924), American electrician and inventor
- Patrick Delany (archbishop) (1853–1926), Archbishop of Hobart, Tasmania
- Pat Delany, former member of the New Jersey General Assembly

== See also ==
- Pat Delaney (disambiguation)
