= James Delaney =

James Delaney may refer to:

- James J. Delaney (1901–1987), representative from New York
- James Delaney (tennis) (born 1953), former professional tennis player
- James Delaney (mayor) (1896–1970), mayor of Anchorage, Alaska, 1929–1932
- James Delaney (Taboo), a character in the British television drama series, Taboo
- Jimmy Delaney (1914–1989), Scottish footballer
- James Delaney (boxer), also known as Jimmy Doyle, boxer who died after a bout with Sugar Ray Robinson
- Jim Delaney (shot putter) (1921–2012), American shot putter
- Jim Delaney (racing driver) (1928–1991), NASCAR pioneer

== See also ==
- Jim Delany (born 1948), commissioner of the Big Ten Conference
