= James M. Campbell =

American politician

James M. Campbell was an American politician from Stevens Point, Wisconsin who was elected in the fall of 1847 to serve a single one-year term as a Democratic member of the Wisconsin State Assembly representing Portage County in the 1st Wisconsin Legislature of 1848. He was succeeded by fellow Democrat John Delaney. In January 1847, he'd been appointed as a notary public. In December 1847, he was serving as tax collector for the county.
