= 107th Pennsylvania Infantry Regiment =

Union Army infantry regiment

107th Pennsylvania Volunteer Infantry
- Active: February 20, 1862 to July 13, 1865
- Country: United States
- Allegiance: Union
- Branch: Infantry
- Engagements: Battle of Cedar Mountain; Second Battle of Bull Run; Battle of Chantilly; Battle of South Mountain; Battle of Antietam; Battle of Fredericksburg; Battle of Chancellorsville; Battle of Gettysburg; Bristoe Campaign; Mine Run Campaign; Battle of the Wilderness; Battle of Spotsylvania Court House; Battle of North Anna; Battle of Totopotomoy Creek; Battle of Cold Harbor; Siege of Petersburg; Battle of Hatcher's Run; Appomattox Campaign; Battle of Five Forks; Battle of Appomattox Court House

The 107th Pennsylvania Volunteer Infantry was an infantry regiment that served in the Union Army during the American Civil War.

== Service ==
The 107th Pennsylvania Infantry was organized at Harrisburg, Pennsylvania, on February 20, 1862, and mustered on March 8, 1862, for three years service under the command of Colonel Thomas A. Zeigle.

The 107th Pennsylvania Infantry mustered out July 13, 1865.

== Casualties ==
The regiment lost a total of 251 men during service; 2 officers and 106 enlisted men killed or mortally wounded, 3 officers and 140 enlisted men died of disease.

== Commanders ==
- Colonel Thomas A. Zeigle – died July 16, 1862, at Warrenton, Virginia
- Colonel Thomas Franklin McCoy
- Lieutenant Colonel James McThomson – commanded at the Battle of Gettysburg until wounded in action on July 1
- Major Henry J. Shaefer – commanded during the Bristoe Campaign
- Captain Emanuel D. Roath – commanded at the Battle of Gettysburg after Ltc McThomson was wounded

== Notable members ==
- Sergeant John C. Delaney, Company I – Medal of Honor recipient for action at the Battle of Hatcher's Run

== See also ==
- List of Pennsylvania Civil War Units
- Pennsylvania in the Civil War
