= Project Inform =

American advocacy group

- Formation: 1984
- Headquarters: San Francisco, California
- Interim Executive Director: David Evans
- Website: Article title

Project Inform is an American advocacy group dedicated to improving the health of and empowering people with HIV and hepatitis C, involving them in the process of developing therapies for the disease, and ending the AIDS pandemic. The organization deliberately focuses its efforts on issues that few other agencies address. Main areas of focus include drug development, bio-medical prevention, education and health care access.

In the years since its founding the work of Project Inform helped to found the community-based HIV research movement, helped to proliferate HIV treatment education and make it available to patients and care providers, and lead a national movement to accelerate approval by the U. S. Food and Drug Administration of critical drugs and other treatments for AIDS.

PI was founded in 1984 by Martin Delaney and Joe Brewer. Linda Grinberg served on the board of Project Inform before her death in 2002, and received the group's Activism Award in 1996.
