= Delanie =

Delanie is the name of:

- Delanie Forbes (born 1976), English actress
- Delanie Gourley (born 1995), American softball pitcher
- Taryn Delanie Smith (born 1997/1998), African-American beauty pageant competitor
- Delanie Walker (born 1984), American football tight end
- Delanie Wiedrich (born 1996), American beauty pageant titleholder

== See also ==
- Delaney (disambiguation)
