= Naamua Delaney =

Naamua Delaney Sullivan
- Born: 17 March 1973 (age 52); Kent, England
- Education: L.L.B., London
- Occupation: Television Journalist

Naamua Delaney Sullivan is a former news anchor for CNN from December 2007 to November 2009. She began her career as an entertainment reporter for MTN in Winnipeg, Canada. She graduated from Law School at the University of London.

Born in Kent, England, Naamua graduated with an L.L.B law degree from University College London. She then traveled to Vancouver, Canada on the Student Work Abroad Program, and began working first for a local newspaper, and then for a music/entertainment show as a writer and co-host. In 1996 Naamua landed her first broadcasting job with the Manitoba Television Network in Winnipeg, Canada. She then spent two years as an entertainment reporter and host at Vancouver Television, part of the Canadian Television Network.

Now living in the Atlanta area, Naamua enjoys being an involved member of her community. She has participated in many charitable and educational events, including serving as a moderator for the Harvard Business School's 30th annual H. Naylor Fitzhugh Conference; as an emcee for Action for Boston Community Development's 40th Annual Awards Dinner and an emcee of the United Way's Champion of Change award ceremony.

In 1999, she joined CTV in Vancouver as an entertainment reporter and then moved to WFXT in Boston in 1999, where she was an entertainment/lifestyles reporter. Delaney joined WNYW in New York in 2003 as an entertainment and lifestyle reporter and was the recipient of an Emmy in 2005. Before joining CNN.com, Delaney was the host of a daily talk show with the NBC network's iVillage Live.

Naamua's father is Ghanaian and her mother is British.

On 12 November 2009, Naamua, plus three others, were let go from CNN.com live. Naamua's bio was removed from the CNN page.

She was formerly the Director, Executive & International Communications at General Mills.

Her husband is from the US and she has two sons.
