= Delany (Upper Lusatia) =

Coordinates: 51°18′42.228969″N 14°14′0.509033″E

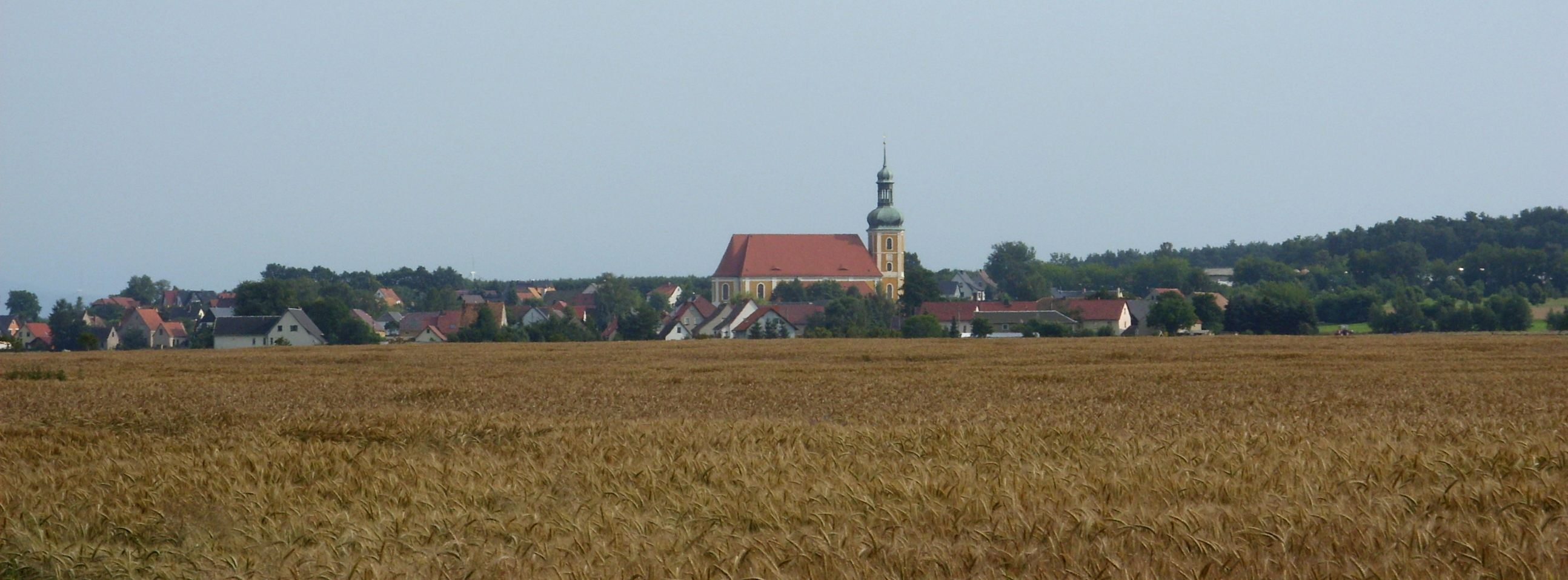
Rosenthal with its pilgrimage church

Delany (Sorbian for "lowland") is the usual name for the low-lying, larger part of the former estate of St. Marienstern Abbey in Panschwitz-Kuckau in German Lusatia. The region is in the centre of Bautzen district along the River Klosterwasser in Upper Lusatia. It lies between the villages of Räckelwitz (Worklecy) to the south and Wittichenau (Kulow) to the north and is part of the heart of the present-day Sorbian language region.

Unlike Oberland around Crostwitz and Panschwitz the Niederland has sandier, less fertile soils and a larger proportion of woodland.

Other villages in the Niederland are Ralbitz, Rosenthal, Schönau and Sollschwitz. From the 16th to the 19th century, all the aforementioned villages fell within the territory of Marienstern Abbey and are thus still Roman Catholic today.
