= Sean Delaney =

Sean Delaney may refer to:

- Sean Delaney (musician) (1945–2003), American musician, producer, and road manager
- Sean Delaney (sportsman) (1949–2004), Gaelic games sportsman from Ireland
- Sean Delaney (actor) (born 1994), from England
