= Delaney, West Virginia =

Unincorporated community in West Virginia, United States

Delaney
- Unincorporated community
- Location within the state of West Virginia Delaney (the United States)
- Coordinates: 39°19′54″N 81°28′26″W
- Country: United States
- State: West Virginia
- County: Wood
- Elevation: 656 ft (200 m)
- Time zone: UTC-5 (Eastern (EST))
  - Summer (DST): UTC-4 (EDT)
- GNIS ID: 1560371

Delaney was an unincorporated community in Wood County, West Virginia, United States.
