= Delaney Blaylock =

American basketball player (born 1997)

Free agent
- Position: Shooting guard / Small forward

Personal information
- Born: January 17, 1997 (age 29) Wyoming, Michigan
- Listed height: 1.96 m (6 ft 5 in)
- Listed weight: 86 kg (190 lb)

Career information
- High school: Godwin Heights (Wyoming, Michigan)
- College: Lewis (2015–2019)
- NBA draft: 2019: undrafted
- Playing career: 2019–present

Career history
- 2019–2020: Belfast Star
- 2020–2021: Odesa
- 2021–2022: Povoa
- 2022–2023: HLA Alicante
- 2023–2024: Apollon Patras

Career highlights
- Irish League MVP (2020); Irish League champion (2020); All-Irish League First Team (2020); First-team All-GLVC (2019); 2x Second-team All-GLVC (2017, 2018); GLVC Freshman of the Year (2016)

Delaney Lamar Blaylock (born January 17, 1997) is an American professional basketball player who last played for Apollon Patras of the Greek Basket League. After playing four years of college basketball at Lewis, Blaylock entered the 2019 NBA draft, but he was not selected in the draft's two rounds.

== High school career ==
During high school, Blaylock attended Godwin Heights Public School, in Wyoming, Michigan. In his last season at Godwin Heights, he averaged 18.7 points and 10 rebounds per game. Blaylock led Godwin to their first ever Class B State Championship in his senior year.

== College career ==
After high school, Blaylock played college basketball at Lewis, from 2015 to 2019. In his senior year at Lewis, Blaylock averaged 14 points and 6.6 rebounds per game. He was also mentioned to the GLVC All-First Team, and was also mentioned as the Freshman of the Year.

== Professional career ==
After failing to be drafted in the 2019 NBA draft, Blaylock signed with Belfast Star of the Irish League. In the end of the season, he managed to win the Irish League with the Star, and was named the league's MVP.

On August 12, 2023, Blaylock joined Odesa, of the Ukrainian Basketball SuperLeague. The following year, Blaylock played with Povoa in Portugal.

On July 6, 2023, Blaylock joined HLA Alicante of LEB Oro.

On August 3, 2023, Blaylock joined Apollon Patras of the Greek Basket League. On March 13, 2024, he was sidelined for the rest of the season due to an injury. In 15 games, he averaged 4.2 points and 2.3 rebounds in 16 minutes of play.

In the 2024–2025 season, he joined one of Portugal’s basketball clubs with a history of success, A.D. Ovarense, based in the city of Ovar in the central-northern region of the country. Once again in his career, he played a key role on the team, consistently delivering outstanding performances in nearly every game, both defensively and offensively. He stood out for his athleticism, defensive prowess, and ability to score in crucial moments.
