= Danny Delaney =

Gaelic footballer (died 2020)

Personal information
- Died: 14 April 2020

Sport
Clubs
- Years: Club
- Stadbally (football); Ratheniska (hurling)
Inter-county
- Years: County
- c. 1960s: Laois

Danny Delaney (died 14 April 2020) was a Gaelic footballer and administrator. He played for Laois and Stradbally during the 1950s, 1960s and 1970s.

He was from Cork Road in Stradbally. With Stradbally, Delaney won both the 1959 and 1963 Laois Intermediate Football Championships. He also played hurling for the Ratheniska team. In 1973, Delaney was elected vice-chairman of the county board under Sean Ramsbottom. Delaney also served as chairman of the Stradbally club.

He died at the Maryborough Centre in Portlaoise of COVID-19 on the morning of 14 April 2020. He had been there for around three weeks, having spent months in the Midland Regional Hospital, Portlaoise. Delaney was one of nine deaths at the Maryborough Centre over the Easter weekend, reducing the number of residents there by one third. He was buried at Oughaval Cemetery.

His widow later spoke on national television (Prime Time) of his final months. She told how Delaney had diabetes, kidney failure and "acute syndrome of the heart", and that he had taken a "massive turn" at Christmas which led to brain damage. Then, in the final two weeks, COVID-19 emerged.
