= Delaney Creek =

Stream in Washington County, Indiana, U.S.

Coordinates: 38°45′40″N 86°02′27″W

Delaney Creek is a stream in Washington County, in the U.S. state of Indiana.

Delaney Creek was named for a Native American (Indian) named Delaney who settled there.

== See also ==
- List of rivers of Indiana
