= Dulany =

Dulany is a surname. Notable people with the surname include:

- Caitlin Dulany, American actress
- Daniel Dulany the Elder (1685–1753), American lawyer and land-developer
- Daniel Dulany the Younger (1722–1797), American Loyalist politician and lawyer
- Peggy Dulany (born 1947), American philanthropist
- Richard Henry Dulany (1820-1906), American equestrian
- Walter Dulany (d. 1773), American politician
- Walter Dulany Addison (1769–1848), American Episcopal clergyman
