= Pat Delaney =

Pat or Patrick Delaney may refer to:

- Pat Delaney (actor), actress in Cos
- Pat Delaney (footballer) (born 1940), Scottish footballer
- Pat Delaney (Kilkenny hurler) (1942–2013), Irish hurler
- Pat Delaney (Offaly hurler) (born 1954), Irish hurler
- Pat Delany (born 1969), American politician

== See also ==
- Patrick Delany (disambiguation)
