= Daniel Delaney =

American restaurateur (born 1986)

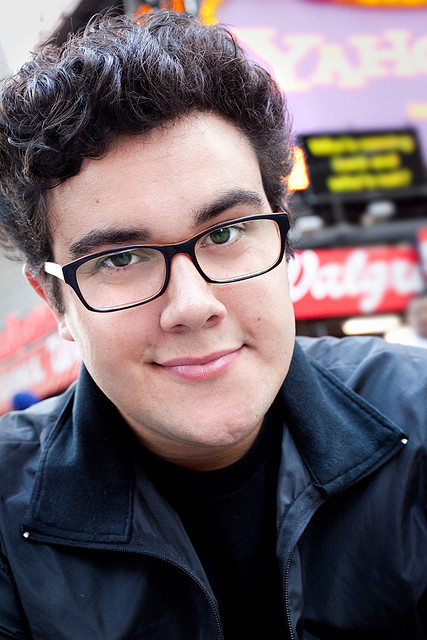
- Born: 1986 (age 39–40)
- Education: University of the Arts
- Known for: Food
- Notable work: VendrTV
- Website: danieldelaney.com

Daniel Delaney is a James Beard Award nominated American restaurateur and former host of VendrTV a video podcast about street food.

== Personal life ==
Delaney graduated from Philadelphia's University of the Arts in May 2008, receiving a BFA in multimedia.

== VendrTV ==
VendrTV
- Genre: food, travel

Cast and voices
- Hosted by: Daniel Delaney

Technical specifications
- Picture format: .flv, .mov, .mp4

Publication
- Original release: February 15, 2009
- Updates: Wednesdays

Related
- Website: vendr.tv

On February 15, 2009, Delaney launched a web video series titled 'VendrTV'. The program consists of tightly edited three-to-five-minute episodes which individually highlight a street vendor from different US cities. The show is shot in high definition in a Food Network-style of videography. Delaney and VendrTV were featured on the October 22, 2009 edition of The CBS Evening News with Katie Couric, as well as in the Los Angeles Times, and USA Weekend.

The show occasionally features celebrity guests, including Jake and Amir of CollegeHumor, and Gary Vaynerchuk.

The intro sequence was made by Eden Soto, responsible for most of Revision3's motion graphics.

== Brisketlab and Delaney Barbecue ==
In April 2012, Delaney launched Brisketlab, a barbecue recipe development series in New York City. Using email marketing and social media, Delaney was able to pre-sell 3,200 lbs of brisket in 48 hours at $25 per lb via online sales. The pre-ordered meat became redeemable at his Brisketlab series which launched in May 2012, and took place in locations like rooftops and cemeteries.

Following much interest from Brisketlab, Delaney announced that he would transition the concept to a restaurant called BrisketTown. The restaurant opened on November 15, 2012 in Williamsburg, Brooklyn, and has received much acclaim, including Best Breakfast in NYC from New York magazine and a Time Out New York Food & Drink Award.

On April 19, 2012, Delaney opened SmokeLine, his second location, in The High Line park in Chelsea.

On June 18, 2013, Zagat announced that Delaney would join their 2013 30 under 30 list.
