= Bracalba, Queensland =

Bracalba Queensland
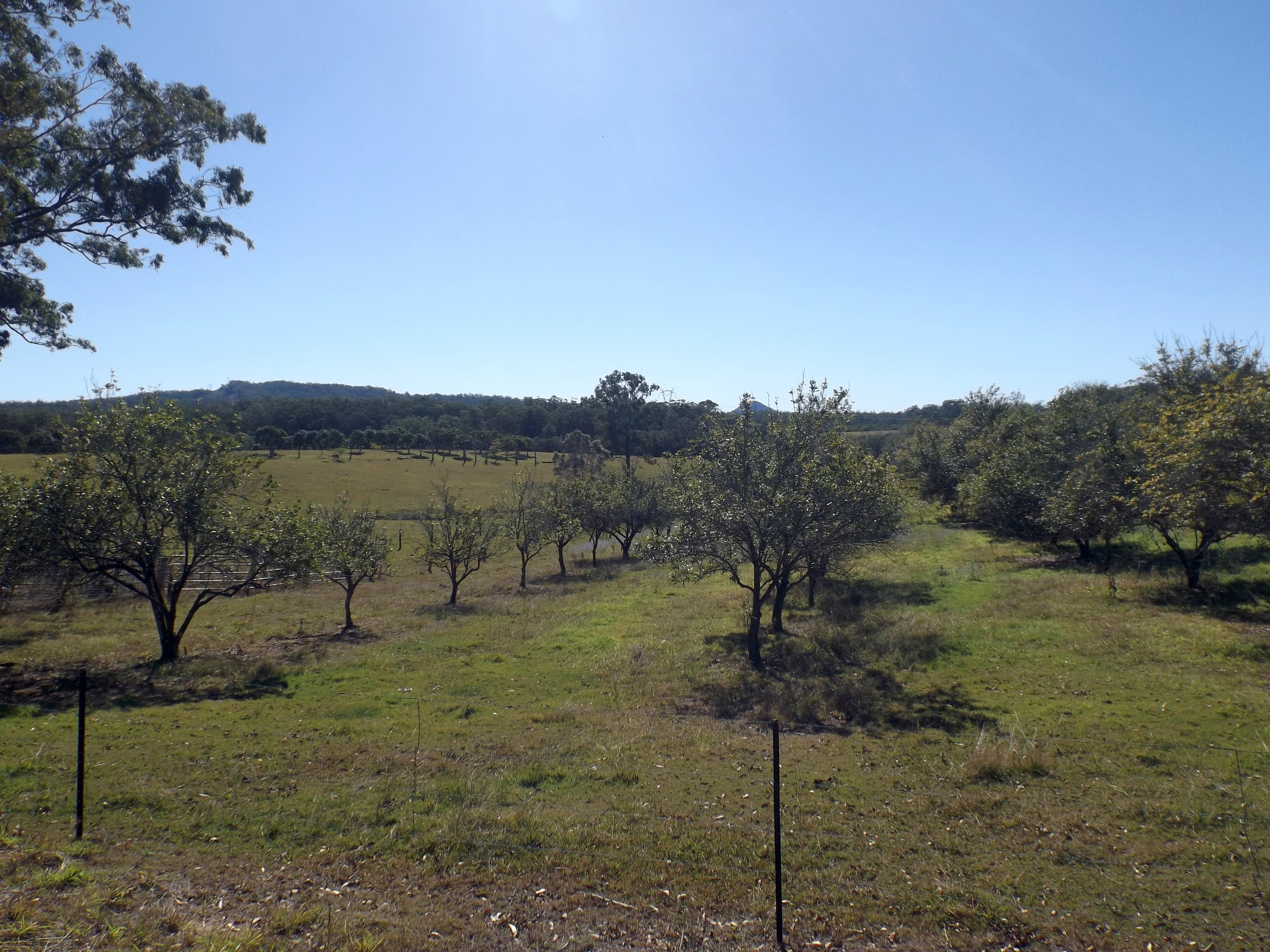
- Orchard, Gamgee Road, 2015

- Coordinates: 27.0063°S 152.8336°E
- Population: 97 (2021 census)
  - Density: 3.992/km^{2} (10.34/sq mi)
- Postcode(s): 4512
- Area: 24.3 km^{2} (9.4 sq mi)
- Time zone: AEST (UTC+10:00)
- Location: 15.1 km (9 mi) NW of Caboolture; 63.3 km (39 mi) NNW of Brisbane CBD
- LGA(s): City of Moreton Bay
- State electorate(s): Glass House
- Federal division(s): Longman
Suburbs around Bracalba:
| D'Aguilar | Woodford | Wamuran |
| D'Aguilar; Delaneys Creek | Bracalba | Wamuran |
| Delaneys Creek | Wamuran Basin | Wamuran |

Bracalba is a rural locality in the City of Moreton Bay, Queensland, Australia. In the 2021 census, Bracalba had a population of 97 people.

== Geography ==
A large portion of the northern half of Bracalba lies within Beerburrum West State Forest.

== History ==
The name is derived from the Wakawaka language, and refers to the scrub areas of the D'Aguilar Range.

Ferndale Provisional School opened on 19 April 1892. On 1 January 1909 it became Ferndale State School. In 1913 it was renamed Bracalba State School. It closed in 1941. Its approximate location was 9-13 Busse Road (27.01151°S 152.84080°E).

== Demographics ==
In the 2011 census, the suburb recorded a population of 162 persons, with a median age of 32 years.

In the 2016 census, Bracalba had a population of 111 people.

In the 2021 census, Bracalba had a population of 97 people.

== Education ==
There are no schools in Bracalba. The nearest government primary schools are Wamuran State School in neighbouring Wamuran to the south-east, Delaneys Creek State School in neighbouring Delaneys Creek to the west, and Woodford State School in Woodford to the north-west. The nearest government secondary schools are Woodford State School (to Year 10) and Tullawong State High School (to Year 12) in Caboolture to the south-east.
