= Delaneys Creek, Queensland =

Delaneys Creek
- Suburb
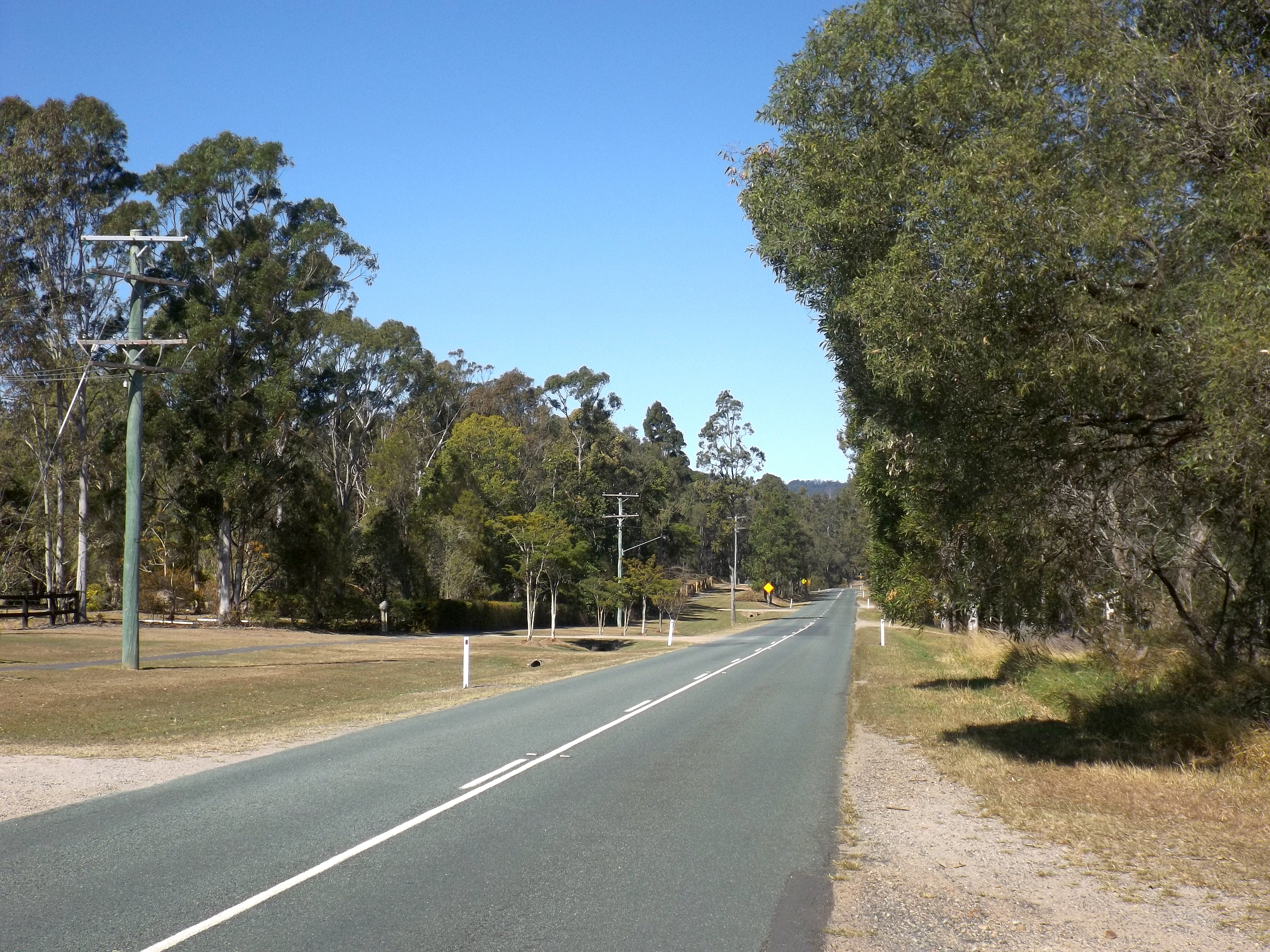
- Mount Mee Road, 2015

- Interactive map of Delaneys Creek
- Coordinates: 27.0105°S 152.7761°E
- Country: Australia
- State: Queensland
- LGA: City of Moreton Bay
- Location: 8.3 km (5.2 mi) S of Woodford; 25.9 km (16.1 mi) NW of Caboolture; 30.9 km (19.2 mi) SE of Kilcoy; 70.3 km (43.7 mi) NNW of Brisbane CBD

Government
  - State electorate: Glass House
  - Federal division: Fisher

Area
  - Total: 39.9 km^{2} (15.4 sq mi)

Population
  - Total: 1,366 (2021 census)
  - Density: 34.24/km^{2} (88.67/sq mi)
- Time zone: UTC+10:00 (AEST)
- Postcode: 4514
Suburbs around Delaneys Creek
Neurum	Woodford; D'Aguilar	Bracalba
Mount Delaney	Delaneys Creek	Bracalba
Mount Delaney	Mount Mee	Wamuran Basin

Delaneys Creek is a rural locality in the City of Moreton Bay, Queensland, Australia. In the 2021 census, Delaneys Creek had a population of 1,366 people.

== Geography ==
Delaneys Creek State Forest occupies the south east corner of the locality. Delaneys Creek and Monkeybong Creek both flow northwestwards into the Stanley River.

Brisbane–Woodford Road (Mount Mee Road) runs through from south to north.

== History ==
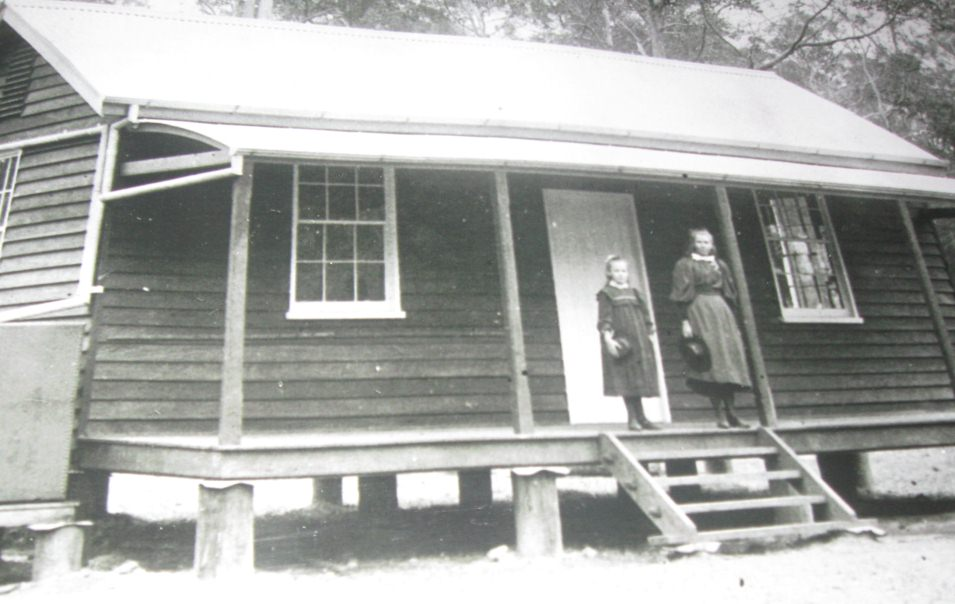
Delaneys Creek State School, circa 1896

The locality takes its name from the creek of the same name, which was named after Joseph Delaney, who was either an early selector or fossicker.

Delaneys Creek Provisional School opened on 5 September 1892 under teacher Miss Franz. In 1909, it became Delaneys Creek State School.

== Demographics ==
In the 2011 census, Delaneys Creek recorded a population of 713 people, 50.4% female and 49.6% male. The median age of the Delaneys Creek population was 37 years, the same as the national median. 81.8% of people living in Delaneys Creek were born in Australia. The other top responses for country of birth were England 4.2%, New Zealand 2.4%, South Africa 1.5%, Germany 1.3%, Spain 0.6%. 90.2% of people spoke only English at home; the next most common languages were 1.4% Afrikaans, 1% German, 0.6% Dutch, 0.6% Japanese, 0.6% Danish.

In the 2016 census, Delaneys Creek had a population of 1,061 people.

In the 2021 census, Delaneys Creek had a population of 1,366 people.

== Education ==
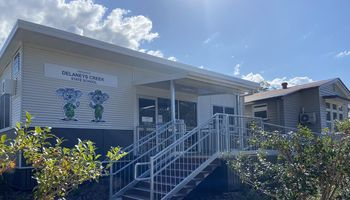
Delaneys Creek State School, 2024

Delaneys Creek State School is a government primary (Prep-6) school for boys and girls at Mount Mee Road (26.9990°S 152.7954°E). In 2018, the school had an enrolment of 155 students with 14 teachers (8 full-time equivalent) and 11 non-teaching staff (6 full-time equivalent).

There is no secondary school in Delaneys Creek. The nearest government secondary school is Woodfood State School (to Year 10) in neighbouring Woodford to the north. For secondary schooling to Year 12, the nearest government schools are Tullawong State High School in Caboolture to the south-east and Kilcoy State High School in Kilcoy to the north-west.
