= Paul Delaney (rugby league) =

English rugby league footballer

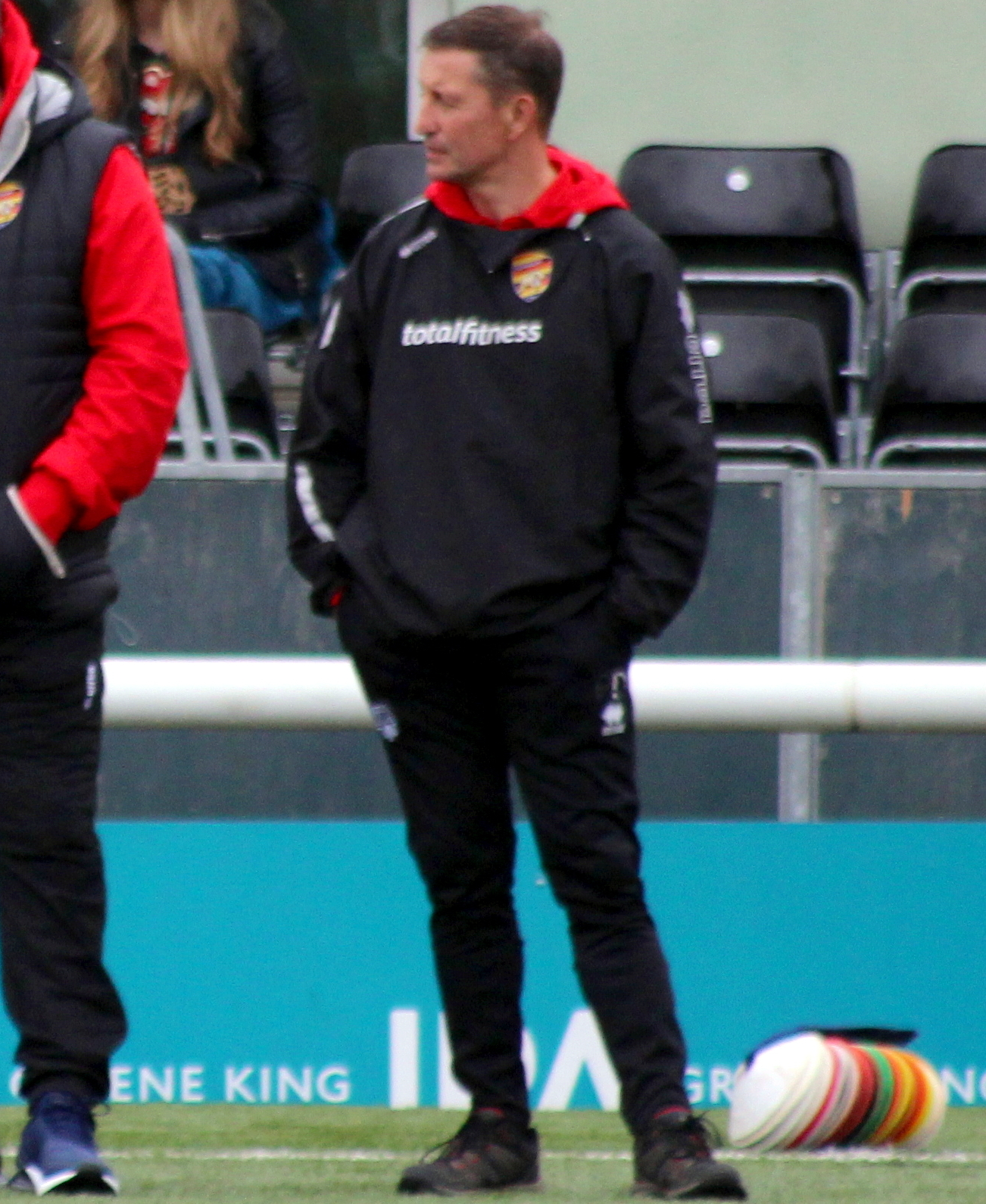

Personal information
- Full name: Paul Delaney
- Born: 18 October 1968 (age 57) Paddington, London, England

Playing information
- Height: 5 ft 8 in (1.73 m)
- Weight: 14 st 13 lb (95 kg)
- Position: Scrum-half
Club
| Years | Team | Pld | T | G | FG | P |
|---|---|---|---|---|---|---|
| 1988–91 | Leeds |
| 1991–00 | Dewsbury |
| | Total | 0 | 0 | 0 | 0 | 0 |
Representative
| Years | Team | Pld | T | G | FG | P |
| 1990 | Great Britain U21 | 2 | 0 | 0 | 0 | 0 |
- Relatives: Jim Delaney (nephew)

Paul Delaney (born 18 October 1968) is a former professional rugby league footballer who played as a scrum-half in the 1980s and 1990s for Leeds and Dewsbury.

Delaney’s son Brad Delaney, and nephew Jim Delaney both play for the Dewsbury Rams in the Kingstone Press Championship.
