= Mark Delaney (boxer) =

English boxer

Personal information
- Nickname: Del
- Nationality: London, England
- Born: Mark Delaney; 1 December 1971 (age 54) Bromley-by-Bow
- Height: 5 ft 11 in (1.80 m)
- Weight: Super Middleweight

Boxing career
- Reach: 185 cm (73 in)
- Stance: Orthodox

Boxing record
- Total fights: 29
- Wins: 26
- Win by KO: 18
- Losses: 3
- Draws: 0
- No contests: 0

Mark Delaney is an English boxer who fought professionally between 1993 and 2000. He is the younger brother of former Commonwealth Cruiserweight Champion Garry "The Hammer" Delaney.

He was born in Bromley-by-Bow on 1 December 1971 and boxed as a schoolboy and amateur before his first professional fight against Lee Sara in October 1993. He rose steadily through the British rankings until in April 1996 he eventually earned a British Super middleweight title fight against Joe Calzaghe. The referee stopped the fight in Round 5 with the Welshman comfortably on top, but Calzaghe has acknowledged that the fight, fought in front of a ferociously partisan crowd in Brentwood, Essex, near to Delaney's native East End, hardened him as a professional. Delaney fought on for another four years, and at one stage was in line for another shot at the British title against Henry Wharton, but the fight never materialized. His final fight was a British Light Heavyweight Title challenge against Neil Simpson, in which Delaney was caught cold and stopped in the first round. He was hit with a decent headshot by Simpson and went down from a couple of shots to the body. He rose but still looked shaky and the referee stepped in shortly afterwards with Delaney taking punishment on the ropes.
