= John C. Delaney =

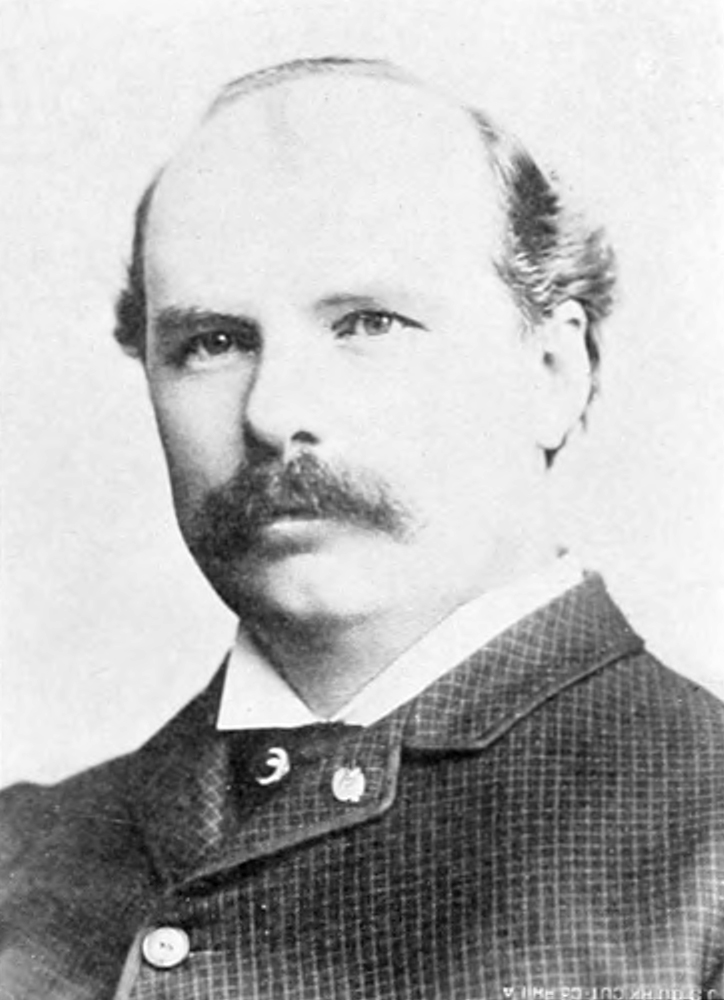
- Born: April 22, 1848; County Galway, Ireland
- Died: April 4, 1915 (aged 66); Washington, D.C., US
- Burial place: Arlington National Cemetery
- Military career
- Allegiance: United States of America
- Branch: United States Army; Union Army
- Service years: 1862–1865
- Rank: 2nd Lieutenant
- Unit: 107th Pennsylvania Volunteer Infantry Regiment - Company I
- Conflicts: Battle of Hatcher's Run
- Awards: Medal of Honor

John Carroll Delaney (April 22, 1848 – April 4, 1915) was a soldier who fought in the American Civil War. Delaney received the United States' highest award for bravery during combat, the Medal of Honor, for his actions during the Battle of Hatcher's Run in Virginia on 6 February 1865. He was honored with the award on 29 August 1894.

== Biography ==
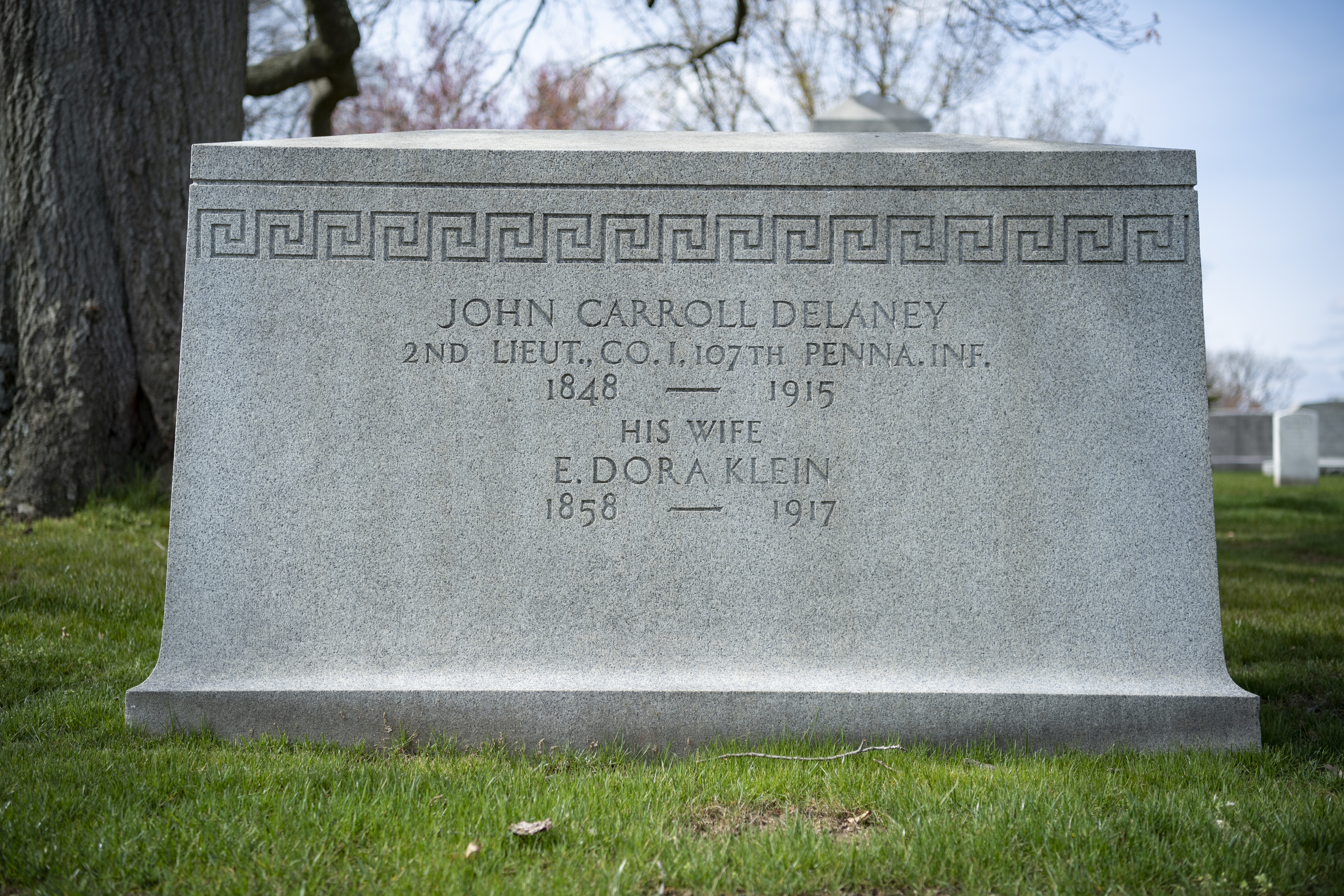
Grave at Arlington National Cemetery

Delaney was born in County Galway, Ireland, on 22 April 1848. He joined the Army in March 1862. He was commissioned as a 2nd Lieutenant in May 1865, and mustered out with his regiment in July. Delaney died on 4 April 1915 and his remains are interred at Arlington National Cemetery.

== Medal of Honor citation ==
Sprang between the lines and brought out a wounded comrade about to be burned in the brush.

== See also ==
- List of American Civil War Medal of Honor recipients: A–F
