= Martin Delaney (activist) =

Martin "Marty" Delaney (December 9, 1945 – January 23, 2009) was an advocate for HIV/AIDS treatments. In 1985, he founded Project Inform, an education and public policy advocacy group concerned with HIV and AIDS, and continued to lead the organization until 2008. Delaney's efforts to streamline the US Food and Drug Administration's drug approval process have been credited with saving thousands of people from early AIDS deaths.

== Founder of Project Inform ==
Delaney, who was himself not HIV-positive, started Project Inform in 1985, as public awareness of AIDS was growing but before any treatments had been approved. Through Project Inform, Delaney brought HIV- and AIDS-related issues to the attention of public policy makers and the public, lobbied for an aggressive program of scientific and medical research, and encouraged regulatory agencies to speed the approval of new medications.

=== Approval of anti-HIV drugs ===
Delaney encouraged the FDA to use a fast-track review procedure for AIDS drugs, reasoning that dying patients could not afford to wait for the results of meticulous and lengthy research. Delaney saw a divide between the needs of scientists, drug companies, and government agencies on the one hand and patients on the other, with the former insisting on time-consuming drug trials for scientific, litigious and public safety reasons, and the latter demanding a chance to stay alive. Delaney helped to bring about fast-track approval of several HIV drugs, and he encouraged research on many more.

=== Underground drug trials ===
Delaney, through Project Inform, facilitated the unofficial testing of potential AIDS medications in the days before a wide variety of antiviral drugs were available to the public. With a lengthy drug approval process and what activists felt was a plodding pace of regulatory agencies, promising new antiviral agents could take many years to reach market. When drugs were unavailable, or when people did not respond to existing medications, some with AIDS relied on untested substances in attempts to cure or alleviate their symptoms.

In 1989, Project Inform ran an unauthorized trial of a drug known as "Compound Q", made from the extract of a cucumber-like plant grown in southeast Asia. Because FDA-run trials of the compound were thought by Project Inform to be proceeding too slowly, the group organized an unofficial clinical trial. Compound Q was flown in from China by a treatment activist and distributed to volunteers who had not responded well to approved medication. Although initial results were positive, and some patients wished to continue receiving the substance, Project Inform closed the trial after several volunteers died. Delaney cautioned against overly optimistic assessments of the drug.

Delaney's experiences with underground drug trials as well as the dangers involved are chronicled in Jonathan Kwitny's book, "Acceptable Risks: The Explosive Politics of Live vs. Profit in America--How Two Courageous Men Fought the FDA to Save Thousands of AIDS Patients, and Changed the Drug Industry Forever".

== Recognition ==
Shortly before Delaney's death from complications of liver cancer, his achievements were honoured by the US National Institute of Allergy and Infectious Diseases (NIAID). Director of the NIAID Anthony Fauci said, "Millions of people are now receiving life-saving antiretroviral medications from a treatment pipeline that Marty Delaney played a key role in opening and expanding...It is without hyperbole that I call Marty Delaney a public health hero."

Delaney died on January 23, 2009, at his home in San Rafael, California, at the age of 63.
