= Robert Delaney (composer) =

American composer

Robert Mills Delaney, sometimes incorrectly spelled Delany (24 July 1903 – 21 September 1956) was an American composer and teacher. Born in Baltimore, Maryland, Delaney began studying the violin as a child in Hanover, Pennsylvania, with Walter Shultz. His musical education continued at the Combs College of Music, where he studied with Henry Schradieck and William Geiger. In 1921, Delaney began undergraduate studies in music at the University of Southern California, but he left the school in 1922 to accompany his parents, Charles Roderic and Anna Louise (née Ritchie) Delaney, on a trip around the world. After returning from the trip, Delaney resumed his music studies but now in Europe: from 1925–1928, he attended the École Normale de Musique de Paris; the Sorbonne (as an auditor); and the Conservatoire Américain de Fontainebleu, France. While in France, he studied violin with Maurice Reuchsel, Lucien Capet, and Léon Nauwick and composition with Nadia Boulanger, Arthur Honegger, Gustav Holst, Ralph Vaughan Williams, and G. Francesco Malipiero.

When he returned to the United States, Delaney obtained a position as a music instructor at the Santa Barbara Boys School in Carpenteria, CA (1928–1933); he also taught at State Normal College in Santa Barbara, CA, as an instructor of music and director of orchestra (1928–1929). He enjoyed an active career as an educator, later teaching at the Concord Summer School of Music (1931–1935), Francis W. Parker School (Chicago) (1934–1935), and, ultimately, as Assistant Professor of Theory and Composition at Northwestern University (1945–1955).

Delaney was best known for his 1928 choral symphony, John Brown's Song, based on Stephen Vincent Benét's Pulitzer Prize winning poem "John Brown's Body." Delaney’s setting received its first performance at the Eastman School of Music in Rochester, NY, as part of the school’s American Composer’s Concert Series (15 December 1933). That same year, the work was awarded a Pulitzer Traveling Scholarship (N.B. The Pulitzer Traveling Scholarship in Music [1917–1942] predates the Pulitzer Prize for Music, which was instituted in 1943; some sources have imprecisely stated that Delaney’s John Brown’s Song was awarded a Pulitzer Prize.)

Delaney’s oeuvre includes several works for chorus or solo voice; compositions for large instrumental ensembles, including Don Quixote Symphony (1927), two Symphonic Pieces (1935, 1937), and a second Symphony (1942–1944); and a small body of chamber music, including three string quartets. For many of his vocal works, Delaney set texts written by his wife, Ellen Emerson (married 1934–1944), the great-granddaughter of Ralph Waldo Emerson.
