= Paul Delaney (professor) =

Paul Delaney is a university professor emeritus of physics and astronomy at York University in Toronto. He was also the director of the Allan I. Carswell Astronomical Observatory, as well as the Master of Bethune College at York, before he retired at the end of 2021.

Delaney has his master's degree in science. He has taught at York University since 1986. He earned his Bachelor of Science in experimental physics at the Australian National University in Canberra and his master's degree in astronomy at the University of Victoria. Delaney has been the recipient of many faculty of science and engineering awards at York University. One of his classes deals with the possibility of life on Mars. Delaney is also the director of the observatory at the York University, and its outreach program. In the past, he has also worked as a nuclear physicist at the Atomic Energy of Canada, and a support astronomer with the McGraw-Hill Observatory in Tucson, Arizona.

He holds both Australian and Canadian citizenship, and resides in Simcoe County with his wife - whom he met while attending the University of Victoria - and their two sons.
