= Jim Delany =

American college sports administrator

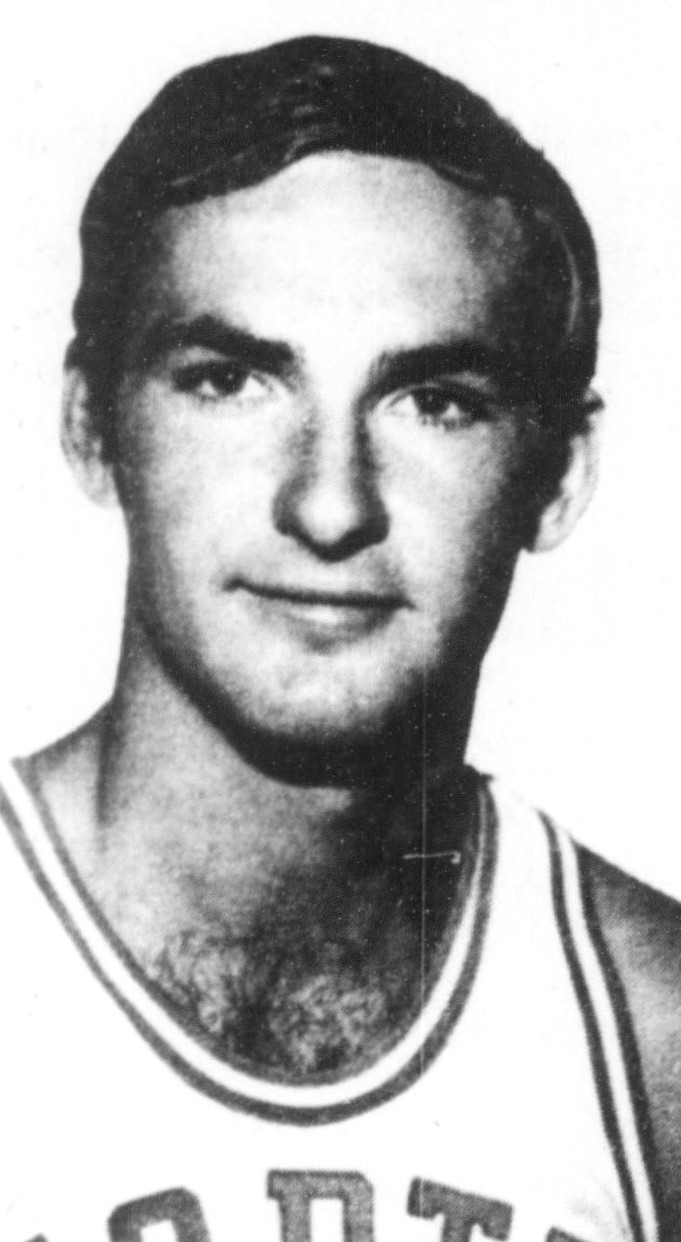
Delany, circa 1969

James Edward Delany (born 1948) is the former commissioner of the Big Ten Conference, a role in which he had served from 1989 until 2020. He is regarded among college athletics as having been influential in the creation of the Bowl Championship Series and its maintenance.

== Early life ==
Delany grew up in South Orange, New Jersey and attended Saint Benedict's Preparatory School in Newark, New Jersey. He attended the University of North Carolina at Chapel Hill, where he received a Bachelor of Arts degree in political science in 1970. While a student there he played for the university's basketball team, playing on two squads that reached the NCAA Final Four. His senior season he was co-captain of the team.

He remained at North Carolina for law school, receiving his Juris Doctor (J.D.) in 1973.

== Professional career ==
From 1973 to 1974, Delany was employed as counsel to the North Carolina Senate Judiciary Committee. From there, he was hired to the position of staff attorney for the North Carolina Justice Department. In 1975 he moved on to a position in the National Collegiate Athletic Association, working as an enforcement representative. He remained in this position for four years before moving on to the Ohio Valley Conference as its commissioner. He remained commissioner of that conference until 1989 when he was appointed commissioner of the Big Ten Conference.

Memberships and other positions held include a member of the Collegiate Commissioners Association (CCA), a member of the College Basketball Partnership, vice president of USA Basketball Executive Committee and a member of the board of directors of the University of North Carolina General Alumni Association.

On March 4, 2019, Delaney announced he was retiring. He officially stepped down on January 1, 2020.

=== Accomplishments as Big Ten Conference commissioner ===
During his tenure as commissioner of the Big Ten Conference, Delany has overseen:

- The creation of the Big Ten Network
- The expansion of the conference to 11 schools with the addition of Penn State University in 1990, and its further expansion to 14 schools with the additions of the University of Nebraska in 2011 and the University of Maryland and Rutgers University in 2014.
- Guaranteed participation for Big Ten schools in seven different bowl games
- Development and implementation of the first college football instant replay system
- An increase in average Big Ten football game attendance from 58,000 per game to 72,000 per game by 2005
- Negotiations with CBS to achieve a US$6 billion 11-year contract for men's basketball NCAA tournament games

=== Influence ===
Due to his position, Delany had a significant amount of influence with regard to the Bowl Championship Series. Twenty-five percent of all U.S. households are in the geographic region covered by the Big Ten Conference. This has had major implications on his influence over college football. Delany opposed the idea of a college football playoff system, arguing that a playoff would diminish the value of regular season games.

== Personal life ==
Delany is married to Catherine Fisher Delany, with whom he has two sons, Newman McMurray and James Chancellor.
