= Robert Delaney (cat burglar) =

British burglar

Robert Augustus Delaney (died 1948) was a British cat burglar, who indeed is credited as being the first such thief. His two main tools were a length of black silk rope, and a long, slender tool which could undo latches. Dressed in formal evening wear, he would use the rope to scale wealthy homes, and then enter the windows with the slender tool. In 1924, Scotland Yard finally succeeded in apprehending him, and he spent four years in jail, after which he was arrested and convicted multiple times. He died on 14 December 1948 in Parkhurst Prison.
