= John Delaney (businessman) =

Irish businessman (1969–2011)

- Born: 1969; Ireland
- Died: 21 May 2011 (aged 42); Mount Everest
- Occupation: Businessman

John Delaney (1969 – 21 May 2011) was an Irish businessman and the CEO of the trading exchange website Intrade from 2003 until 2011, which was the first commercial online exchange to feature trading on election outcomes.

Delaney died at the age of 42 while climbing Mount Everest—a lifelong ambition—and came within 50 meters of the summit. He is survived by his wife, Orla, two sons, Caspar and Alexander, and a daughter, Hope, who was born whilst Delaney was away on the expedition.

== See also ==
- List of people who died climbing Mount Everest
