= Dulaney =

Dulaney may refer to:

- Dulaney, Kentucky, an unincorporated community in Caldwell County
- Mike Faulkerson Dulaney, an American football fullback
- Dulaney High School, a high school in Timonium, Maryland
