= William Delaney =

Australian cricketer

Personal information
- Born: 17 January 1866; Adelaide, Australia
- Died: 16 December 1921 (aged 55); Adelaide, Australia
- Source: Cricinfo, 24 July 2018

William Delaney (17 January 1866 – 16 December 1921) was an Australian cricketer. He played six first-class matches for South Australia between 1888 and 1893.

== See also ==
- List of South Australian representative cricketers
