= Mount Delaney =

Mount Delaney Queensland
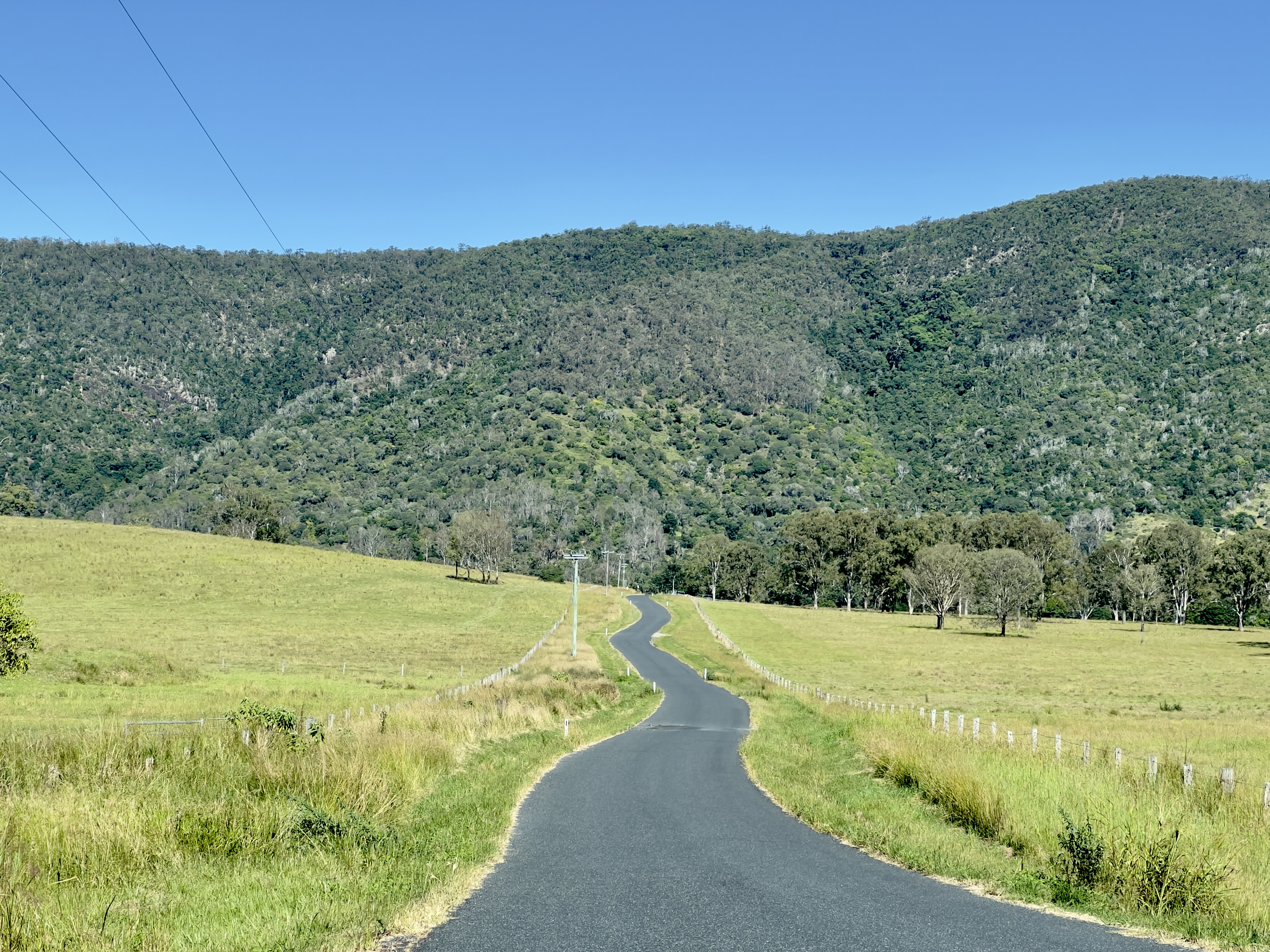
- Mount Delaney, Queensland, 2023

- Coordinates: 27.0138°S 152.7163°E
- Population: 80 (2021 census)
  - Density: 5.4/km^{2} (13.9/sq mi)
- Postcode(s): 4514
- Area: 14.9 km^{2} (5.8 sq mi)
- Time zone: AEST (UTC+10:00)
- Location: 12.6 km (8 mi) SW of Woodford; 22.3 km (14 mi) ESE of Kilcoy; 33.8 km (21 mi) WNW of Caboolture; 85.0 km (53 mi) NNW of Brisbane CBD
- LGA(s): City of Moreton Bay
- State electorate(s): Glass House
- Federal division(s): Longman
Suburbs around Mount Delaney:
Neurum	Neurum	Delaneys Creek
Mount Archer	Mount Delaney	Delaneys Creek
Mount Archer	Mount Mee	Mount Mee

Mount Delaney is a rural locality in the City of Moreton Bay, Queensland, Australia. In the 2021 census, Mount Delaney had a population of 80 people.

== Geography ==
Mount Delaney is a mountain (27.0108°S 152.7044°E) 377 metres (1,237 ft) above sea level.

The west of the locality of Mount Delaney rises in elevation along the D'Aguilar Range. In this area is a section of the D'Aguilar National Park, Mount Mee State Forest and the summit of Mount Delaney. Delaneys Creek winds across the locality from east to west towards Nuerum Creek and feeding into the Stanley River catchment and Somerset Dam. Nuerum Creeks forms part of the western boundary.

== History ==
The mountain and the locality which takes its name were named after a pioneer called Delaney, either a selector or a gold prospector.

Mount Delaney State School opened on 1 June 1933 and closed on 7 August 1936.

== Demographics ==
In the 2011 census, Mount Delaney had a population of 59 people.

In the 2016 census, Mount Delaney had a population of 85 people.

In the 2021 census, Mount Delaney had a population of 80 people.

== Education ==
There are no schools in Mount Delaney. The nearest government primary schools are Delaneys Creek State School in neighbouring Delaneys Creek to the east, Mount Mee State School in neighbouring Mount Mee to the south-east, and Woodford State School in Woodford to the north-east. The nearest government secondary schools are Woodford State School (to Year 10) in Woodford and Kilcoy State High School (to Year 12) in Kilcoy to the north-west.
