= Cameron Delaney (footballer) =

Australian rules footballer (born 1992)

Personal information
- Full name: Cameron Delaney
- Born: 19 June 1992 (age 34)
- Original teams: Grovedale (GFL); Geelong Falcons (TAC Cup)
- Draft: No. 69, 2010 National Draft, North Melbourne
- Height: 194 cm (6 ft 4 in)
- Weight: 86 kg (190 lb)
- Position: Defender

Playing career^{1}
Years	Club	Games (Goals)
2012–2014	North Melbourne	6 (0)
2015–2016	Geelong	0 (0)
- ^{1} Playing statistics correct to the end of 2016.

Cameron Delaney is a former professional Australian rules footballer who played for the North Melbourne Football Club in the Australian Football League, he was also listed with the Geelong Football Club without playing a senior match.

Delaney was recruited by the club in the 2010 National Draft in with pick number 69. North Melbourne was not only the club that Delaney supported growing up, but also the club at which his brother, Luke, played for at the time. He made his debut in Round 2, 2012, against Greater Western Sydney.

Delaney was delisted at the conclusion of the 2014 AFL season but told that he would be re-drafted via the rookie draft in the 2014 AFL draft. However, he was selected in that draft by Geelong at pick 31, one pick before the selection with which North Melbourne had committed to re-draft him. At the conclusion of the 2016 season, he was delisted without playing a senior match for Geelong.

== Statistics ==
Legend
G	Goals	K	Kicks	D	Disposals	T	Tackles
B	Behinds	H	Handballs	M	Marks

Season	Team	No.	Games	Totals							Averages (per game)						
Season	Team	No.	Games	G	B	K	H	D	M	T	G	B	K	H	D	M	T
2011	North Melbourne	31	0	—	—	—	—	—	—	—	—	—	—	—	—	—	—
2012	North Melbourne	31	5	0	1	40	31	71	16	12	0.0	0.2	8.0	6.2	14.2	3.2	2.4
2013	North Melbourne	31	1	0	0	15	4	19	12	1	0.0	0.0	15.0	4.0	19.0	12.0	1.0
2014	North Melbourne	31	0	—	—	—	—	—	—	—	—	—	—	—	—	—	—
2015	Geelong	45	0	—	—	—	—	—	—	—	—	—	—	—	—	—	—
2016	Geelong	45	0	—	—	—	—	—	—	—	—	—	—	—	—	—	—
Career			6	0	1	55	35	90	28	13	0.0	0.2	9.2	5.8	15.0	4.7	2.2
