= John DeLany (Wisconsin lawyer) =

American politician

John DeLany (often spelled Delany or Delaney, or De Lany; 1824 – October 29, 1882) was a lawyer and journalist from Portage County who served a single one-year term in the Wisconsin State Assembly representing Portage County as a Democrat.

== Background ==
DeLany was born in New York City in 1824. An account of his newspaper career states that he served an apprenticeship at the Green Bay Intelligencer, setting his first type in 1834. In 1842, he and a partner issued the third newspaper in the Madison region, the weekly Wisconsin Democrat, on October 18, 1842. It was radically pro-Democratic Party and states' rights. The paper transferred to other hands on February 9, 1843. DeLany next appears in Wisconsin Territory as a young retail clerk in what was then called the "Fort Winnebago settlement" or "Winnebago settlement", now Portage, Wisconsin, reading the law between customers. Around 1845, John was reading law in Mineral Point, and became involved as spotter and getaway driver for a buggy from which future Wisconsin Supreme Court justice Samuel Crawford shot a disgruntled client with whom his firm was feuding.

== Assembly ==
In 1848, DeLany was living and practicing law in Stevens Point when he was elected to the Assembly's Portage County seat for the 1849 session (the 2nd Wisconsin Legislature), replacing fellow Democrat James M. Campbell. At the time of taking office in January 1849, he was described as being from Plover, Wisconsin, a lawyer from New York (state) who was 24 years old and had been in Wisconsin for 14 years. He was defeated in the 1849 election by Walter D. McIndoe, a Whig; he challenged the loss in the Assembly, but McIndoe was eventually seated.

== The law, news and civic life ==
DeLany had but recently moved to back to Columbia County and taken up the practice of law in Fort Winnebago settlement when he and his brother James set up a company, Delaney Brothers, and began to publish the River Times (formally, the Fox and Wisconsin River Times) on July 4, 1850. It was quite partisan, favoring the Democratic Party. The paper did not get another issue out until August 5, but by June 6, 1853, it had reached its 21st issue, which announced the death by drowning of James Delaney. A third Delaney brother joined the paper, and newspaper veteran John A. Brown, known as "General Brown" joined the two surviving Delaney brothers. On September 17, the River Times ceased publication; Brown would resume publication under the name Badger State in October, but the Delaney family was out of the business.

In December 1852 he was admitted to practice before the Supreme Court of the United States. In 1853, he was chosen a vestryman for the newly organized Episcopal Church in Portage. DeLany was the first new initiate in the Masonic Lodge in Portage organized in 1850, and would hold offices such as Secretary and Junior Warden in that body between 1853 and 1857.

== Military service and leaving Wisconsin ==
In 1852 he was the lieutenant colonel of the state militia in Columbia County By 1855, he was judge advocate general for the state. DeLany served as a captain of volunteers in the American Civil War (he fought in the Battle of Shiloh, and was reported missing after the battle). After the war he reportedly "drifted away" to Nebraska, eventually settling in North Platte with a legal practice there, and married a woman from Kentucky. Years later, reports came that he had frozen off both his feet, which turned out to be an exaggeration.

Delaney (known locally as Colonel De Lany or DeLany) was elected a justice of the peace in Lincoln County, Nebraska, in November 1881. He began showing symptoms of mental illness, and was committed to the Nebraska Asylum for the Insane, in which he soon died on October 29, 1882, of what was described as "acute mania". His obituary declared, "He had his faults, but was kind, humane, companionable, and without an enemy."
