= John Delaney (Bahamian lawyer) =

Bahamian lawyer (born 1964)

John Delaney (born 19 April 1964) is a Bahamian lawyer.

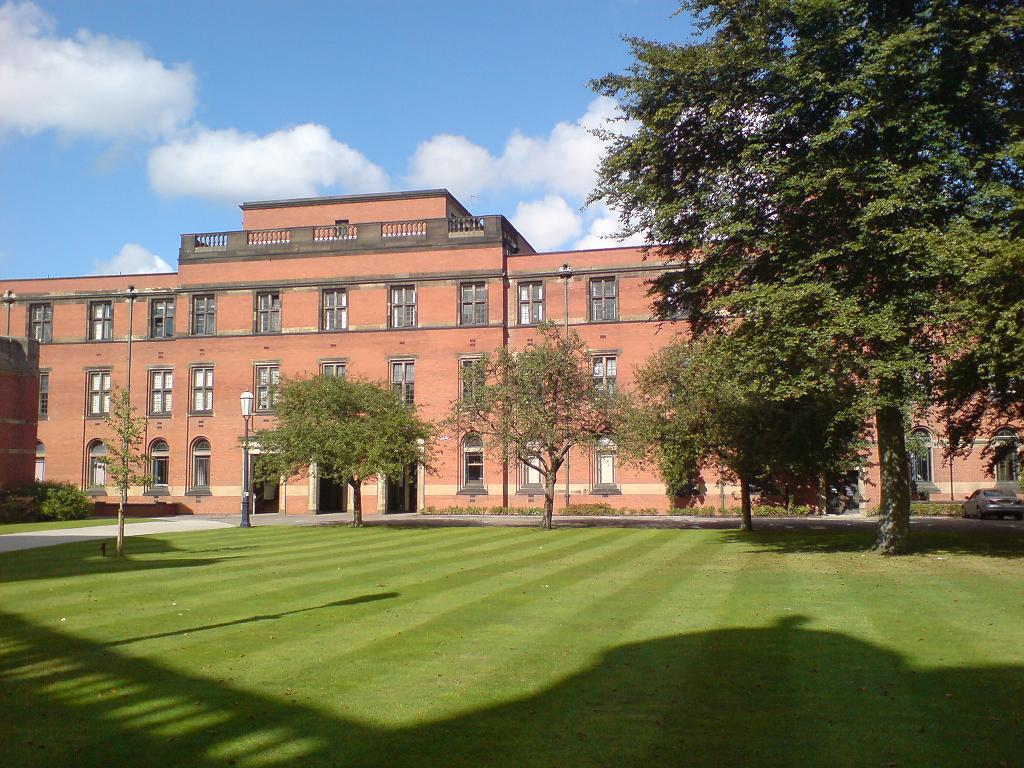
Birmingham University

John Delaney graduated with an LLB in law from Birmingham University in 1986, studied for the Bar at Lincoln's Inn, and graduated with an LLM in law from the London School of Economics in 1988. He was called to the Bahamas Bar in 1987.

Delaney was sworn in as Attorney-General and Minister of Legal Affairs of The Bahamas in 2009. He has already been appointed to the Senator of the Bahamian Parliament by the Governor-General. He held the office of Attorney General until 2012, when he returned to private legal practice.
