= Crohamhurst Observatory =

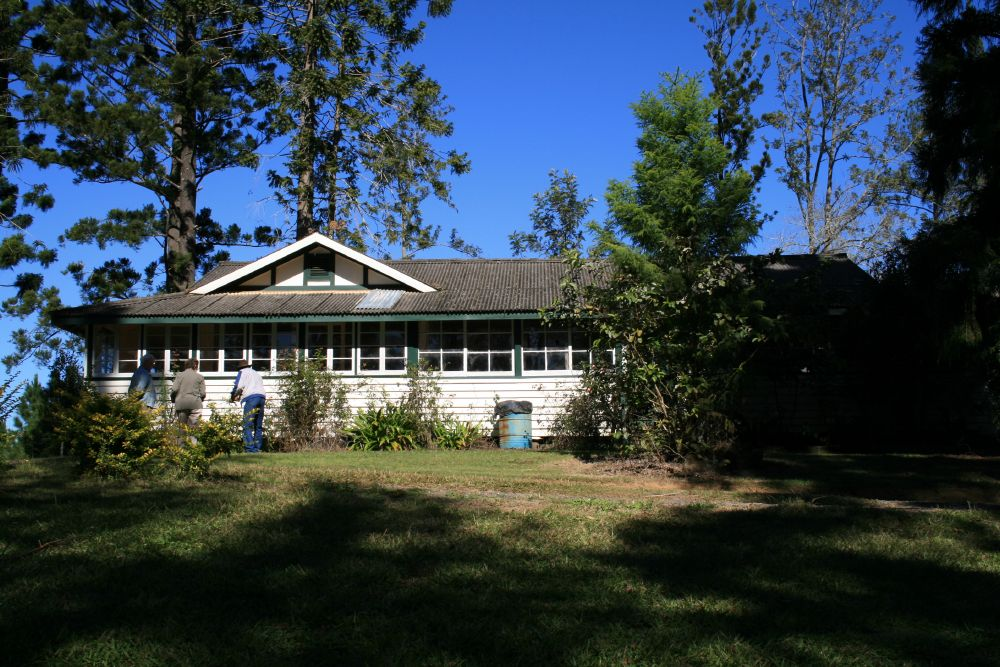
- Former Crohamhurst Observatory, 2007

- Location within Queensland Location within Australia
- 26.8098°S 152.8697°E
- Location: 131 Crohamhurst Road, Crohamhurst, Sunshine Coast Region, Queensland, Australia

History
- Design period: 1919 - 1930s (interwar period)
- Built: 1935

Queensland Heritage Register
- Official name: Crohamhurst Observatory (former), SEQ-1F 4
- Type: state heritage (built)
- Designated: 13 November 2008
- Reference no.: 602682
- Significant period: 1935-1990s

The Crohamhurst Observatory is a heritage-listed observatory at 131 Crohamhurst Road, Crohamhurst, Sunshine Coast Region, Queensland, Australia. It was built in 1935. It was added to the Queensland Heritage Register on 13 November 2008.

== History ==
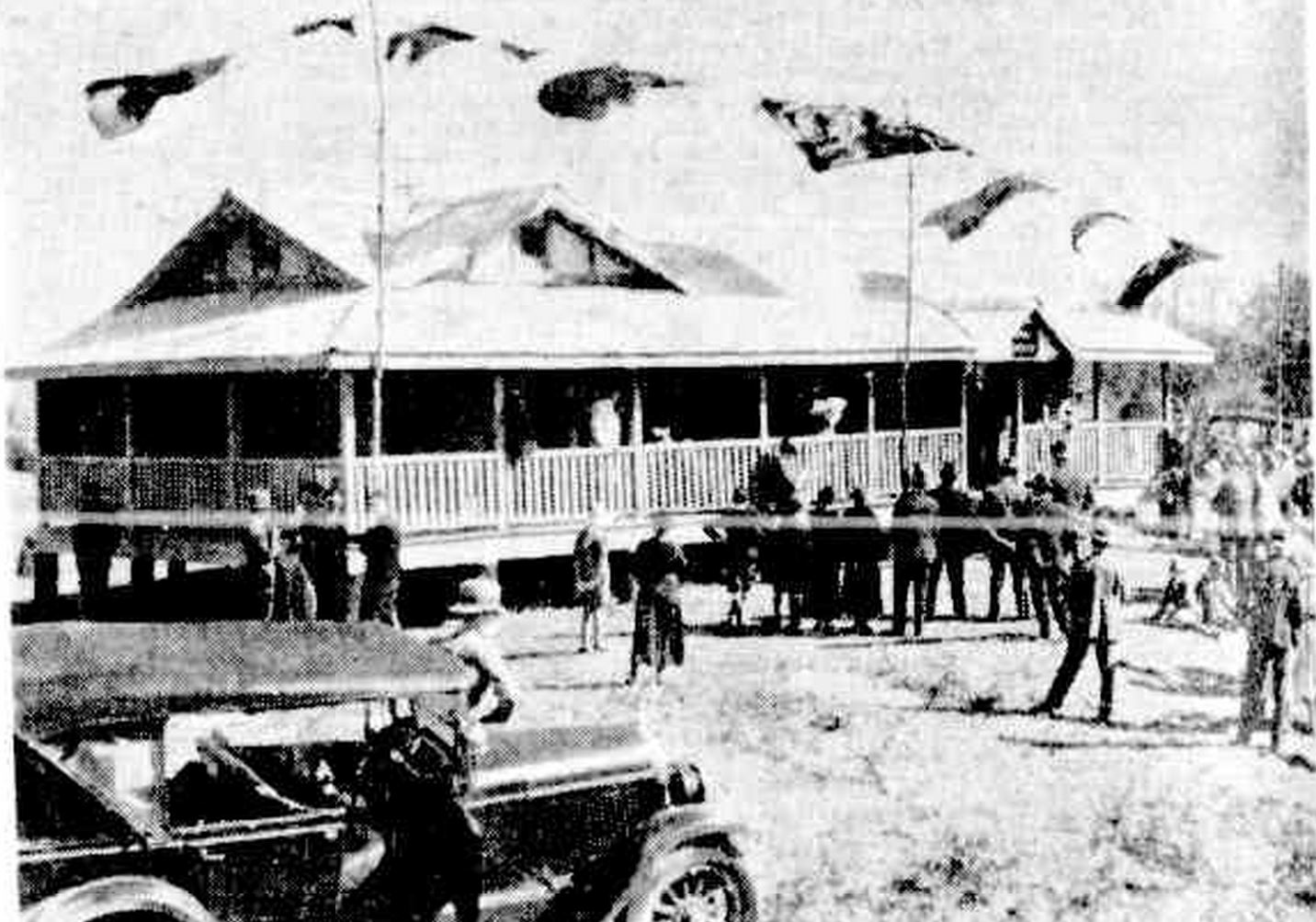
Crohamhurst Observatory on its opening day, 1935

Crohamhurst Observatory was constructed in 1935 on Inigo Owen Jones' property Crohamhurst, near Peachester. It was built for use by Jones as the site of solar and planetary observations and weather measurements used in long-range weather forecasting, and as the headquarters of his forecasting service. As such it is important in demonstrating the role of weather observing and recording in the history of Queensland and is a rare example of land use for long-range weather forecasting purposes. Inigo Jones was a well-known long-range weather forecaster throughout Australia from the 1920s until his death in 1954 and Crohamhurst Observatory has a special association with his life and work.

Meteorological observation and recording by Europeans in Australia commenced with the arrival of the First Fleet and spread across the continent with the tide of settlement. By the end of the 19th century the importance of meteorology was recognised and most colonies had established their own meteorological services, including Queensland from 1887. They prepared daily weather charts, issued forecasts and had begun the development of a climatological data bank. Following Federation, the Commonwealth Government assumed national responsibility for meteorological services when legislation creating the Commonwealth Bureau of Meteorology was passed in 1906. From its inception until the late 1980s the Commonwealth Bureau of Meteorology concentrated upon providing accurate short-term weather forecasts and creating a record of Australian weather observations. Finally in the 1990s, Australian scientists emerged as experts in the preparation of seasonal outlooks for the practical application to agriculture and other sectors.

Interest in predicting long-range weather trends dated from the middle of the 19th century, at the same time that meteorological observation was establishing itself as a scientific pursuit to enable daily weather forecasting. The appearance of spots on the surface of the Sun had been the source of conjecture for a long time. Around the middle of the 19th century it was recognised that the number of sunspots increased and decreased on a regular cycle of around 11 years. The hypothesis was that as sunlight dominates humanity's experience of weather, then the sunspot cycle might set in motion regular changes in the Earth's climate. Consequently, during the late 19th and early 20th centuries, many scientists and enthusiastic amateurs embarked on the hunt for climatic cycles, believing that if such patterns could be found, then it might be possible to forecast the weather months, perhaps years ahead.

In Queensland, German-born MLA Theodore Unmack, who took control of the Postmaster-General's department, including the weather office in 1890, became "convinced of the vast importance of seasonal forecasts" to Queensland. He asked the Queensland Government Meteorologist, Clement Wragge, to investigate and in particular to examine the work of Austrian scientist Eduard Bruckner, who claimed to have discovered a 35-year cycle in the climatic records of Europe. Although initially sceptical, Wragge began to investigate the use of this "Bruckner cycle", combined with the well-known 11 year sunspot cycle, as the basis for long-range weather forecasting.

Other climatic cycle research in the second half of the 19th century related fluctuations in atmospheric pressure with rainfall. These "teleconnections" between weather conditions in different parts of the world such as simultaneous drought in India and Australia, named the Southern Oscillations, were documented and their potential use in seasonal prediction demonstrated. This was later recognised as a climate predicting tool in conjunction with the El Nino (ENSO).

Meanwhile, there was a growing clamour for long-range forecasts in Australia from those dependent upon the land, especially from farmers, which the Commonwealth Bureau of Meteorology did little to fulfil. This appetite was met in part by Inigo Jones who from 1923 until his death in 1954 provided long-range seasonal weather forecasts from Crohamhurst and Brisbane, depending on his residence.

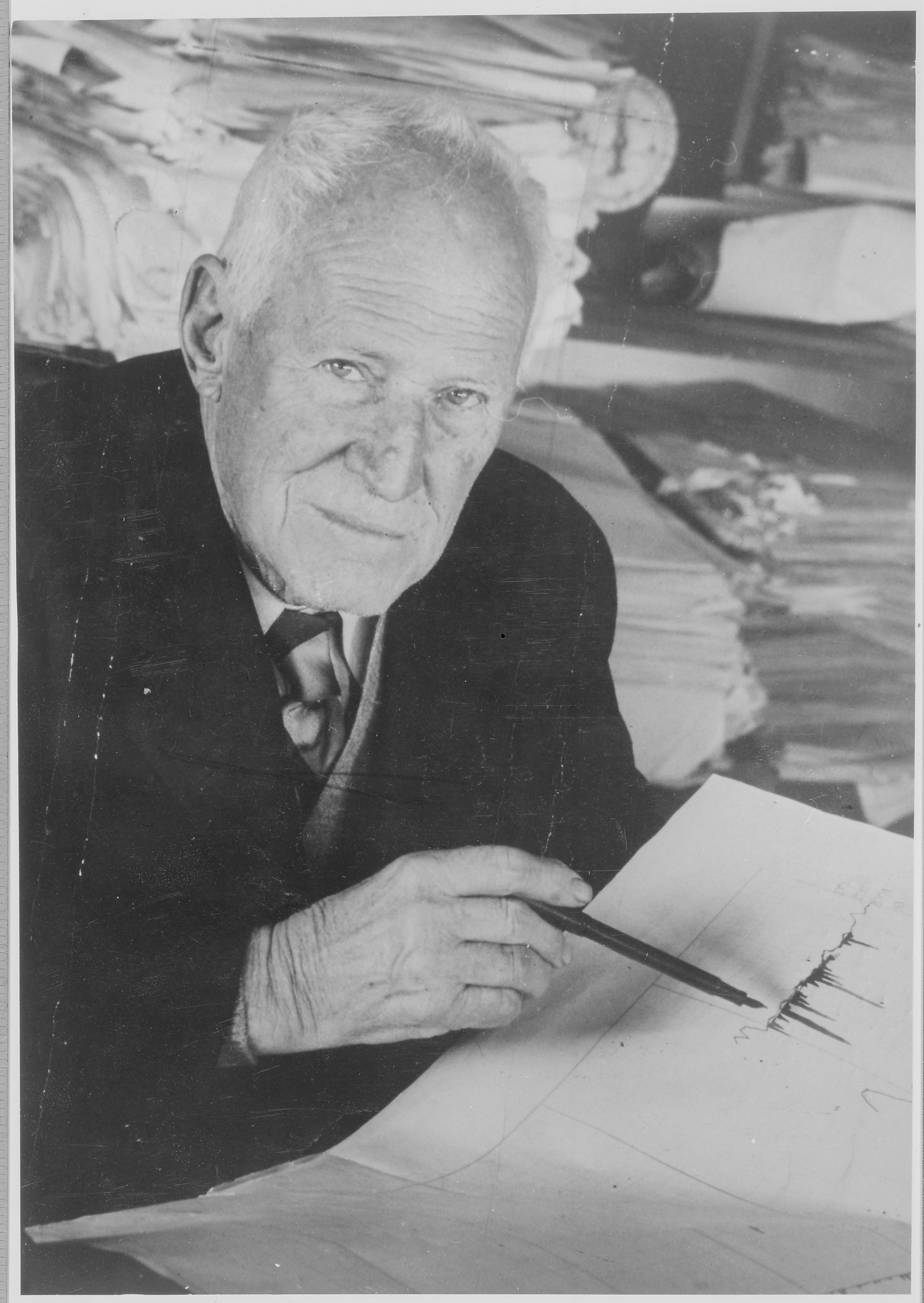
Inigo Owen Jones, circa 1945

Inigo Owen Jones was born in England at Croydon, Surrey in 1872, the son of civil engineer, Owen Jones and his wife, Emilie Susanne, née Bernoulli. Arriving in Brisbane on 4 November 1874 on the ship Darling Downs, Jones resided in Brisbane while his father was employed by the Queensland Government as an engineer designing roads and railways. Later the family resided in Owanyilla near Maryborough, and Gympie. He was educated from age 11 until 1888 at the Brisbane Grammar School and completed the University of Sydney Junior Examination.

In 1888 he left school to take up employment at the Queensland Meteorological Bureau working for Clement Lindley Wragge, who had been appointed Colonial Meteorologist in 1887. At the Queensland Meteorological Bureau, Jones was trained in taking weather readings. He worked there until his family left Brisbane in late 1892 to take up residence on a property near Peachester, that they named Crohamhurst after Lord Goschen's Surrey estate.

Although engaged in agricultural work on his parents' property for the next 35 years, Inigo Jones continued his daily weather recordings. He achieved lasting recognition of his meteorological observations when on 2 February 1893 he recorded the highest daily rainfall in Australia (35.71 inches (907 mm)) at Crohamhurst.

Motivated by his understanding that farmers and pastoralists needed reliable long-range weather predictions, Inigo Jones pursued the previous work on long-range weather forecasting undertaken by his mentor, Clement Wragge. From 1923 onwards Jones issued the long-range weather forecasts, based on astronomical observations and the repetition of weather cycles, for which he became famous. Through his correspondence with Cyrus Macfarlane the science writer for Brisbane's Daily Mail newspaper, Jones gained his first weather forecast publication. In 1927 Inigo Jones moved to Brisbane where he was paid for articles and forecasts printed in three Brisbane newspapers. He also published articles in the Producer which was issued by the Council of Agriculture, in Country Life from 1931 and in The Land from c. 1936. He resided in Brisbane with his family until Easter 1935.

Recognition and support of Inigo Jones' work came in the late 1920s. In October 1928 the Queensland Government appointed Jones as director of the Bureau of Seasonal Forecasting of the Council of Agriculture. In the same month the Inigo Jones Seasonal Weather Forecasting Trust was formed with contributions from governments and industry, with the Lord Mayor of Brisbane as Chairman. The Trust raised funds to further Jones' research and successfully lobbied the Queensland State Government to provide an annual subsidy. In 1931 a branch was established in Sydney also with its Lord Mayor as chairman. In 1942 the Long-Range Weather Forecasting Trust, a non-profit body, was established by organisations within primary industry and with further financial assistance from the Queensland Government to enable Jones to pursue his research at Crohamhurst until his death in 1954.

Although two Ministerially-commissioned investigations concluded that his forecasting methods had no scientific basis, the demand for his forecasts remained and after his death the service continued.

Jones' long-range forecasts were based on a complicated series of cycles linking planetary movements and sun spots. He saw the whole solar system as simply a vast electromagnetic machine automatically controlled by the magnetic fields of the planets, which applies among other things, to the seasons. Therefore, if it were known what the conditions were when the same planets stood in the same relation in the past, we could know what conditions would arise now and in the future.

Jones' forecasts were widely distributed and acclaimed during the 1920s and 1930s. Tim Sherratt, one of Inigo Jones' biographers regarded Jones as the most celebrated amongst the ranks of Australia's "weather prophets". Another biographer, John Hogan, wrote in 1969 that of all the non-official weather forecasters who had practised in Australia, particularly in the field of long-range forecasting, there was no-one so widely known throughout the whole continent, and with so great a following of supporters, as Inigo Jones, whose forecasts were in great demand. In 1938 the Land newspaper organised a survey of its readers' opinions of Jones' predictive powers and over the following months published extracts from many. Of the 102 letters received from all over rural New South Wales, only three opposed government funding for Inigo Jones and most attested his accuracy. According to the Canberra Times, Inigo Jones was "one of the outstanding figures" of the 1939 Australian and New Zealand Association for the Advancement of Science (ANZAAS) meeting in Canberra. Jones was a determined battler whose "fight for recognition as a long range forecaster" had begun in the early 1920s. Although he had received some support from the Queensland government, the newspaper noted that Commonwealth authorities had been "stubbornly turning deaf ears to his claims".

Newspaper cartoons' such as the Weg's Day cartoon which appeared in the Melbourne Herald Sun on 14 January 1954 lampooning the Commonwealth Meteorological Bureau's forecasting in favour of Inigo Jones' predictions attest to Jones' high profile as a weather forecaster.

Jones won recognition from rural and financial organisations such as the Graziers' Association of NSW, the Queensland Council of Agriculture, CSR Co, and Dalgety and Co, and received much encouragement in his work, as well as aid to finance his observatory so that his work might continue. He held memberships to a number of esteemed overseas organisations. Jones was elected a Fellow of the Astronomical Society in November 1935. He was a Fellow of the Royal Meteorological Society and a member of the Société astronomique de France (Astronomical Society of France), the American Meteorological Society, the Astronomical Society of the Pacific, Australia New Zealand Association for the Advancement of Science and the American Association for the Advancement of Science. Jones also was a member of a variety of Queensland societies that reflected his wide-ranging interests: the Queensland Astronomical Society, Royal Society of Queensland, Historical Society of Queensland and the Town Planning Association of Queensland.

Jones' persistent attempts to have his predictive methods recognised as soundly based, by any substantial body of accredited scientific opinion, failed. A committee of the Commonwealth Bureau of Meteorology reviewed his system in the late 1930s but rejected his ideas. In the early 1950s persistent agitation for official recognition of Jones' forecasting methods led to the Federal Minister for the Interior establishing a committee to conduct a Departmental investigation into Jones' activities and claims. This committee showed that Jones' forecasts had only a 50 per cent chance of being correct. Biographer, Tim Sherratt, believes that even if Jones' predictions were not valid, he was providing farmers with data on average seasonal conditions in a form that they could use and understand. It may have been that not only the content of his forecasts was important, but the way landholders integrated them with their own knowledge of the local environment.

The observatory building at Crohamhurst, which was financed by the Seasonal Weather Forecasting Trust and the Colonial Sugar Refining Co., was opened on 13 August 1935 by the Queensland Governor Sir Leslie Wilson, Inigo Jones' friend and supporter. The Queensland government helped with operating expenses and declared the site a reserve for scientific purposes. Other funding was obtained through money earned from the press and by direct gifts from persons and institutions.

The observatory building was sited on a dome-shaped hill adjoining the road. Jones explained in 1937 that the building was designed to enable maximum comfort under the climatic conditions. The observatory was built of fibro-cement for roof and walls, open to the north and east for light and air passage, and closed to the south and west, where double walls kept out the cold and hot winds. There were verandahs along the east and north elevations. The building consisted of a large computing room and a laboratory and provision was made for additions when required at the south-east corner. Sited near the observatory were Jones' deep earth temperature pits, consisting of drilled holes lined with clay pipes, from which he took temperature readings at varying depths up to 10.67 metres (35.0 ft) below the earth's surface. These observations were designed to ascertain the "solar constant of radiation". Temperature readings were also taken from the nearby Crohamhurst Creek. A Stevenson screen (a vented box) housed instruments such as a thermometer for measuring temperature, barometer for measuring barometric pressure and hygrometer for measuring humidity. Three telescopes were used for solar observation.

The purpose of Crohamhurst Observatory was to take daily observations of the sun and of all weather conditions. These were used to test the possibility of the immediate solar control of the weather; to test the application of these possibilities to the weather of Australia; to issue forecasts to those newspapers and publications that supported the observatory; and to test the hypothesis of seasonal repetitions through cycles.

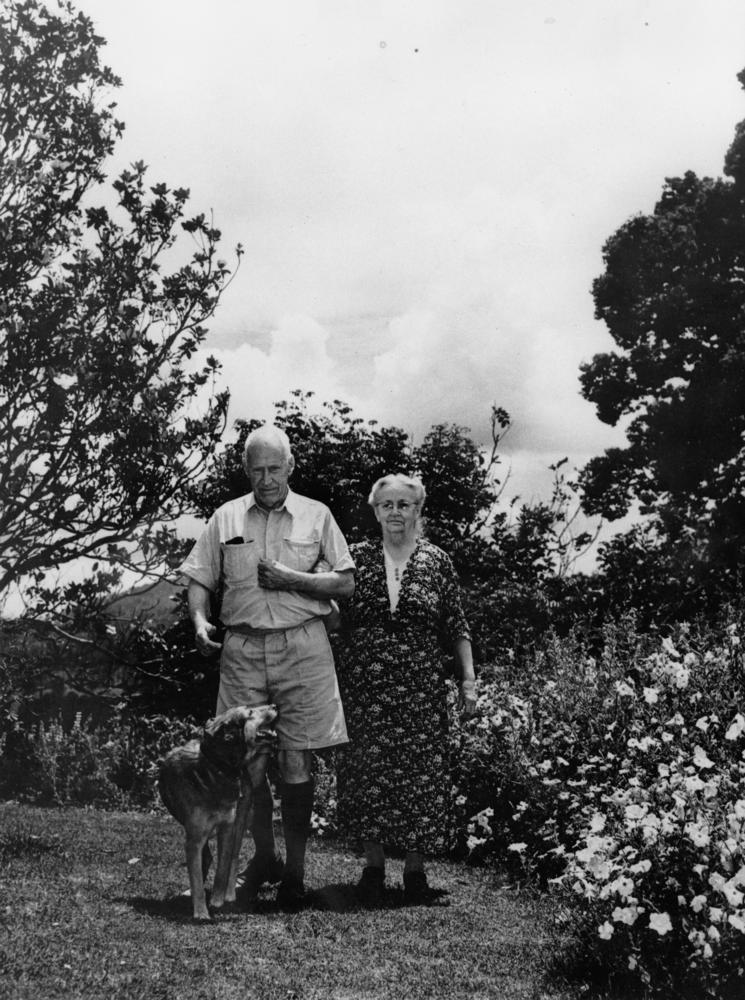
Inigo and Marion Jones in their garden at Crohamhurst, ca 1935

By the mid-1940s Jones, in his seventies, was considering the fate of his property and his life work after his demise. Jones wrote to the Department of Forestry offering land for forestry purposes in December 1946. He had already made experimental tree plantings on his property including a row of hoop pines on the northern boundary, and believed the land best used for that purpose. The offer was later increased to include 100 acres (40 ha) in total. This land was transferred to the government on 14 October 1947. In January 1950 Jones approached the Forestry Department again to offer more land to be held as a reserve for forestry until after the demise of himself and his wife. This land included that upon which Jones' house and garden stood. This offer was accepted and the land was leased by Inigo and his wife Marion.

Following Inigo Jones' death on 14 November 1954 the area was gazetted as Timber Reserve 743 (124 acres (50 ha)) which included the area previously described as part Portion 158. After his wife Marion died on 2 June 1960 the land of Crohamhurst farm, but not the separate Observatory reserve, was returned to the Forestry Department for forestry usage. The whole reserve was named "Crohamhurst Forest".

In his latter years Jones had been concerned about the continuation of his work and keen to train an assistant for this purpose. A house designed by Jones' son-in-law was built in 1951 approximately 40 metres (130 ft) from the Observatory. This was occupied by Jones' assistant, and in 1953 he employed (Robert) Lennox Walker who, following Army service in World War II, had trained and worked as a forester and surveyor in Victoria and Queensland.

Crohamhurst Observatory continued operations after Inigo's death when his work was assumed by Lennox Walker. In August 1993 Walker applied to freehold Special lease 41606 and the area which included the historic Crohamhurst Observatory. This was freeholded when Walker purchased the land and the commercial timber from the Crown. The building subsequently left the ownership of the Walker family and has ceased to be used as a centre for long-range weather forecasting.

Inigo Jones' role in the field of long-range weather forecasting in Queensland continued to be recognised well after his death. On 25 February 1982 the Royal Geographical Society of Australasia unveiled a plaque at Crohamhurst Observatory to commemorate Inigo Jones. This is located on the site of the platform he used for astronomy observations.

Recent changes to Crohamhurst Observatory include an extension to the south-west and enclosing the northern verandah. Equipment and charts used by Jones have been removed in recent years. However, the deep earth temperature pits and the Stevenson screen which sheltered instruments from direct sunlight, wind and rain, remain in situ.

The building is no longer used as an observatory.

== Description ==
Crohamhurst Observatory is sited on the southern side of Crohamhurst Road north of Peachester and adjoins Crohamhurst State Forest. The Observatory is set on the summit of a dome-shaped hill on maintained, open lawn and is surrounded by mature hoop pine trees.

Crohamhurst Observatory comprises a 1935 observatory building and numerous in-ground meteorological devices. A gravel driveway leads from the front gate on Crohamhurst Road to the observatory building.

The observatory building is a single-storey timber-framed structure set on low timber stumps. It is rectangular in plan with verandahs to the north and east which have been enclosed with weatherboard cladding and casement windows. It has a hipped roof with louvred gablets to the north, east and west and a small gable over the entry. The roof is clad in corrugated fibre-cement sheeting and has no eaves gutters. Cladding to all elevations is weatherboard. A shed-like structure has been added to south-west corner of the building.

The internal walls and ceilings of the observatory building are lined with fibre-cement sheeting with timber cover strips. Internal doors are timber joinery and the floor has been lined with linoleum. Some half-height walls and counters open on to the enclosed verandahs.

Several meteorological devices are visible around the site including a Stevenson Screen to the north-east of the observatory building which consists of a small louvred timber enclosure set on a steel frame approximately 1.2 metres (3 ft 11 in) high. To the north of the Stevenson Screen are the remains of other meteorological devices which consist of a concrete strip with various pipes cut off at ground level sunk into it.

To the east of the observatory building are other meteorological devices including deep earth temperature pits formed from clay pipes covered with sheet metal caps which protrude approximately 300 millimetres (12 in) out of the ground. A 1952 memorial plaque to the east of the observatory building marks the site of a telescope which has been removed. Other elements include a concrete sundial stand to the west of the Stevenson Screen.

A grassed pathway leads along the treed fence line to Crohamhurst Creek. A row of mature hoop pines has been planted along the northern fence line. Entry to the site is marked by a miniature Stevenson screen serving as a letterbox.

== Heritage listing ==
The former Crohamhurst Observatory was listed on the Queensland Heritage Register on 13 November 2008 having satisfied the following criteria.

The place is important in demonstrating the evolution or pattern of Queensland's history.

The Crohamhurst Observatory with its observatory building and surviving meteorological equipment dating from the 1930s is important in demonstrating the evolution of weather forecasting and recording in Queensland. It is the site of nationally-recognised long-range weather forecasting undertaken for dissemination throughout Australia and provides important early evidence of the techniques used.

The establishment and funding of the Crohamhurst Observatory with support from businesses, government departments and individuals demonstrates the growing community belief, starting in the nineteenth century, that through scientific research and understanding, humans could solve all problems, including withstanding future weather events through long-range weather prediction.

It also demonstrates the importance of long-range weather forecasting to the rural communities of Australia which encouraged and largely financed the observatory. This enthusiasm and demand is evidenced by the wide distribution of these forecasts throughout Australia in journals, newspapers, published material and correspondence.

The place demonstrates rare, uncommon or endangered aspects of Queensland's cultural heritage.

The Crohamhurst Observatory is rare as the only known long-range weather forecasting observatory in Queensland. Its purpose-built observatory building and surviving open-air meteorological apparatus including deep earth temperature pits, Stevenson Screen and other meteorological devices provide rare surviving evidence of the early practice of long-range weather forecasting, an uncommon aspect of Queensland's cultural heritage.

The place has a special association with the life or work of a particular person, group or organisation of importance in Queensland's history.

The Crohamhurst Observatory has a strong association with the life and work of Inigo Jones, well-known long-range weather forecaster throughout Queensland and Australia, from the 1920s until his death in 1954.
