= Leon Beer (footballer) =

Australian rules footballer

Personal information
- Full name: Leonta Horace Beer
- Nickname: Onty
- Born: 11 February 1903; Townsville, Queensland
- Died: 12 January 1966 (aged 62); Sunshine North, Victoria
- Original team: Yarraville (MJFA)
- Height: 178 cm (5 ft 10 in)
- Weight: 76 kg (168 lb)

Playing career^{1}
Years	Club	Games (Goals)
1920	Yarraville (MJFA)	
1921–1923	South Melbourne (VFL)	15 (2)
1924–1928	Williamstown (VFA)	74 (36)
1929	Yarraville (VFA)	12 (5)
- ^{1} Playing statistics correct to the end of 1929.

Leonta Horace "Onty" Beer (11 February 1903 – 12 January 1966) was an Australian rules footballer who played with South Melbourne in the Victorian Football League (VFL).

== Family ==
The son of Arthur Wills Beer (1856–1925), and Rose Edith Beer (1863–1929), née Newman, Leonta Horace Beer was born at Townsville, Queensland on 11 February 1903 — known as "Onty" (sometimes "Ontie"), he was named "Leonta" after the devastating 1903 Townsville cyclone, identified as such by the Queensland State Government meteorologist C.L. Wragge.

He married Isabella Ivy Brown (1900–1949) in 1922.

== Football ==
=== Williamstown (VFA) ===
Having tried out with Footscray in the preseason, he played his first game for Williamstown, against Hawthorn on 7 June 1924.
