= Inigo Owen Jones =

Australian meteorologist (1872–1954)

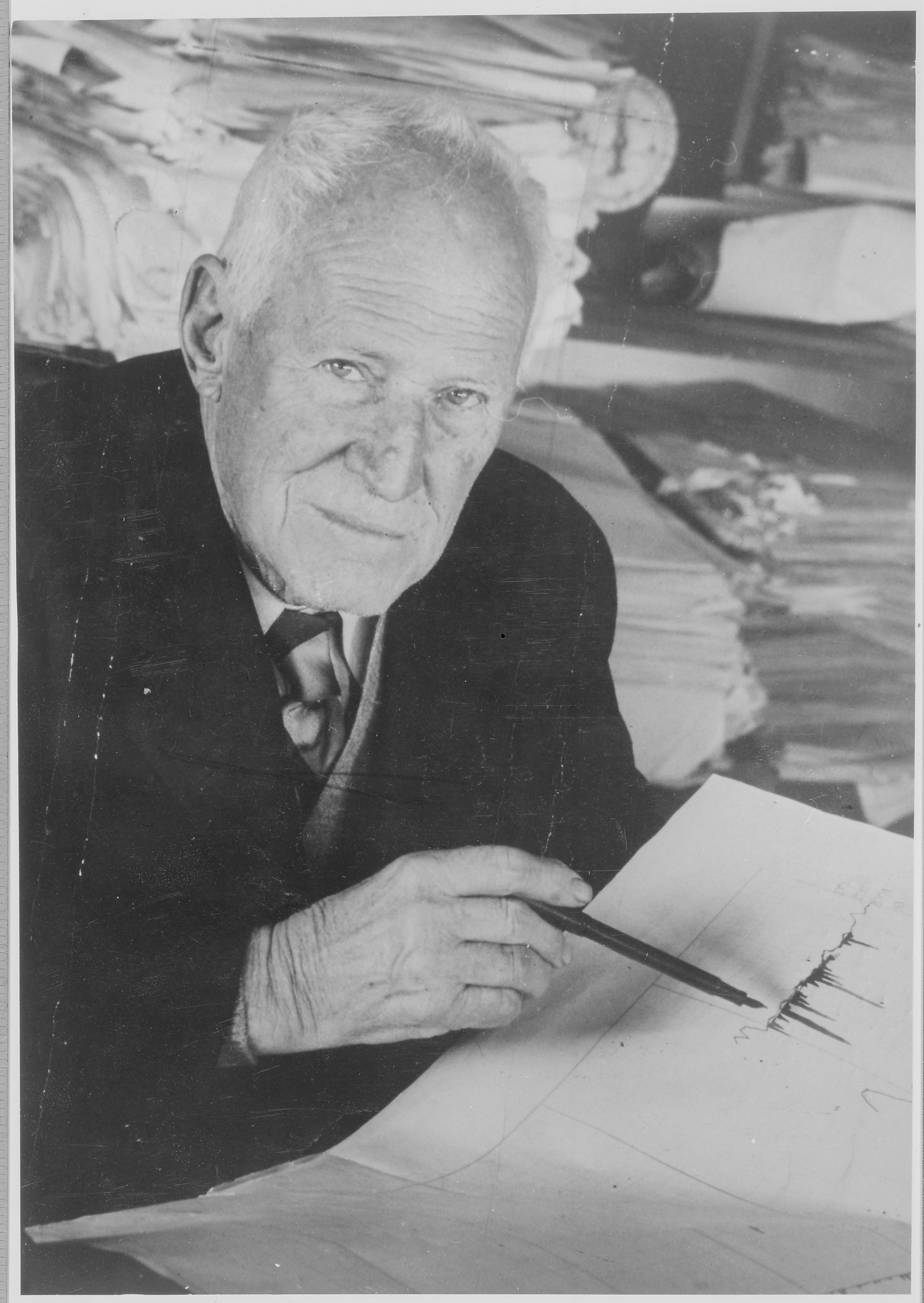
Inigo Owen Jones, circa 1945

Inigo Owen Jones (1 December 1872 – 14 November 1954) was a meteorologist and farmer in Queensland, Australia.

== Early life ==
Inigo Owen Jones was born in Croydon, Surrey, England to Owen Jones, a civil engineer, and Emilie Susanne, née Bernoulli. Emilie's mother was said to have been a Dorothy Inigo-Jones, on which basis it has been claimed Inigo Owen Jones is descended from the architect Inigo Jones; however, the latter never married and there are no records of descendants. His mother was from the Bernoulli family of mathematicians, and Inigo attributed his interest in meteorology and astronomy to this background. Upon his death, his cousin, Archibald Bernoulli, of Melbourne, placed a notice in The Argus newspaper in Melbourne.

In 1874 Jones's parents migrated to Australia, settling on a property which they called "Crohamhurst", (Note: The property was named after Croham Hurst in Surrey, England, owned by Lord Goschen.) near Peachester in the Glass House Mountains north of Brisbane. He became interested in meteorology while working on the family farm.

He was for many years a synodsman of the Brisbane diocese of the Church of England. Inigo married Marion Emma Comrie at Crohamhurst on 11 January 1905.

In 1950 Jones gave the northern part of his farm to the Queensland Government on the condition he and his wife could continue to live on the property until their deaths. This land is now part of the Crohamhurst State Forest.

== Meteorology ==
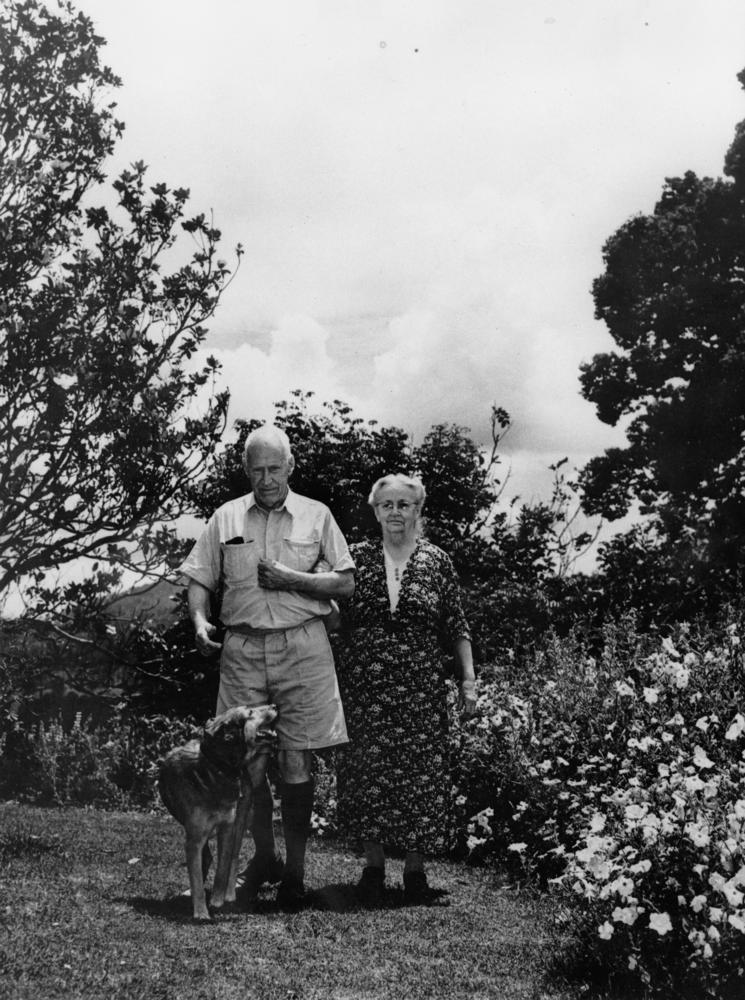
Inigo and Marion Jones in their garden at Crohamhurst, ca 1935

The Queensland Government meteorologist Clement Lindley Wragge was so impressed with Inigo's ability as a schoolboy that he recruited him as an assistant in 1888.

Jones studied the variation in sunspot cycles that had been discovered by Eduard Bruckner, and came to the conclusion that anomalies were caused by the interaction of the planets Jupiter, Saturn, Uranus and Neptune. This became the basis of his long-range weather forecasts, although he never claimed to be able to make day-to-day predictions. Although Jones failed to have his methods recognised as soundly based by any substantial body of accredited scientific opinion, he was widely recognised for his successes, especially by farmers.

Inigo Jones became a full-time forecaster and lecturer in 1927 and founded the privately operated Crohamhurst Observatory in south-east Queensland with financial assistance from the Colonial Sugar Refining Company. An Australian Senate hearing was told in 1938 that Jones was a "wonderful patriot" and that he was "held in the highest esteem by the big man and also the small man on the land".

At the 11 January 1939 meeting of the Australian and New Zealand Association for the Advancement of Science (ANZAAS) his ideas on cyclical variations theory were severely discredited, especially by Edward Kidson, the New Zealand government meteorologist, and yet farmers credited and worked their farms using his long-range forecasts.

== Later life ==
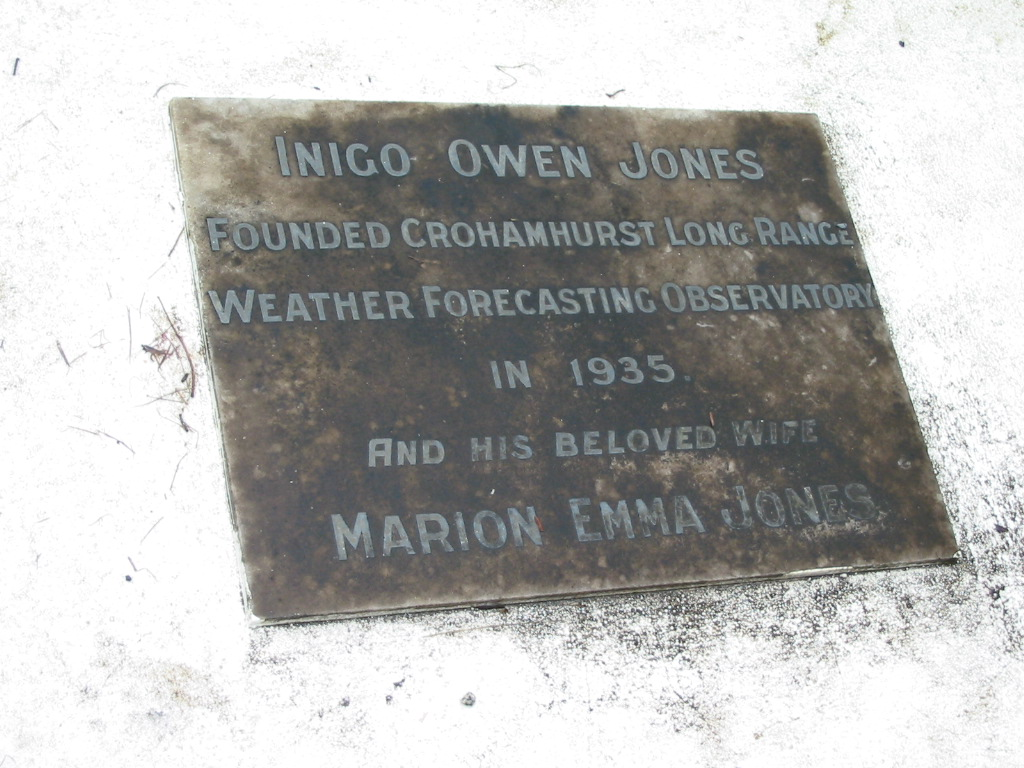
Plaque on his grave, Peachester Cemetery, 2005

Following a heart attack, Jones died at home on his farm at Crohamhurst, Queensland on 14 November 1954. He was buried in the nearby Peachester cemetery.

== Legacy ==
His assistant Lennox Walker expanded Jones' theories and continued marketing long range forecasts until 2000, when he passed the business over to his son Hayden Walker.

The Crohamhurst Observatory was listed on the Queensland Heritage Register in 2008.

== Sources ==
- Australian Science and Technology Heritage Centre (2001). "Federation and Meteorology", retrieved 30 December 2005.
- Commonwealth Bureau of Meteorology (2001). 100 Years of Science and Service Commonwealth Bureau of Meteorology
- Holthouse, Hector (1971). Cyclone. Rigby. ISBN 0-85179-290-1.
- Sherratt, Tim (2005) "Inigo Jones: the weather prophet", retrieved 30 December 2005.
