= Clement Lindley Wragge =

English meteorologist (1852–1922)

Clement Wragge
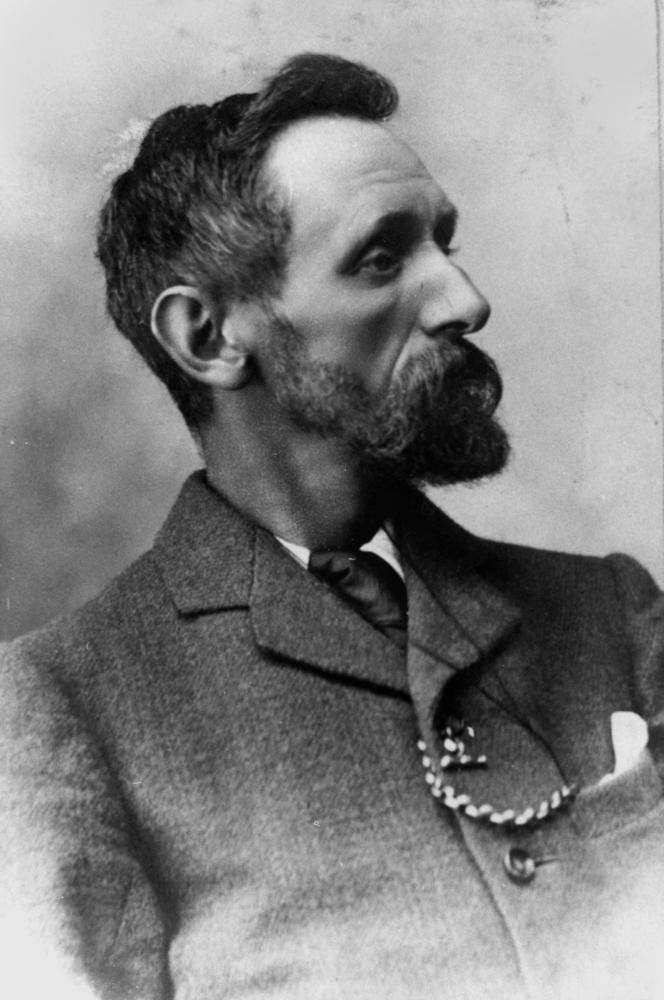
- Clement Wragge, circa 1901
- Born: 18 September 1852; Stourbridge, Worcestershire, England
- Died: 10 December 1922 (aged 70); Auckland, New Zealand
- Occupation: Meteorologist

Clement Lindley Wragge (18 September 1852 – 10 December 1922) was an English meteorologist. He set up the Wragge Museum in Stafford following a trip around the world. He was a Fellow of the Royal Geographical Society and in 1879 was elected Fellow of the Royal Meteorological Society in London. To the end of his life, he was interested in theosophy and spiritualism. In 1908, during a tour of India, he met with Mirza Ghulam Ahmad of Qadian, the founder of the Ahmadiyya movement in Islam who had claimed to be the Mahdi, the messianic redeemer awaited by Muslims. Sir Arthur Conan Doyle sought him out in New Zealand to ask for his views on spiritualism before writing The Wanderings of a Spiritualist in 1921. After training in law, Wragge became a meteorologist, his accomplishments in the field including winning the Scottish Meteorological Society's gold medal and years later starting the trend of using people's names for cyclones. He travelled widely, giving lectures in London and India, and in his later years was an authority on Australia, India and the Pacific Islands.

== Early years ==
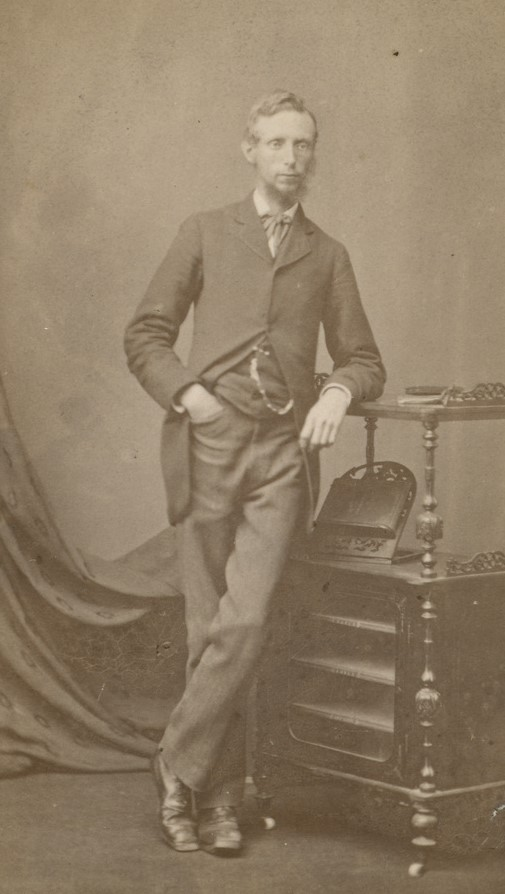
Wragge c. 1880

Wragge was born in Stourbridge, Worcestershire, England. He was originally named William Lindley (Lindley being the name of his great uncle), but this was changed to Clement Lindley. Both of his parents died when he was young: his mother at five months and his father, Clement Ingleby Wragge, at five years following a fall from his horse. He was raised for a number of years by his grandmother, Emma Wragge (née Ingleby) at Oakamoor, Staffordshire who taught him the rudiments of cosmology and meteorology. Emma's husband George had died in 1849 and had managed the Oakamoor works of the Cheadle Brass Wire Company before it was sold to Thomas Bolton in 1852.

Wragge became an avid naturalist at a young age, being surrounded by the beauty of the Churnet valley. He was educated initially at the Church school in Oakamoor, and then his formal education was at Uttoxeter Thomas Alleyne's Grammar School. Wragge hated being a boarder at Uttoxeter and ran away, but was returned to the school where he excelled. Upon the death of his grandmother in 1865 his uncles George and William decided that he should move to London to live with his Aunt Fanny and her family in Teddington. He was considered by his aunt to be spoilt and he rebelled against the harsh treatment. There he later boarded at the Belvedere school in Upper Norwood and at the end of his education he improved his Latin in Cornwall. He then followed in the footsteps of his father, studying law at Lincoln's Inn. He also attended St Bartholomew's Hospital alongside medical students to watch operations. Wragge travelled on the continent of Europe extensively with his Uncle William of Cheltenham. His second cousin was Clement Mansfield Ingleby, a partner in the family law firm Ingleby, Wragge, and Ingleby (which later became known as Wragge & Co of Birmingham), and later a literary scholar. At the age of 21 Wragge came into the inheritance left to him by his parents and a legacy and family silver left to him by his aunt on his mother's side of the family. He decided to take eight months break from Lincoln's Inn to visit the Egypt and the Levant.

In October 1874 Wragge together with a friend Gaze Hoclen departed London on a Thomas Cook tour travelling to Paris by rail and on to Marseilles, where he sailed to Egypt on the Neiman. He travelled up the Nile and took part in an archeological dig. He then toured Palestine, Jerusalem and the Holy sites, where he met a group of Mormons who interested him. He promised to visit their new city being built at Salt Lake in the American West. After much deliberation, he decided not to return to the United Kingdom with his friend and booked a passage through Cooks on the John Tennant via India to Australia, then sailed from Newcastle, Sydney in late August 1875 across the Pacific to San Francisco. Once in San Francisco he travelled by rail across the wild west to Toronto via Salt Lake City. Whilst in Salt Lake City he met briefly with Brigham Young as was his right as a visitor. Later, he wrote a number of articles about Mormons and their religion. In Toronto he met with his cousin Edmund Wragge who became a famous railway engineer in Canada, South Africa and Great Britain. He returned home to Oakamoor to face his Uncle George (of Ingleby, Wragge and Ingleby solicitors) who now had Oakamoor Lodge as a country retreat from his practice in Birmingham and was very displeased with his behaviour. He made the far-reaching decision that the law was not for him, and he surrendered his articles and was trained as a midshipman at Janet Taylor's Nautical Academy in London. In 1876 he sailed to Australia, working his passage to Melbourne. He was a good singer and enjoyed the sea shanties sung when hauling up the sails.

He visited his Ingleby relations in Adelaide, including Rupert Ingleby QC (brother of John Ingleby), and obtained a position with the Surveyor-General's Department in South Australia, participating in surveys of the Flinders Ranges and Murray scrub land. He married on 13 September 1877 Leonora Edith Florence d'Eresby Thornton (her much older sister being married to Rupert Ingleby) and returned to Oakamoor, England on the Hesperus in 1878 with his wife, where he went straight to his lodgings in Oakamoor.

== Meteorology ==
Wragge needed experience in reading weather, and set up two weather stations: one in North Staffordshire in 1879 at Oakamoor railway station for low level readings, and a high level station at Beacon Stoop in the Weaver Hills in North Staffs, not far from Parkhouse farm, Farley, where he moved after a time at Farley Cottage. These readings were made continually until 1883 and the results were sent to him at Ben Nevis when he was in Scotland. He became a prolific writer and was a weekly contributor to the Cheadle Herald newspaper from 1879 to 1885 and Good Words and the Midland Naturalist, who supported his work. He became a firm friend of W. H. Goss, the porcelain manufacturer in Stoke-on-Trent, a fellow member of the North Staffordshire Naturalist and Archeological Field Club.

During 1881 after learning of the Scottish Meteorological Society's plans to establish a weather station on Ben Nevis, Wragge offered to make daily ascents and take meteorological observations. This offer was subsequently accepted, with Wragge climbing to the top of the mountain on most days between 1 June and mid October, while his wife took comparable readings near sea level at Fort William. As a result of these series of observations, Wragge was awarded the Society's gold medal at a meeting in March 1882. After a second series of observations was undertaken in 1882 a Summit Observatory was opened in 1883. Wragge applied for the job of Superintendent, but was unsuccessful, possibly because he had a growing family and it needed someone to spend weeks away from home.

Wragge's wife Leonora gave birth to a daughter, Leonora Ingleby, (later renamed Emma) in Oakamoor 1878 and Clement Lionel Egerton in 1880. His third child Rupert Lindley was born in August 1882 in Scotland. Wragge left for Australia soon after in 1883. His first male child, Clement Lionel Egerton, who was born in Farley, Staffordshire in 1880, would later enlist with the 2nd Light Horse Regiment of the First Australian Imperial Force and die from wounds at Gallipoli on 16 May 1915.

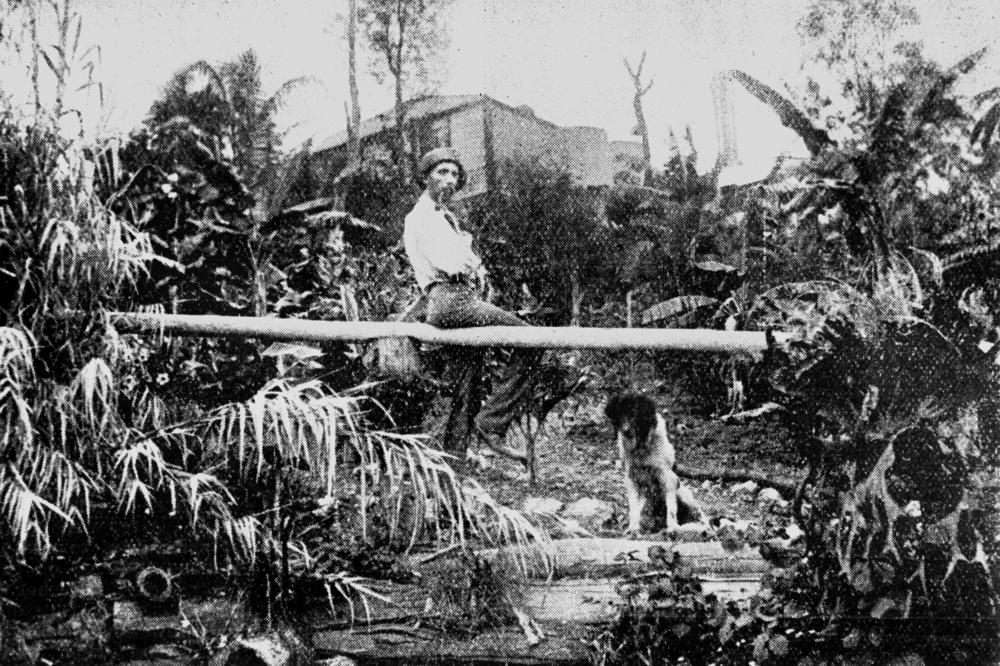
Wragge in his garden at Capemba, Taringa, circa 1902

He decided to return to Australia and left taking his wife, his now famous, faithful dog 'Renzo' and his cat who caused some havoc on the voyage. In 1884 he moved to the outskirts of Adelaide, South Australia and set up a private meteorological observatory. He subsequently set up a weather station on Mount Lofty, and in 1886 was a prime mover in the founding of the Royal Meteorological Society of Australia. His activities subsequently caught the attention of the Queensland Government, who commissioned him to write a report on the development of a meteorological organisation in Queensland that could help stem the shipping losses from cyclones. The Government was impressed with his work and on 1 January 1887 he was appointed Government Meteorologist for Queensland. Within three weeks of his arrival in Brisbane, 18.305 inches (464.9 mm) of rain fell, earning him the nickname "Inclement" Wragge. Wragge built a home, Capemba, at Taringa (now 217 Swann Road).

He quickly caused disquiet amongst meteorologists and astronomers from the other Australian colonies when he started producing charts and predictions not only for Queensland, but for other areas of the continent. He further inflamed them by inscribing his reports Meteorology of Australasia, Chief Weather Bureau, Brisbane and by claiming that while he and his staff were engaged entirely in meteorological research, weather men in other colonies were government astronomers whose time was also filled with postal and telegraph duties.

In the 1880s and 1890s Wragge set up an extensive network of weather stations around Queensland, and developed a series of storm signals to be used upon telegraphed instructions from Brisbane to Cape Moreton, Double Island Point, Sandy Cape, Bustard Head, Cape Capricorn, Flat Top Island, Cape Bowling Green, Cape Cleveland, Cooktown, Thursday Island and Karumba. He also set up an international service with New Caledonia, by which he received data on the newly laid cable from Nouméa. Between 1888 and 1893, Wragge trained Inigo Owen Jones who became a renowned long-range weather forecaster.

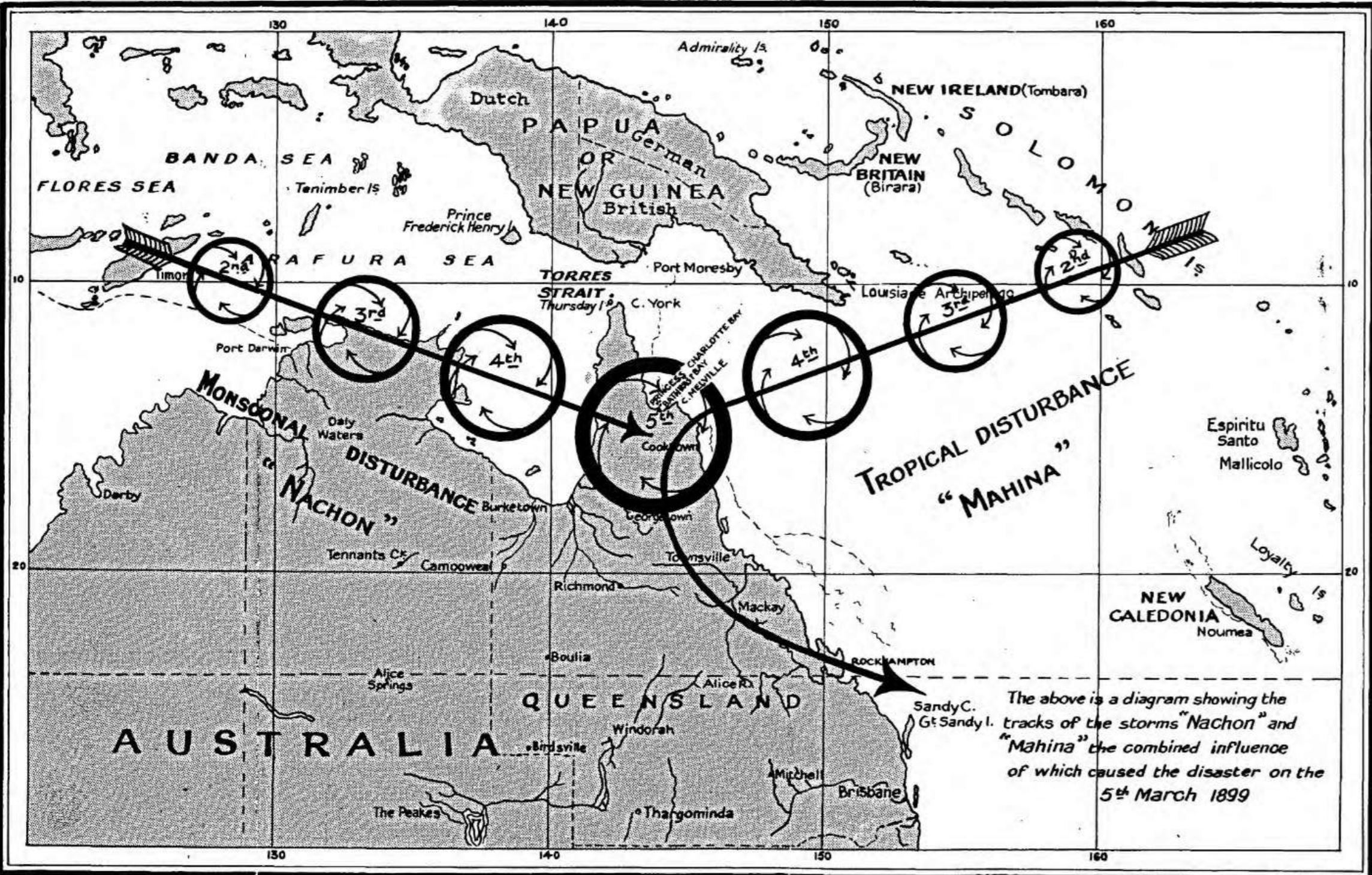
An illustration of Cyclone Mahina by Wragge

In 1895, Wragge set up a weather station near the summit of Mount Wellington, Tasmania, and 1897 established another on Mount Kosciuszko. He also attended international conferences in Munich (1891) and Paris (1898 and 1900).

Wragge was also responsible for the convention of naming cyclones. His original idea was to use letters of the Greek alphabet, but he later used the names of figures from Polynesian mythology, and also politicians, including James Drake, Edmund Barton, and Alfred Deakin. Other colourful names he used included Xerxes, Hannibal, Blasatus and Teman. After Wragge's retirement, the practice of naming cyclones would cease for sixty years.

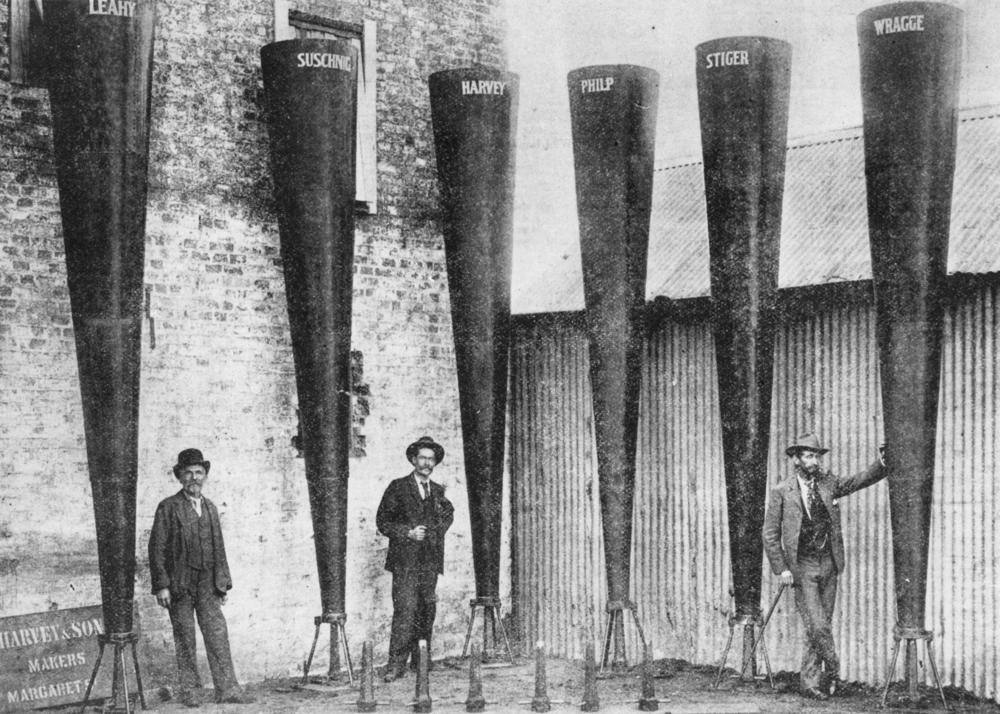
Steiger vortex cannons

In 1898 Wragge began publishing Wragge's Australian Weather Guide and Almanac, which contained not just meteorological information, but contributions on geology, bush craft, agriculture, mining, water supplies and postal information. In an effort to break the drought of 1902 he purchased a number of Steiger Vortex Cannons, which were supposedly able to bring rain from the clouds. Test firings at Charleville on 26 September were unsuccessful. Wragge was not there to see the actual experiment, having left town after an argument with the local council. Two of the cannons are on display in Charleville.

Wragge resigned in 1903 when the weather bureau of Queensland was combined with other states following the Federation of Australia, which downgraded his role from a chief to a subordinate.

== Later years ==
Wragge in his later years in the gardens at Birkenhead

Wragge travelled for a number of years after finishing with the Queensland Government. In 1904 he visited the Cook Islands, New Caledonia and Tahiti to examine local fauna, and wrote a report on caterpillars and paper wasps for the government in Rarotonga.

He applied unsuccessfully for the job of (Australian) Commonwealth Meteorologist at the Bureau of Meteorology in 1908 before returning to New Zealand. He lived for a time in Dunedin before settling at 8 Awanui Street (previously named Arawa St and prior to that Bath St), Birkenhead, Auckland with his de facto wife Louisa Emmeline (known as Edris) Horne, an Anglo-Indian theosophist. There he founded the Wragge Institute and Museum which was later partly destroyed by fire, including most of his written works and diaries, and also the well known visitor attraction – Waiata tropical gardens.

Between 1900 and 1922, Wraggle gave lectures on the magic lantern, a type of image projector. These lectures, titled, "A Voyage through the Universe" (1902), "The Majesty of Creation" (1906), "The Grandeur of the Universe" (1912), and "The Endless Universe and Eternal Life" (1918–22) were accompanied by a collection of 350 lantern slides. The collection of slides reside with Auckland War Memorial Museum.

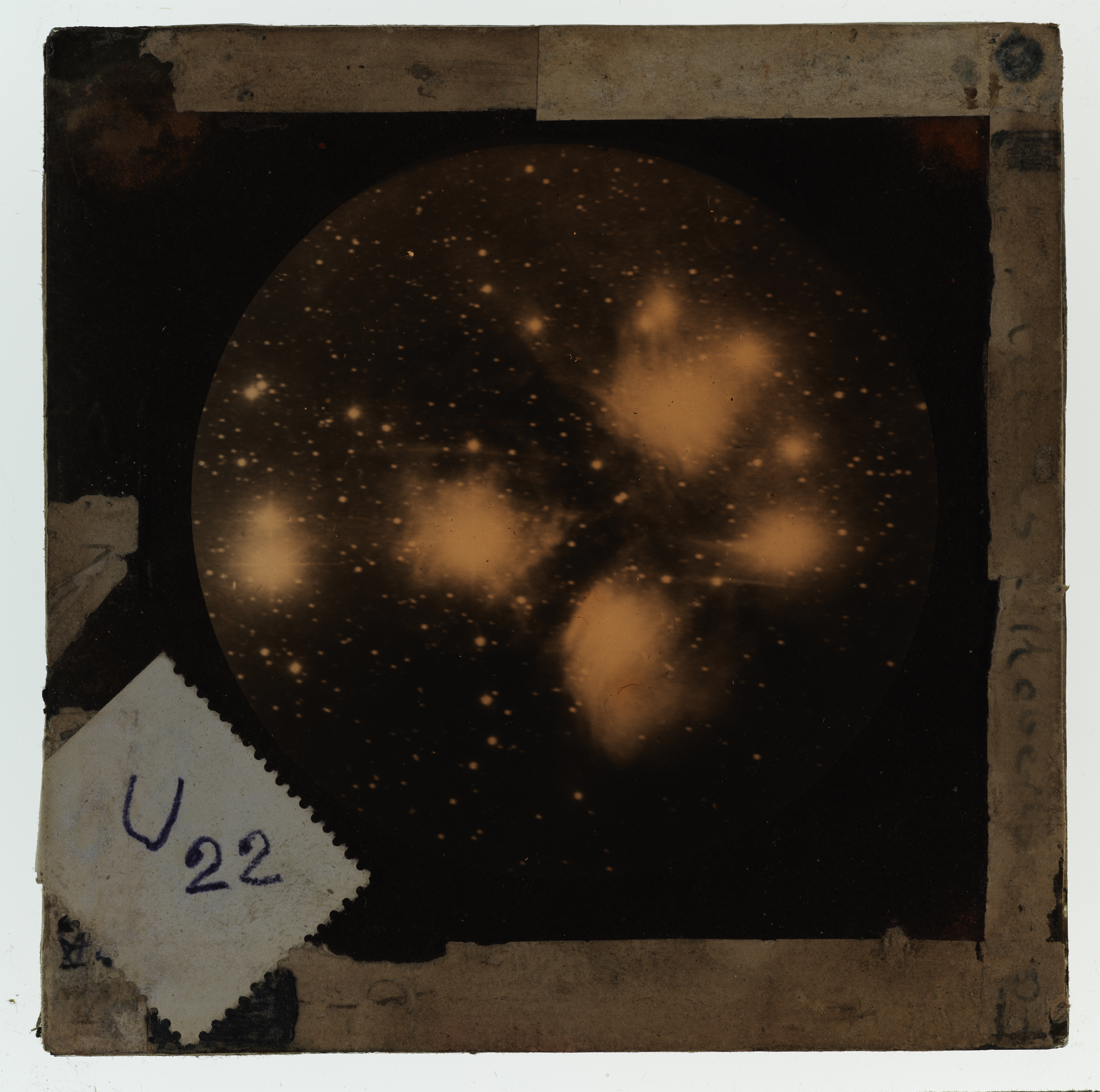
Wraggle, C. Depicts clusters of stars and nebulae.

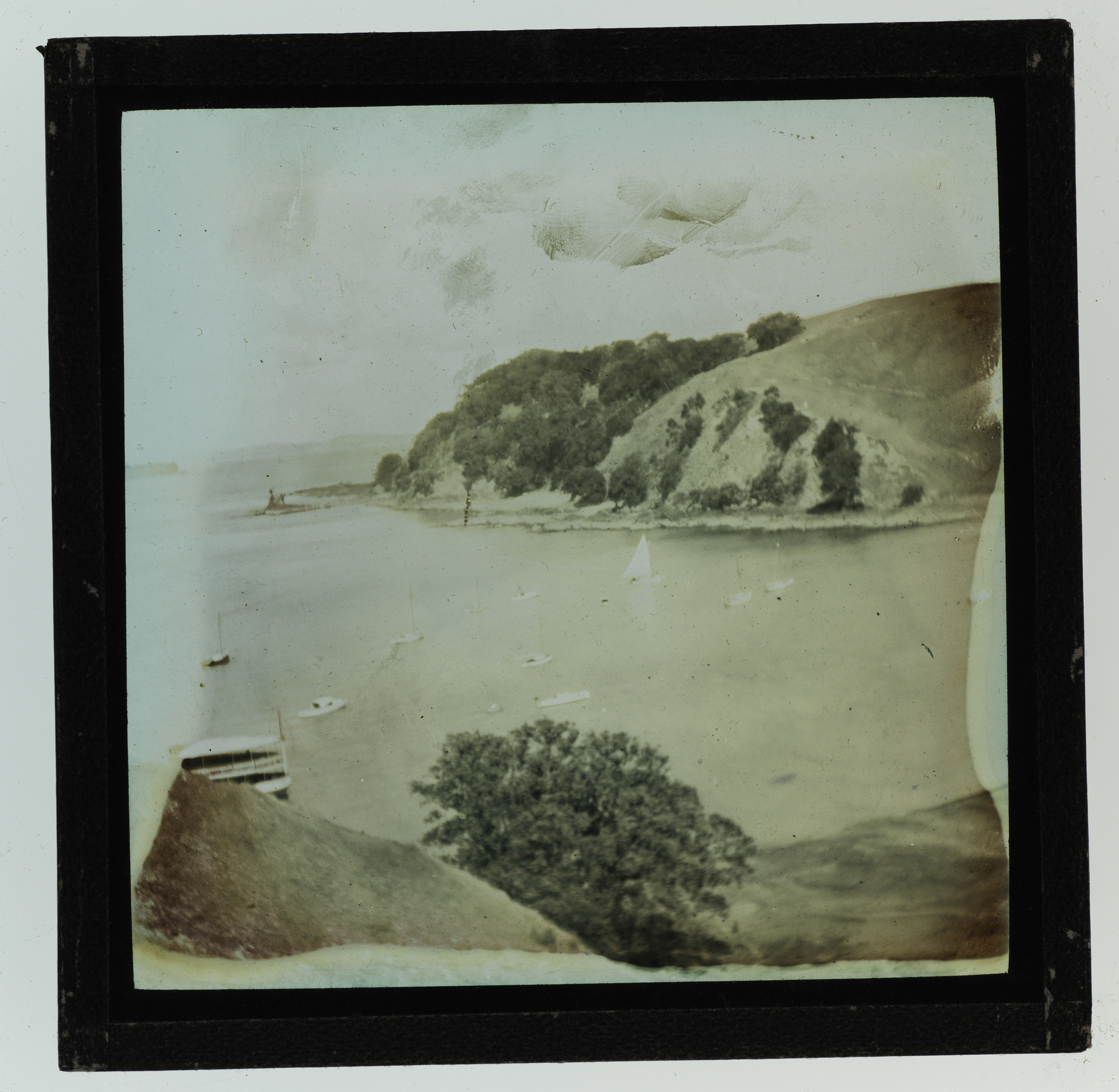
Wraggle, C. Photograph taken from a hill overlooking a bay.

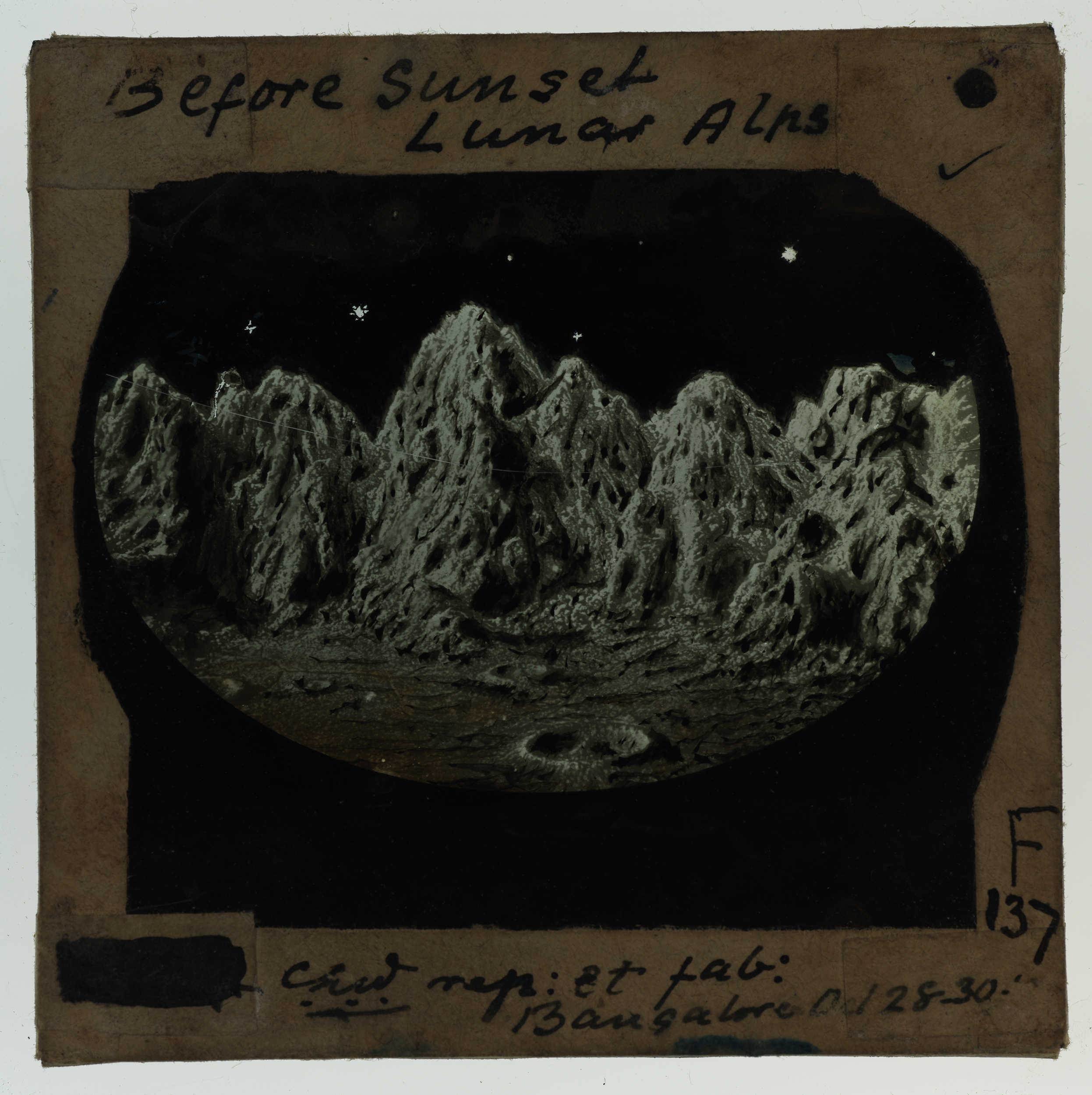
Wraggle, C. Lunar Alps before sunset (Fiji).

During his tour to India in 1908, Wragge met Mirza Ghulam Ahmad, who had claimed to be the Promised Messiah foretold in the Bible and Islamic scriptures. The dialogues between the two are recorded in the Malfūzāt, the discourses of Ghulam Ahmad. Some of his followers believe that Wragge had converted to Islam and stayed a Muslim until his death. Proof of his conversion is cited by Ahmadiyya Muslim scholars in the form of letters written to Mufti Muhammad Sadiq, a companion of Ghulam Ahmad, by Prof. Wragge after his meeting with Ghulam Ahmad at Lahore. However, more personal family records suggest that Wragge remained a theosophist up until his death in 1922.

Clement Wragge died on 10 December 1922 in Auckland from a stroke. His son by his de facto wife Louisa, Kismet K Wragge, stayed on as "First Officer" of the Wragge Institute.
