= List of bridges in Australia =

== Historical bridges ==
This table contains a non-exhaustive list of bridges listed on the various heritage registers of Australia.

Note one important bridge not in this list is the first Australian all-concrete railway bridge built in 1907 at Watson's Gap, near Port Elliott in South Australia (see note below).

#	Name	Image	Heritage register	Length		Type	Carries Crosses	Opened	Location	State	Notes
#	Name	Image	Heritage register	m	ft	Type	Carries Crosses	Opened	Location	State	Notes
1	Richmond Bridge		Australian National Heritage (Australia’s oldest surviving large stone arch bridge)	41	135	Masonry; 6 arches, sandstone	Wellington Street; Coal River	1825	Richmond; 42°44′01.9″S 147°26′24.0″E	Tasmania	
2	Lennox Bridge		(Now defunct); Register of the National Estate			Masonry; 1 arch	Road bridge Mitchells Pass; Lapstone Creek	1833	Glenbrook; 33°45′15.2″S 150°37′56.6″E	New South Wales	
3	Lansdowne Bridge		(Now defunct); Register of the National Estate			Masonry; 1 arch, sandstone Span: 33.5 m (110 ft)	Hume Highway; Prospect Creek	1836	Lansvale; 33°53′24.1″S 150°58′01.5″E	New South Wales	
4	Ross Bridge		(Now defunct); Register of the National Estate			Masonry; 3 arches	Roseneath Road; Macquarie River	1836	Ross; 41°01′50.7″S 147°29′23.1″E	Tasmania	
5	Red Bridge		(Now defunct); Register of the National Estate (Australia’s oldest surviving brick arch bridge)			Masonry; 3 arches, brick	Midland Highway (Tasmania); Elizabeth River	1838	Campbell Town; 41°55′58.7″S 147°29′33.9″E	Tasmania	
6	Nepean River railway bridge		New South Wales State Heritage Register	145	476	Beam bridge Wrought iron	Main Southern railway line Nepean River	1863	Menangle; 34°07′04.8″S 150°44′37.1″E	New South Wales	
7	Prince Alfred Bridge		New South Wales State Heritage Register (First iron truss bridge to be built in New South Wales) (Second-oldest metal truss bridge remaining in Australia)	922	3,025	Truss; Wooden, iron	Murrumbidgee River and its floodplain	1867	Gundagai; 35°04′28″S 148°06′25″E	New South Wales	
8	Dickabram Bridge		Register of the National Estate	191	627	Truss; Steel, wood	Miva Road; Mary River	1886	Miva - Theebine; 25°57′14.5″S 152°29′43.5″E	Queensland	
9	Princes Bridge			120	390	Arch; Cast iron	Road bridge St Kilda Road; Yarra River	1888	Melbourne; Melbourne central business district - Southbank; 37°49′09.3″S 144°58′05.8″E	Victoria	
10	Hampden Bridge		(Now defunct); Register of the National Estate	77	253	Suspension; Wooden truss deck, masonry pylons	Kangaroo River	1898	Kangaroo Valley; 34°43′38.7″S 150°31′15.2″E	New South Wales	
11	Pyrmont Bridge		(Now defunct); Register of the National Estate	369	1,211	Truss; Steel; Swing bridge	Footbridge; Cockle Bay	1902	Sydney; Darling Harbour - Sydney central business district 33°52′14.0″S 151°12′02.6″E	New South Wales	
12	Noojee Trestle Bridge		Victorian Heritage Register (Tallest surviving trestle bridge in Victoria)	102	335	Trestle; Wood	Noojee railway line (closed line)	1919	Noojee; 37°54′01.9″S 145°59′03.6″E	Victoria	
13	Maribyrnong River Viaduct		Victorian Heritage Register	383	1,257	Trestle; Steel	Albion–Jacana railway line Maribyrnong River	1929	Melbourne; Sunshine North - Keilor East; 37°44′50.4″S 144°50′46.0″E	Victoria	
14	William Jolly Bridge		Queensland Heritage Register	500	1,600	Arch; Concrete through arch	Grey Street; Brisbane River	1932	Brisbane; Brisbane central business district - South Brisbane; 27°28′06.7″S 153°00′55.9″E	Queensland	
15	Grafton Bridge		New South Wales State Heritage Register (This bridge is a double-deck road/rail structure, the only one of its type in New South Wales. There is a lift span to allow passing of river traffic that is no longer in use.)	525	1,722	Bascule Truss Bridge; Concrete; Steel	Bent Street; Clarence River	1932	Grafton; 29°41′53″S 152°56′32″E	New South Wales	
16	McKillops Bridge		Victorian Heritage Register	255	837	Truss; Concrete; Wood	McKillops Road; Snowy River	1936	Deddick Valley; 37°5′01.7″S 148°24′48.7″E	Victoria	

== Bridges of architectural interest ==
This table contains a non-exhaustive list of bridges of architectural interest, as determined by the Engineers Australia and/or other architectural organisations, as cited.

#	Name	Image	Architectural distinction	Length		Type	Carries Crosses	Opened	Location	State	Notes
#	Name	Image	Architectural distinction	m	ft	Type	Carries Crosses	Opened	Location	State	Notes
1	Evan Walker Bridge					Arch; Steel tied-arch Span: 45 m (148 ft)	Footbrige; Yarra River	1992	Melbourne; Melbourne central business district - Southbank; 37°49′10.6″S 144°57′54.5″E	Victoria	
2	Jack Pesch Bridge			243	797	Cable-stayed; Steel truss deck, steel pylons Span: 167 m (548 ft)	Footbridge; Brisbane River	1998	Brisbane; Indooroopilly - Chelmer; 27°30′21.1″S 152°58′27.2″E	Queensland	
3	Goodwill Bridge			450	1,480	Arch; Steel through arch Span: 102 m (335 ft)	Footbridge; Brisbane River	2001	Brisbane; South Brisbane - Gardens Point; 27°28′50.7″S 153°01′37.0″E	Queensland	
4	Webb Bridge			225	738	Bridge	Footbridge; Yarra River	2003	Melbourne; Docklands; 37°49′23.8″S 144°56′50.2″E	Victoria	
5	Kurilpa Bridge		Tensegrity bridge	425	1,394	Cable-stayed; Steel; Span: 135 m (443 ft)	Footbridge; Brisbane River	2009	Brisbane; Brisbane central business district - South Brisbane; 27°28′09.7″S 153°01′05.5″E	Queensland	
6	Seafarers Bridge					Masonry; 2 arches Span: 75 m (246 ft)	Footbridge; Yarra River	2009	Melbourne; Docklands - South Wharf; 37°49′25.3″S 144°57′07.2″E	Victoria	
7	Matagarup Bridge			370	1,210	Arch; Steel through arch Span: 160 m (520 ft)	Footbridge; Swan River	2018	Perth; 31°57′16.2″S 115°53′07.3″E	Western Australia	
8	Neville Bonner Bridge proposed			270	890	Cable-stayed; Steel; Span: 145 m (476 ft)	Footbridge; Brisbane River		Brisbane; Brisbane central business district - South Brisbane; 27°28′26.4″S 153°01′20.2″E	Queensland	

== Major road and railway bridges ==
This table presents a non-exhaustive list of the road and railway bridges with spans greater than 100 metres (328 ft).

Image	#	Name	Span		Length		Type	Carries Crosses	Opened	Location	State	Notes
Image	#	Name	m	ft	m	ft	Type	Carries Crosses	Opened	Location	State	Notes
1	Sydney Harbour Bridge		503	1,650	1,149	3,770	Arch; Steel through arch	Bradfield Highway; North Shore railway line Port Jackson	1932	Sydney; Milsons Point - Dawes Point; 33°51′07.4″S 151°12′38.7″E	New South Wales	
2	Anzac Bridge		345	1,132	625	2,051	Cable-stayed; Concrete beam deck, concrete pylons 140+345+140	Western Distributor; Johnstons Bay	1996	Sydney; Rozelle - Pyrmont; 33°52′08.8″S 151°11′08.6″E	New South Wales	(Note: The length given only takes into account the main bridge, central span(s) and shore span(s), approach viaducts are not counted.)
3	Tasman Bridge		1,000	3,300 (x21)	1,396	4,580	Girder bridge Prestressed concrete beam deck, concrete pylons	Tasman Highway; River Derwent	1964	Hobart; Queens Domain - Montagu Bay; 42°51′54″S 147°20′33″E	Tasmania	
4	West Gate Bridge		336	1,102	2,582	8,471	Cable-stayed; Steel box girder deck, steel pylons 144+336+144	West Gate Freeway; Yarra River	1978	Melbourne; Spotswood - Port Melbourne; 37°49′48.0″S 144°53′55.9″E	Victoria	
5	Gladesville Bridge		305	1,001	488	1,601	Arch; Concrete deck arch	North Western Expressway; Parramatta River	1964	Sydney; Huntleys Point - Drummoyne; 33°50′31.9″S 151°08′52.3″E	New South Wales	
6	Story Bridge		282	925	777	2,549	Cantilever; Steel; 82+282+82	Bradfield Highway; Brisbane River	1940	Brisbane; Fortitude Valley - Kangaroo Point; 27°27′49.0″S 153°02′08.7″E	Queensland	
7	Sir Leo Hielscher Bridges		260	850	1,630	5,350	Box girder Prestressed concrete 162+260+162; Twin bridges	Gateway Motorway; Brisbane River	1986; 2010	Brisbane; Eagle Farm - Murarrie; 27°26′43.0″S 153°06′04.4″E	Queensland	
8	Mooney Mooney Bridge		220	720	485	1,591	Box girder Prestressed concrete 134+220+130; Twin bridges	Pacific Motorway; Mooney Mooney Creek	1986	Mooney Mooney Creek; 33°25′56.8″S 151°15′13.1″E	New South Wales	
9	Batman Bridge		215	705	432	1,417	Cable-stayed; Steel truss deck, inclined steel pylon	Batman Highway; Tamar River	1968	Sidmouth - Hillwood; 41°13′02.0″S 146°54′52.6″E	Tasmania	
10	Eleanor Schonell Bridge		184	604	520	1,710	Cable-stayed; Composite steel/concrete deck, concrete pylons 30+73+184+73+30	Buses, cyclists and pedestrians Brisbane River	2006	Brisbane; St Lucia - Dutton Park; 27°29′51.9″S 153°01′15.7″E	Queensland	
11	Walter Taylor Bridge		183	600	300	980	Suspension; Steel truss deck, concrete pylons	Coonan Street; Brisbane River	1936	Brisbane; Indooroopilly - Chelmer; 27°30′20.4″S 152°58′25.1″E	Queensland	
12	Rip Bridge		183	600	330	1,080	Arch; Concrete arch deck	Maitland Bay Drive; Brisbane Water		Daleys Point - Blackwall; 33°30′24.6″S 151°20′48.1″E	New South Wales	
13	Captain Cook Bridge		183	600	555	1,821	Box girder Prestressed concrete 73+183+146+110+73; Twin bridges	Pacific Motorway; Brisbane River	1972	Brisbane; Gardens Point - Kangaroo Point; 27°28′51.3″S 153°01′45.7″E	Queensland	
14	Bolte Bridge		173	568 (x2)	490	1,610	Box girder Prestressed concrete 72+173+173+72	CityLink; Yarra River	1999	Melbourne; Docklands - Port Melbourne; 37°49′10.1″S 144°55′56.1″E	Victoria	
15	Long Gully Bridge dismantled in 1937		152	499			Suspension; Steel truss deck, masonry pylons	Strathallen Avenue; Sydney tram network Flat Rock Creek	1892	Sydney; Northbridge - Cammeray; 33°49′01.4″S 151°12′44.5″E	New South Wales	
16	Pheasants Nest Bridge		150	490	304	997	Box girder Prestressed concrete 77+150+77; Twin bridges	Hume Highway; Nepean River	1980	Pheasants Nest; 34°14′12.9″S 150°39′44.3″E	New South Wales	
17	Victoria Bridge		146	479	313	1,027	Box girder Prestressed concrete	Melbourne Street - Queen Street; Brisbane River	1969	Brisbane; Brisbane CBD - South Brisbane; 27°28′20.4″S 153°01′16.3″E	Queensland	
18	Hawkesbury River railway bridge		135	443 (x2)	785	2,575	Truss; Steel; 135+106x4+135	Main North railway line Hawkesbury River	1946	Cogra Bay - Brooklyn; 33°32′01.5″S 151°13′42.9″E	New South Wales	
19	Peats Ferry Bridge		134	440 (x2)	611	2,005	Truss; Steel; 43+134+134+90x8	Pacific Highway; Hawkesbury River	1945	Mooney Mooney - Brooklyn; 33°32′24.2″S 151°11′56.2″E	New South Wales	
20	Merivale Bridge		133	436	750	2,460	Arch; Steel tied-arch	Gold Coast railway line North Coast railway line Brisbane River	1978	Brisbane; Brisbane CBD - South Brisbane; 27°28′09.6″S 153°00′47.1″E	Queensland	
21	Go Between Bridge		117	384	300	980	Box girder Prestressed concrete 80+117+74	Road bridge Brisbane River	2010	Brisbane; Brisbane CBD - South Brisbane; 27°28′11.3″N 153°00′44.1″E	Queensland	
22	Bowen Bridge		109	358 (x8)	976	3,202	Box girder Prestressed concrete 56+109x8+48	Goodwood Road; River Derwent	1984	Hobart; 42°49′03.1″S 147°18′26.5″E	Tasmania	
23	Sea Cliff Bridge		108	354 (x3)	455	1,493	Box girder Prestressed concrete 62+108x3+61	Lawrence Hargrave Drive	2005	Clifton - Coalcliff; 34°15′14.8″S 150°58′24.5″E	New South Wales	
24	Long Gully Bridge		105	344	152	499	Arch; Concrete deck arch	Strathallen Avenue; Flat Rock Creek	1939	Sydney; Northbridge - Cammeray; 33°49′01.2″S 151°12′44.5″E	New South Wales	
25	Albert Bridge		104	341 (x2)	208	682	Truss; Steel; 104x2	Main railway line Brisbane River	1895	Brisbane; Indooroopilly - Chelmer; 27°30′21.4″S 152°58′26.5″E	Queensland	
26	Indooroopilly Railway Bridge		104	341 (x2)	208	682	Truss; Steel; 104x2	Main railway line Brisbane River	1957	Brisbane; Indooroopilly - Chelmer; 27°30′21.2″S 152°58′25.9″E	Queensland	
27	Macleay Valley Bridge				3,200	10,500	Beam; Prestressed concrete 94x34m	Pacific Highway; Macleay River	2013	Frederickton; 31°02′10.5″S 152°53′12.4″E	New South Wales	
28	South Road Superway				2,800	9,200	Box girder Prestressed concrete	North-South Motorway	2014	Adelaide; Wingfield - Regency Park; 34°50′59.2″S 138°33′52.6″E	South Australia	
29	Houghton Highway				2,740	8,990	Beam; Prestressed concrete	State Road 26; State Road 27; Bramble Bay	1979	Brisbane; Brighton - Clontarf; 27°16′29.3″S 153°04′14.1″E	Queensland	
30	Ted Smout Memorial Bridge				2,740	8,990	Beam; Prestressed concrete 78x35m	State Road 26; State Road 27; Bramble Bay	2010	Brisbane; Brighton - Clontarf; 27°16′30.1″S 153°04′15.6″E	Queensland	
31	Hornibrook Bridge dismantled in 2011				2,684	8,806	Beam; Wood, concrete piles	Bramble Bay	1935	Brisbane; Brighton - Clontarf; 27°16′28.6″S 153°04′12.8″E	Queensland	

== Notes and references ==
- Notes
- "Heritage places and lists". Department of the Environment. Australian Government.
- Janberg, Nicolas. "International Database for Civil and Structural Engineering". Structurae.com.

- SA Government Department of Environment Register nomination report Heritage significance, Watson's Gap Bridge.

- Other references

== See also ==
- Transport in Australia
- Rail transport in Australia
- Geography of Australia
- Historic bridges of New South Wales
- List of bridges in Sydney
- List of bridges in Brisbane
- List of bridges in Melbourne
- List of bridges in Perth, Western Australia
- List of bridges in Hobart
- Bridges over the Brisbane River
- List of crossings of the Murray River
- Crossings of the Yarra River
