= Brighton, Queensland =

Brighton
- Suburb
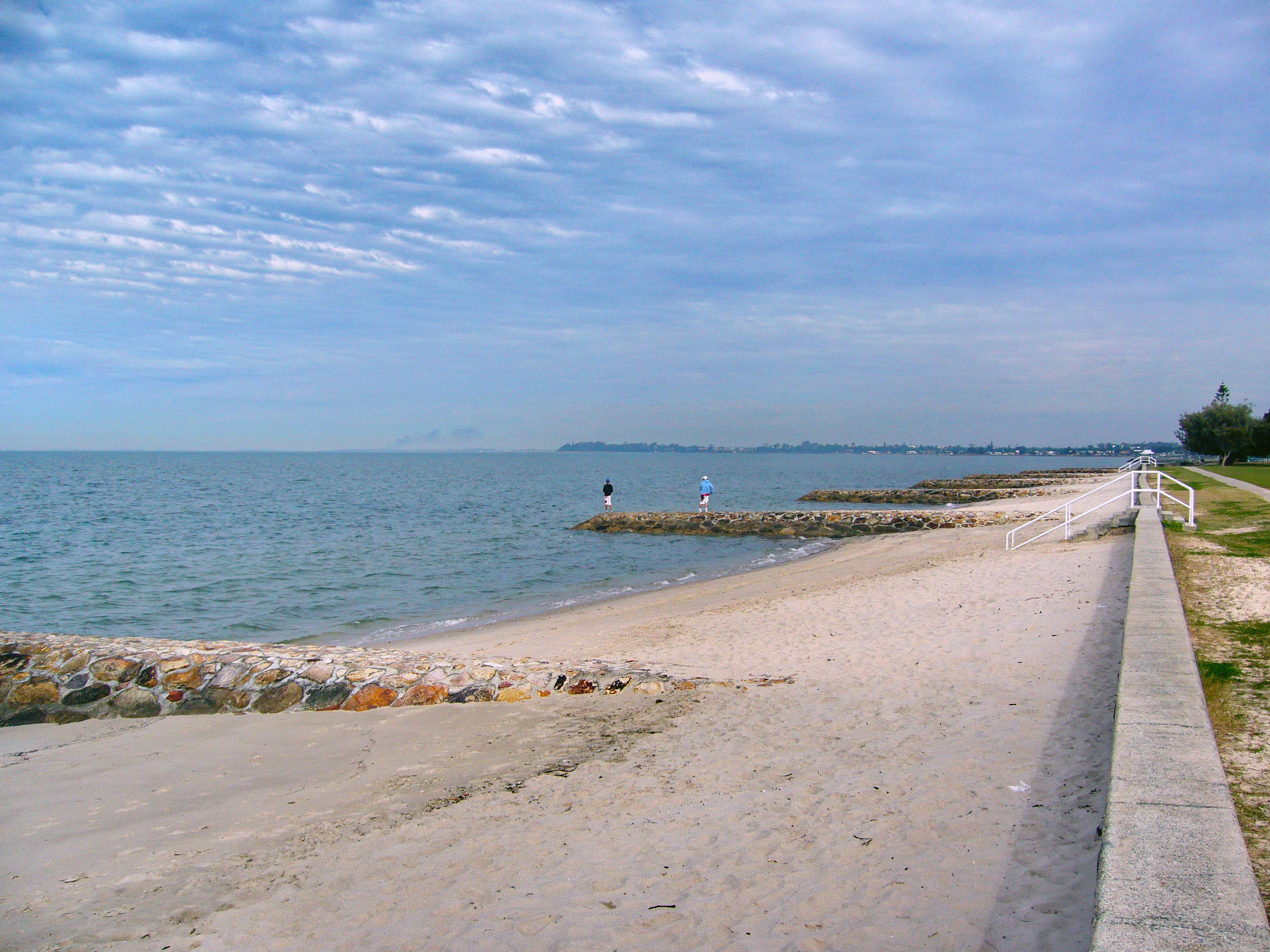
- Brighton shoreline at Bramble Bay (looking south), 2010

- Interactive map of Brighton
- Coordinates: 27.2986°S 153.0572°E
- Country: Australia
- State: Queensland
- City: Brisbane
- LGA: City of Brisbane (Deagon Ward)
- Location: 27.9 km (17.3 mi) NNE of Brisbane CBD

Government
  - State electorate: Sandgate
  - Federal division: Lilley

Area
  - Total: 7.6 km^{2} (2.9 sq mi)

Population
  - Total: 10,241 (2026 census)
  - Density: 1,348/km^{2} (3,490/sq mi)
- Time zone: UTC+10:00 (AEST)
- Postcode: 4017
Suburbs around Brighton
Griffin	Griffin	Bramble Bay
Bald Hills	Brighton	Bramble Bay
Bracken Ridge	Sandgate	Sandgate

Brighton is a coastal northern suburb of the City of Brisbane, in the state of Queensland, in Australia. In the 2026 census, Brighton had a population of 10,241 people.

== Geography ==
Brighton and its neighbouring suburb Bald Hills are the northernmost suburbs of Brisbane. Brighton is located 27.9 kilometres (17.3 mi) by road north of the Brisbane CBD.

The suburb is bounded to the north by the Pine River, to the north-east and east by Bramble Bay (a side bay of Moreton Bay), to the south by Bracken Ridge Road, to the south-east by the Deagon Deviation, and to the east by Bald Hills Creek.

The Deagon Deviation enters the suburb from the south-east (Bracken Ridge / Sandgate) and follows the course of Bald Hills Creek before exiting to the north-east to become the Houghton Highway and Ted Smout Memorial Bridge (the pair of bridges across Hays Inlet to Clontarf in the City of Moreton Bay).

Nashville is a neighbourhood in the south-west of the suburb (27.3127°S 153.0583°E).

Brighton has been mostly developed as suburban housing. In the north of the suburb there is some rural residential development and undeveloped wetlands. In the south-west of the locality are undeveloped wetlands which include Third Lagoon (27.3109°S 153.0527°E). The lagoon is so-called as it is one of the three lagoons of the Sandgate area, the first being Einbunpin Lagoon and the second being Dowse Lagoon which are both within the suburb of Sandgate.

== History ==
The Brighton Hotel located along Beaconsfield Terrace was believed to be built by David Rowntree Somerset. An early settler, Captain William Townsend, bought the Brighton Hotel and used it as his home and, once sold in 1893, it was used as an orphanage. It resumed being a hotel in 1912. The suburb takes its name from the hotel, which is believed to be named after Brighton in Sussex, England.

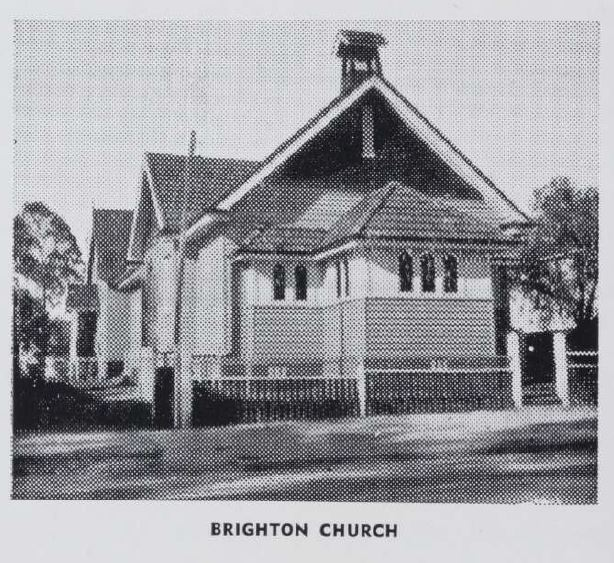
Brighton Methodist Church, circa 1947

Land for a Methodist church was purchased in 1914. In January 1917, a small Sunday school was opened on the site. In 1919, a Methodist church building was relocated from Killarney (where it had opened in 1902) to the Brighton site, where it was erected and officially opened on Saturday 5 June 1920. On Saturday 2 December 1939, 500 people attended the opening of a new church building by Reverend F. A. Malcolm, the President of the Methodist Conference. The previous church was relocated to the rear of the site to be used as a Sunday school hall. In 1977, the church joined in the amalgamation that created the Uniting Church in Australia becoming the Brighton Uniting Church. The church at 41 Deagon Street (27.3136°S 153.0628°E) was closed circa 1999, and was later sold and the church and hall (the former church) were converted into a house. It is now within the suburb boundaries of Sandgate. It is listed on the Brisbane Heritage Register.

Brighton State School opened on 27 January 1920.

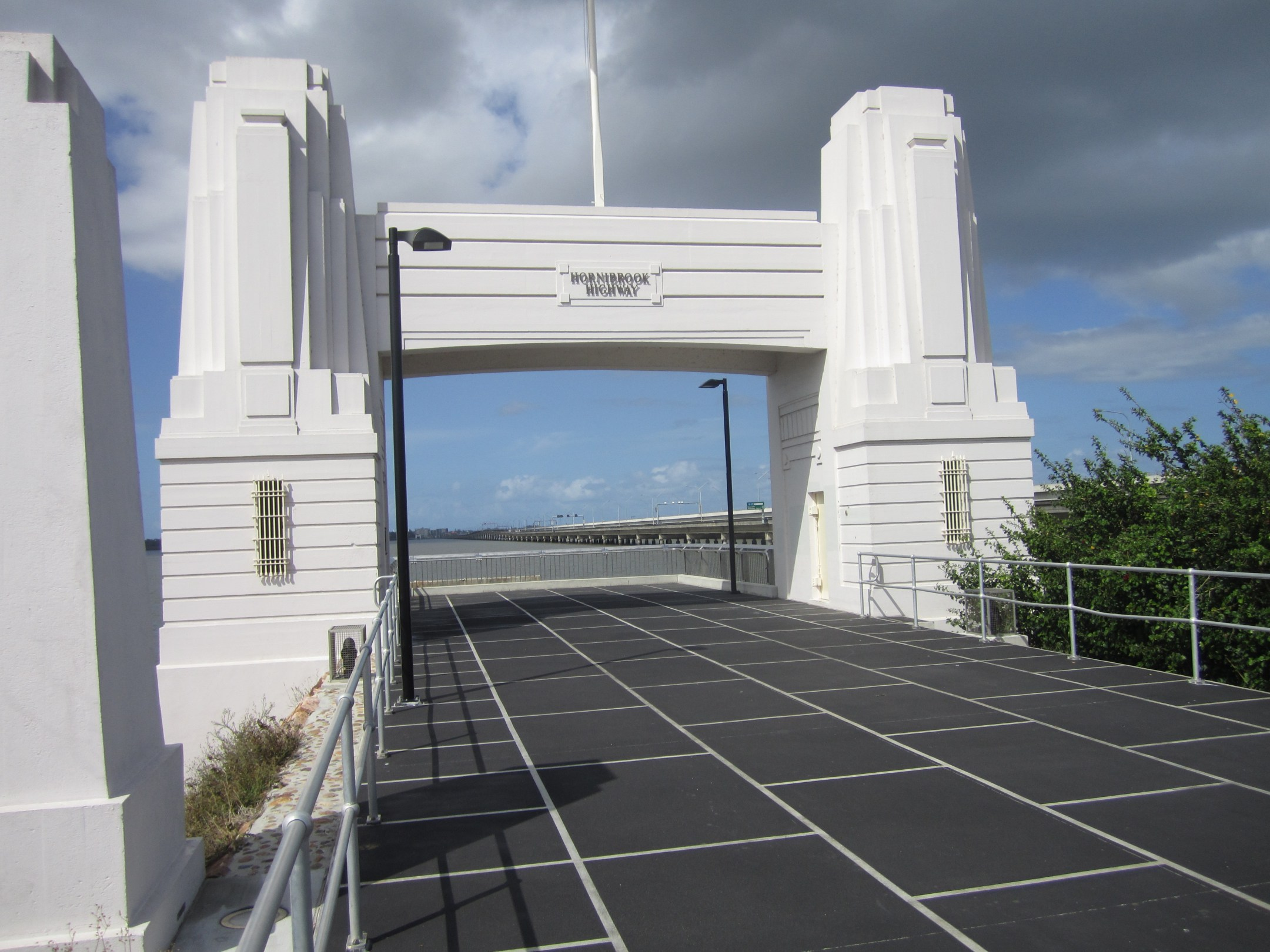
Southern portal of the Hornibrook Bridge, 2010

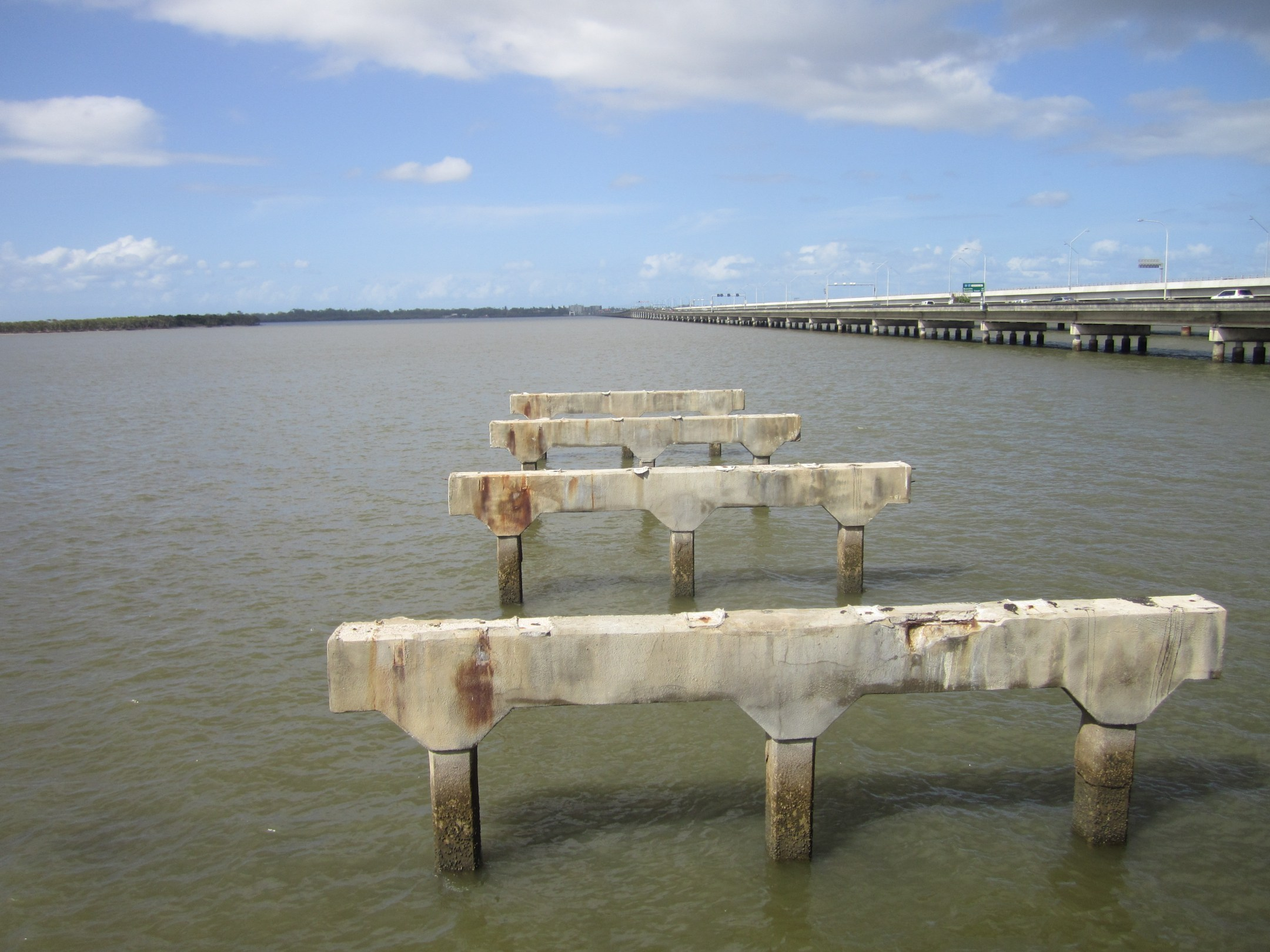
Remains of the Brighton end of the Hornibrook Highway Bridge after demolition, 2012

Since 1935, three bridges have connected Brisbane to Redcliffe Peninsula between Brighton at their southern end and Clontarf on the peninsula at their northern end. The first of these to be built was the Hornibrook Bridge, which opened on 4 October 1935. On 20 December 1979, a second bridge known as the Houghton Highway was opened and the Hornibrook Bridge was closed to traffic, but could still be used by pedestrians, cyclists, and for fishing. On 11 July 2010, the third bridge, the Ted Smout Memorial Bridge, opened, enabling the Houghton Highway to be used for northbound traffic and the Ted Smout Memorial Bridge to be used for southbound traffic. Due to the deteriorating condition of the Hornibrook Bridge and the cost to maintain it, most of the bridge was demolished in 2010 with only the southern portal remaining at the Brighton end and the northern portal and a small section of the bridge (following some reconstruction) remaining at the Clontarf end; both are available for recreational use.

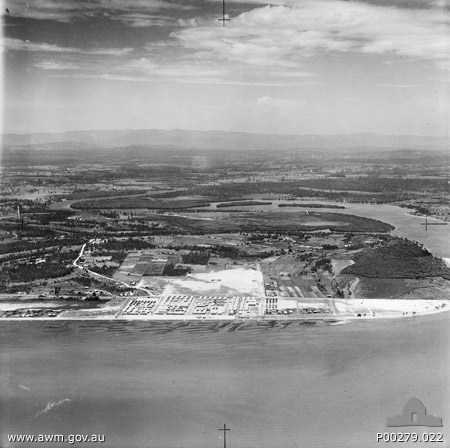
RAAF Station Sandgate, 1944

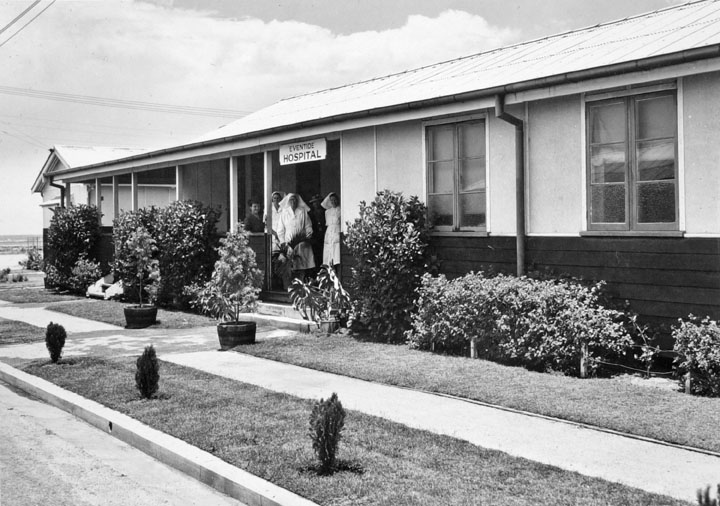
Eventide Hospital, 1947

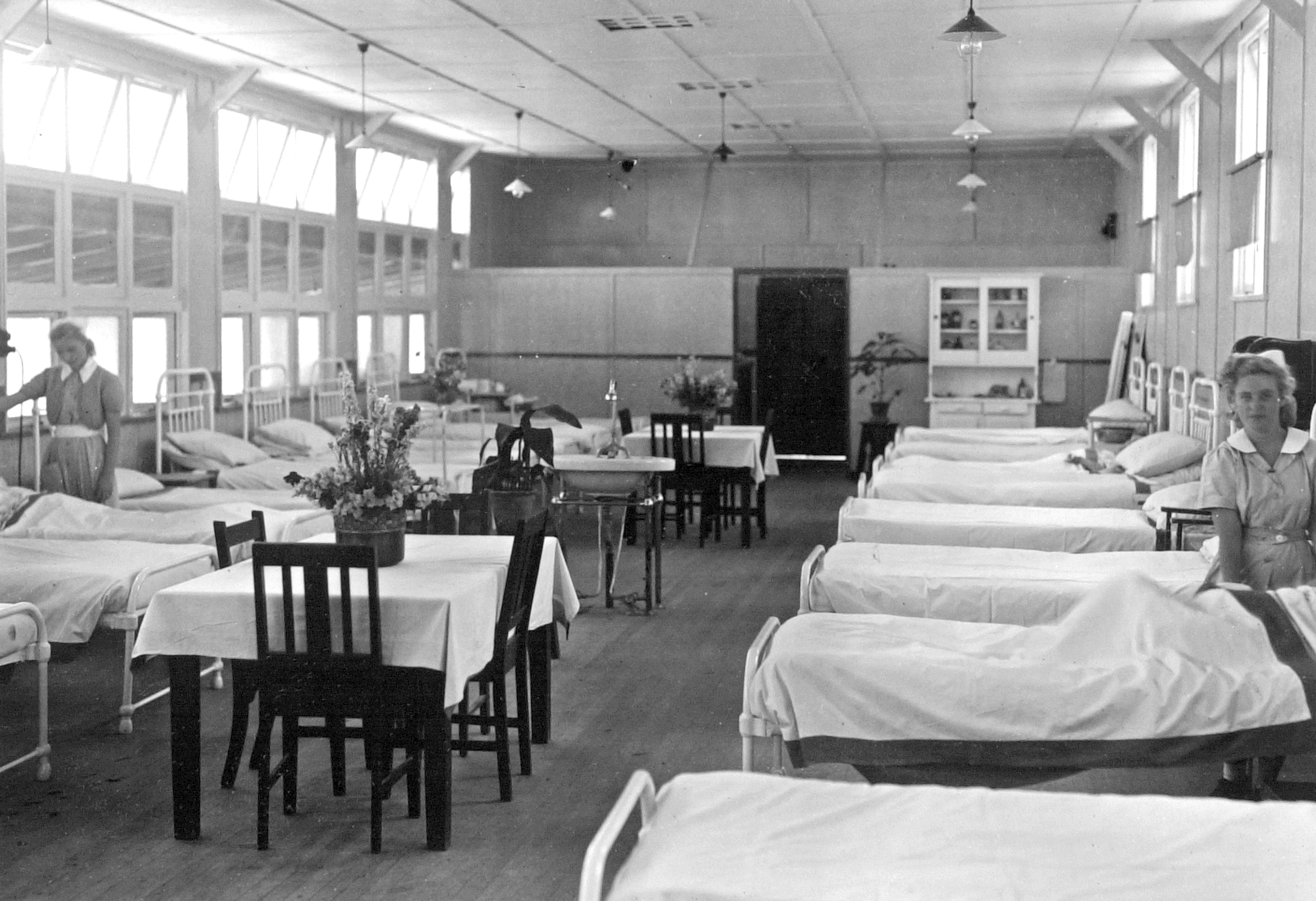
Inside Eventide Home, 1949

Brighton was the site of the Second World War barracks of the RAAF Air Training School between December 1940 and May 1946; it was built on reclaimed land. It later became Eventide, a large nursing home run by the Queensland Government. More than 700 patients were transferred from Dunwich on North Stradbroke Island to the facility. It was announced in late 2012 that the nursing home would close because the government did not wish to continue to provide aged care facilities. The site was redeveloped as the Brighton Health Campus, which provides a range of rehabilitation services and some aged care.

Brighton Baptist church at 77 North Road (27.2946°S 153.0553°E) opened in 1958. It is now in private ownership and has been converted into a residence.

Nashville State School opened on 25 January 1960.

St Kieran's Catholic School opened on 2 February 1960.

In June 1990 the Uniting Church in Australia congregations of Boondall, Brighton, Sandgate and Shorncliffe decided to amalgamate. Their new Sandgate Uniting Church in Deagon was opened in Sunday 20 November 1994.

The Autism Therapy & Education Centre opened on 27 January 1991.

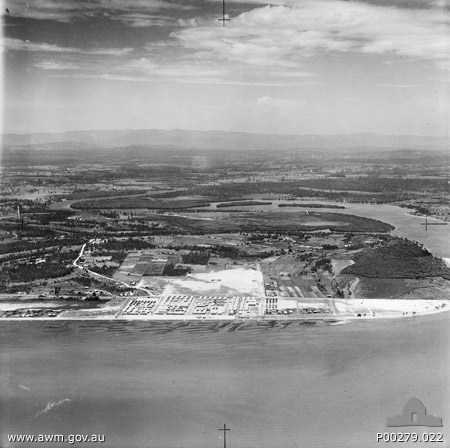
RAAF Station Sandgate, 1944

== Demographics ==
In the 2011 census, Brighton recorded a population of 9,012 people, 51.1% female and 48.9% male. The median age of the Brighton population was 40 years of age, 3 years above the Australian median. 78.4% of people living in Brighton were born in Australia, compared to the national average of 69.8%; the next most common countries of birth were England 5.3%, New Zealand 4.3%, Scotland 0.8%, Philippines 0.6%, Ireland 0.5%. 91.4% of people spoke only English at home; the next most popular languages were 0.5% German, 0.3% French, 0.3% Italian, 0.2% Tagalog, 0.2% Cantonese.

In the 2016 census, Brighton had a population of 9,479 people.

In the 2021 census, Brighton had a population of 9,664 people.

In the 2026 census, Brighton has an estimate population of 10,241, increasing roughly 0.6% and a difference of 577 since 2021. The full 2026 census is not currently released yet.

== Heritage listings ==
Brighton has a number of heritage-listed sites, including:

- Hornibrook Bridge (mostly demolished in 2011), Hornibrook Highway
- Ex-RAAF barracks (on the site of Brighton Health Campus)

== Education ==
Brighton State School is a government primary (Prep–6) school for boys and girls on the corner of North Road and Holmes Street/2 North Road (27.2942°S 153.0512°E). In 2018, the school had an enrolment of 435 students with 32 teachers (27 full-time equivalent) and 21 non-teaching staff (12 full-time equivalent).

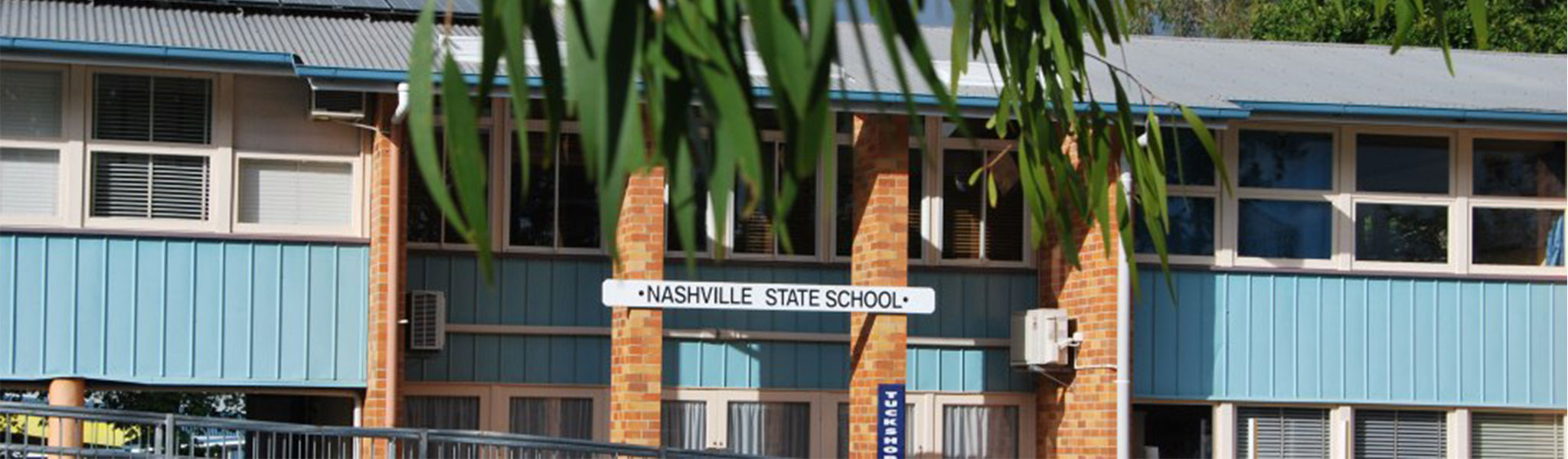
Nashville State School, 2024

Nashville State School is a government primary (Prep–6) school for boys and girls on the corner of Baskerville and Douglas Streets (27.3070°S 153.0503°E). In 2018, the school had an enrolment of 352 students with 26 teachers (23 full-time equivalent) and 18 non-teaching staff (11 full-time equivalent).

St Kieran's Catholic School is a Catholic primary (Prep–6) school for boys and girls at 15 Greenwood Street (27.2935°S 153.0551°E). In 2018, the school had an enrolment of 277 students with 23 teachers (17 full-time equivalent) and 18 non-teaching staff (9 full-time equivalent).

Autism Queensland Education & Therapy Centre is a private primary and secondary (Prep–12) facility of Autism Queensland Education & Therapy Centre (headquartered at Sunnybank Hills) at 136 North Road (27.2937°S 153.0577°E).

There are no government secondary schools in Brighton. The nearest government secondary school is Bracken Ridge State High School in neighbouring Bracken Ridge to the south-west, following Sandgate District State High School.

== Amenities ==
Brighton Health Campus is at 29 Nineteenth Avenue (27.29016°S 153.06353°E).

Brighton is serviced by a fortnightly visit of the Brisbane City Council's mobile library service in the car park at Decker Park on 25th Avenue.

There are a number of parks in the suburb, including:

- Beaconsfield Terrace Park (nos. 346 & 344) (27.2977°S 153.0611°E)
- Brighton Park (27.2825°S 153.0606°E)
- Decker Park (27.2856°S 153.0638°E)
- Dianella Reserve (27.3000°S 153.0539°E)
- Goodenia Reserve (27.3037°S 153.0575°E)
- Gordon Street Park (27.3037°S 153.0490°E)
- High Street Park (no.140) (27.2970°S 153.0601°E)
- High Street Park (nos.132&134) (27.2964°S 153.0587°E)
- Jill Street Park (27.2903°S 153.0590°E)
- Massie Street Park (27.3079°S 153.0582°E)
- North Road Park (27.2948°S 153.0520°E)
- Pimelea Reserve (27.2974°S 153.0567°E)
- Pomona Street Park (27.2913°S 153.0513°E)
- Princess Street Park (no.23) (27.2966°S 153.0617°E)
- Princess Street Park (nos.8–18) (27.2960°S 153.0607°E)
- Queens Parade Park (27.2997°S 153.0563°E)
- Queens Parade Park (no.93) (27.3005°S 153.0585°E)
- Sandgate Foreshores Park (27.3028°S 153.0657°E)
- Sandgate Third Lagoon Reserve (27.3103°S 153.0522°E)
- Saul Street Park (27.3085°S 153.0577°E)
- Shepherd Street Park (no.2) (27.2975°S 153.0620°E)
- Stubbs Street Park (27.3031°S 153.0617°E)
- Tenth Avenue Park (27.3064°S 153.0648°E)
- Townsend Street Park (27.2986°S 153.0587°E)
- Townsend Street Park (nos.31&12) (27.2998°S 153.0584°E)
- Wakefield Park (27.3014°S 153.0500°E)

== Sport & recreation ==
Brighton is a suburb with a range of sporting activities and recreation in its culture.

=== Brighton District Football Club ===
Brighton District Football Club (also known as Brighton Bulldogs FC) is a soccer club at Wakefield Park, Wickham Street. (-27.3020193, 153.0492952)

=== Brighton Roosters JRL ===
Brighton Roosters JRL (formerly known as North Brighton Junior Rugby League Club) is a Rugby League Club at 22 Tenth Avenue, Brighton (-27.3071918, 153.0649899)

Additionally to the Brighton Roosters JRL Club, a Brighton Roosters Softball is hosted Bracken Ridge State High School for Children and Adults every Wednesday.

=== School Sports ===
Brighton State School is mostly known for its Touch Academy that go to Brisbane & Queensland All Primary Schools and their Soccer & Mini-Kickers Academy. Nashville State School runs a Sports-X program featuring Soccer, Basketball and AFL. Both schools also host a swimming program in Term 3 - 4, and both schools are invited to the annual Bay Cup Competition at Bracken Ridge State High School.

== Attractions ==
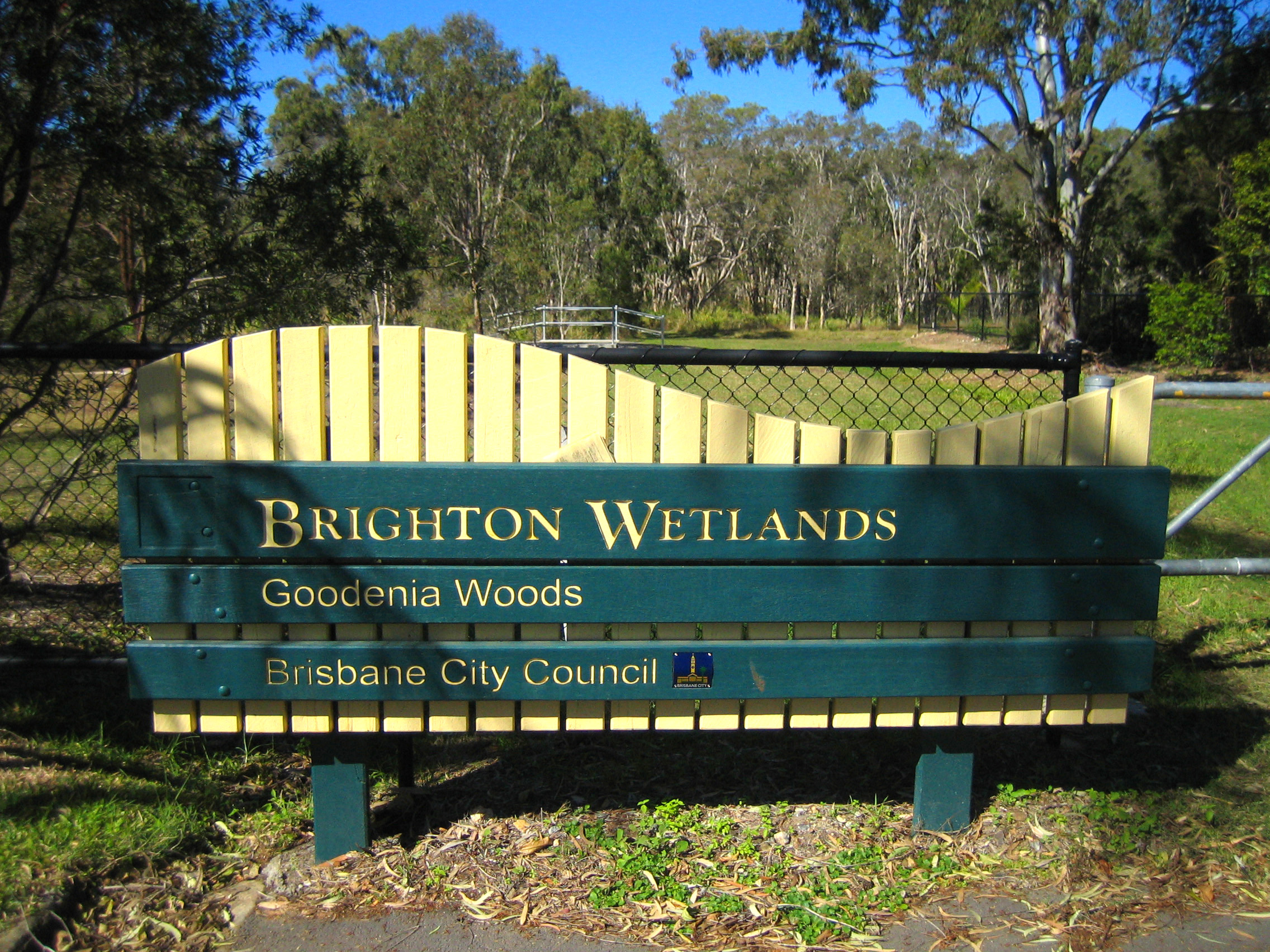
Brighton Wetlands' Speight Street Entrance

=== Brighton Wetlands ===
Brighton has a woodland wetland protected by the local government. This natural reserve is made up of three woods; namely Goodenia Woods, Pimelea Woods and Dianella Woods. The land is so called a wetland as it fills with water during heavy rain which flows into a small tidal creek, Copold Creek, that flows under one of the main roads of Brighton, Beaconsfield Terrace, and then leads to Bramble Bay between 15th and 16th Avenues.

=== Brighton Esplanade ===
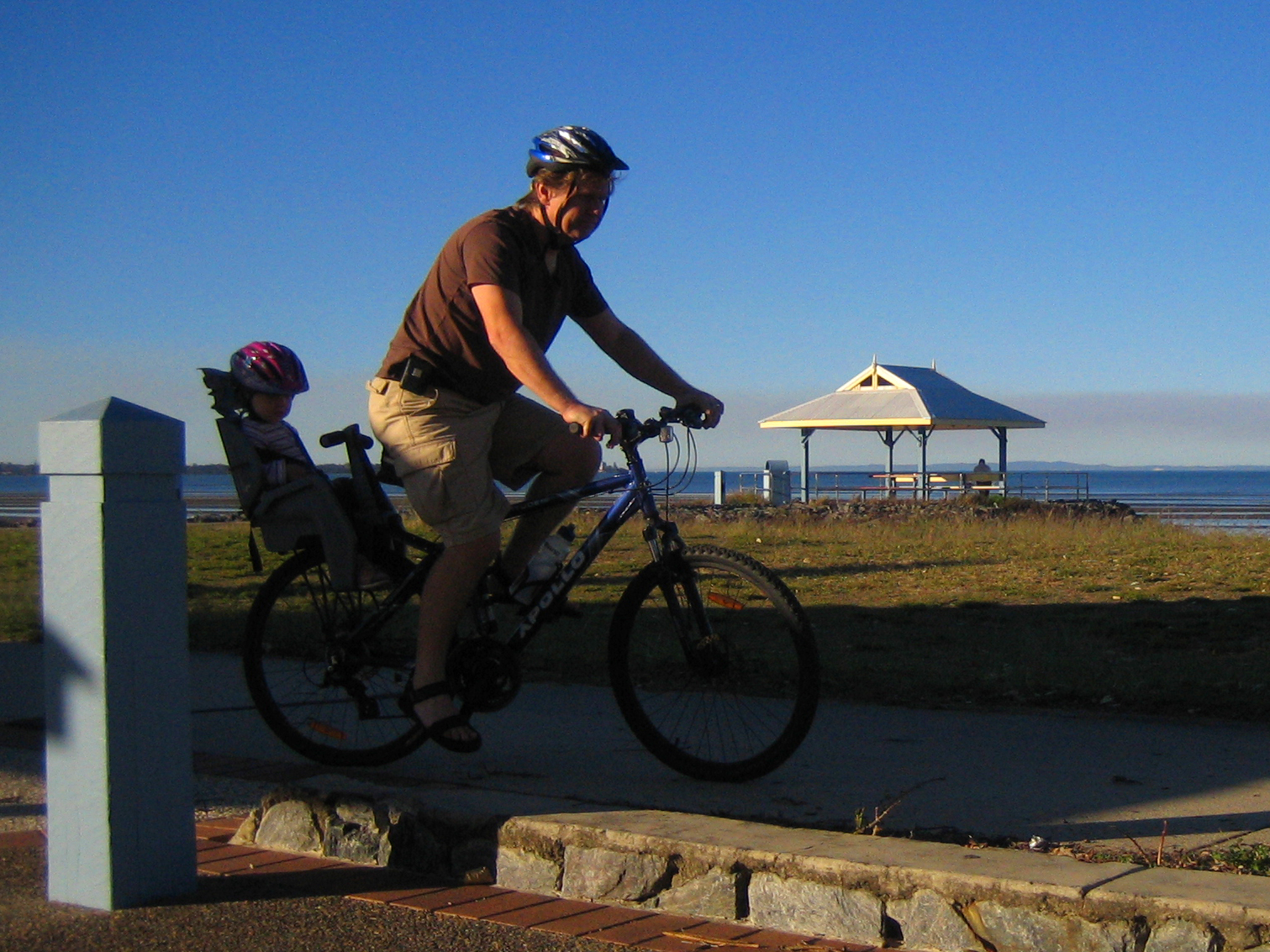
A cyclist enjoying Brighton Esplanade

Brighton is a desirable Brisbane suburb due to both the ease of public transport, such as the train service from nearby Sandgate, and also the bayside esplanade. This peaceful parkland esplanade follows the coast between the Houghton Highway bridge and Sandgate. The esplanade is used by walkers, cyclists and families. Brighton's beach is used by kite surfers and also walkers during low tide. The road that follows the esplanade is called Flinders Parade named after the navigator Captain Matthew Flinders who was the first European to discover the area in order to establish a penal colony for Lord Brisbane, Governor of New South Wales.

== See also ==
- Redcliffe Peninsula road network
