= Ted Smout Memorial Bridge =

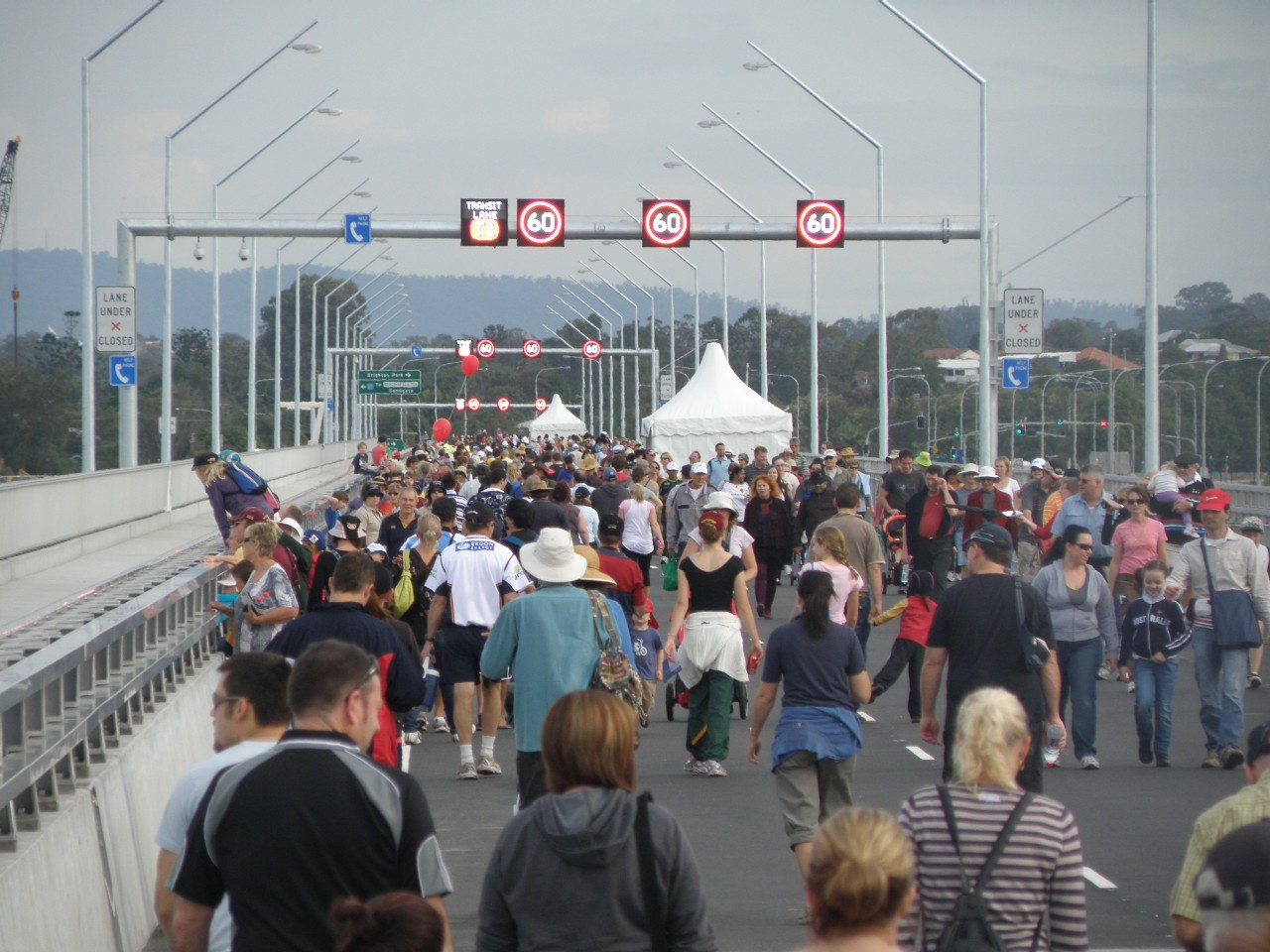
- Bridge Walk, part of opening celebrations on 11 July 2010
- Coordinates: 27.27871°S 153.067623°E
- Carries: 3 lanes, 1 footpath
- Crosses: Bramble Bay, Hays Inlet, Pine River
- Locale: Redcliffe (Clontarf) north end, Brisbane (Brighton) south end, Queensland, Australia
- Official name: Ted Smout Memorial Bridge
- Maintained by: Department of Transport and Main Roads

Characteristics
- Design: Reinforced concrete viaduct
- Total length: 2,740 m (8,990 ft)

History
- Designer: KBR Pty Ltd
- Constructed by: Hull-Albem Joint Venture
- Construction cost: $315 million
- Opened: 11 July 2010; 16 years ago

Location
- Interactive map of Ted Smout Memorial Bridge

The Ted Smout Memorial Bridge is a 2.74 kilometre-long road and pedestrian bridge in Brisbane, Australia, and the third such bridge to cross Hays Inlet in Bramble Bay (the first crossing being the demolished Hornibrook Bridge). It is located 30 metres to the east of the Houghton Highway (which provides the northbound lanes), providing 3 southbound traffic lanes and a bi-directional pedestrian and bicycle path. It connects the Redcliffe suburb of Clontarf with the Brisbane suburb of Brighton, and was opened by the then-Queensland Premier Anna Bligh on 11 July 2010. The Ted Smout Memorial Bridge (and the adjacent Houghton bridge) were Australia's longest bridges until 27 March 2013, when the Macleay River Bridge opened in Kempsey, NSW.

The bridge consists of 78 spans, each 35 m long. The cost of the bridge was A$315 million. It was built 4 m higher than the Houghton bridge, in order to improve its resilience to storm surges. It is the first bridge in Australia designed to withstand Hurricane Katrina-type cyclonic events. It is also possibly the only Australian bridge which may have to deal with shallow water storm surge.

The bridge features

- 3 traffic lanes (originally 2 for regular traffic and a T2 (bus, taxi and vehicles with more than 2 occupants) lane, but the T2 lane has now been converted to a regular lane).
- A 4.5 m (15 ft) wide pedestrian and cycle path that connects footpath and cycle networks on either side of Bramble Bay. The path is separated from traffic by a concrete barrier.
- A fishing platform near the Pine River channel. The platform measures 10 m by 50 m.

== Naming ==
The bridge is named 'Ted Smout Memorial Bridge' after Ted Smout, Queensland's last surviving World War One veteran, who lived in Sandgate and died in 2004. The naming ceremony by Craig Wallace, the then Queensland Minister for Main Roads, took place on 14 July 2009 as part of Queensland's 150th birthday celebrations. The ceremony also marked the construction of the middle (39th) span of the new bridge.

== History ==
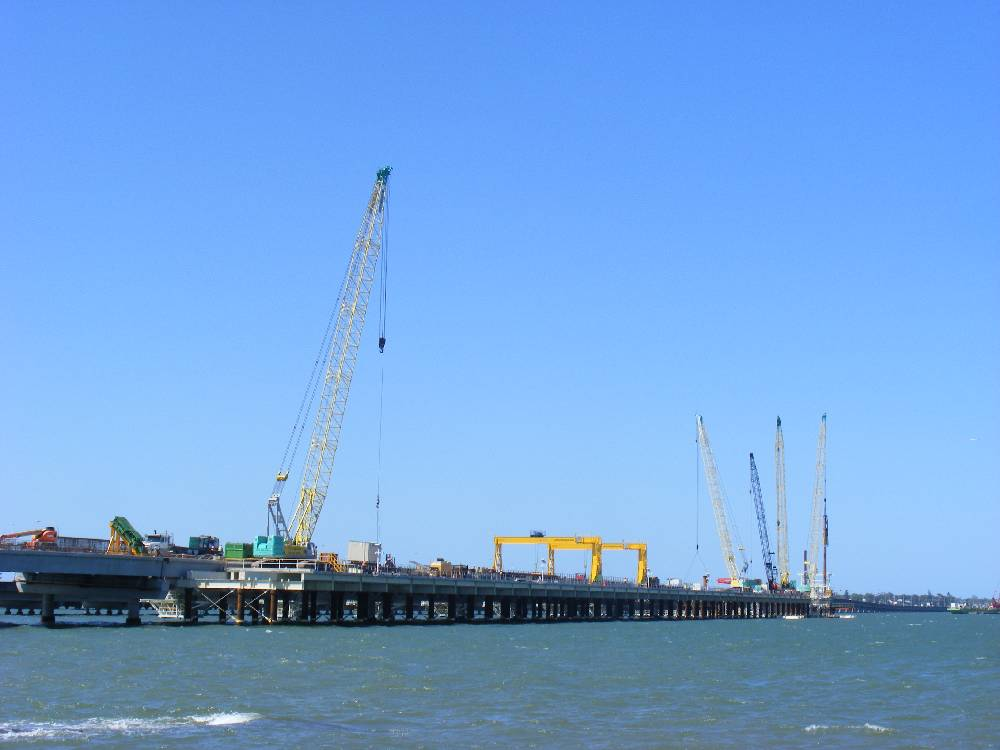
Construction of bridge in November 2008

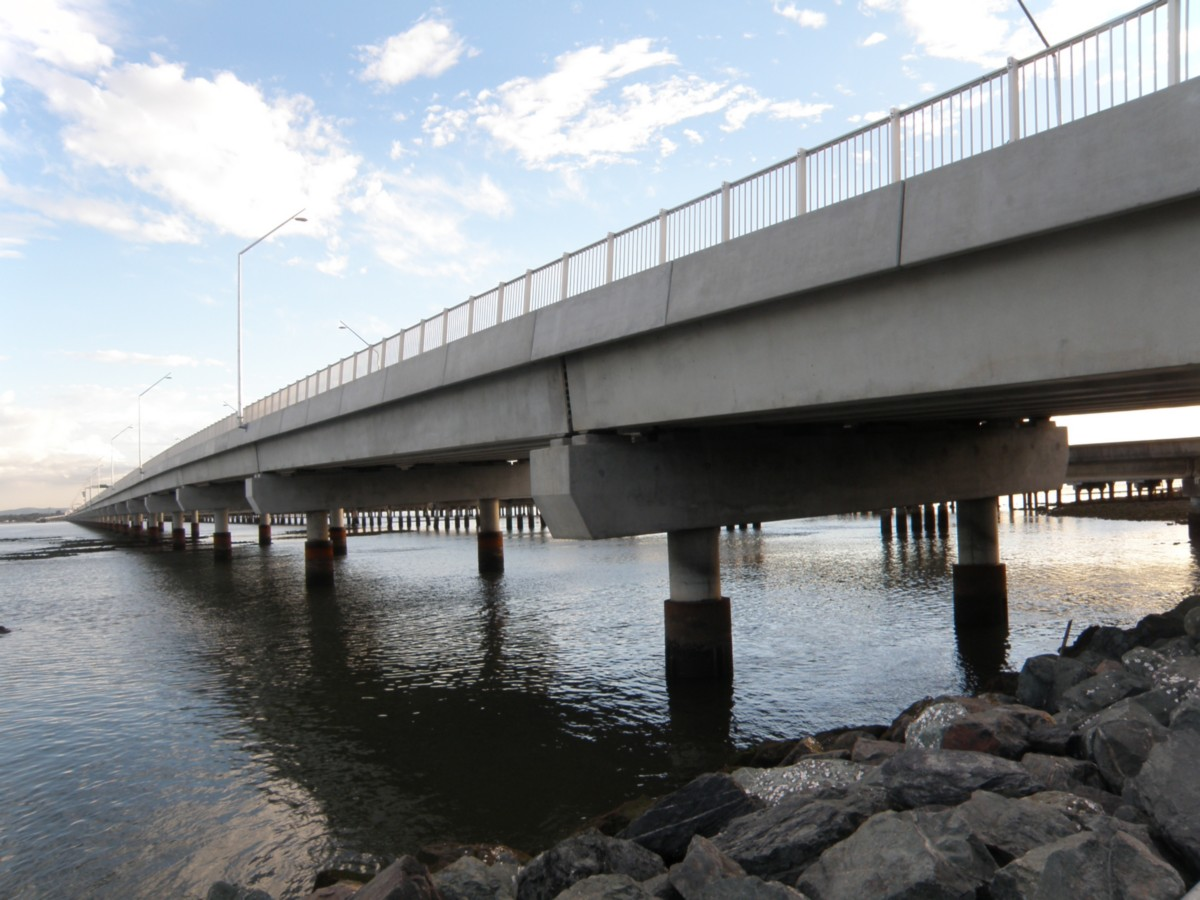
View of new bridge from Clontarf shore

The Houghton Highway bridge was originally built to duplicate the Hornibrook Bridge. However, the refurbishment of the original bridge proved to be uneconomic, and the Houghton bridge was converted to 3 lanes with peak flow lane control. When this reached capacity, another 3 lane bridge was proposed to be built between the Hornibrook and Houghton bridges, at the same height as the latter.

After the original design was finalised, bridges of similar design were extensively damaged by storm surges caused by Hurricane Katrina, and it was necessary to redesign the bridge to be storm-surge resilient, involving raising the deck level by 4 metres. The revised design is distinctly different from the original plan, which was for a similar structure to the Houghton bridge. Its location was shifted to the east side of the Houghton bridge in order to provide it with some level of storm surge protection

Increases in the cost of construction materials and labour, changes to the scope of the project following technical investigations and community consultation, extra costs associated with the removal of the Hornibrook bridge, as well as design improvements spurred by the events of Hurricane Katrina meant the total cost increased to $315 million, compared with the $149 million estimated in 2004. The preliminary design went on display in June 2007.

A falsework platform was used and continually relocated as construction of the bridge segments progressed. Foundation piles were driven up to 39 metres into the sea bed, which were then reinforced with concrete and capped with concrete headstock and girders. The bridge was then fitted with concrete barriers, guard rails and electrical conduit. The southern and northern abutment of the bridge included land reclamation works involving a seawall and embankment.

Construction began in April 2008 and the entire duplication works were completed on 19 August 2011.

=== Milestones ===
- Late 2005 – Initial community consultation
- 2006 – Options investigation and development of project concepts
- Mid 2007 – Community consultation on project plans
- Late 2007 – Finalisation of project plans and construction tender period
- Early 2009 – Construction works commence at Brighton
- Mid 2008 – Construction works commence at Clontarf Point
- Mid 2008 – Bridge construction works commence
- August 2008 – Bridge reaches middle or 39th span
- December 2009 – Last of the bridge piles and headstocks completed
- 14 January 2010 – Final 82 tonne bridge girder was erected
- 19 January 2010 – Last concrete deck slab was poured
- 11 July 2010 – Official opening, bridge opening celebrations and community day
- 14 July 2010 – Opening of the new bridge to pedestrians and cyclists
- 15 July 2010 – Opening of the new bridge to southbound (Brisbane-bound) traffic
- August 2010 – Commence resurfacing and upgrading of the existing Houghton Highway bridge
- August 2010 – Commence demolition and partial rebuilding of the old Hornibrook Bridge
- August 2011 – All project works completed

== See also ==
- Road transport in Brisbane
- Redcliffe Peninsula road network
