= Redcliffe Peninsula road network =

Redcliffe Peninsula road network is a group of roads that provide access to the Redcliffe Peninsula in Queensland, Australia, and enable travel between the contained communities. The area serviced by the network includes the localities of Clontarf, Kippa-Ring, Margate, Newport, Redcliffe, Rothwell, Scarborough and Woody Point.

The area hosts a substantial residential community plus many tourism accommodation venues. The estimated population for the area described as the Former Redcliffe Peninsula District as at 30 June 2021 was 64,366.

== Roads in the network ==
The network consists of the following state-controlled roads:

- Brighton–Redcliffe Road (see below for component bridges and roads)
- Clontarf–Anzac Avenue Road (Elizabeth Avenue, Snook Street)
- Deception Bay Road
- Redcliffe Road (Anzac Avenue)

A number of local roads that also link the localities are not included in this article.

== Brighton–Redcliffe Road ==
Brighton–Redcliffe Road
- Location: Deagon Deviation and Beaconsfield Terrace, Brighton to Klingner Road, Redcliffe
- Length: 9.8 km (6.1 mi)
- Route number: 27

This road has the following components:

- Houghton Highway (northbound)
- Ted Smout Memorial Bridge (southbound)
- Hornibrook Esplanade
- Oxley Avenue

Brighton–Redcliffe Road is a state-controlled road (number 122), part regional and part district, rated as a local road of regional significance (LRRS). It carries traffic from Brighton, via Clontarf, Woody Point and Margate, to Redcliffe, a distance of 9.8 kilometres (6.1 mi). All of this road is part of State Route 27.

The road starts at the intersection of the Deagon Deviation (State Route 26) and Beaconsfield Terrace (State Route 27) in Brighton. It runs north-east across Bramble Bay, over the Houghton Highway (northbound) and the Ted Smout Memorial Bridge (southbound), to Clontarf. It passes the exit to Clontarf–Anzac Avenue Road (Elizabeth Avenue) and continues north-east and east as Hornibrook Esplanade to Woody Point, where the name changes to Oxley Avenue as it turns north.

Continuing north the road passes through Margate and enters Redcliffe, crossing Redcliffe Road (Anzac Avenue) and reaching Klingner Road, where it ends. Oxley Avenue continues north as State Route 27. Each bridge carries three lanes of traffic, and most of the road is a divided four lane carriageway.

=== Oxley Avenue safety works ===
A project to provide safety works at five intersections in Redcliffe, three of which are on Oxley Avenue, was underway at March 2022.

=== Major intersections (Brighton–Redcliffe Road) ===
All distances are from Google Maps. The road commences in the Brisbane local government area (LGA) but all other intersections are within the Moreton Bay LGA.

Location	km	mi	Destinations	Notes
Brighton	0	0.0	Deagon Deviation – southwest – Deagon; Beaconsfield Terrace – south – Sandgate	Southern end of Brighton–Redcliffe Road (State Route 27). The road starts in the Brisbane LGA and crosses Bramble Bay to the Moreton Bay LGA. It uses the Houghton Highway northbound and the Ted Smout Memorial Bridge southbound.
Clontarf	3.1	1.9	Clontarf–Anzac Avenue Road – north (as Elizabeth Avenue) – Kippa-Ring	Road continues north east as Hornibrook Esplanade.
Woody Point	5.8	3.6	Oxley Avenue – south – Woody Point	Road continues north as Oxley Avenue (State Route 27)
Redcliffe	9.0	5.6	Redcliffe Road (Anzac Avenue) – west – Kippa-Ring – east – Redcliffe	Road continues north.
Redcliffe	9.8	6.1	Klingner Road – west – Kippa-Ring – east – Redcliffe	Northern end of Brighton–Redcliffe Road (State Route 27) Oxley Avenue continues north as State Route 27.
1.000 mi = 1.609 km; 1.000 km = 0.621 mi: Route transition

== Clontarf–Anzac Avenue Road ==
Clontarf–Anzac Avenue Road
- Location: Brighton-Redcliffe Road, Clontarf to Redcliffe Road (Anzac Avenue), Kippa-Ring
- Length: 4.1 km (2.5 mi)
- Route number: 26

Clontarf–Anzac Avenue Road is a state-controlled regional road (number 123), rated as a local road of regional significance (LRRS) It runs from Clontarf to Kippa-Ring, a distance of 4.1 kilometres (2.5 mi). The road starts as Elizabeth Avenue, becomes Snook Street for a distance, and continues as Elizabeth Avenue. It is part of State Route 26. This is a four lane divided road. There are no major intersections on this road.

=== New overpass ===
Construction of an active transport overpass across Elizabeth Avenue was expected to be complete in mid-2023.

== Deception Bay Road ==
Deception Bay Road
- Location: Old Gympie Road, Burpengary to Redcliffe Road (Anzac Avenue), Rothwell
- Length: 8.1 km (5.0 mi)
- Route number: 26

Deception Bay Road is a state-controlled regional road (number 121), rated as a local road of regional significance (LRRS) It runs from Burpengary, via Deception Bay, to Rothwell, a distance of 8.1 kilometres (5.0 mi). The road is part of State Route 26. Apart from the Bruce Highway, which it crosses as it leaves Burpengary and enters Deception Bay, there are no major intersections on this road. Part of this road is a four lane divided carriageway.

=== New bridges ===
Two new bridges, to carry Deception Bay Road over the Bruce Highway, were under construction from 2020.

=== Upgrade planning ===
A preferred planning layout for the upgrade of a section of Deception Bay Road to four lanes has been released for community consultation.

== Redcliffe Road ==
Redcliffe Road (Anzac Avenue)
- Location: Brisbane–Woodford Road, Petrie to Redcliffe Parade / Marine Parade, Redcliffe
- Length: 17.8 km (11.1 mi)
- Route number: 71

Redcliffe Road is the official name for the road known as Anzac Avenue. It is a state-controlled road (number 120), part regional and part district, rated as a local road of regional significance (LRRS) It runs from Petrie, via Kallangur, North Lakes, Mango Hill, Rothwell and Kippa-Ring to Redcliffe, a distance of 17.8 kilometres (11.1 mi). The road is signed as State Route 71. Within the Redcliffe Peninsula the road intersects with Deception Bay Road in Rothwell, Clontarf–Anzac Avenue Road in Kippa-Ring, and Brighton–Redcliffe Road in Redcliffe. All of this road is at least a four lane divided carriageway.

=== Anzac Avenue safety works ===
A project to provide safety works at five intersections in Redcliffe, two of which are on Anzac Avenue, was underway at March 2022.

== History ==
The first road to the Redcliffe Peninsula was an Aboriginal track used to access a prominent bora ring at what is now Kippa-Ring. A road from Bald Hills to Redcliffe was formed by the early 1860s, but it was not maintained. A better road was surveyed and built in the early 1870s. Anzac Memorial Avenue (as it was originally named) was opened in 1925 as a fully sealed road.

The Hornibrook Bridge, the first crossing of Bramble Bay, was opened in 1935. This was duplicated by the Houghton Highway in 1979. The Ted Smout Memorial Bridge was opened in 2010. With this opening the Hornibrook Bridge was closed in preparation for demolition.
