= 2026 Australian census =

Nineteenth census of Australia
- 11 August 2026; 2 months ago

General information
- Country: Australia
- Topics: Census topics: Location; Sex and gender; Households and families; Population; Income and work; Health; Education and training; Transport; Cultural diversity; Religion
- Trial census: 5 August 2025
- Authority: Australian Bureau of Statistics
- Website: www.abs.gov.au/census/2026-census-topic-review

The 2026 Australian census was the nineteenth national Census of Population and Housing in Australia. The 2026 census took place on 11 August 2026, and was conducted by the Australian Bureau of Statistics (ABS).

Results from the 2026 census are scheduled to be released in three stages, with the first release containing the majority of the data taking place in June 2027, and the second and third releases to happen in October 2027 and "early to mid-2028" respectively.

== Topics ==
In December 2023, the ABS proposed a number of changes to census topics and questions. Following a two-year public consultation process, they announced that they had shortlisted for further testing and development five new topics, plus modifications to the questions used for 12 existing topics. The proposed new topics were:

- Aboriginal and Torres Strait Islander cultural identity
- the main reason for moving house in the last 12 months
- gender, including a non-binary option
- sexual orientation
- variations of sex characteristics

The numerous changes to question design included changes to the religious affiliation to remove the leading nature of the question so as "to support more accurate data collection".

According to documents obtained under Freedom of Information laws, the federal government failed to meet ABS deadlines during 2024 to provide confirmation of the topics that it wanted included in the 2026 census. On 23 August 2024, the government confirmed in writing to the ABS, in an attempt to avoid "divisive debate" over LGBTIQ issues, that it wanted to keep the same topics as the 2021 census.

Because of the missed deadline, the ABS cancelled a critical major test that was scheduled for September 2024. This major test was to be a rehearsal of all the new topics and questions that the ABS had proposed to include in the 2026 census, with test forms expected to reach up to 50,000 households. In particular, the test had been critical to determining the performance of the proposed new religion question.

The government's decision resulted in a public backlash, with LGBTIQ advocacy groups particularly concerned that promised new topics and questions about sexuality and gender identity would be left out of the 2026 census. The government soon backed down and announced it would include a question on sexual orientation.

In late 2025, the ABS confirmed that the 2026 census would include new questions on gender and sexual orientation. It also made changes to several existing questions to improve data quality and ensure inclusivity. These include: allowing respondents to report up to four ancestries; enhancing the third response option on the sex recorded at birth question; and updating the wording of the country of birth of parents questions. The number of children a woman has given birth to would not be asked at the 2026 census; it would change to be asked only once per decade.

=== Religion question ===
In July 2023, following phase 1 of its public consultation process, the ABS announced that the religion question would be among the topics it would consider for change after receiving overwhelming feedback from the public that the existing question "What is the person's religion?" assumes you have a religion.

In late 2023, at the end of the two-year public consultation process, the ABS announced that it was proposing to change the census religion question to address the leading nature of the existing question. The ABS stated it would test a newly worded question "Does the person have a religion?" in order to "support more accurate data collection". The feedback obtained from the public during the consultation processes overwhelmingly supported changing the question to remove the risk of bias.

In early 2024, after learning of the ABS' plan to change the design of the religion question, the Catholic Church mounted a public campaign that called on the government to intervene, arguing that the churches needed comparability of data with past censuses, and that the changes would create a "new bias" in favour of "no religion". As revealed in documents obtained under freedom of information (FOI) laws, the Australian Catholic Bishops Conference also directly asked Prime Minister Anthony Albanese to reverse the proposal.

FOI documents also show that, in a private briefing of the government in May 2024, the ABS rejected the church's concerns, including the claim that there was a need for maintaining comparability with past censuses. Internally, the ABS was of the view that comparability needed to be "balanced against changes to improve accuracy, relevance and inclusivity". The ABS told the government that updates to the religion question were required for a number of reasons, including to "better reflect the diversity of the Australian community and address concerns regarding quality of data with the existing question". The ABS also released a public clarification to counter claims being made in media reports about the proposed changes to the census religion question.

The ABS then launched a new round of consultations with religious groups. In early June 2024, the head of the ABS, David Gruen, told senate estimates there would be a new round of consultations with religious groups and that the ABS would make a decision on the religion question later in the year "on the basis of the evidence that we get from the test and from consultations that we have with religious groups".

Following the government's failure to meet ABS deadlines and then the resultant decision to cancel the major September test – which had been viewed as critical to assessing the performance of the religion question – ABS executives decided to abandon the new question design and revert to using the existing question. According to an internal email, they made the decision to retain the 2021 questioning wording "as this maximises comparability and we could not quantify the impact of question wording change without extensive testing". FOI documents also show that, when ABS executives made the decision at a meeting on 3 October 2024, a slide presentation acknowledged that the wording of the existing religion question "may lead respondents to a particular response".

Several surveys have shown that the leading nature of the census religion question inflates the religion result, including a 2026 survey commissioned by the Census – Not religious? Mark 'no religion' campaign, which showed a non-religious undercount of over 10 percent.

== See also ==
- Demographics of Australia
- Population and housing censuses by country
- 2026 in Australia
