= Bramble Bay =

Coordinates: 27°18′S 153°06′E

Bramble
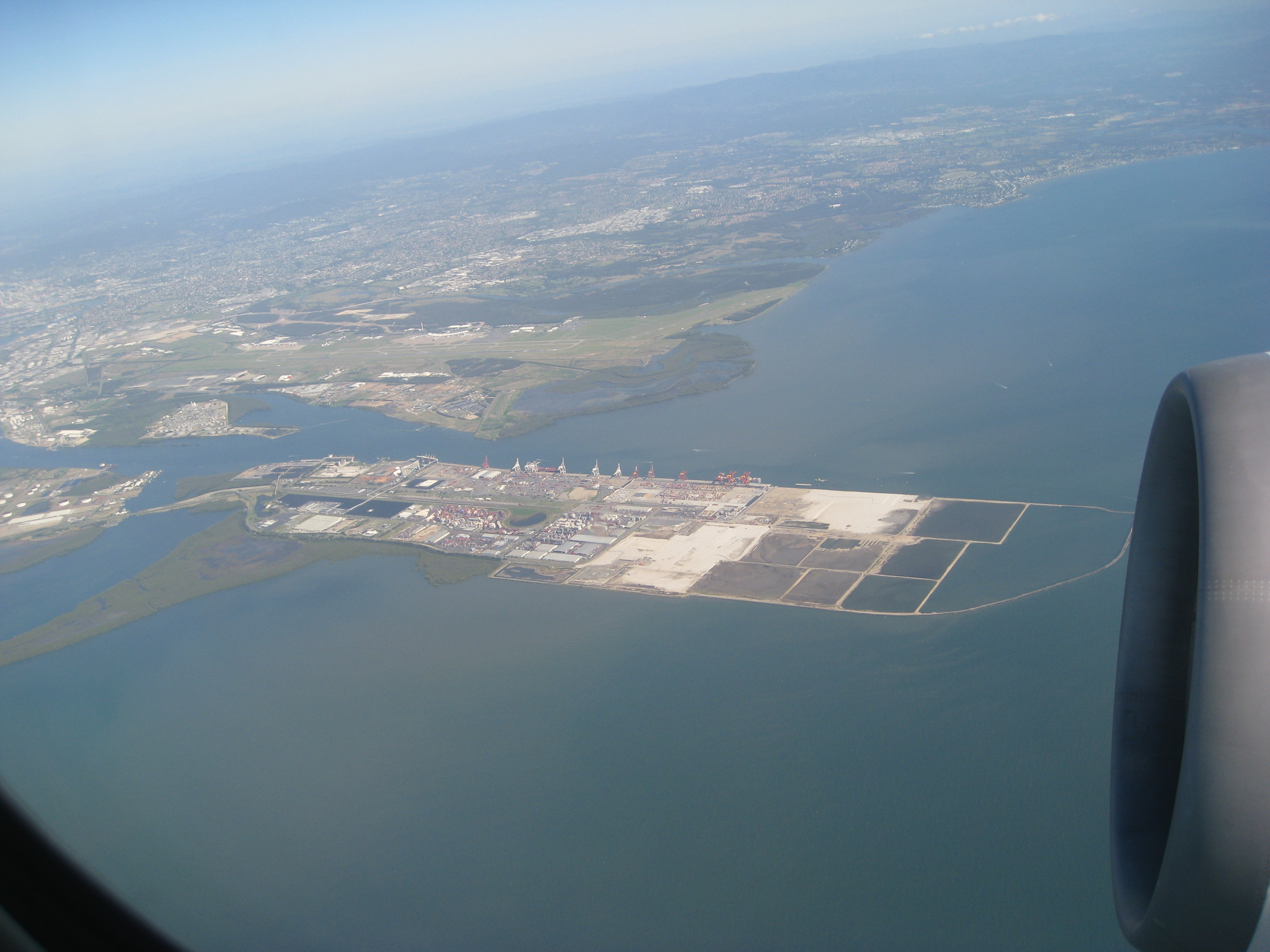
- Bramble Bay, 2009 (top-right of image)

Location
- Country: Australia
- State: Queensland
- Region: South East Queensland
- City: Brisbane

Basin features
- River system: Moreton Bay
- Tributaries
  - left: Brisbane River
  - right: Pine River

Bramble Bay is an embayment of Moreton Bay in South East Queensland, Australia. The Brisway map reference is 12 H5, or see page 91 G19 in Refidex.

The Houghton Highway, Hornibrook Bridge and Ted Smout Memorial Bridge span Bramble Bay, connecting Redcliffe with Brisbane.

Shorncliffe Pier

The Brisbane to Gladstone yacht race begins in Bramble Bay. Activities for the annual race are centred on the Shorncliffe pier and nearby foreshore.

Bramble Bay is the most environmentally degraded part of Moreton Bay. Because the bay is so close to the urban populations of Brisbane and Redcliffe the collection of shelled marine animals such as oysters, scallops and limpets is banned. Fishing within bay's closed waters, risks on the spot fines at all times under Queensland's closed water fishing regulations.

== Geography ==
North of Bramble Bay the shoreline forms the southern peninsula shape of the Redcliffe City suburbs of Clontarf and Woody Point. The southern shoreline follows Brisbane City suburbs of Brighton, Sandgate and the northern Shorncliffe shoreline. The former suburb of Cribb Island was also found on the southern shoreline of the bay until it was disbanded for the construction of the Brisbane Airport.

Bramble Bay flows into Hays Inlet to the north-west, and Pine River flows into Bramble Bay to the south-west. Some definitions place the mouth of the Brisbane River and the Boondall Wetlands in Bramble Bay. This would also place the mouths of a number of smaller creeks south of Shorncliffe, including Cabbage Tree Creek (formerly Tighgum Creek), Nundah Creek and Kedron Brook, within the Bramble Bay catchment.

== Water quality ==
Both rivers flowing into Bramble Bay carry high loads of nutrients and suspended sediments. Water in the bay is very turbid. At times two sewerage plumes from the rivers are visible in Bramble Bay. The residence time for Bramble Bay, that is, the period of time that a parcel of water remains at a particular location, is 59 to 62 days, the longest for any part of Moreton Bay.

In 2009, the annual Healthy Waterways Partnership Report Card rated Bramble Bay an F from a previous C. The rating deteriorated because of an increase in phytoplankton and nitrogen concentrations, as well as decreases in water clarity and salinity.

During the past the bay contained large areas of seagrass which attracted feeding dugongs, however there are no seagrass beds in the bay today. This is due to a lack of sunlight reaching the seabed.

== See also ==
- Moreton Bay Marine Park
- Redcliffe Peninsula road network
