= Houghton Highway =

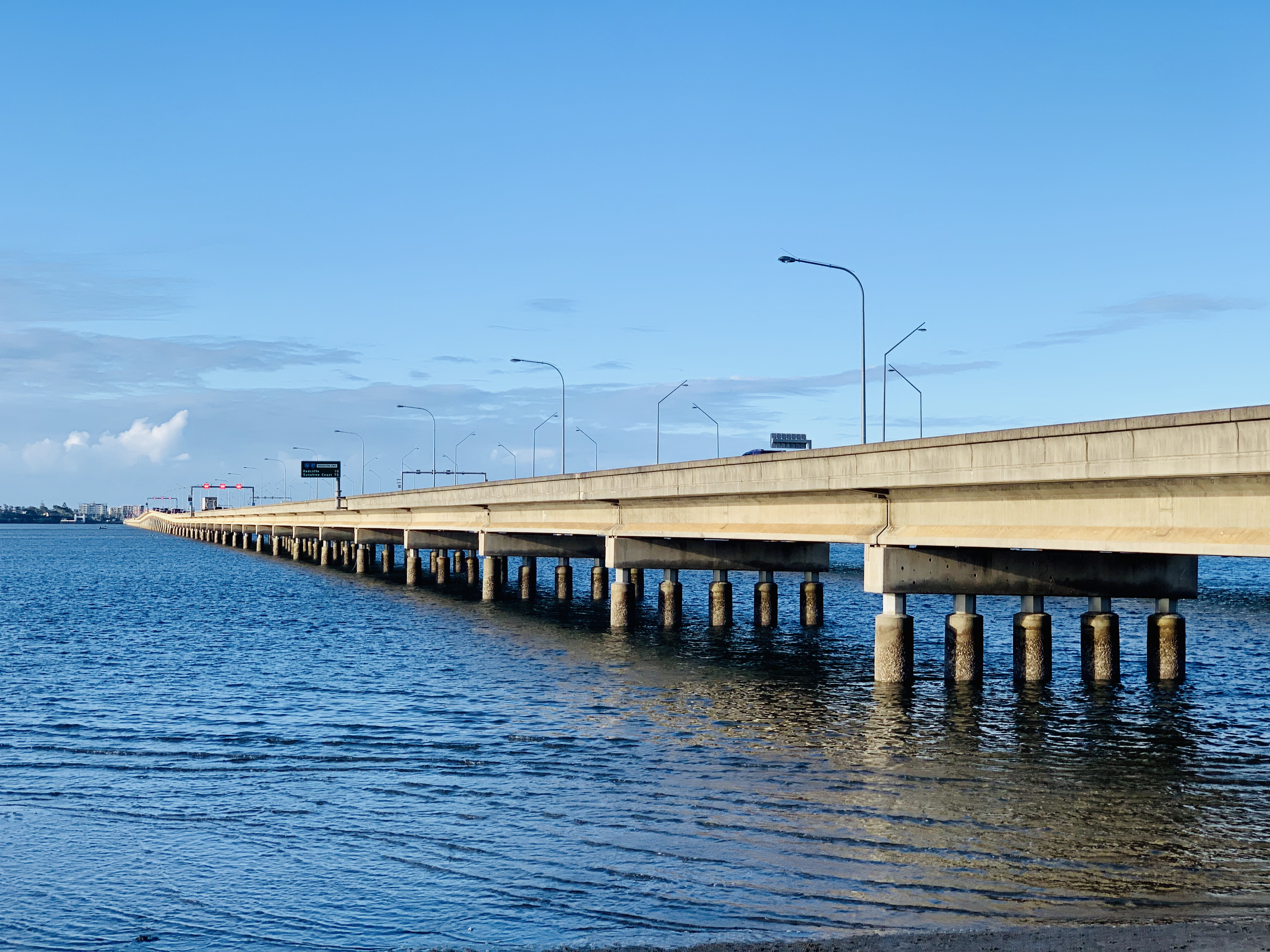
- Houghton Highway Bridge, 2019
- Coordinates: 27.27871°S 153.067623°E
- Carries: Motor vehicles, 3 lanes
- Crosses: Hays Inlet at Bramble Bay
- Locale: Redcliffe (Clontarf) north end, Brisbane (Brighton) south end, Queensland, Australia
- Official name: Houghton Highway
- Maintained by: Department of Transport and Main Roads

Characteristics
- Design: Reinforced concrete viaduct
- Total length: 2,740 m (8,990 ft)
- Width: 11.1 m (36 ft)

History
- Opened: 20 December 1979; 46 years ago

Location
- Interactive map of Houghton Highway

The Houghton Highway is a 2.74 km (1.70 mi) reinforced concrete viaduct, the second bridge to be built across Hays Inlet at Bramble Bay connecting the cities of Redcliffe and Brisbane in Queensland, Australia (the first bridge was the Hornibrook Bridge). The bridge, along with the third bridge, the Ted Smout Memorial Bridge, were the longest bridges in the country until 27 March 2013, when the Macleay River Bridge opened in Kempsey, NSW.

Originally built to duplicate the crossing capacity, almost immediately after opening it was converted to a three lane roadway with 'peak flow' lane control as a result of the proposed upgrading of the Hornibrook Bridge being deemed uneconomic. The intended crossing capacity was finally provided with the opening of the Ted Smout Memorial Bridge in 2010.

== History ==
With rising traffic levels on the two-lane Hornibrook Bridge in the 1970s, the Department of Main Roads investigated the construction of another structure to increase capacity and cope with future demand. Authorisation by the department was given to construct a new bridge in 1977, and the new Houghton Highway opened on 20 December 1979, by the then Premier of Queensland, The Hon Sir Joh Bjelke-Petersen.

The Houghton Highway is named after The Hon James 'Jim' Houghton, Member for Redcliffe (1960–1979) and speaker (1974–1979). Houghton resigned from parliament on 7 August, four months before the bridge opened.

== Design ==
The all-concrete Houghton Highway consists of 99 spans atop of some 400 T-beams, supported close to sea level by headstocks connected to five octagonal piles each.

=== Rough ride ===
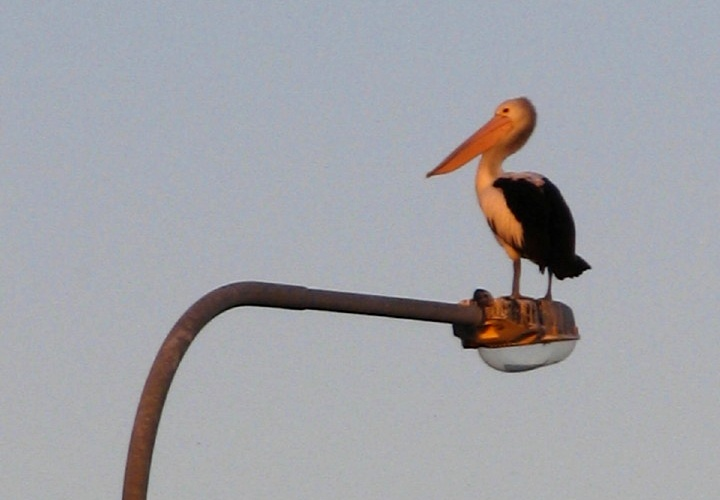
Roosting pelicans are an icon of the bridge...

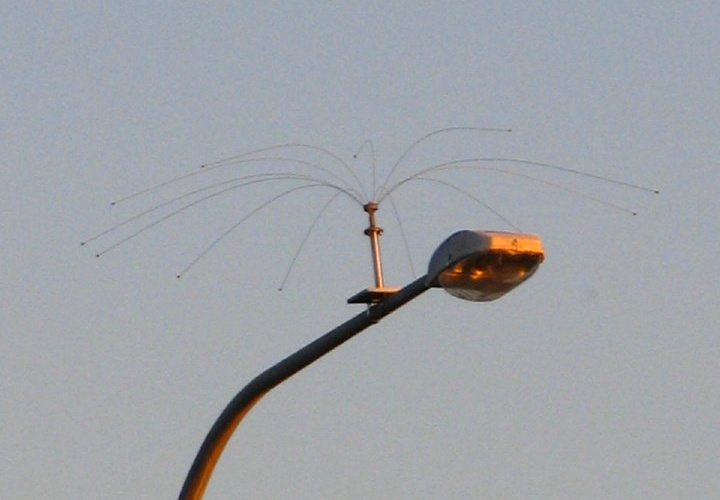
...Except on the five light poles with deterrents.

While the 2006 trial of the Daddi Long Legs-brand bird deterrents was successful, considerable misinformation that pelicans would be injured has put off their rollout to the other 44 light poles.

A notable characteristic of the Houghton Highway until 2010, other than its significant length, was the particularly rough surface and therefore ride quality. Each concrete span has a slight concave curve, so a distinct corrugated ride was felt when driving over the bridge. These ride characteristics were due to the absence of a bitumen overlay prior to 2010, when the bridge was upgraded in conjunction with the construction of the Ted Smout Memorial Bridge.

=== Worst road recognition ===
In February 2004, an RACQ survey recognised the Houghton Highway as the number one "pain in the neck" with Queensland motorists. Some 1200 members responded to the survey, asking them to nominate problem roads and intersections in the state. Respondents identified problems including insufficient capacity, the tidal flow or an accident/breakdown on the bridge causing major congestion, an inappropriate speed limit (60 km/h (37 mph)), and the lack of consideration given by authorities to another bridge crossing.

== Original layout and intention ==
The original intention of the Houghton Highway was to provide two lanes of southbound traffic, with the Hornibrook Bridge to be refurbished to provide two lanes of northbound traffic, doubling original capacity. When the Houghton Highway opened, it initially provided one lane in each direction, intended to temporarily replace the Hornibrook Bridge while its proposed refurbishment was conducted.

The initial deck layout (from west to east) consisted of two 3,700 mm (145.7 in) lanes, an 1,800 mm (70.9 in) shoulder or "breakdown lane", and a 1,900 mm (74.8 in) footway. With just a diminutive reinforced concrete kerb to separate pedestrians from 80 km/h (50 mph) passing traffic, the use of the footway was minimal. The bridge had a southbound breakdown lane, on the basis that the two-way traffic flow was only meant to be temporary.

With the Hornibrook Bridge closed for refurbishment, engineers were able to make a closer examination to determine more clearly the extent of work required. They found that deterioration of the bridge was worse than first expected, and the cost to bring the bridge up to an acceptable standard, and its continued maintenance, would be far greater than original predictions. At the same time, the state government believed that Redcliffe's future growth would be in its western areas, and therefore the connections of Redcliffe to the Bruce Highway should receive more attention – the original land-based and much longer route to Brisbane before the Hornibrook Bridge opened in 1935.

== Increasing capacity with just one bridge ==
With the proposed refurbishment of the Hornibrook Bridge cancelled, in October 1982 the Department of Main Roads investigated modification of the Houghton Highway, only ten months after it opened. Facing an unintended situation where the new bridge as built would not deliver any increased capacity, the modification of the bridge was completed within twelve months.

The modifications involved the removal of the pedestrian footway, addition of a third lane and a tidal flow arrangement to provide two lanes for peak traffic flow – southbound in the morning and northbound in the afternoon and evening (reversed on weekends). As breakdown lanes could not be provided, emergency telephones and overhead lighting were also fitted to the bridge at the same time. The Houghton Highway did not originally include overhead lighting, whereas the old bridge did.

Modifications to the bridge commenced in March 1982, and were completed by 3 September the same year, at a total cost of $435,000. The upgrade included six gantries, eight switchable message signs, 54 traffic signals, two mast arms, 51 overhead lights, 12 emergency telephones, 27.5 km (17.1 mi) of power cable and 2 km (1.2 mi) of communication cable.

== Cracking and deterioration ==
A routine inspection of Houghton Highway in 1991 found an alkali-silica reaction in the pre-stressed concrete piles. This reaction caused internal cracking of the concrete, and crumbling and spalling of the concrete leaving the reinforcing steel exposed to the marine environment.

Approximately 500 piles were encased in concrete below the water surface and up to 500 mm (19.7 in) above the high water level. Above this point, an externally bonded carbon fibre reinforced polymer was applied, wrapping the column to cover the damage and contain and conceal the existing cracks. It was also believed that such composites offered re-strengthening and a protection of the piles through encapsulated resin during the lamination.

The treatment work was completed in 2000, and the repairs and condition of the piles are continually monitored.

== Upgrading and political controversy ==
Increasing traffic resulted in the bridge reaching its upgraded capacity in the late 1990s. In particular, vehicle breakdowns or accidents that resulted in the temporary closure of one or more lanes causing congestion and delays demonstrated the vulnerability of the situation.

=== Tidal flow upgrade ===
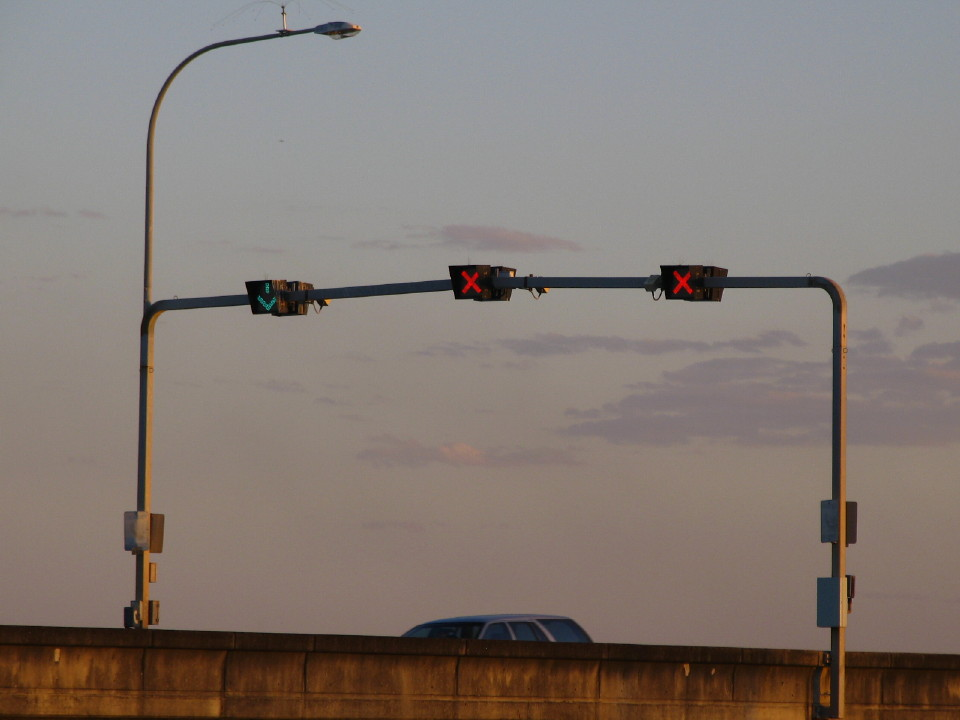
The upgraded tidal flow LED lane control displays

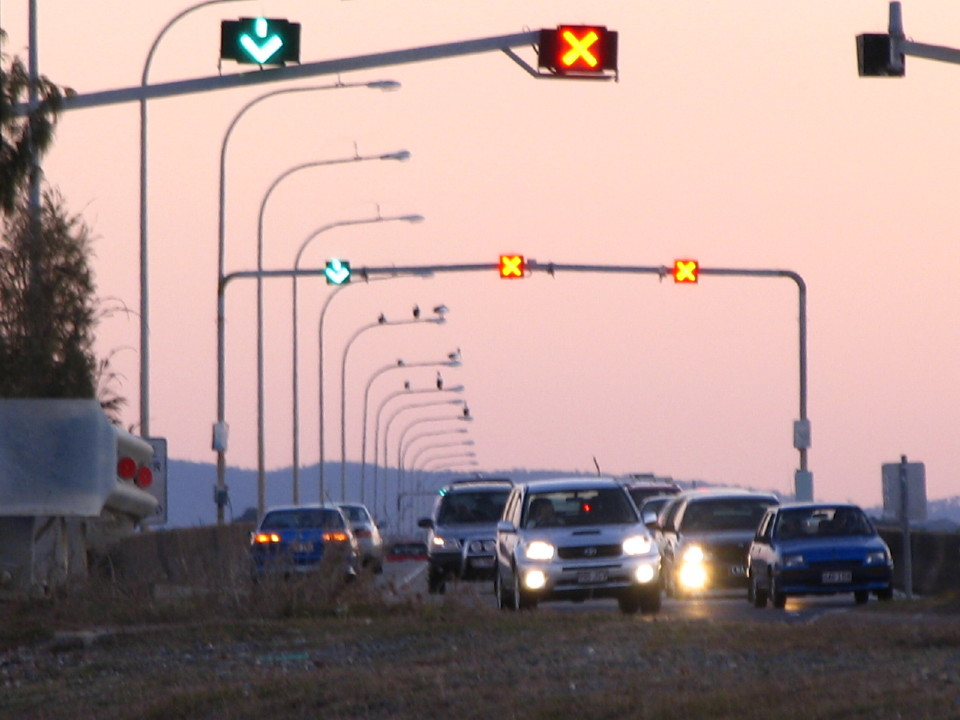
Evening peak traffic arriving into Redcliffe

The Department of Transport and Main Roads undertook a further upgrade of the bridge's tidal flow system. Commissioned in 2002 at a cost of $1.8 million, this upgrade included the replacement of the overhead arrow and cross signals with brighter, LED displays, monitoring of traffic flows and conditions with supervision of the system data and view of the bridge by CCTV at the remote Traffic Management Centre in Woolloongabba, Brisbane. Operators were for the first time also able to close and open lanes as required from the remote location.

The upgrade project suffered delays from "technical issues", resulting in the then Transport and Main Roads Minister, The Hon Steve Bredhauer, thanking Redcliffe residents for their patience. Six months later, the Minister apologised for extensive delays after the system failed when a council contractor cut both the main and back-up power supplies to the tidal flow system just before 10:00am. Evening peak hour traffic was severely disrupted and banked-up for several kilometres as the bridge fell into "safe mode" with one lane open in each direction for over 10 hours until Energex reconnected power at 8:00pm. Changes implemented after this incident included an improved back-up power supply that was separate from the main supply, tighter controls on works near the bridge requiring approval by the Department of Main Roads, and a variable message sign on the Gateway Motorway at Deagon to warn motorists of delays and suggest taking the longer, western route to Redcliffe via the Bruce Highway.

=== Reduced speed limit ===
In 2003 the speed limit was reduced from 80 km/h (50 mph) to 60 km/h (37 mph). The reduced speed limit also included a 500 m (1,600 ft) approach to the southern end of the bridge along mostly 90 km/h (56 mph) four-lane Deagon Deviation dual carriageway. This 500 m (1,600 ft) approach was previously 80 km/h along with the bridge, and became 60 km/h with it. The stated reason behind the reduced speed limit was to reduce crash incidents, therefore reducing delays and blockages.

The reduced speed limit was initially trialled for nine months from September 2003 until June 2004, then extended for a further six months. The Redcliffe City Council did not support a 60 km/h speed limit trial, and requested the Minister for Transport and Main Roads to reduce the trial period to three months. The Minister replied, committed to the nine-month trial.

In November 2004, the state government declared the trial a success, using data that showed only three crashes in the nine-month trial period. The data did not include vehicle breakdowns on the bridge that would have involved delays from blocked lanes. Prior to the permanent speed limit being announced, a four-vehicle crash occurred with a motorist trapped in her car, closing the bridge in the evening peak for three hours, and again caused banked-up traffic for several kilometres and forced motorists to take the longer western route via the Bruce Highway.

=== Political considerations ===
Labor's Ray Hollis won the seat of Redcliffe in the 1989 election of the Goss government and, except for a slim 0.5% lead in 1995, the seat of Redcliffe built-up with a safe Labor majority of 13.7% in 2001.

Continuing disquiet about the bridge capacity, and calls for it to be duplicated or replaced, were persistently rejected by the government – a media statement titled "Call for second bridge rejected" was issued by the Transport and Main Roads Minister on 11 July 2003. However, three months later the then Queensland Premier, The Hon Peter Beattie, issued a statement announcing a study into when a new Redcliffe bridge might be built. A reason for this change of stance included campaigning by the Redcliffe City Council and a study they commissioned into the duplication of the bridge, frustrated by the apparent lack of interest in the matter by the state government.

Just over two months later, a state election was called, earlier than anticipated, for 7 February 2004. During the election campaign, the Liberal candidate, Terry Rogers, raised the issue of a new bridge to Redcliffe, and Hollis suffered a 10.5% swing but held on to the now-marginal seat. Suddenly a new bridge became a need for Redcliffe.

In the next year, Hollis became involved in two scandals and the opposition called for his resignation. When the state government announced the duplication of the Houghton Highway in April 2005, the opposition suspected that Hollis was going to resign and stepped up their campaign against him. Hollis resigned for health reasons in July triggering a by-election, and the promise of a new bridge was made by both parties; the government announced it had already started the survey and public consultation phase. The Liberal candidate, once again Terry Rogers, won the 20 August by-election, while Labor won the seat back in 2006.

== Highway duplication ==
The duplication of the Houghton Highway consisted of a new bridge named the Ted Smout Memorial Bridge. It was officially completed on 11 July 2010 and open to southbound traffic on 15 July 2010.

After the opening of the Ted Smout Memorial bridge, the Houghton Highway was upgraded with a bitumen overlay and new variable speed limit signs. The reduced 60 km/h (37 mph) speed limit was lifted on 19 August 2011, returning to the original 80 km/h (50 mph). This marked the completion of its rejuvenation and, with the new bitumen surface, an improved ride quality was provided 31 years after it opened.

== Gallery ==
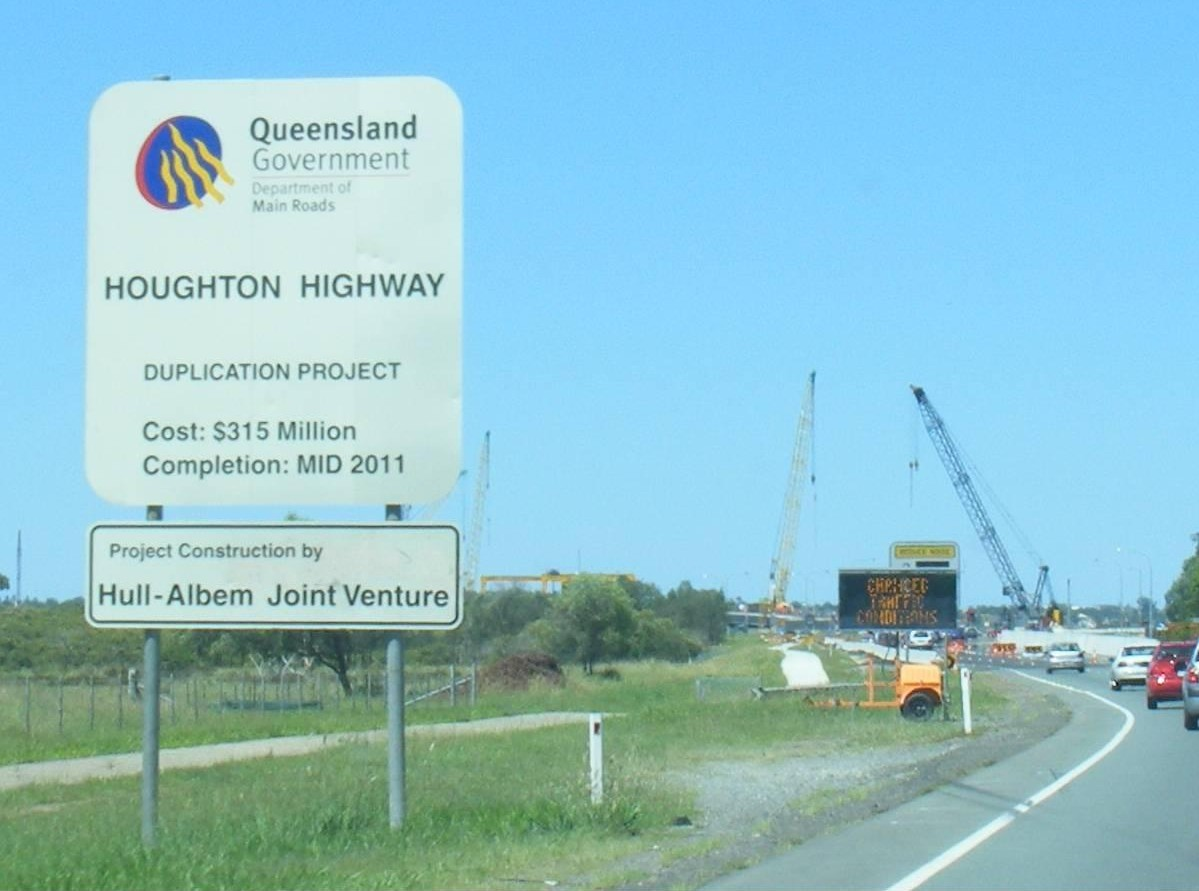
Project sign at the southern approach

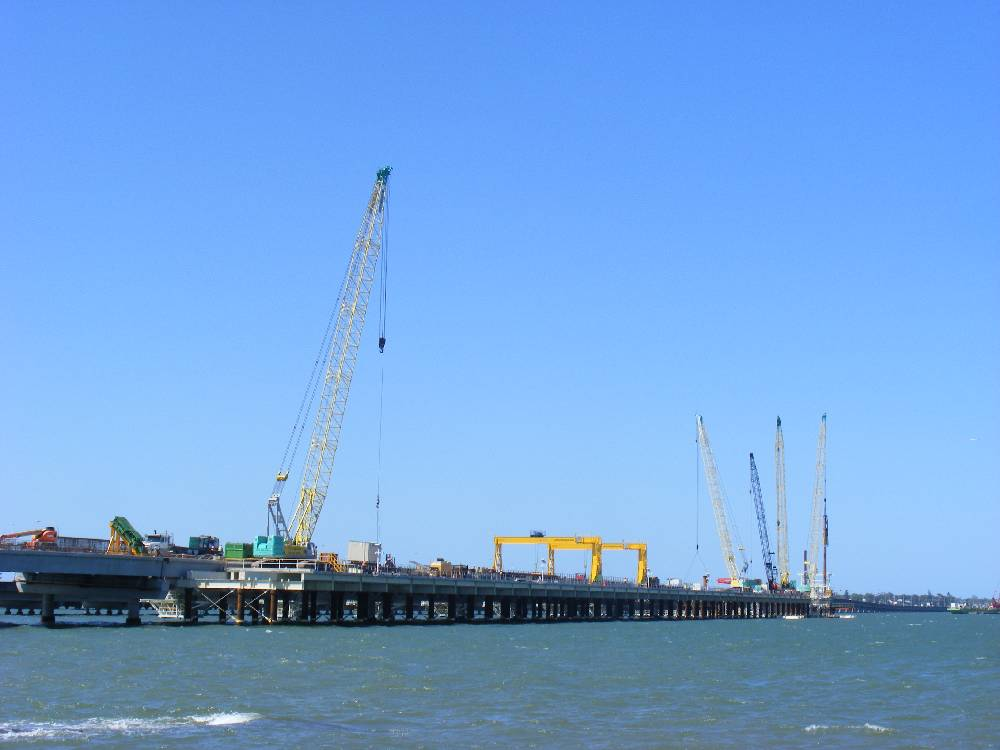
Construction from Brighton foreshore (south east)

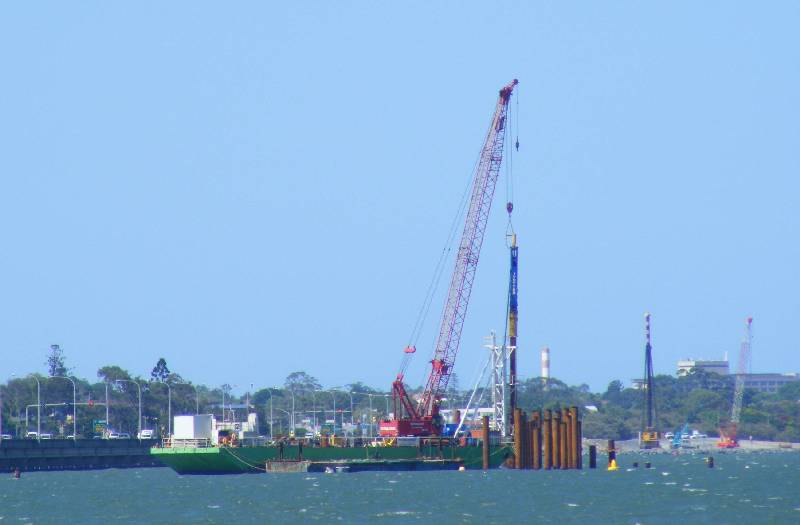
Pile barge at the fishing platform site

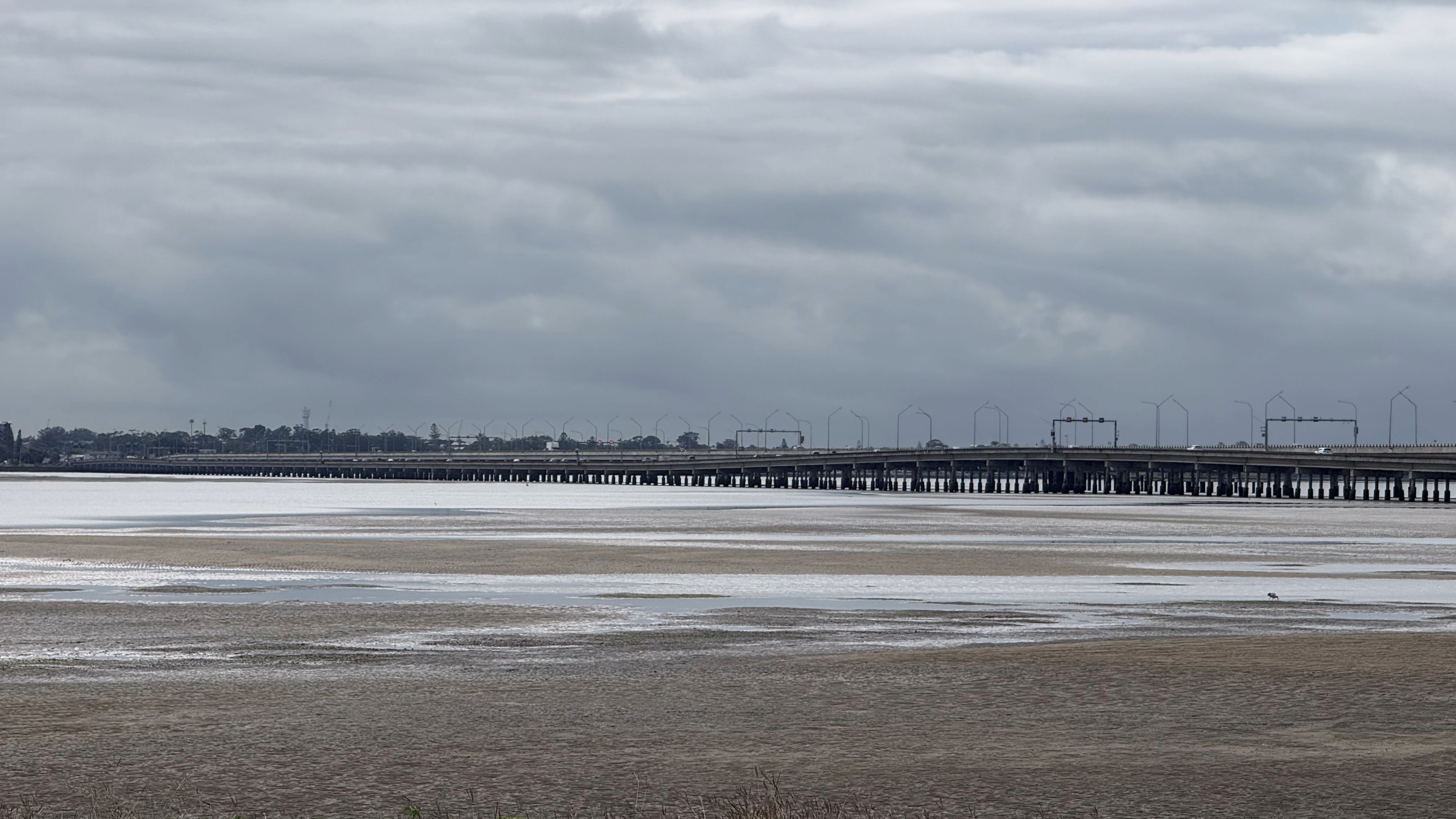
Houghton Highway and Ted Smout Memorial Bridge from Brighton Park (north east)

== See also ==
- Ted Smout Memorial Bridge
- Hornibrook Bridge
- Redcliffe Peninsula road network
