= List of bridges in Hobart =

This is a list of major bridges in Hobart, Tasmania, Australia:

- Blair Street Bridge
- Bowen Bridge
- Bridgewater Bridge
- Hobart Bridge
- Jordan River Bridge
- Mcgees Bridge
- Sorell Causeway
- Tasman Bridge

== See also ==
- List of bridges in Australia
