= Pine River (Queensland) =

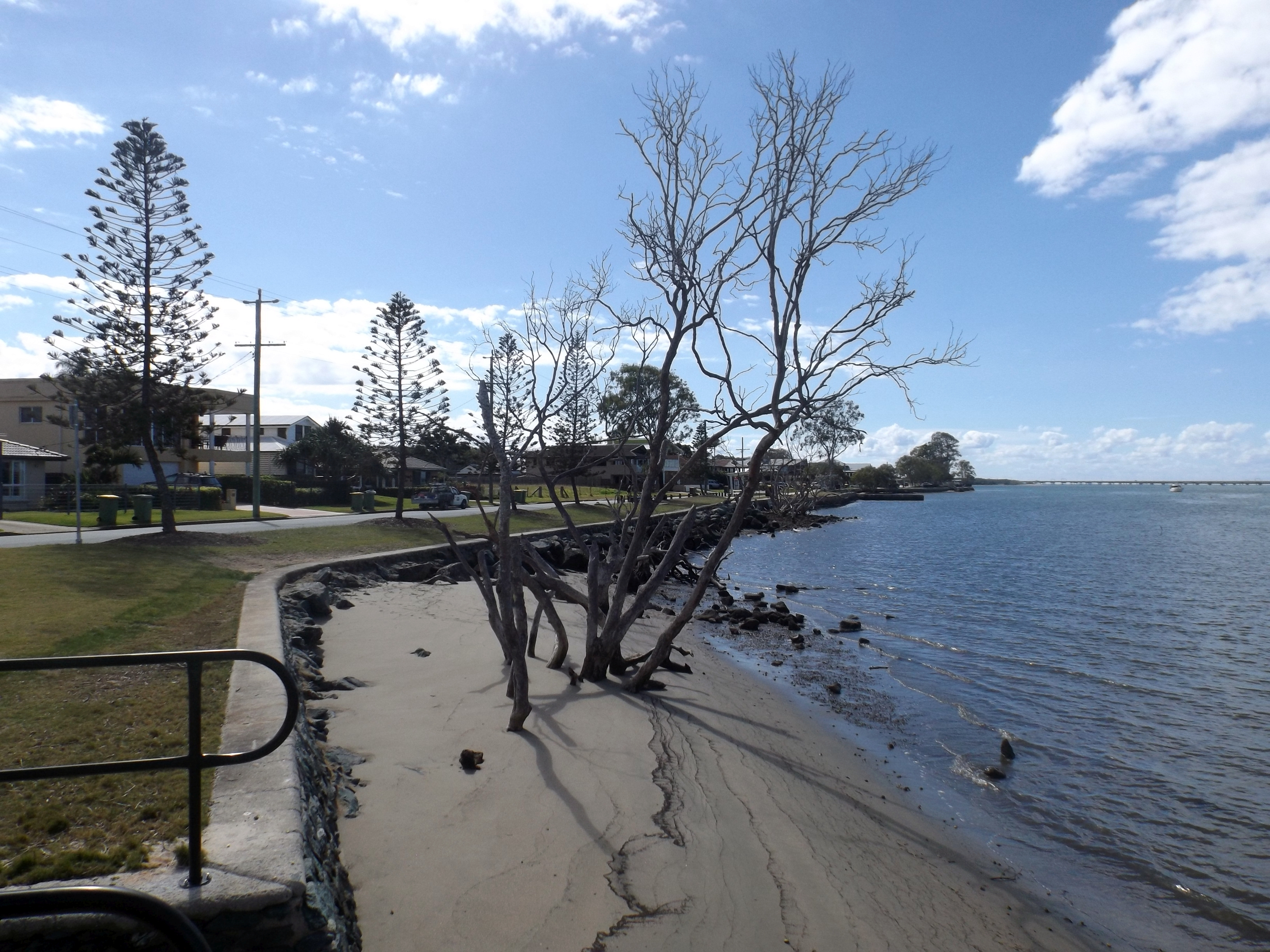
- Dohles Rocks Road at Griffin, 2016

- Location of the Pine River mouth in Queensland

Location
- Country: Australia
- State: Queensland
- Region: South East Queensland

Physical characteristics
- Source: D'Aguilar Range
- Source confluence: North and South Pine Rivers
  - location: Lawnton
  - coordinates: 27.2875°S 153.015833°E
  - elevation: 11 m (36 ft)
- Mouth: Bramble Bay, Moreton Bay
  - location: north of Brighton
  - coordinates: 27.278681°S 153.04718°E
  - elevation: 0 m (0 ft)
- Length: 7 km (4.3 mi)

Basin features
- Tributaries
  - right: Bald Hills Creek

The Pine River is a river in South East Queensland, Australia. The river is formed by the confluence of the North Pine and the South Pine rivers at Lawnton, continuing into Bramble Bay.

== Location and features ==
The Pine River carries the city border between the City of Moreton Bay and City of Brisbane along its middle (continuing up the South Pine River). The northern shoreline followsuburbs of Murrumba Downs and Griffin, while the southern shoreline follows Brisbane suburbs of Bald Hills and Brighton. The river descends 11 metres (36 ft) over its 7-kilometre (4.3 mi) course. The Bald Hills Creek feeds into the Pine River which create the Bald Hills Creek and Tinchi Tamba Wetlands Reserve, a large environmental park covering more than 380 hectares (940 acres). The Pine River and Hays Inlet wetland is significant because of its value to wildlife, especially migratory waders. The Pine River is classified as being "extensively modified".

The Pine Rivers Shire draws its name from the Pine, the North Pine and the South Pine rivers.

== Flora species ==
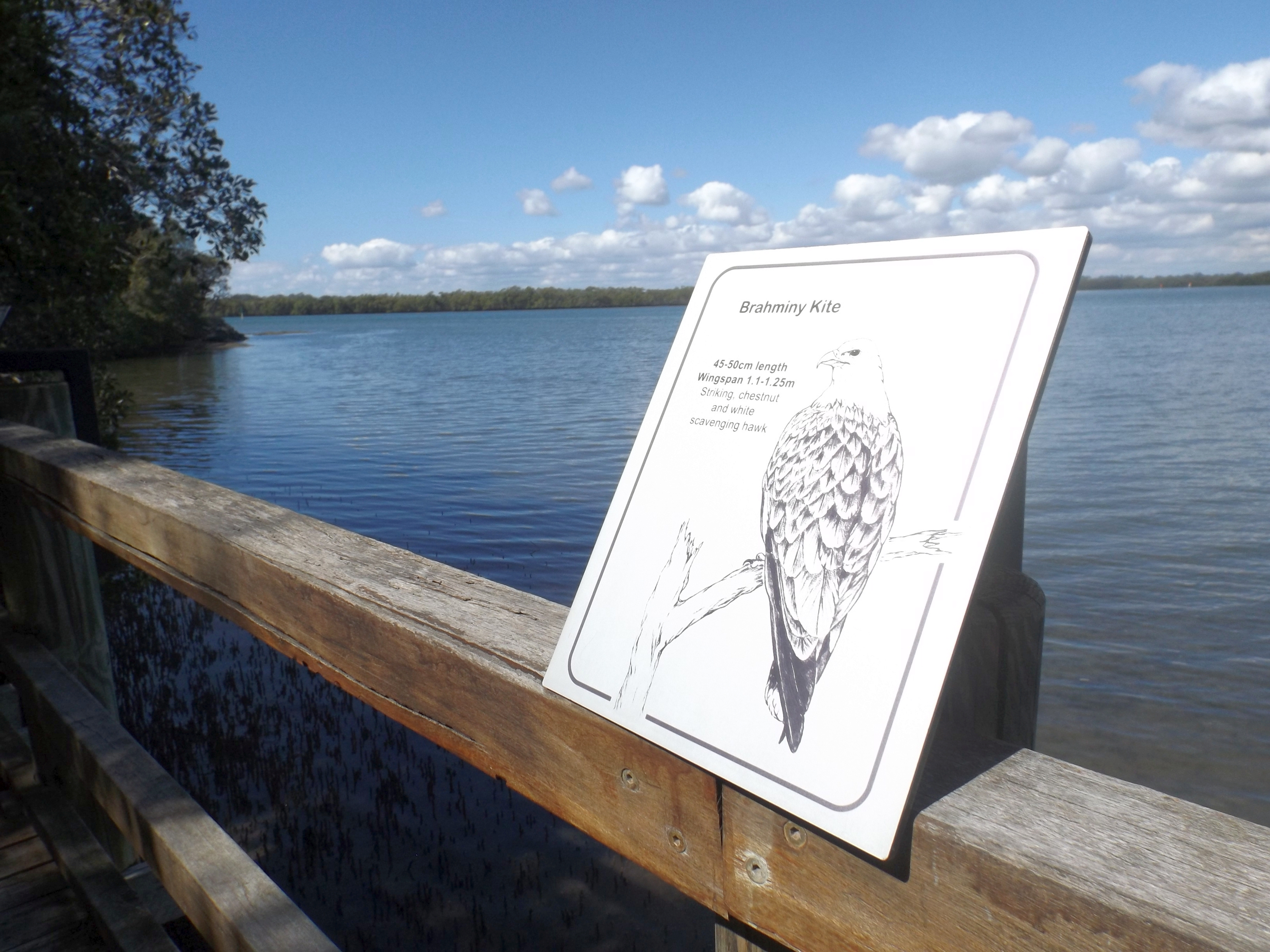
Osprey House boardwalk, 2016

- Mangrove species:
  - River mangrove (Aegiceras corniculatum)
  - Large-fruited orange mangrove (Bruguiera gymnorhiza)
  - Yellow mangrove (Ceriops tagal)
  - Spotted mangrove (Rhizophora stylosa)
  - Milky mangrove (Exoecaria agallocha)
  - Black mangrove (Lumnitzera racemosa)
- Eucalypt and mixed woodland species:
  - Moreton Bay ash (Corymbia tessellaris)
  - Grey ironbark (Eucalyptus paniculata)
  - Swamp she-oak (Casuarina glauca)
  - White bottlebrush (Callistemon salignus)
  - Swamp paperbark (M. quinquenervia)
  - Broad-leaved leopard tree (Flindersia collina)
  - Cotton tree (Hibiscus tiliaceus)

The predominant land uses in the catchment area are native bush, grazing, rural residential and urban.

== Human uses ==
Water supply: North Pine Dam North Pine Dam (Lake Samsonvale) is located on the North Pine River. The storage capacity for water supply is 215,000 megalitres (7,600×10^{6} cu ft).

Recreational fishing: Pine River is a popular waterway for recreational fishing. Total estimated recreational catch for Pine River in 1997 was 1,509,755 fish (2.71% of Qld total) from an estimated 141,092 fishing trips (1.31% of Qld total). Estimated catch by top five species were: whiting 351,799, bream 230,598, winter whiting 203,028, diver whiting 190,131, snapper (squire) 127,298. (Data for 1999)

A maximum of ten commercial boats fished Pine River in 1999, for a total catch of 21.9 tonnes (21.6 long tons; 24.1 short tons). Pine River is also used for other water-based recreation, including water skiing and the use of personal watercraft.

== See also ==
- List of rivers of Australia § Queensland
