= Clontarf, Queensland =

Clontarf
- Suburb
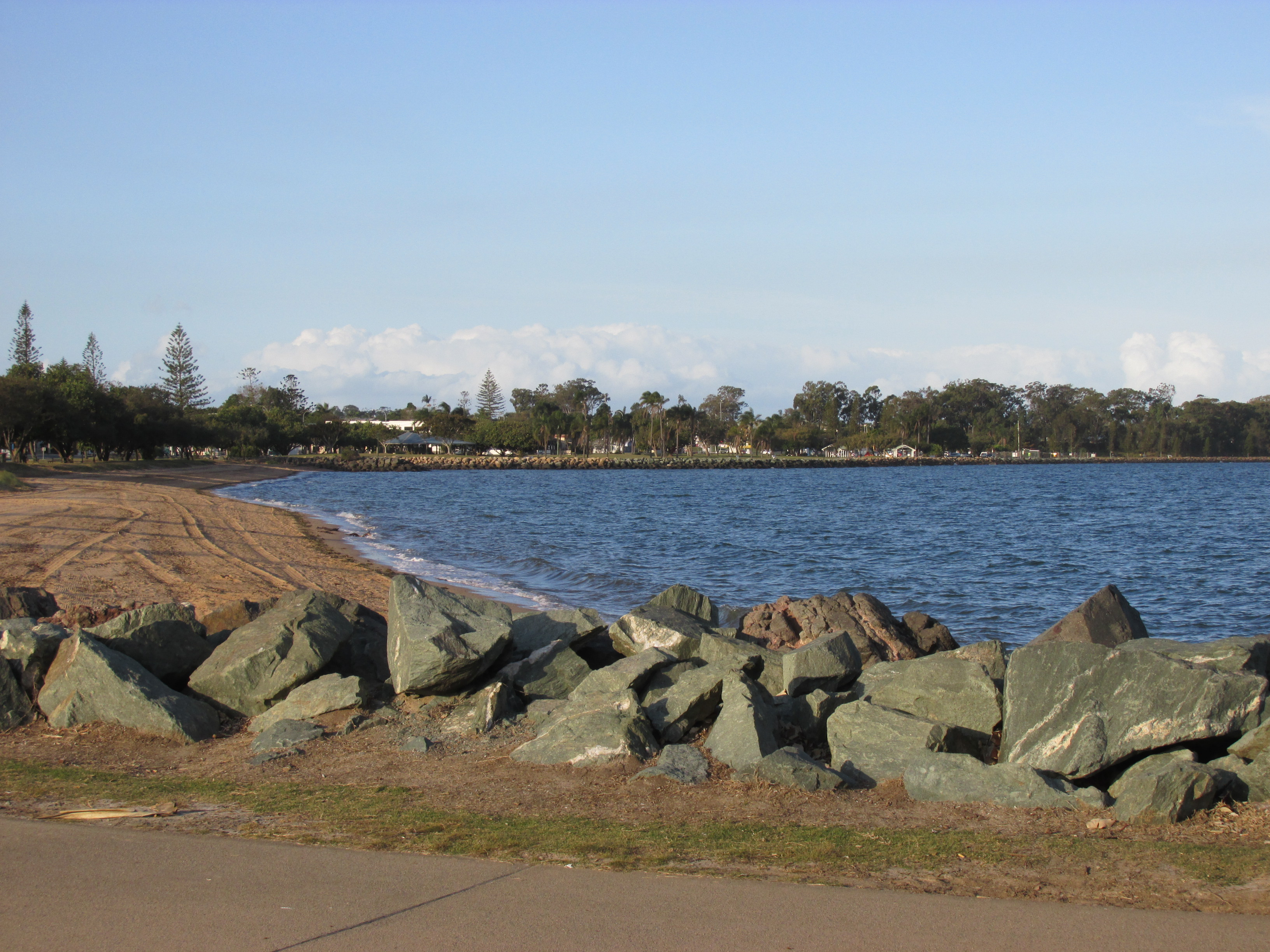
- Clontarf Pelican Park eastern end

- Interactive map of Clontarf
- Coordinates: 27.2463°S 153.0827°E
- Country: Australia
- State: Queensland
- Region: South East Queensland
- LGA: City of Moreton Bay
- Location: 4.6 km (2.9 mi) SW of Redcliffe; 34.4 km (21.4 mi) NNE of Brisbane CBD

Government
  - State electorate: Redcliffe
  - Federal division: Petrie

Area
  - Total: 9.9 km^{2} (3.8 sq mi)
- Elevation: 12 m (39 ft)

Population
  - Total: 8,446 (2021 census)
  - Density: 853/km^{2} (2,210/sq mi)
- Time zone: UTC+10:00 (AEST)
- Postcode: 4019
Suburbs around Clontarf
Rothwell	Kippa-Ring	Kippa-Ring
Mango Hill	Clontarf	Margate
Griffin	Moreton Bay	Woody Point

Clontarf is a coastal suburb in the City of Moreton Bay, Queensland, Australia. It is in the south-west of the Redcliffe Peninsula, approximately 34.4 kilometres (21.4 mi) by road north-northeast of Brisbane, the state capital. In the 2021 census, Clontarf had a population of 8,446 people.

== Geography ==
Clontarf is connected to Brisbane City, across Bramble Bay, by the Houghton Highway which is a 2.7 kilometres (1.7 mi) long causeway that provides access to the southern tip of the Redcliffe Peninsula, greatly decreasing the travel time between Redcliffe and Brisbane. The current pair of bridges, Houghton Highway and its twin Ted Smout Memorial Bridge, replaced the original Hornibrook Bridge which is now closed and mostly removed except for a short span (on the north) and the two iconic bridge entrance towers that were retained to form a very popular fishing pier at the northern and southern ends of Bramble Bay.

The land use is a mix of residential and light industrial.

== History ==
In 1881,108 allotments at Hayes Inlet Estate, Humpy Bong of what is now Clontarf were offered for sale. The Clontarf estate went to auction on 26 September 1882. The sale was widely advertised including a coloured lithograph, showing the sub-division of Dr Ward's sugar plantation and using references to the city of Redcliffe "in the near future" and a regular steam ferry service between Sandgate and Clontarf within months in the newspaper advertisements. The success which attended this sale of the Clontarf Estate led to Clontarf North sale in December 1882. The placename is after the Clontarf district of Dublin, Ireland.

Clontarf Beach State School opened on 31 January 1950.

St Barnabas' Anglican Church was dedicated on 5 July 1959 by Archbishop Reginald Halse. In the 1990s it was decided to combine the congregations of St Barnabas' and St Mark's in Woody Point into a new St Peter the Fisherman's Anglican Church at Clontarf. This led to the closure of St Mark's on 24 April 1993 which was approved by Assistant Bishop George Browning. This resulted in the closure of St Barnabas circa 1992. St Peter the Fisherman's was dedicated in 1993 and consecrated in 1996.

Clontarf Beach State High School opened on 28 January 1964.

Grace Lutheran Primary School opened on 26 January 1971.

== Demographics ==
In the 2011 census, Clontarf recorded a population of 7,911 people, 50.2% female and 49.8% male. The median age of the Clontarf population was 42 years, 5 years above the national median of 37. 76.2% of people living in Clontarf were born in Australia. The other top responses for country of birth were New Zealand 5.5%, England 5.2%, Scotland 0.8%, Philippines 0.8%, South Africa 0.5%. 90.7% of people spoke only English at home; the next most common languages were 0.4% Tagalog, 0.4% German, 0.3% Dutch, 0.3% Italian, 0.3% Samoan.

In the 2016 census, Clontarf had a population of 8,279 people.

In the 2021 census, Clontarf had a population of 8,446 people.

== Heritage listings ==
Clontarf has a number of heritage-listed sites, including:

- Hornibrook Highway: Hornibrook Bridge (the first of the three bridges).

== Economy ==
Clontarf's west hosts the largest industrial area in the Redcliffe area, and the area is a significant source of employment for the region. Many residents of Clontarf also commute to Brisbane daily for work. Commuters also travel to Brisbane by train, as there is now a train line that connects to the peninsula.

Clontarf is host to two adjacent medium-sized shopping centres, on the southern tip of the suburb. Most retail commerce in the suburb revolves around small business however, and there are many stand alone corner stores and other small businesses still in existence.

== Education ==
Clontarf Beach State School is a government primary (Prep–6) school for boys and girls at Elizabeth Avenue (27.2533°S 153.0811°E). In 2018, the school had an enrolment of 451 students with 37 teachers (32 full-time equivalent) and 25 non-teaching staff (14 full-time equivalent). It includes a special education program at Clontarf Beach State School at Elizabeth Avenue (27.2533°S 153.0811°E).

Grace Lutheran Primary School is a private primary (Prep–6) school for boys and girls at 38 Maine Road (27.2542°S 153.0896°E). In 2018, the school had an enrolment of 393 students with 29 teachers (25 full-time equivalent) and 23 non-teaching staff (13 full-time equivalent).

Clontarf Beach State High School is a government secondary (7–12) school for boys and girls at the corner of Elizabeth Avenue and King Street (27.2479°S 153.0861°E). In 2018, the school had an enrolment of 923 students with 78 teachers (76 full-time equivalent) and 42 non-teaching staff (33 full-time equivalent). It includes a special education program.

== Amenities ==
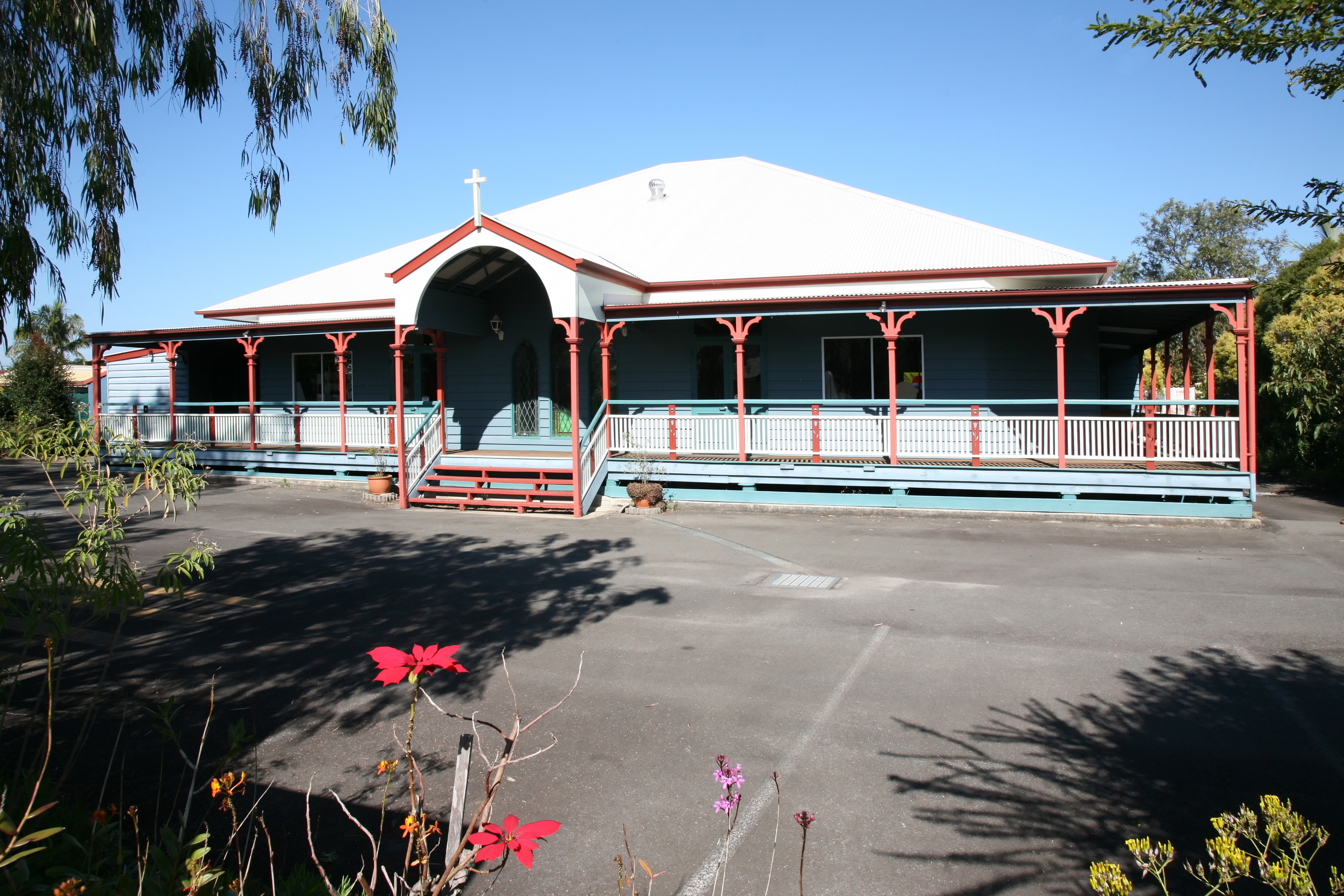
St Peter the Fisherman's Anglican Church, 2008

St Peter the Fisherman's Anglican Church is at 13 Lucinda Street (27.2465°S 153.0892°E).

Peninsula Life Church is at 3–7 Lavelle Court (27.2467°S 153.0938°E). It is part of the Wesleyan Methodist Church.

The Clontarf branch of the Queensland Country Women's Association meets at the corner of Victoria Avenue and Georgina Street at Woody Point.

== Public transport ==
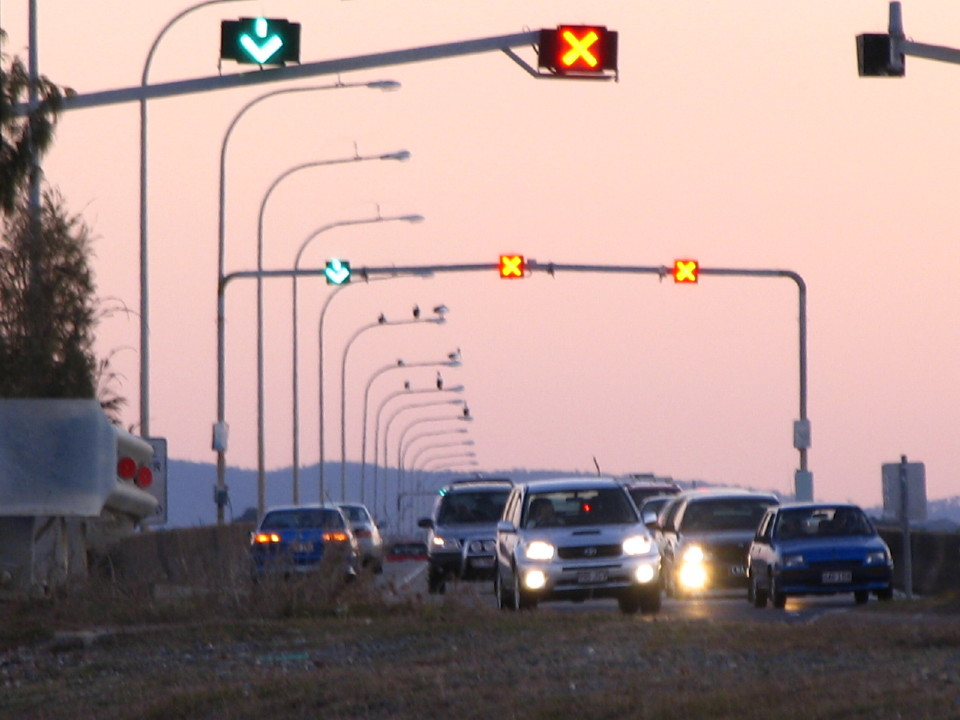
Evening peak traffic flow into Clontarf

Clontarf is served by several bus routes: Route 694, an internal route within Redcliffe City, and Routes 690 and 691 to Sandgate railway station, an approximately 10- to 15-minute commute. All services are provided by Hornibrook Bus Lines.

The Redcliffe Peninsula line is a 12 kilometres (7.5 mi) stretch of heavy gauge dual-track railway between Petrie and Kippa-Ring on the Redcliffe Peninsula. The new line is part of the QR Citytrain suburban network, branching from the Caboolture line. It starts 200 metres north of Petrie railway station, extending from (27.5 kilometres (17.1 mi) to 40.1 kilometres (24.9 mi) north of Central railway station).

== Attractions ==
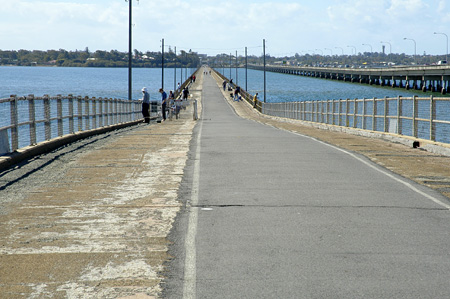
The Hornibrook Bridge, looking towards the southern tip of Clontarf

Clontarf Beach and Bells Beach are two of the closest beaches to Brisbane City.

The Hornibrook Pier is a popular fishing spot and gathering point for families developed from the remnants of the historic Hornibrook Highway bridge that was removed in 2010 when the Ted Smout Memorial Bridge was opened.

The challenging and historic Redcliffe Golf Course is also found in Clontarf since 1936. It is home to numerous wildlife species including grey kangaroos and koalas.

The Kroll gardens and large Kroll Gardens Dog park are a popular destination to unwind after work or on weekends for many.

Pelican Park is known for its kite flying conditions, and a local industry has built around the sport. On weekends, many kites can be seen flying above Clontarf from the Hornibrook Bridge.

== Events ==
During May, the Redcliffe Kite Club, based in Clontarf holds a two-day kite event called Kitefest.

== See also ==
- Redcliffe Peninsula road network

== Gallery ==
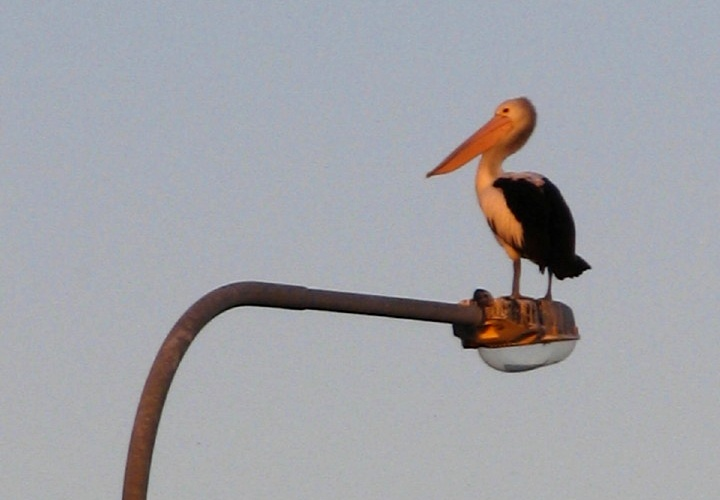
Roosting pelican on the Houghton

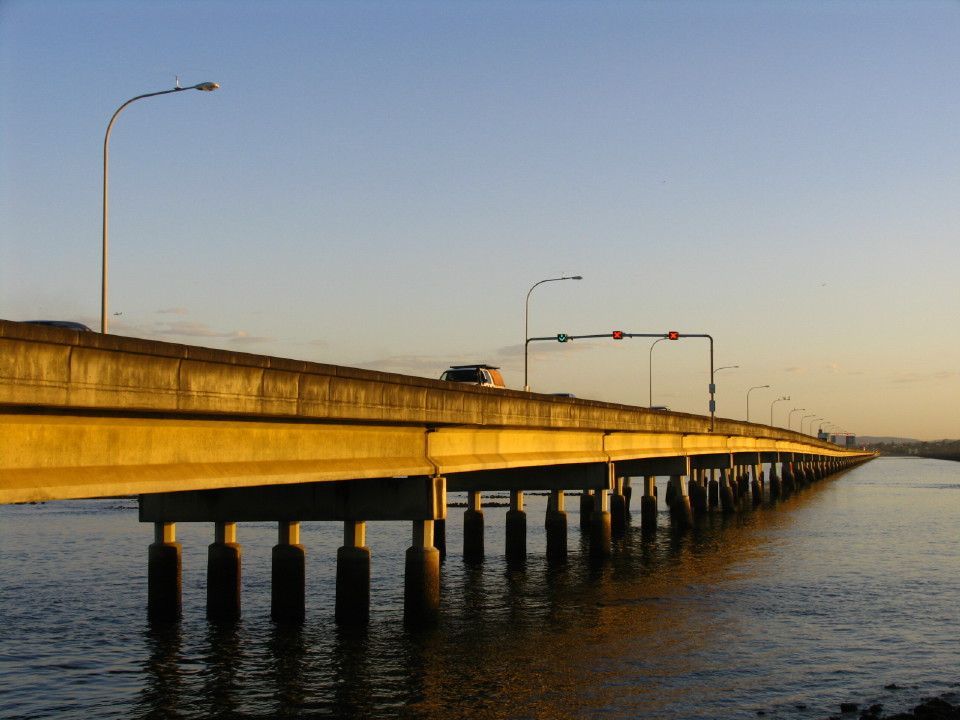
Houghton Highway at sunset
