= City of Redcliffe =

Coordinates: 27°13′47.06″S 153°06′29.71″E

- Local government area
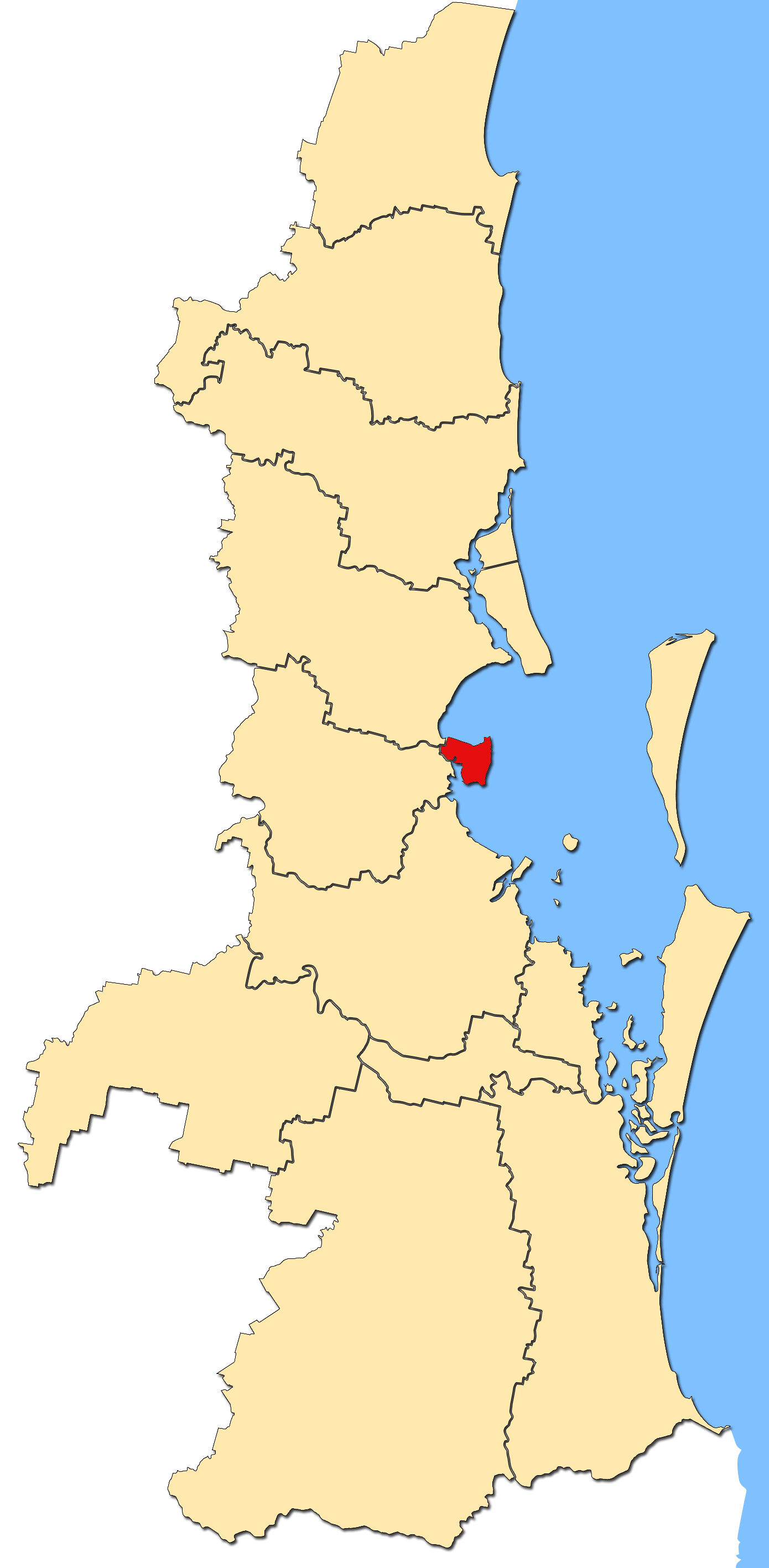
- Map of Redcliffe City in South East Queensland

- Country: Australia
- State: Queensland
- Location: 23 km (14 mi) S of Brisbane CBD
- Established: 1824

Government
  - Mayor: Cr Allan Sutherland
  - State electorate: Redcliffe, Murrumba
  - Federal division: Petrie

Area
  - Total: 38.1 km^{2} (14.7 sq mi)

Population
  - Total: 51,174 (2006 census)
  - Density: 1,343.1/km^{2} (3,479/sq mi)
- Postcode: 4019, 4020, 4021, 4022
- Website: City of Redcliffe
LGAs around City of Redcliffe
Caboolture	Deception Bay	Moreton Bay
Pine Rivers	City of Redcliffe	Moreton Bay
Brisbane	Bramble Bay	Moreton Bay

The City of Redcliffe is a former local government area in South East Queensland, Australia. In 2008, it was amalgamated with the Shires of Pine Rivers and Caboolture to create Moreton Bay Region, later renamed City of Moreton Bay. It was in the northern part of the County of Stanley, with a total area of 38.1 square kilometres (14.7 sq mi) and a population of 51,174 people in the 2006 census.

== Suburbs ==
The City of Redcliffe included the following suburbs:

- Redcliffe
- Clontarf
- Kippa-Ring
- Margate
- Newport
- Rothwell
- Scarborough
- Woody Point

== History ==
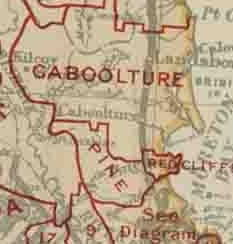
Map of Redcliffe Division and adjacent local government areas, March 1902. Legend: Kedron Division & Sandgate Borough (See Diagram)

Caboolture Division was created on 11 November 1879 as one of 74 divisions around Queensland under the Divisional Boards Act 1879. It was centred on Caboolture, which was at that time a small logging town, and initially covered all of Moreton Bay and much of the Sunshine Coast, but by 1890 had shrunk considerably with the separate incorporation of the Pine Division (21 January 1888), Redcliffe Division (5 April 1888) and Maroochy Division (5 July 1890).

Redcliffe Division became the Shire of Redcliffe on 31 March 1903 after the Local Authorities Act 1902 was enacted. On 28 May 1921 it became the Town of Redcliffe.

In June 1952 Keitha Drake was elected as the first female member of the Redcliffe local government. Her reason for standing for election was to get a hospital for Redcliffe's growing population. The first Redcliffe Hospital opened in 1961.

On 13 June 1959 the Town of Redcliffe became the City of Redcliffe.

On 27 June 2007 the Queensland Government's Local Government Reform Commission recommended the City of Redcliffe merge with neighbouring Shire of Pine Rivers and Shire of Caboolture, to become the Moreton Bay Region. This came into effect on 15 March 2008, under the Local Government (Reform Implementation) Act 2007 passed by the Parliament of Queensland on 10 August 2007.

== Demographics ==
In the 2006 census (the last one), the City of Redcliffe had a population of 51,174 people with a female skew. Indigenous Australians were 1.9% of the population, while 27.2% were born overseas, 5.1% of the population spoke a language other than English at home.

Redcliffe Population as per 2006 Census
	Male	Female	Total
Total persons excluding overseas visitors	24,535	26,639	51,174
Aged 15 years and over	19,795	22,275	42,070
Aged 65 years and over	4,109	5,694	9,803
Indigenous	510	507	1,017
Aged 18 years and over	270	309	579
Born in Australia	18,032	19,612	37,644
Born overseas Includes 'Inadequately described', 'At sea', and 'Not elsewhere classified'	4,912	5,340	10,252
Source: Australian Bureau of Statistics

== Council structure ==
The Redcliffe City Council consisted of one Mayor and seven councillors. The mayor and councillors represented the entire city, elected every four years by popular vote.

== Council services ==
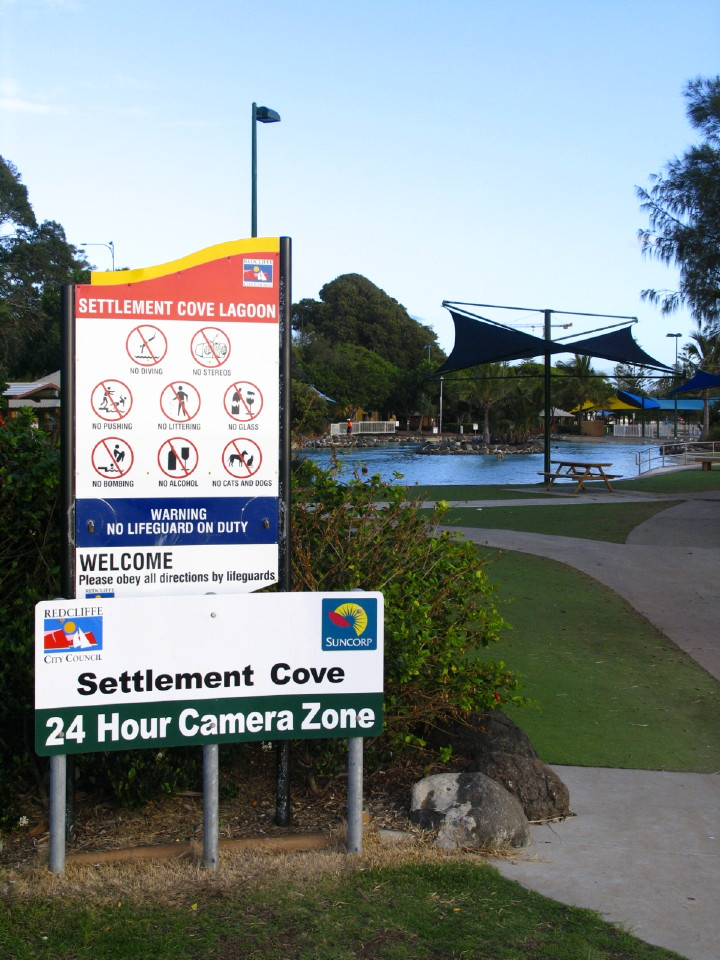
Settlement Cove in Redcliffe was developed by Redcliffe City Council

The council had an annual budget of approximately $65 million (2005/06) with works involving such areas as road maintenance and construction, community, cultural and youth activities, town planning and development, water and sewerage, waste management and recycling, maintenance of parks and public areas, library services, public health and animal control, and business and tourism support.

== Chairmen and mayors ==
- 1888: Edmund MacDonnell
- 1905: A. J. Wylie
- 1906: P. P. Fewings
- 1908: E.F. Morgan
- 1927: J. B. Dunn
- 1930–1943: Alfred Henry Langdon
- 1943– Joseph Hendry Grice
- 1946–1949?: Robert Thomas (Bob) Bradley
- 1955–1964: Jim Houghton
- 1964–1976: Cec Kroll
- 1976–1985: Ray Frawley
- 1985–1991: Alf Charlish
- 1991–1997: Barry Bolton
- 1997–2004: Alan Boulton
- 2004–2008: Alan Sutherland (first mayor of the Moreton Bay Region)

== Sister cities ==
The City of Redcliffe had two Sister City arrangements:

- Japan – Sanyō-Onoda, Yamaguchi*
- Australia – Winton, Queensland*

== Surrounding local government areas ==
Redcliffe is immediately north of Brisbane's area, connected from Clontarf to Brighton via the historic Hornibrook Bridge and Houghton Highway. Shire of Pine Rivers is to the south-west of the peninsula, and Shire of Caboolture to the north-west.
