= Newport, Queensland =

Newport Queensland
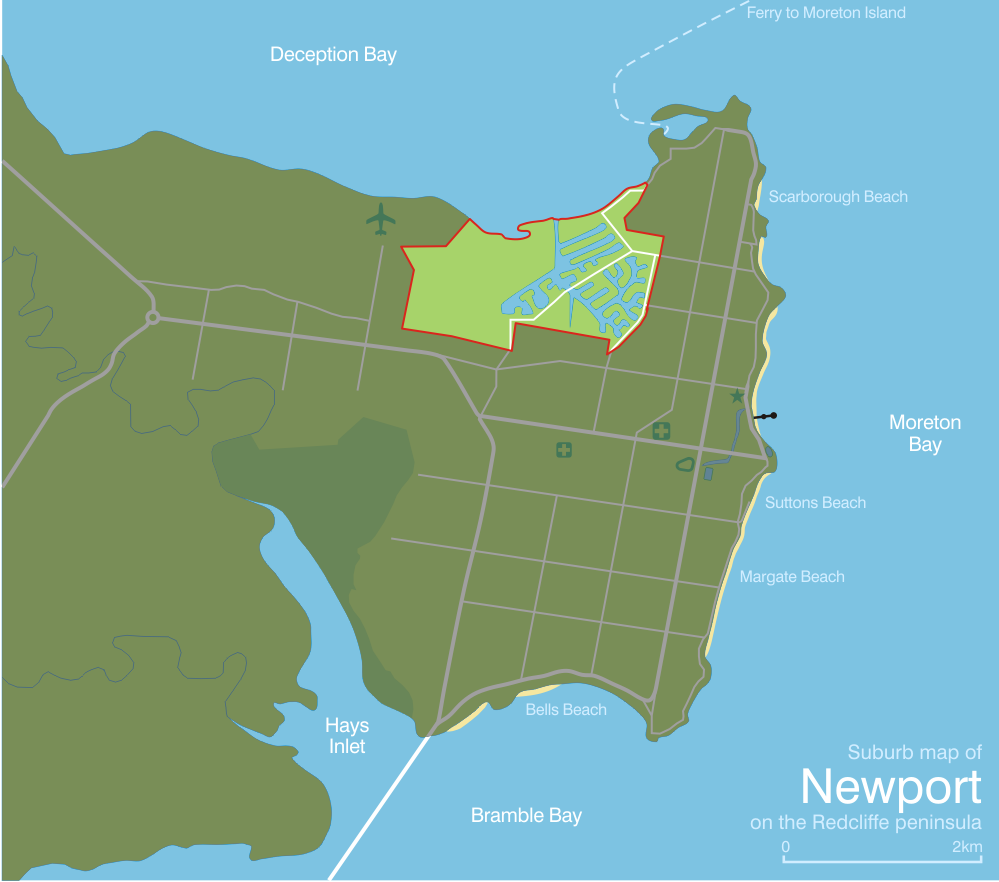

- Coordinates: 27.2111°S 153.0905°E
- Population: 5,964 (2021 census)
  - Density: 1,491/km^{2} (3,860/sq mi)
- Established: 2008
- Postcode(s): 4020
- Area: 4.0 km^{2} (1.5 sq mi)
- Time zone: AEST (UTC+10:00)
- Location: 3.5 km (2 mi) NW of Redcliffe; 40.8 km (25 mi) NNE of Brisbane CBD
- LGA(s): City of Moreton Bay
- State electorate(s): Redcliffe; Murrumba
- Federal division(s): Petrie
Suburbs around Newport:
Deception Bay	Deception Bay	Scarborough
Rothwell	Newport	Scarborough
Kippa-Ring	Kippa-Ring	Redcliffe

Newport is a coastal suburb in the City of Moreton Bay, Queensland, Australia. In the 2021 census, Newport had a population of 5,964 people.

== Geography ==
Newport is at the north of the Redcliffe Peninsula, approximately 29 kilometres (18 mi) north-northeast of Brisbane, the state capital of Queensland, Australia.

== History ==
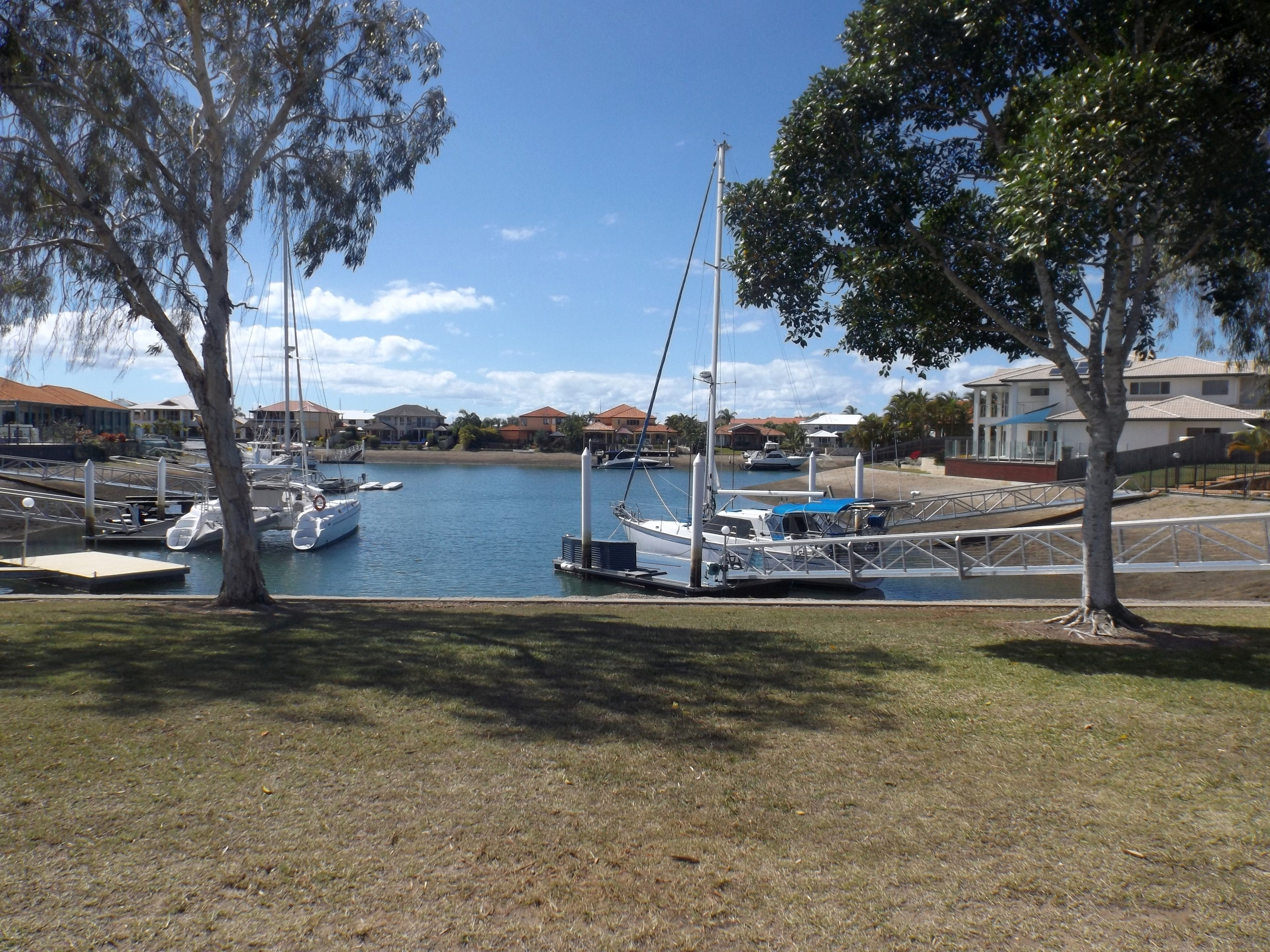
Swan Canal, 2016

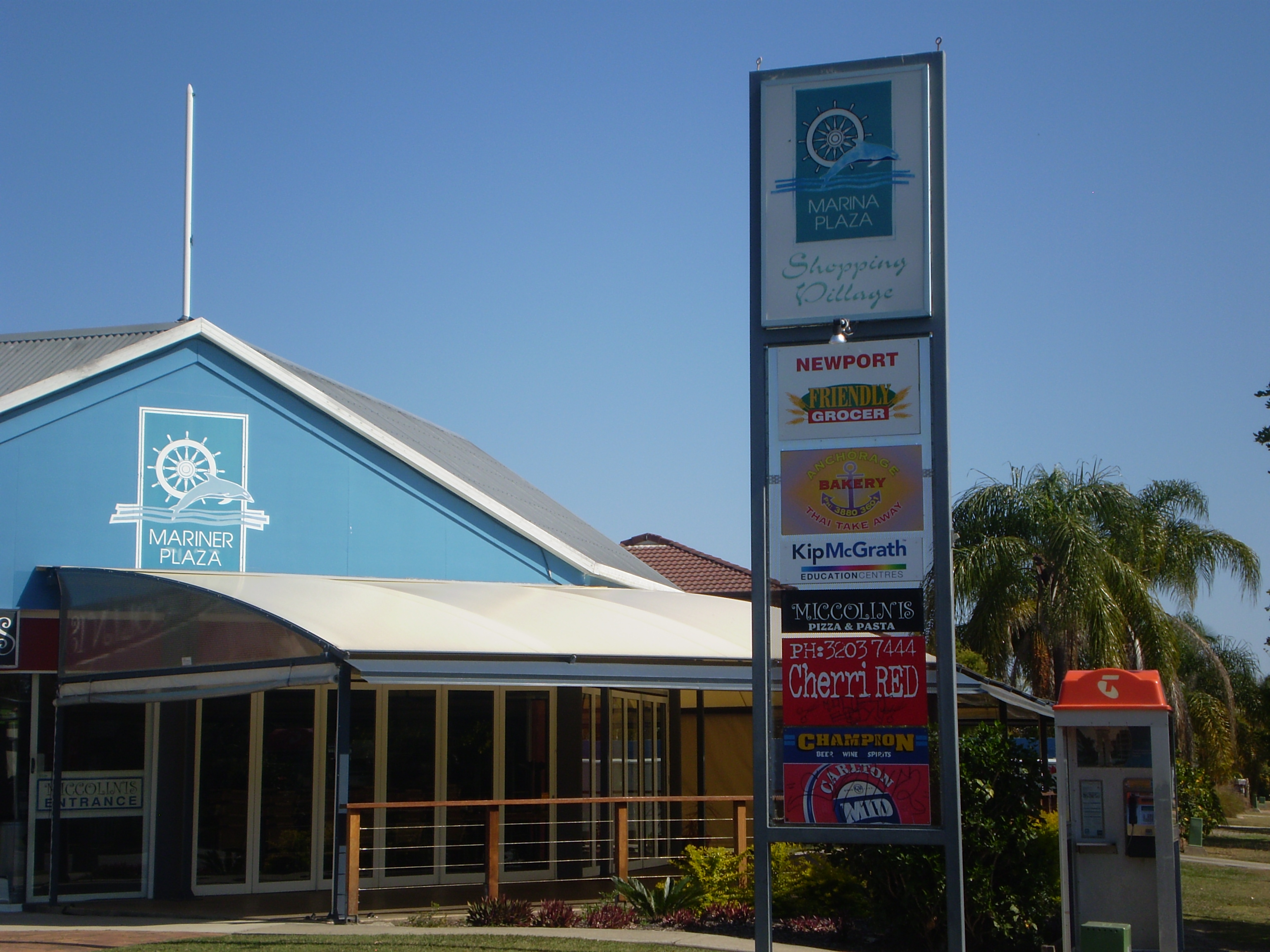
Mariner Plaza

The suburb of Newport was gazetted as the Place Name Decision Notice (No 21) 2008 in the Queensland Government Gazette – Natural Resources and Water on August 15, 2008, after a submission by the then Redcliffe City Council to the Queensland Government Department of Natural Resources and Water in October 2006. An earlier, unsuccessful attempt by the council to create the suburb was made in the 1990s.

Until 2008, Newport was made up of two areas - with that east of Albatross & Walkers Creek Canal being Scarborough, and that on the western side being part of Kippa-Ring. Currently, new land is being cleared and canals being dug out to form the next stage of the suburb to the west of the current established area.

The name Newport comes from the Newport Waterways housing estate that began development in the late 1970s; the artificial canals first filled with water in 1979.

In 1985 the residents of Newport formed the Newport Waterways Property Owners Association Inc (NWPOA) to work with the Redcliffe City Council and Marina developers to maintain the canals and marine environment in a pristine condition. In 1986 following a number of burglaries, the NWPOA established a Neighbour-hood Watch program called "Newport Watch" to improve community security and social services to canal residents.

Newport is home to Spinnaker Park, which was voted Australia's Favourite Playground in 2021.

== Demographics ==
In the 2016 census, Newport had a population of 2,964 people.

In the 2021 census, Newport had a population of 5,964 people.

== Education ==
There are no schools in Newport. The nearest government primary schools are Scarborough State School in neighbouring Scarborough to the north-east and Hercules Road State School in neighbouring Kippa-Ring to the south. The nearest government secondary school is Redcliffe State High School in neighbouring Redcliffe in south-east.

Southern Cross Catholic College is located in Scarborough.

== Amenities ==
There are a number of parks in the area:

- Ashmole Road Park (27.2119°S 153.1029°E)
- Atlanta Court Park (27.2088°S 153.1036°E)
- Boardman Road Park (27.2181°S 153.0854°E)
- Cooper Park (27.2066°S 153.1014°E)
- Hubner Park (27.2055°S 153.0985°E)
- Jim Findlay Park (27.2009°S 153.1024°E)
- Madeleine Court Park (27.2105°S 153.1033°E)
- Morgan Park (27.2074°S 153.1018°E)
- Newport Park (27.2167°S 153.0849°E)
- Southern Cross Park (27.2054°S 153.0959°E)
- Talobilla Park (27.2179°S 153.0921°E)

== See also ==
- Redcliffe Peninsula road network
