= Margate, Queensland =

Margate
- Suburb
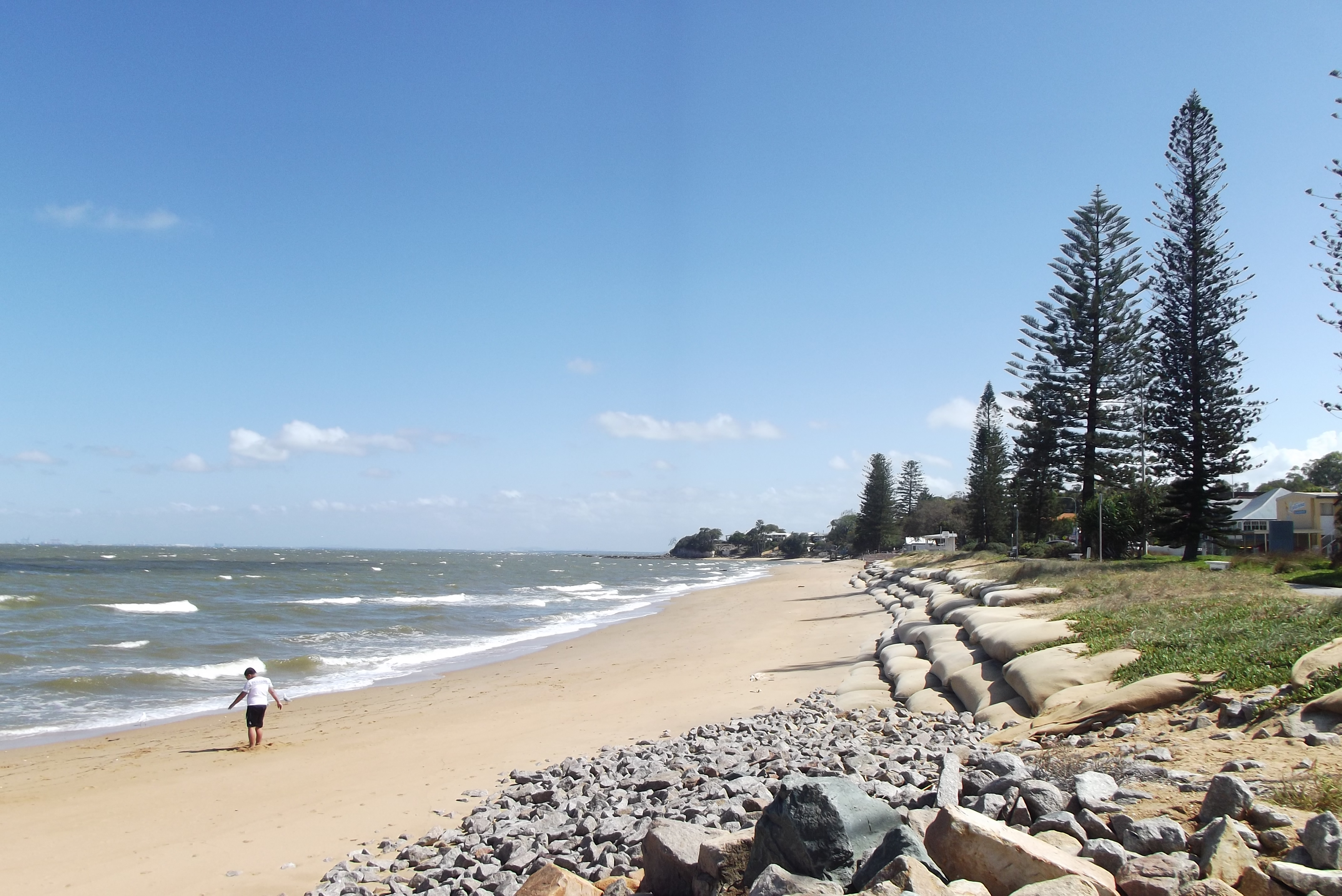
- Beach, Looking South, 2012

- Interactive map of Margate
- Coordinates: 27.2430°S 153.1025°E
- Country: Australia
- State: Queensland
- Region: South East Queensland
- City: Redcliffe
- LGA: City of Moreton Bay
- Location: 2.6 km (1.6 mi) S of Redcliffe; 30.8 km (19.1 mi) NNE of Brisbane CBD

Government
  - State electorate: Redcliffe
  - Federal division: Petrie

Area
  - Total: 2.6 km^{2} (1.0 sq mi)

Population
  - Total: 7,575 (2021 census)
  - Density: 2,910/km^{2} (7,550/sq mi)
- Time zone: UTC+10:00 (AEST)
- Postcode: 4019
Suburbs around Margate
Kippa-Ring	Redcliffe	Redcliffe
Clontarf	Margate	Moreton Bay
Clontarf	Woody Point	Moreton Bay

Margate is a coastal suburb on the Redcliffe Peninsula, and, along with neighbouring coastal suburbs on the Redcliffe Peninsula, is a popular recreational destination for South East Queensland. Margate was part of the City of Redcliffe until 2008, when it was amalgamated into the Moreton Bay Region, now known as the City of Moreton Bay. In the 2021 census, Margate had a population of 7,575 people.

== Geography ==
Margate is in the east of the Redcliffe peninsula, approximately 30.8 kilometres (19.1 mi) by road north-northeast of Brisbane, the state capital of Queensland, Australia.

== History ==
Humpybong Provisional School opened on 1 February 1876 in a site on Elizabeth Avenue near Duffield Road. In 1878 a new school building was erected close to the original site.

The Beaconsfield Estate, Humpy Bong was advertised to be auctioned circa 1880. J. H. Henzell & Co were the auctioneers and there were 64 subdivided allotments on offer. The estate was on Beaconsfield Street, very close to the Esplanade.

In September 1883, 124 subdivided allotments of Dover Estate were advertised to be auctioned by David Love Auctioneer. A map advertising the auction shows that the estate is midway between Scott's Point and Redcliffe Point with a long frontage to the Main Coast Road.

In April 1889, 69 subdivided allotments of McCulloch's Beach Estate were advertised to be auctioned by G. T. Bell Auctioneer. A map advertising the auction shows that the estate was on McCulloch's Avenue and very close to the Esplanade.

In 1909, Humpybong Provisional School was merged with Redcliffe State School and relocated to a more central site where it continued to be called Humpybong State School.

In January 1933, 21 subdivided allotments of Parry-Okeden Estate were advertised to be auctioned by the auctioneers Isles, Love & Col and E. H. Decker acting in conjunction. A map advertising the auction shows that the estate was 1 minute from Margate Beach.

Margate Baptist Mission Church opened on Saturday 23 May 1936. The congregation of the Sandgate Baptist Church purchased land in Margate and then relocated their church hall to the site and renovated it.

Humpybong Infants State School was split from Humpybong State School on 24 August 1959 but was closed on 12 December 1997 and re-integrated back into the state school.

== Demographics ==
In the 2011 census, Margate recorded a population of 7,008 people, 52% female and 48% male. The median age of the Margate population was 42 years, 5 years above the national median of 37. 72% of people living in Margate were born in Australia. The other top responses for country of birth were England 6.6%, New Zealand 5.9%, Scotland 0.9%, Germany 0.7%, Philippines 0.6%. 89.1% of people spoke only English at home; the next most common languages were 0.5% German, 0.4% French, 0.3% Dutch, 0.3% Italian, 0.3% Samoan.

In the 2016 census, Margate had a population of 7,405 people.

In the 2021 census, Margate had a population of 7,575 people.

== Education ==
Humpybong State School is a government primary (Prep–6) school for boys and girls at Ernest Street (27.2462°S 153.1087°E). In 2017, the school had an enrolment of 749 students with 59 teachers (53 full-time equivalent) and 48 non-teaching staff (29 full-time equivalent). It includes a special education program.

There are no secondary schools in Margate. The nearest government secondary schools are Redcliffe State High School to the north in neighbouring Redcliffe and Clontarf Beach State High School to the west in neighbouring Clontarf.

== Amentities ==
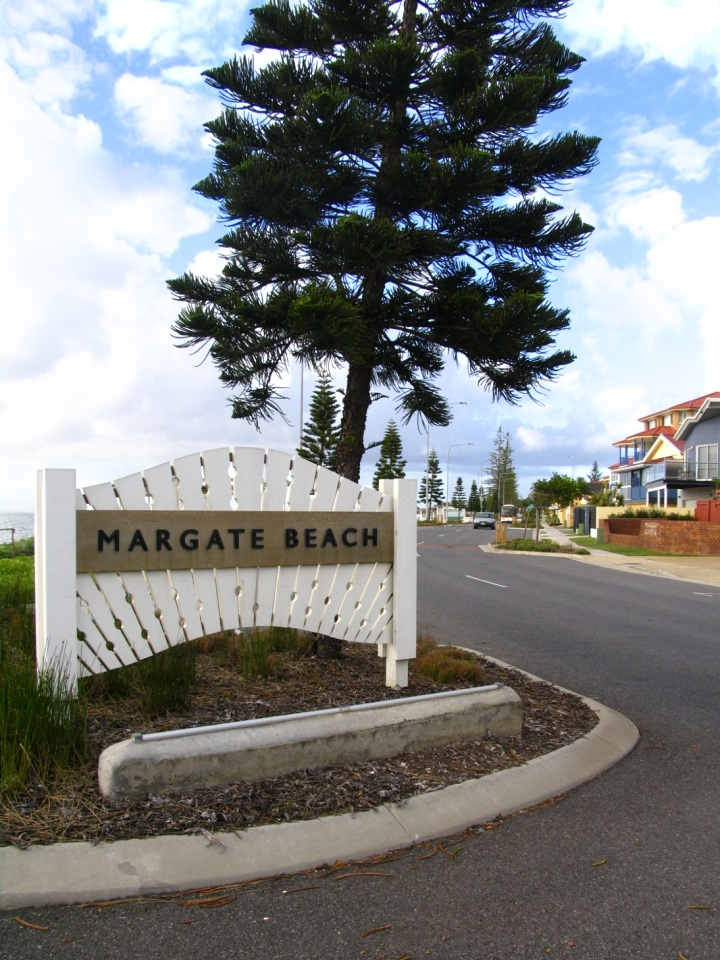
Entrance to Margate Beach

Margate Beach, a 2 km redeveloped stretch spanning the length of the suburb, features a timber boardwalk, viewing shelters and seating, and barbecue facilities, with views to Moreton Island over sandy beaches and Moreton Bay. The redeveloped boardwalk was completed in 2002 in a bid to beautify the area. The boardwalk covers the original cement steps to Margate Beach which are still visible and in use further down the waterfront at Suttons Beach, Redcliffe.

The Margate CBD underwent a $6M major redevelopment aimed at modernising the shopping precinct, making the area more attractive and comfortable, and a distinctive centre with a strong identity. It was completed in November 2007. Margate's urban centre, known as Margate Village is home to a string of retail and commercial businesses including a local shopping centre.

Margate Village provides the higher order retail and commercial role of a centre serving mainly Redcliffe City residents, in comparison to other urban villages in Redcliffe City. Currently, Margate has a building height restriction of six storeys in zoned areas along Duffield Road towards Margate Beach.

The Redcliffe heritage designer-builder Alex Smith constructed a number of buildings in Margate. The last remaining officially recognized construction in Margate by Alex Smith was the Waltzing Matilda Motel. The Waltzing Matilda Motel was recently demolished and a 4-storey luxury apartment building was constructed on the plot of land replacing it. A number of Contemporary-style buildings have also been constructed in Margate, giving it a completely different look compared to what it looked like a few years ago. In 2019–2021, many older buildings were getting demolished to create more modern buildings and houses along Oxley Avenue and nearby streets.

Barry Bolton Park is at 160 Victoria Avenue. It is named after Barry Bolton, a former mayor of the City of Redcliffe.

== See also ==
Redcliffe Peninsula road network
