= Redcliffe Peninsula =

Coordinates: 27.2271°S 153.0878°E

- Town
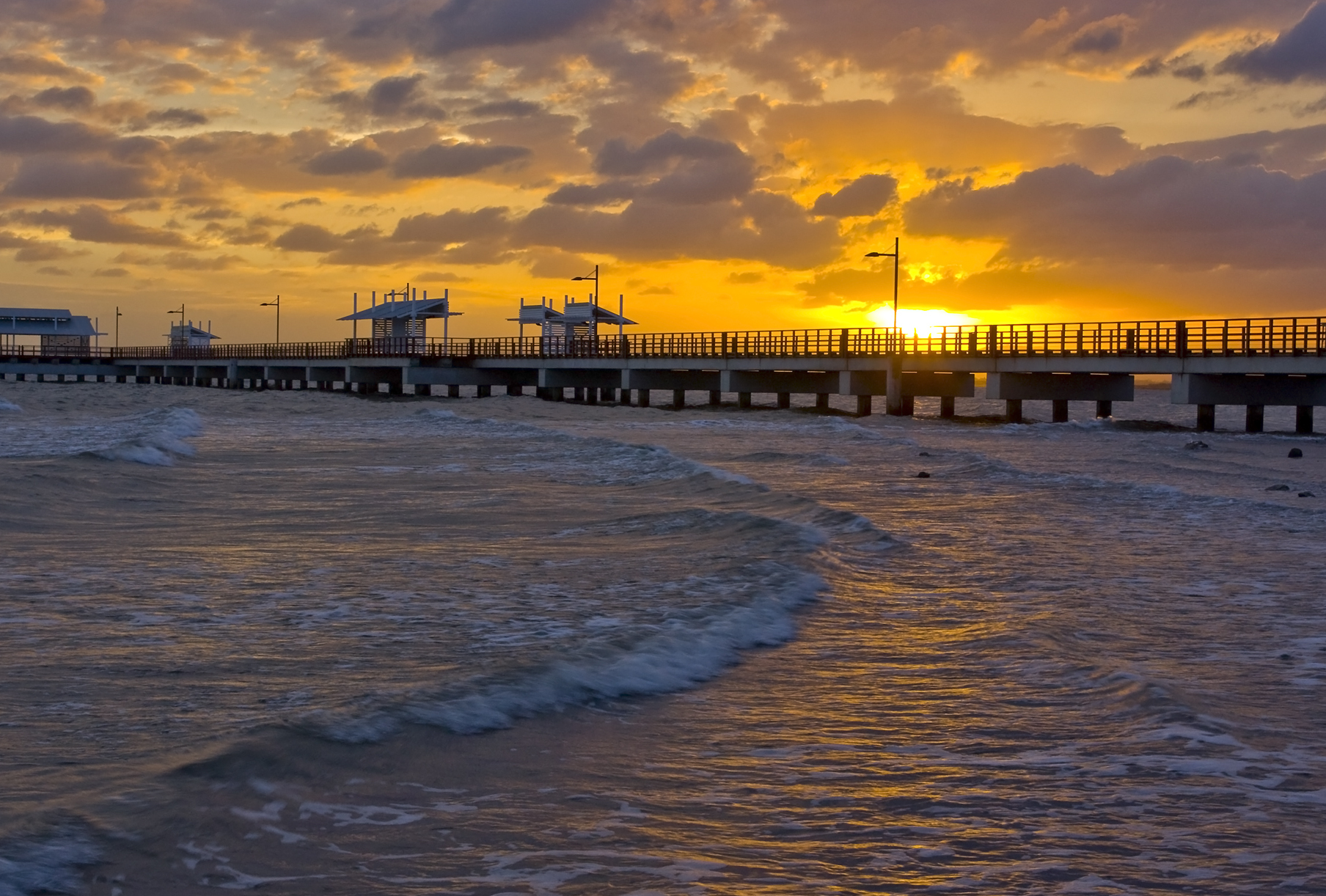
- Woody Point jetty and Moreton Bay at Woody Point

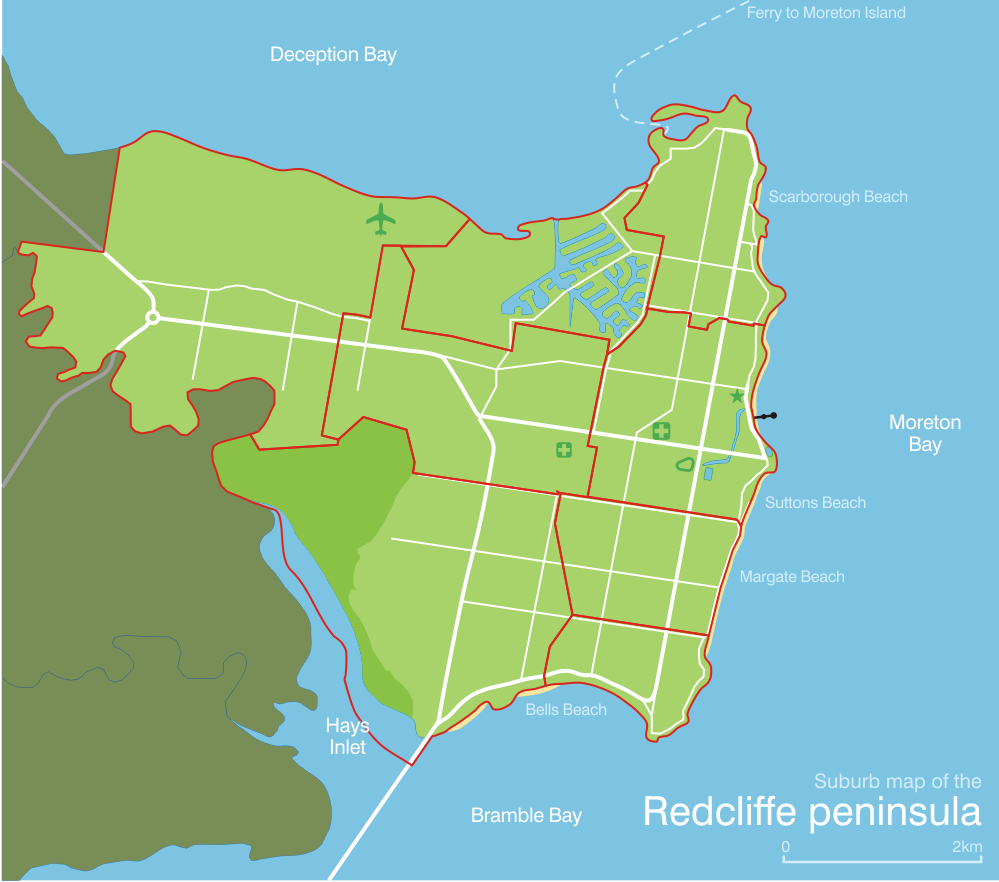
- Suburb map of the Redcliffe peninsula
- Country: Australia
- State: Queensland
- Region: South East Queensland
- LGA: City of Moreton Bay
- Location: 38.7 km (24.0 mi) NNE of Brisbane CBD
- Established: 1824

Government
  - State electorates: Redcliffe; Murrumba
  - Federal division: Petrie

Area
  - Total: 38.1 km^{2} (14.7 sq mi)

Population
  - Total: 59,469 (2016 census)
  - Density: 2,523/km^{2} (6,530/sq mi)
- Time zone: UTC+10 (AEST)

The Redcliffe Peninsula is a peninsula located in the City of Moreton Bay in the northeast of the Brisbane metropolitan area in Queensland, Australia. The area covers the suburbs of Clontarf, Kippa-Ring, Margate, Moreton Island, Newport, Redcliffe, Rothwell, Scarborough, and Woody Point.

Redcliffe was the site of the first European settlement in Queensland, and was previously governed by its own local government area, the City of Redcliffe. Today, it is within the City of Moreton Bay local government area.

As a result of its beaches as well as its coastal, fishing and recreational amenities, the Redcliffe Peninsula is a popular recreational destination within the Brisbane metropolitan area.

Redcliffe Peninsula is home to over 55,000 residents over its total area of 38.1 km^{2} (14.7 sq mi). The peninsula is relatively flat with few areas rising more than 20 m (66 ft) above sea level.

== History ==
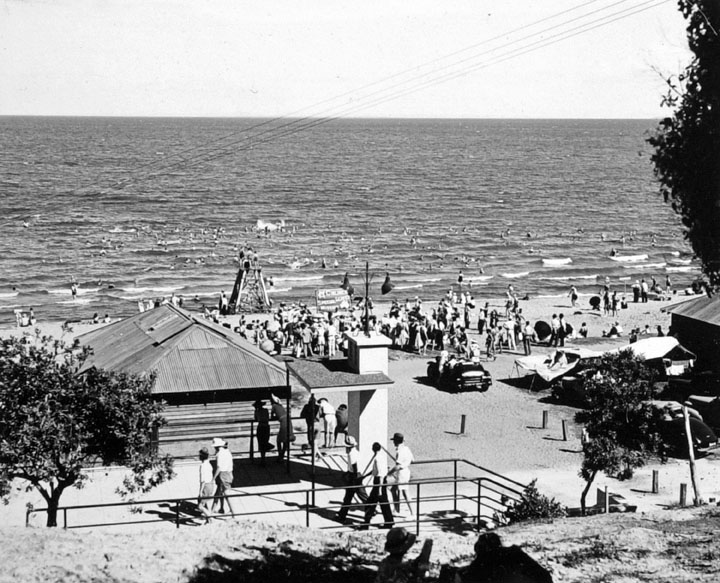
Crowds at Suttons Beach in 1937

The Redcliffe Peninsula was occupied by the indigenous Ningy Ningy people. The native name is Kau-in-Kau-in, which means Blood-Blood (red-like blood).

The area's first European visitors arrived on 17 July 1799, aboard the Norfolk, a British colonial sloop commanded by Matthew Flinders. Flinders explored the Moreton Bay area and landed at 10:30 a.m. at a location he called "Red Cliff Point", after the red-coloured cliffs visible from the bay, today called Woody Point.

In 1823, the Governor of New South Wales, Thomas Brisbane, instructed that a new northern penal settlement be developed, and an exploration party led by John Oxley further explored the Moreton Bay area. Oxley recommended Red Cliff Point for the new colony, reporting that ships could land at any tide and easily get close to the shore.

The settlement, along the banks of what is now called Humpybong Creek in Redcliffe town centre, consisted of small, temporary dwellings with gardens and vegetables planted. However the lack of a reliable water supply, attacks by Aboriginal people, large mosquito numbers, and insufficient facilities for safe anchorage meant that the settlement needed to be moved after eight months. The settlement relocated to the banks of the Brisbane River at North Quay, 28 kilometres (17.4 mi) south. Redcliffe was then abandoned, with just a small number of dwellings remaining. Local Aboriginal people called these empty buildings "oompie bongs", anglicised to mean, in reverse, 'dead house', and the name was given to the entire Redcliffe peninsula.

The area was designated as an agricultural reserve in the 1860s, and residential development began in the 1880s. The population grew significantly after 1935 when the Hornibrook Bridge was opened; the two lane, 2.8 kilometres (1.7 mi) bridge crossed Bramble Bay and linked the peninsula with a more direct route to Brisbane. A replacement three lane bridge, the Houghton Highway, opened in 1979. On 11 July 2010 the new three lane Ted Smout Memorial Bridge opened, and at 2.7 kilometres (1.7 mi) is claimed to be Australia's longest. The bridge was named to honour Queensland's longest surviving World War 1 Digger. It provides south-bound traffic flow as well as pedestrian and bicycle access, while the Houghton Highway has become a dedicated north-bound traffic bridge.

The Redcliffe Library opened in 2000.

In 2007 the Queensland Government's Local Government Reform Commission announced that Redcliffe would be amalgamated into the adjoining Pine Rivers and Caboolture shires to form the Moreton Bay Region, which was renamed the City of Moreton Bay in July 2023.

== Climate ==
Redcliffe has a humid subtropical climate under the Köppen climate classification system, with hot, humid summers and dry, mild winters. Thunderstorms are regular events from late Spring to early Autumn in the late afternoon to early evening. The more severe storms are accompanied by damaging hail stones, torrential rain and destructive winds, however as most storms travel in a north-east direction from past Ipswich then over greater Brisbane, they often lose strength by the time they arrive to Redcliffe.

Climate data for Redcliffe
Month	Jan	Feb	Mar	Apr	May	Jun	Jul	Aug	Sep	Oct	Nov	Dec	Year
Mean daily maximum °C (°F)	29.0 (84.2)	28.5 (83.3)	27.7 (81.9)	25.6 (78.1)	23.3 (73.9)	21.2 (70.2)	20.6 (69.1)	21.4 (70.5)	24.1 (75.4)	25.3 (77.5)	26.6 (79.9)	28.0 (82.4)	25.1 (77.2)
Mean daily minimum °C (°F)	21.9 (71.4)	21.6 (70.9)	20.2 (68.4)	17.7 (63.9)	14.9 (58.8)	11.6 (52.9)	10.6 (51.1)	11.1 (52.0)	14.1 (57.4)	16.5 (61.7)	18.7 (65.7)	20.7 (69.3)	16.6 (61.9)
Average precipitation mm (inches)	111.6 (4.39)	160.9 (6.33)	126.8 (4.99)	124.4 (4.90)	89.0 (3.50)	59.9 (2.36)	51.3 (2.02)	39.7 (1.56)	30.2 (1.19)	70.5 (2.78)	101.6 (4.00)	117.8 (4.64)	1,064.1 (41.89)
Source: Bureau of Meteorology

== Landmarks ==
Photographs of Redcliffe City

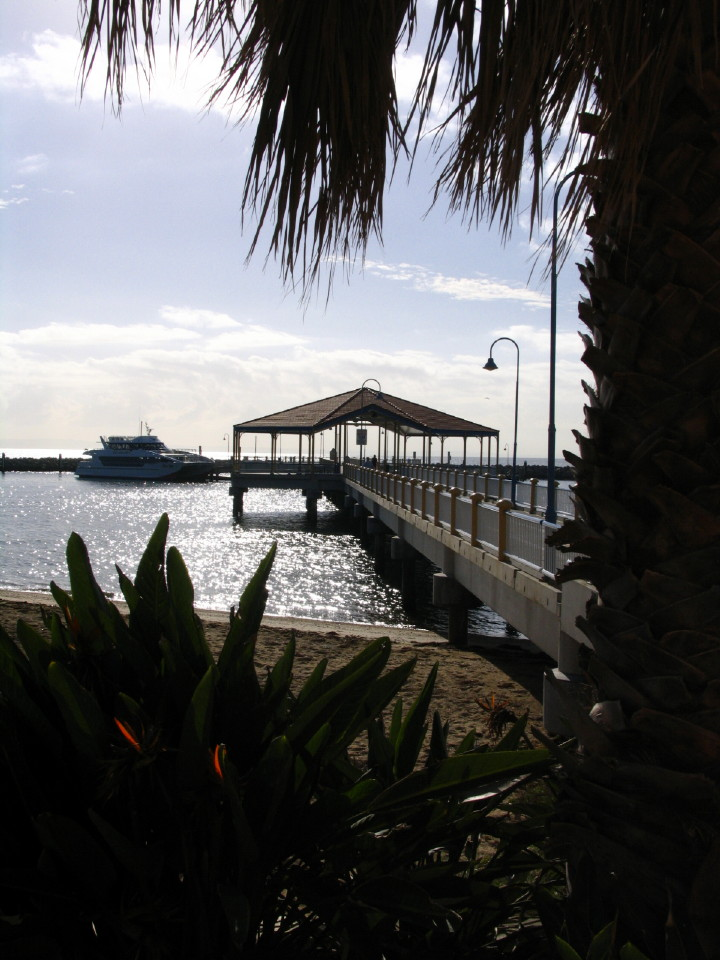
Redcliffe Jetty

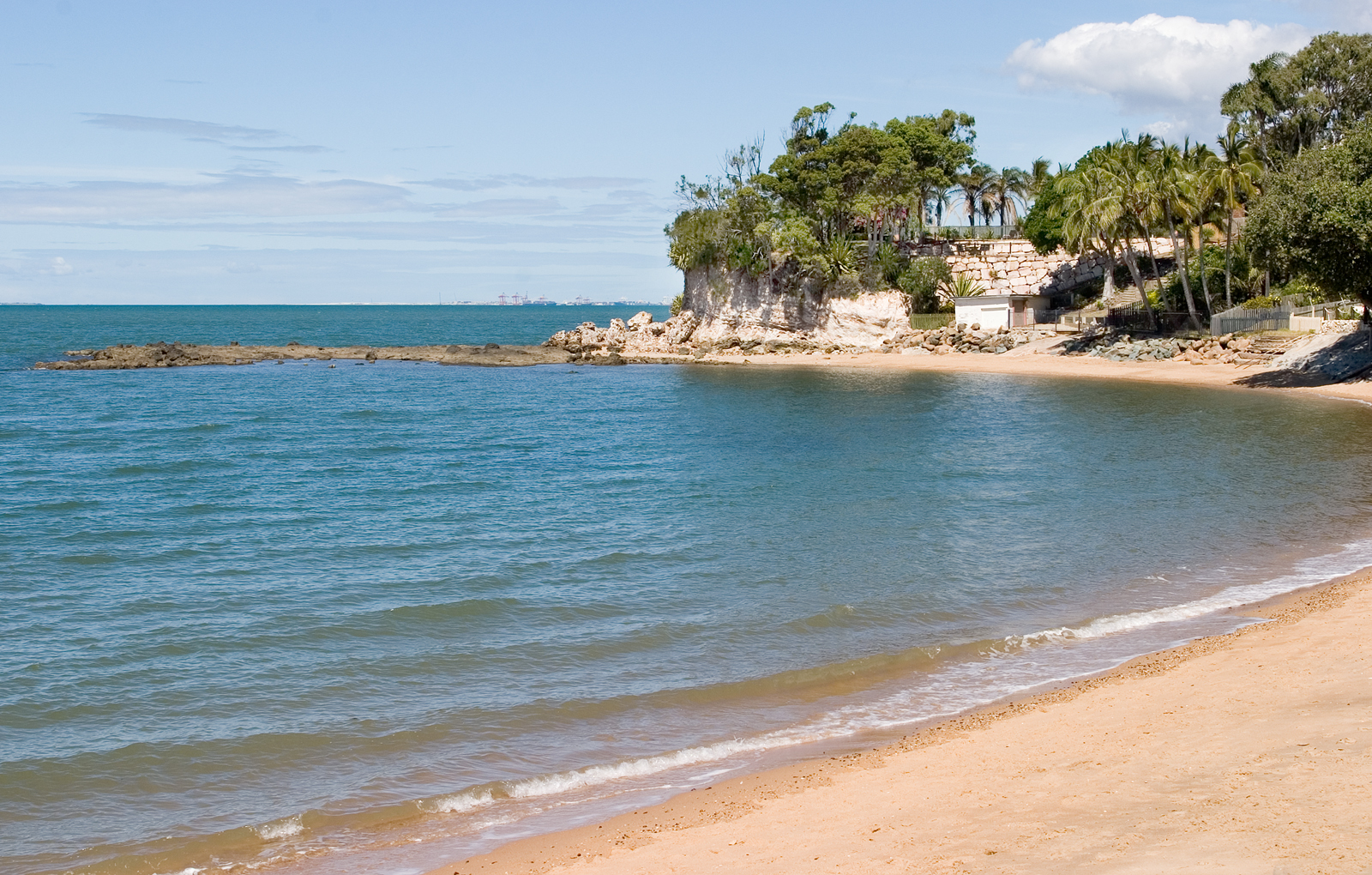
Scotts Point Beach at Woody Point

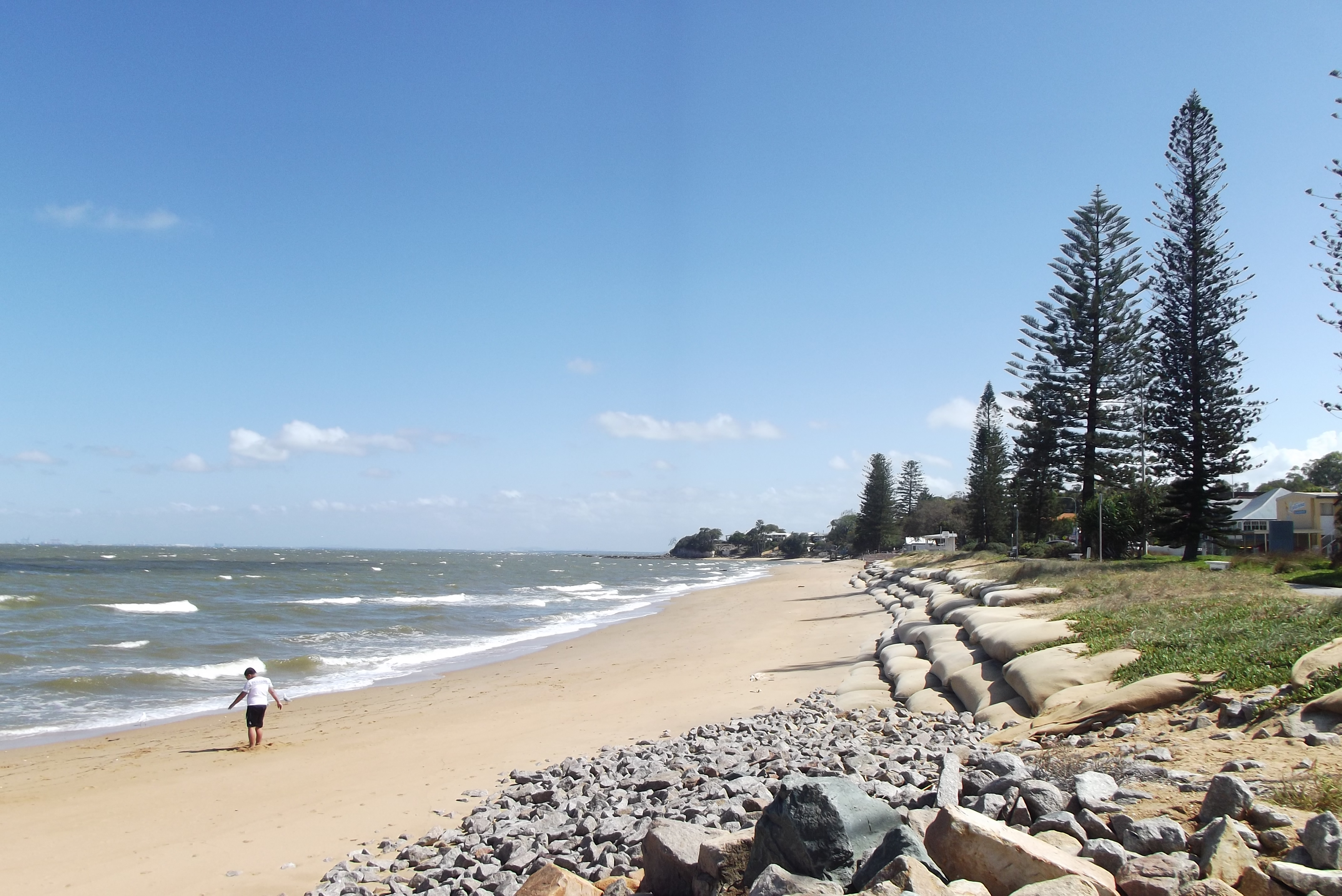
Margate Beach at Margate

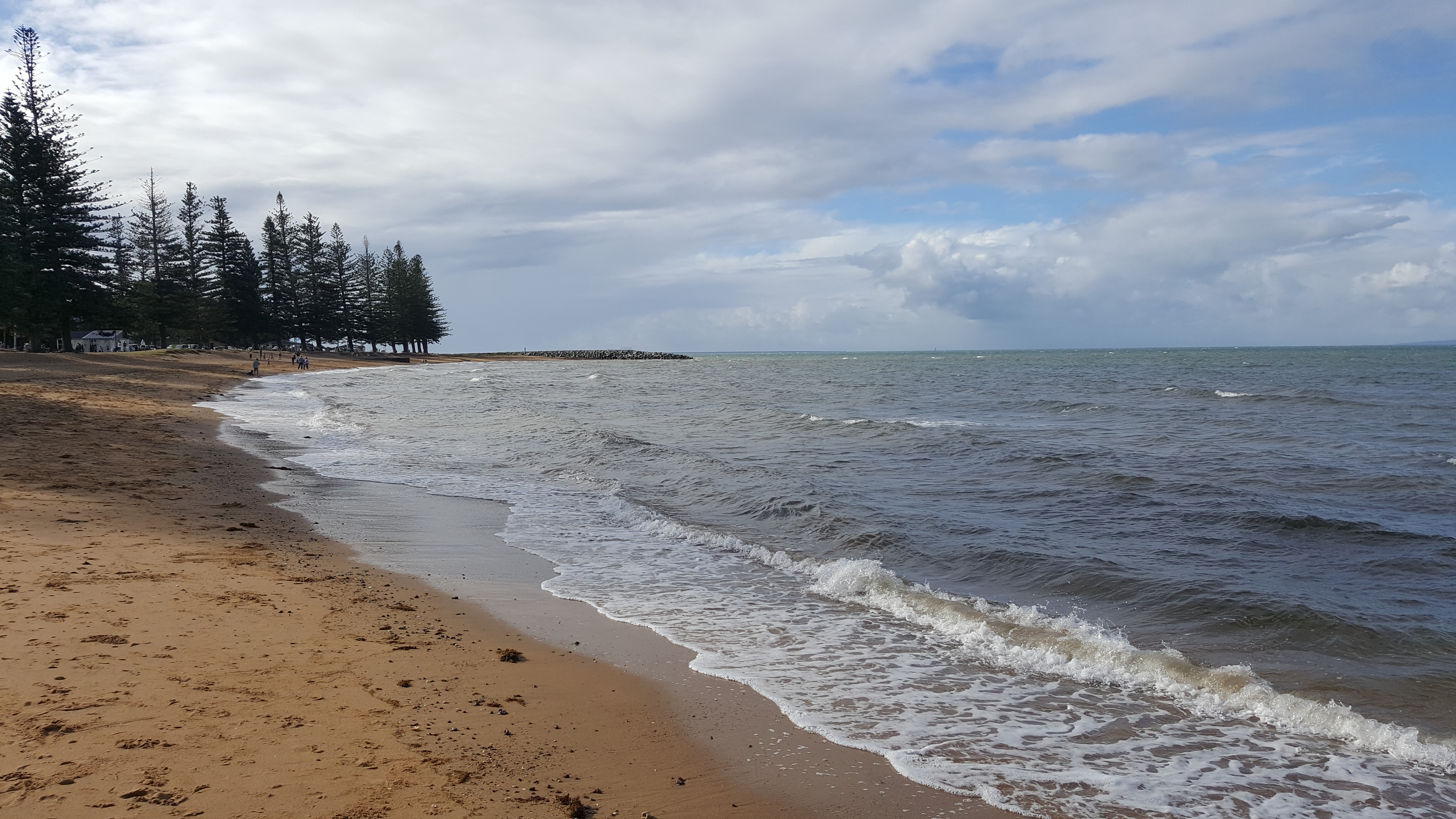
Scarborough Beach at Scarborough

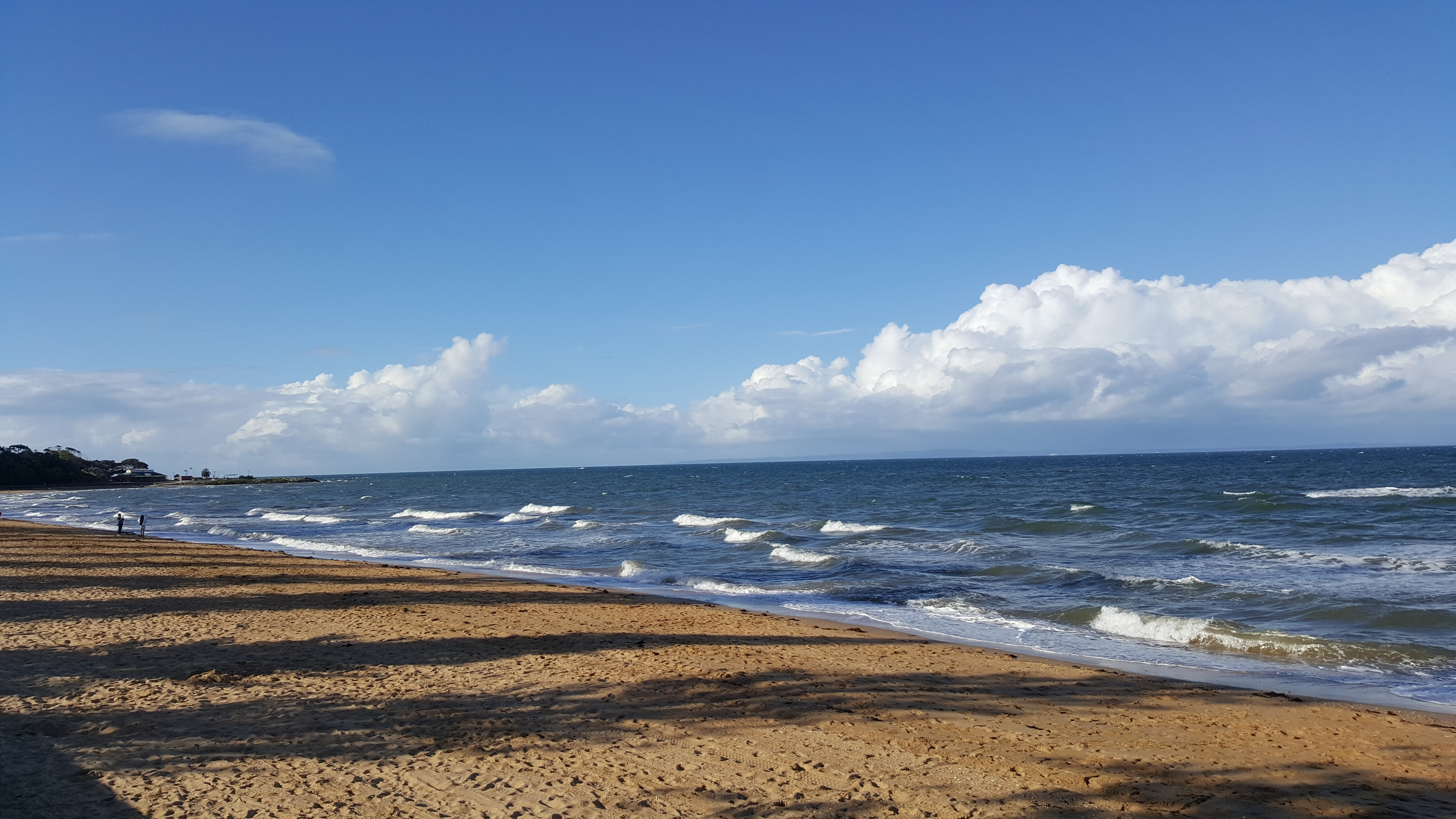
Suttons Beach at Redcliffe

There are a number of landmarks located in Redcliffe, such as the Redcliffe Jetty, Settlement Cove Lagoon, Suttons and Margate Beaches, Scarborough Beach Park with its Cottonwood trees, Redcliffe Museum, Woody Point Jetty, HMQS Gayundah shipwreck, and two bridges that have become iconic to Redcliffe, the Houghton Highway and Ted Smout Memorial Bridge, which links Redcliffe to the Brisbane suburb of Brighton. Redcliffe features many buildings by the heritage designer-builder Alex Smith. On 14 February 2013 the Bee Gees Way in the Redcliffe CBD was opened and features a statue of the Bee Gees in their youth as residents of Redcliffe. The Bee Gees Way was formerly a pathway that was gazetted for weekend markets.

The City of Moreton Bay operates a public library at 476 Oxley Avenue, Redcliffe.

== Moreton Bay ==
Redcliffe City acts as a service centre for the Moreton Bay island communities, a tourist hub for the bay, and base of operations for local fishing and the seafood industry. From Redcliffe visitors can access Moreton Island via a new passenger ferry that has replaced the old Combie Trader ferry, Deception Bay waters, Bramble Bay, Hays Inlet and the Pine River leading to the North and South Pine rivers. The major marina in Redcliffe is Scarborough Marina, located in the Scarborough Boat Harbour, at the northern tip of the Peninsula; Newport Waterways Marina is nearby.

== Economy ==
The major economical sectors of Redcliffe are retail trade, construction trades, medical and community services, and property and business services, followed by automotive, manufacturing, and cafés, hotels, restaurants and takeaways. The 250-bed Redcliffe Hospital is a major employer. Fishing and prawning are the principal primary industries, with mostly light industries located at Clontarf and Kippa-Ring.

Tourism is an important industry to the area with approximately 1.2 million tourists visiting each year. This focus on tourism has existed since the late 1800s when people came by boat to enjoy its safe, sheltered and sandy beaches.

The major shopping areas are the Redcliffe Seaside Village (Redcliffe Parade & Sutton Street) with shops, restaurants, cafes, a 7D Cinema, and the Bluewater Square Shopping Centre housing a Woolworths. The Peninsula Fair and Kippa-Ring Shopping Centres are built side by side in Kippa-Ring in the centre of the Peninsula and boast the area's dominant retail centre with over 120 specialty stores between them, including Kmart, Target, Woolworths, Coles, Best & Less and Hoyts Cinemas.

Smaller shopping centres are at Margate, Scarborough, Woody Point, Clontarf and Rothwell. The Newport development has proposed a new retail and town centre for the suburb which is currently lacking its own local services.

== Sport, recreation and events ==
A seaside location with 22 kilometres (14 mi) of coastline and a mainly working class population, Redcliffe has a high emphasis on sport and recreation. More than 35 kilometres (22 mi) of dedicated bikeways surround the peninsula, and local sporting clubs include baseball, croquet, golf, hockey, lawn bowls, netball, softball, tennis, rugby, soccer, Australian rules football, and touch football. Scouting and Guiding groups are also in Redcliffe.

Most weekends free-fall tandem skydivers can be seen dropping from 14,000 feet (4,300 m), landing onto Suttons Beach. The operator uses a Cessna 208 Caravan, holding up to ten people, that departs from local Redcliffe Airport.

Kite flying with the Queensland Kite Flyers Society is held twice a month at Pelican Park on Hornibrook Esplanade, Clontarf. Each May, the council hosts a large kite-flying event called Kitefest.

The Redcliffe Dolphins is a rugby league club that competes in the Queensland Cup. The team's ground Dolphin Oval is in Kippa-Ring. The Dolphins have been accepted by the Australian Rugby League to compete in the 2023 NRL premiership competition.

Peninsula Power Football Club is a football (soccer) club in Redcliffe. Formed in 2000 from a merger between Margate and Redcliffe Soccer Clubs, the team competes in the Brisbane Premier League.

The Redcliffe Padres are located at Talobilla Park in Kippa Ring.

Scuba divers can be seen diving from local shore sites Queens Reef in Scarborough, and the Redcliffe jetty in the town centre, as well as several boats which depart for diving in the wider Moreton Bay area.

To celebrate the start of the Brisbane to Gladstone yacht race, the Festival of Sails event is held yearly on Good Friday.

In September, Redcliffe celebrates its history and status as Queensland's first European settlement location with an annual First Settlement Festival.

Redcliffe Clay Target Club hosts events 3rd Sunday of the month and is open to visitors every Saturday

== Transport ==
Bus public transport is provided by local company Hornibrook Bus Lines. Services include local routes within the city area, to the Brisbane central business district via Pine Rivers Shire and Petrie railway station, to Sandgate railway station via Brighton with connecting QR Citytrain services to Brisbane, and a weekday direct Cityxpress service with limited stopping. Kangaroo Bus Lines provides a connection from Redcliffe to Caboolture via Deception Bay and Morayfield.

Road taxi services are provided by Redcliffe Taxi Service.

A heavy rail Citytrain passenger service to Kippa-Ring opened in October 2016.

The Redcliffe Airport is an aerodrome straddling the Kippa-Ring and Rothwell suburb boundaries, just south of the Deception Bay inlet from Moreton Bay. With an 853 m runway (07/25), it is owned and operated by the Moreton Bay City Council. The Redcliffe Aero Club is based at the airport and provides pilot training, aircraft hire and charter services.

=== Roads ===
A group of roads provides access to the Redcliffe Peninsula and enables travel between the contained communities. These roads ensure continuity of access in times of flooding or other natural disasters, and during planned maintenance activities.

== Local media ==
Redcliffe has a weekly local newspaper, the Redcliffe and Bayside Herald, a Quest Community Newspapers masthead owned by News Corporation. Another local news source is community website redcliffecity.com.au, developed by local woman Lynda Roberts of The Redcliffe City News Pty Ltd, supplemented with a limited distribution of a paper publication via local businesses.

Community radio station 99 Seven is based in Redcliffe and covers the city and surrounding Pine Rivers and northern Brisbane suburbs. The station, founded in 1986, broadcasts on the 99.7 MHz FM frequency (4RED) and offers a broad range of genres in programming and music.

== Notable people from Redcliffe ==
Barry, Maurice and Robin Gibb moved to Redcliffe in the late 1950s and formed the Bee Gees.

Actors William McInnes and Nikki Osborne come from Redcliffe. The film Swimming Upstream starring Geoffrey Rush used the Redcliffe War Memorial Pool as one of its locations.

Redcliffe has a high number of Olympic Games athletes from its relatively small population, including swimmers Leisel Jones, Geoff Huegill, Jessicah Schipper and Tarnee White who trained in Scarborough under coach Ken Wood. Chelsea Forkin played in the 2020 Olympic Games for the national softball team.

Current Kookaburras Head Coach (Australian Men's Hockey Team) – Graham Reid played all his junior hockey with Redcliffe during the 1970s attended both Scarborough and Clontarf state schools and began his coaching career coaching Redcliffe to a premiership in 1989.

Rugby league players Arthur Beetson, Petero Civoniceva, Michael Crocker, Adam Mogg, Travis Norton, Tom Opacic, Brent Tate and Daly Cherry-Evans were either born in Redcliffe or started their sporting careers from playing here.

Author Kim Wilkins grew up in Redcliffe.

== Sister cities ==
The City of Redcliffe, through the Redcliffe City Council, has two Sister City arrangements:

- Japan – Sanyō-Onoda, Yamaguchi
- Australia – Winton, Queensland

== See also ==
Redcliffe Peninsula road network
