= Redcliffe Airport (Queensland) =

Airport in Queensland, Australia

Redcliffe Aerodrome
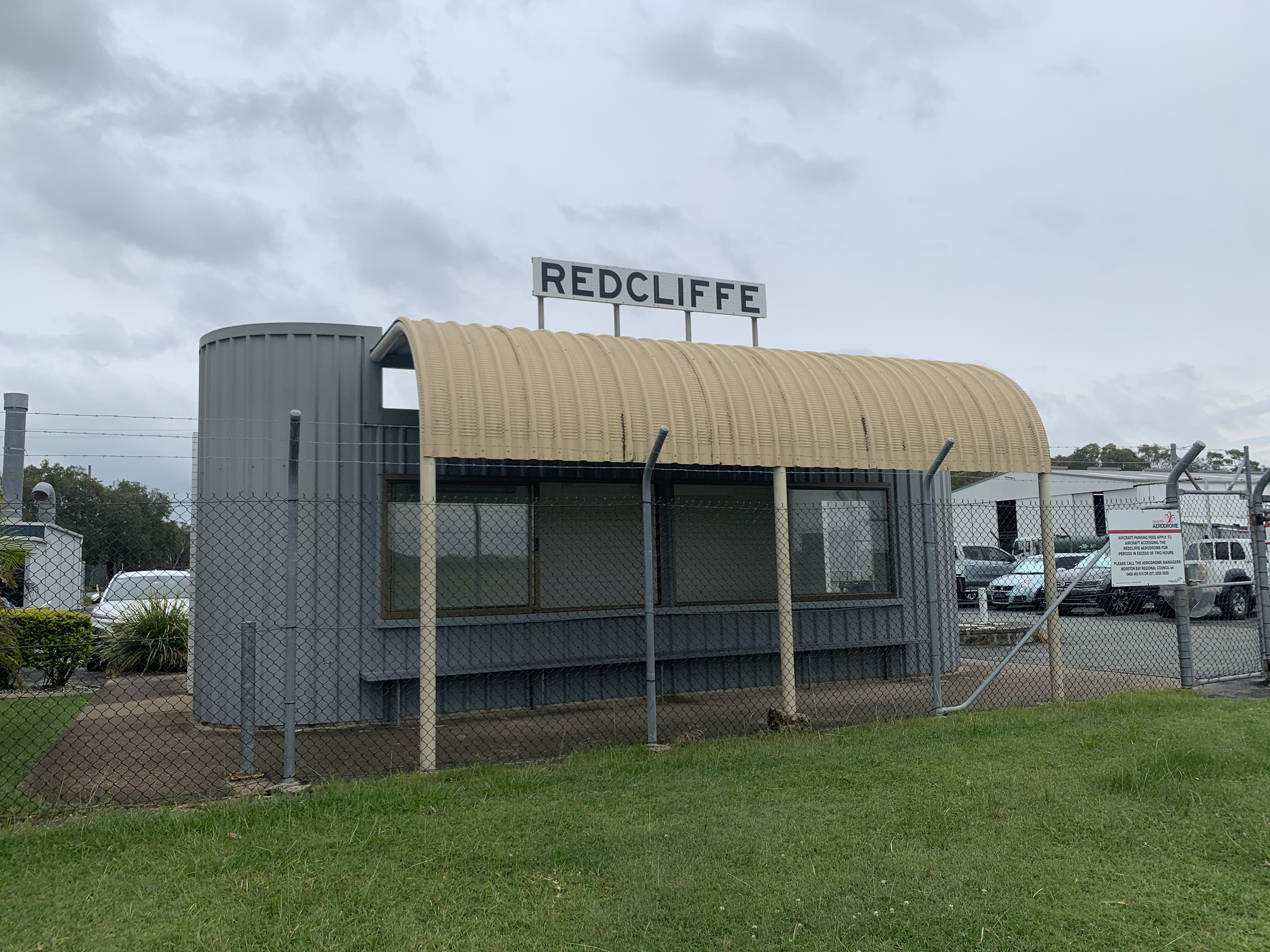
- Redcliffe Airport terminal, 2023
- IATA: none; ICAO: YRED

Summary
- Airport type: Public
- Owner/Operator: Moreton Bay City Council
- Serves: Redcliffe Peninsula, Queensland, Australia
- Location: Rothwell
- Elevation AMSL: 7 ft (2.1 m)
- Coordinates: 27.2065°S 153.0693°E
- Website: Redcliffe Aerodrome

Map
- Location in Queensland

Runways
Direction	Length		Surface
Direction	m	ft	Surface
07/25	853	2,799	Asphalt
- Sources: AIP

Redcliffe Airport (ICAO: YRED) is an aerodrome serving Redcliffe in the City of Moreton Bay, Queensland, Australia. It is located 2.5 nautical miles (4.6 km; 2.9 mi) northwest of Redcliffe, on Wirraway Drive in Rothwell, accessed via Nathan Road. The facility is owned and operated by Moreton Bay City Council, following the amalgamation of the Redcliffe City Council.

== Facilities ==
The airport resides at an elevation of 7 ft (2 m) above sea level and has one runway designated 07/25 which measures 853 m × 18 m (2,799 ft × 59 ft). It is equipped with pilot activated low intensity runway lighting for night operations and the aerodrome also has refuelling facilities. There is no control tower and pilots must co-ordinate aircraft movements using a Common Traffic Advisory Frequency (CTAF).

The airfield is home to a number of aviation training schools and aircraft maintenance facilities that service the South East Queensland region. Emergency and medical transfer aircraft now meet ambulances at the airfield since the closure of the Redcliffe Hospital Helipad in 2014.

Each year in August for World Helicopter Day a large open day event is held and is one of the biggest helicopter events in the southern hemisphere.

Fuel services at the airfield include bowsers for Jet A1 and AVGAS.

The airport has an online weather station provided by the local community for advisory weather.

== Airlines and destinations ==
The airport only serves general aviation, there are no scheduled flights.

== Urban Encroachment ==
Like many small town airports, Redcliffe Airport has slowly seen residential development approved that places houses in what has previously been buffer zones or wetlands. Users of the airfield have set up a noise monitoring program to help identify noise hotspots and to educate local residents on the noise-abatement procedures already adhered to by pilots.

== See also ==
- List of airports in Queensland
