= Kippa-Ring, Queensland =

Kippa-Ring
- Suburb
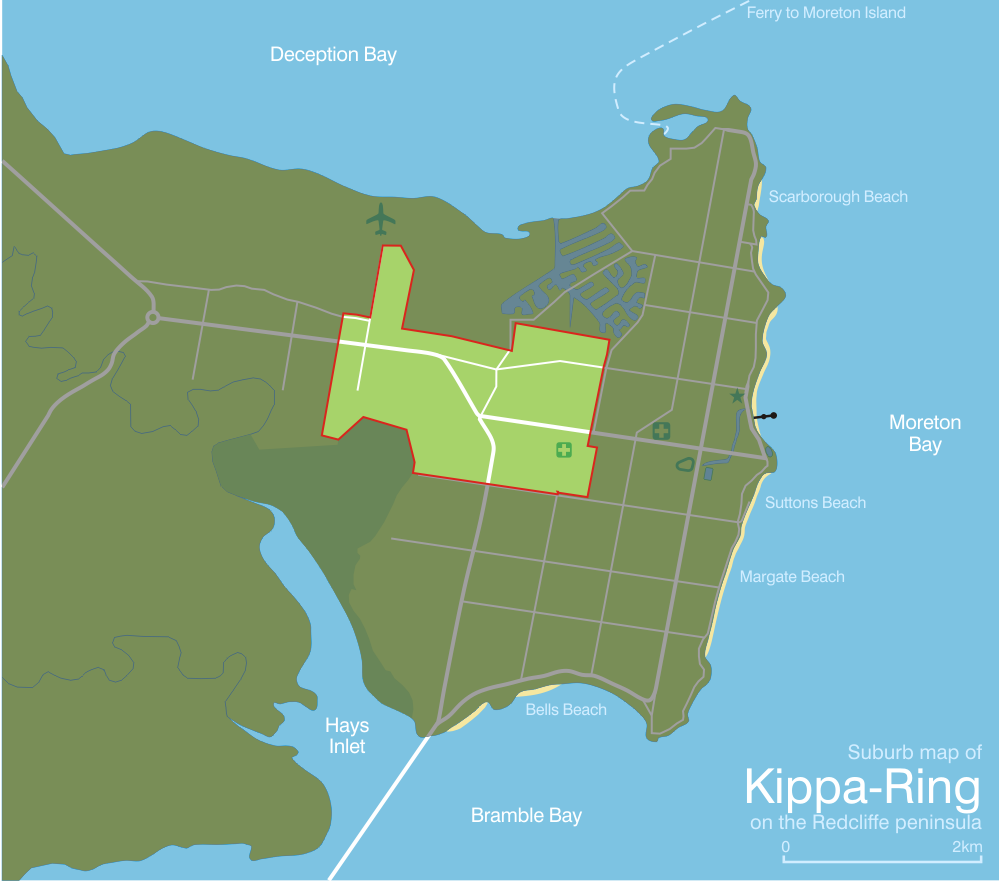

- Interactive map of Kippa-Ring
- Coordinates: 27.2255°S 153.0844°E
- Country: Australia
- State: Queensland
- Region: South East Queensland
- LGA: City of Moreton Bay
- Location: 2.9 km (1.8 mi) W of Redcliffe; 18.1 km (11.2 mi) NE of Strathpine; 31.5 km (19.6 mi) NNE of Brisbane CBD
- Established: 1971

Government
  - State electorates: Murrumba; Redcliffe
  - Federal division: Petrie

Area
  - Total: 5.4 km^{2} (2.1 sq mi)
- Elevation: 6 m (20 ft)

Population
  - Total: 9,745 (2021 census)
  - Density: 1,805/km^{2} (4,670/sq mi)
- Time zone: UTC+10:00 (AEST)
- Postcode: 4021
Suburbs around Kippa-Ring
Rothwell	Newport	Redcliffe
Rothwell	Kippa-Ring	Redcliffe
Clontarf	Clontarf	Margate

Kippa-Ring is a suburb in the City of Moreton Bay, Queensland, Australia. In the 2021 census, Kippa-Ring had a population of 9,745 people.

== Geography ==
Kippa-Ring is located in the centre of the Redcliffe Peninsula, 2.9 kilometres (1.8 mi) by road west of Redcliffe and 31.5 kilometres (19.6 mi) by road north-north-east of Brisbane, the state capital. Designated as the commercial, retail and financial centre for the Redcliffe region, Kippa-Ring houses the bulk of the commercial and retail sectors on the peninsula including the largest shopping centres.

Kippa-Ring railway station is in Hindmarsh Street (27.2253°S 153.0826°E). It is the terminus of the Redcliffe Peninsula railway line.

== History ==
The suburb's name is a combination of the Kabi indigenous word "kippa", meaning young uninitiated man, and ring, a reference to a bora ring.

Old maps referred to this bora ring as a place of reference, and long before Kippa-Ring became an official suburb, it was given to the area. Notably, the swampy land in the north of the suburb was referred to as the 'Kippering Swamp' or 'Kippering Flats' – later to become a part of the canal development of Newport.

Until the 1950s and 1960s, Kippa-Ring was largely undeveloped, with most of the land being used for farming or small scale commercial use. In the 1960s and 1970s many areas were developed as residential and the suburb was created officially in 1971.

Kippa-Ring State School was opened on 25 January 1960.

Hercules Road State School opened on 27 January 1976.

== Demographics ==
In the 2016 census, Kippa-Ring had a population of 9,790 people. Aboriginal and Torres Strait Islander people made up 4.0% of the population. 71.5% of people were born in Australia. The next most common countries of birth were New Zealand 7.2%, England 5.1% and Philippines 1.2%. 86.5% of people spoke only English at home. The most common responses for religion were No Religion 30.2%, Catholic 21.3% and Anglican 15.7%.

In the 2021 census, Kippa-Ring had a population of 9,745 people.

== Heritage listings ==
Kippa-Ring has the following heritage-listings:

- Anzac Avenue (the road itself)

== Education ==
Kippa-Ring State School is a government primary (Prep–6) school for boys and girls at 400 Elizabeth Avenue (27.2304°S 153.0864°E). In 2018, the school had an enrolment of 355 students with 30 teachers (24 full-time equivalent) and 22 non-teaching staff (15 full-time equivalent). It includes a special education program.

Hercules Road State School is a government primary (Prep–6) school for boys and girls at Hercules Road (27.2209°S 153.0793°E). In 2018, the school had an enrolment of 903 students with 66 teachers (61 full-time equivalent) and 40 non-teaching staff (26 full-time equivalent). It includes a special education program.

Southern Cross Catholic College has one of its three primary (Prep–6) campus for boys and girls at 110 Nottingham Street in Kippa-Ring (27.2199°S 153.0686°E); the school's main campus is in Scarborough. It is adjacent to the Holy Cross Catholic Church. In 2018, the school (across all campuses) had an enrolment of 1,555 students with 121 teachers (106.4 full-time equivalent) and 90 non-teaching staff (61.6 full-time equivalent).

ACE Positive Learning Centre is a specific purpose primary (3–7) school at Edmund Street (27.2316°S 153.0877°E). Positive Learning Centre accepts students who require intervention not possible in a conventional classroom and works towards reintegrating the students into a conventional classroom or towards vocational pathways.

There are no secondary schools in Kippa-Ring. The nearest government secondary schools are Redcliffe State High School in neighbouring Redcliffe to the east, Clontarf Beach State High School in neighbouring Clontarf to the south, and Deception Bay State High School in Deception Bay to north-west.

== Amenities ==
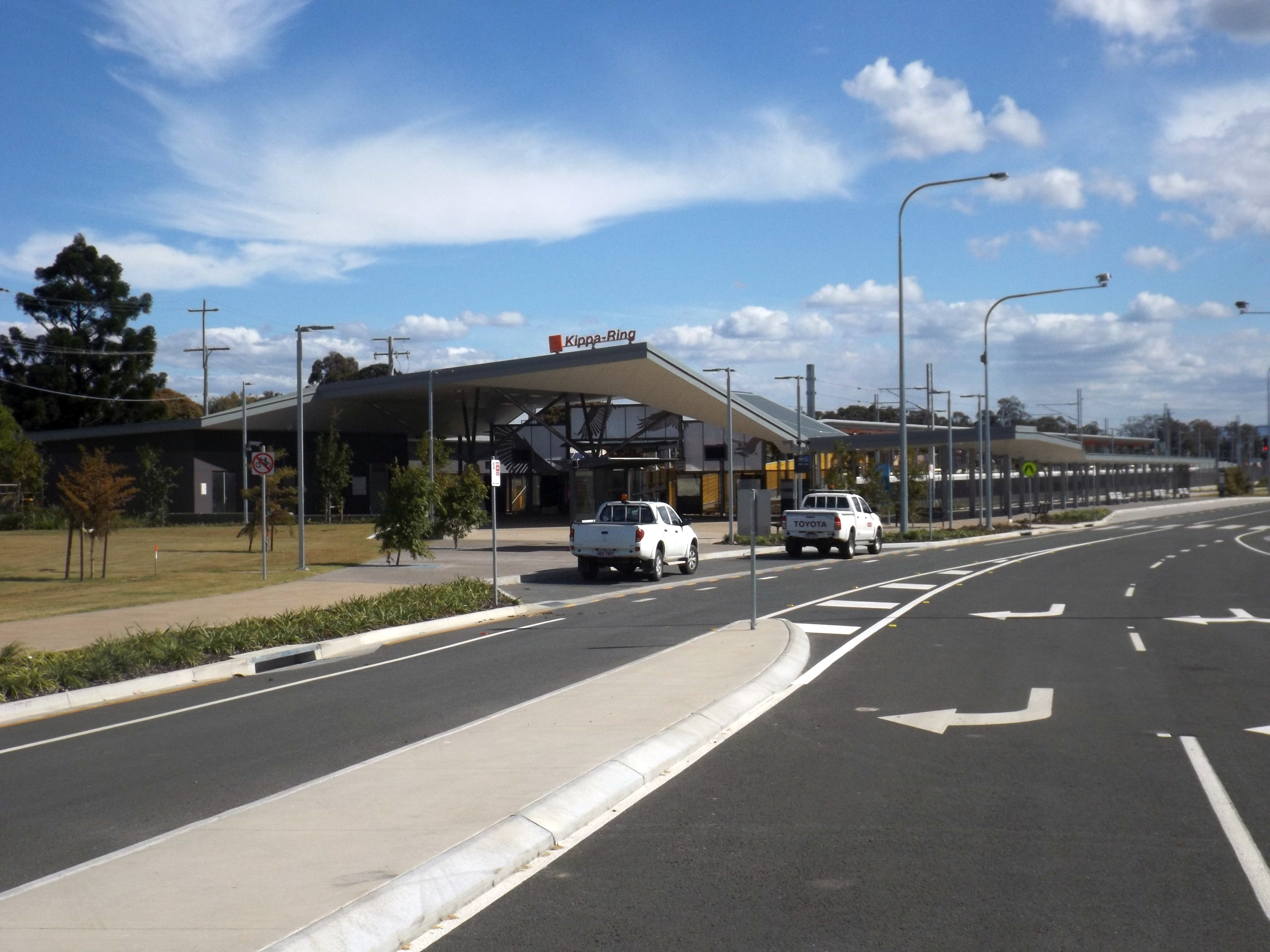
Kippa-Ring railway station, 2016

Kippa-Ring is home to two of the Redcliffe Peninsula's largest shopping centres – Peninsula Fair & Kippa-Ring Shopping Centre, both of which are side by side. Peninsula Fair houses one of the first Kmart stores in Queensland and the only multiplex cinemas on the Redcliffe peninsula plus an additional 90 specialty stores. Kippa-Ring Shopping Centre was bought in 2012 to be completely redeveloped resulting in the addition of a Target and new Woolworths alongside 40 specialty stores. Though the centres are owned by two different entities, they have been designed to accommodate easy pedestrian access between the two, including escalators and various staircases. Target closed its store in Kippa-Ring Shopping Centre in early 2021.

Peninsula Fair underwent a minor renovation in 2017 to modernise the facades, seating and a complete paintwork of the building.

The suburb contains the Peninsula Private Hospital, one of two hospitals on the Peninsula and the only private.

Kippa-Ring is home to Talobilla Park which hosts baseball club, Redcliffe Padres, rugby league club the Redcliffe Dolphins, Redcliffe PCYC softball as well as a canoe, dragon boat and rowing club. Peninsula Power football club also play at AJ Kelly Field, competing in the Football Queensland Premier League.

The suburb contains a small industrial area close to the shopping centres, which is a significant employment hub for the Peninsula. The industrial centre is one of two on the Peninsula, the other being at Clontarf.

== See also ==
Redcliffe Peninsula road network
