= Southern Cross Catholic College =

Location
- Redcliffe, Scarborough, Queensland; Australia; 27°12′15″S 153°6′34″E

Information
- Other name: SCCC
- Former name: De La Salle College
- Type: Private, co-educational, secondary, day school
- Motto: Seek the light
- Religious affiliation: Roman Catholic
- Established: 30 January 1995; 31 years ago
- Principal: Chris Campbell
- Years: 7–12
- Enrolment: 619
- Colours: Blue, red, green and white
- Website: www.sccc.qld.edu.au

The Southern Cross Catholic College (SCCC) is a co-educational Roman Catholic day school located on the Redcliffe peninsula north-east of Brisbane in Queensland, Australia. The College has four campuses - three primary campuses (Prep - Year 6) in Woody Point, Scarborough and Kippa Ring. It also has a secondary campus for Years 7-12 located in Scarborough.

== History ==
The college opened 30 January 1995 after the amalgamation of several schools on the Redcliffe Peninsula; in particular: De La Salle College - both the Junior and Secondary College (located on Scarborough Road), Frawley College (located on Scarborough Road), Soubirous College, St Bernadette's (Scarborough), Our Lady Help of Christians (Redcliffe) and Our Lady of Lourdes (Woody Point). The De La Salle campus (years 7 to 12), is located in Scarborough and three primary schools (prep to year 6) are located in Scarborough, Woody Point and Kippa-Ring, respectively.

The previous Headmasters were Paul Woodcock, Robyn Killoran Greg Myers and Brett Horton, the current principal is Chris Campbell. The school is built on the old De La Salle College site.

== Houses ==
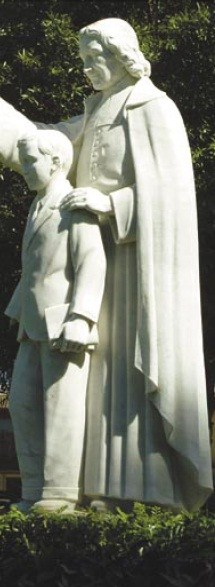
A statue that stands on the front lawn of the college.

The school has four sporting and cultural house groups to which the students are assigned. They are:

| House | Colour | Namesake | Mascot |
|---|---|---|---|
| Delany | Blue | Bishop Daniel Delany | Dolphin |
| Frawley | Green | Monsignor Bartholomew Frawley | Dragon |
| La Salle | Red | John Baptist de La Salle | Lion |
| MacKillop | White | Mary of the Cross MacKillop | Boomer |

== Land development ==
Since the amalgamation in 1995, several developments have taken place involving land and buildings that previously were occupied by the college. The former site of Soubirous College and St Bernadette's of Scarborough (including the chapel) have since been developed into residential housing.

The lower ovals of the De La Salle Campus have been used for an expansion of an aged care facility that adjoins the school.

The site previously occupied by Frawley College was incorporated as part of the College in 1994 and became campus for the senior secondary students of Southern Cross Catholic College until it was developed in 2006 as the Australian Trade College North Brisbane.

== Notable alumni ==
- Petero Civoniceva – Penrith Panthers captain
- Geoff Huegill – Australian Olympic swimmer
- Ben Jones – former NRL Player with Canberra Raiders
- Leisel Jones – Australian Olympic swimmer
- Michael Lavarch – Australian lawyer, educator and former politician
- Linda Mackenzie – Australian Olympic swimmer
- Kate McShea – Brisbane Roar FC W-League player
- Clinton O'Brien – rugby league player, represented Queensland in the 1997 State of Origin
- Sam Obst – former NRL Player with Sydney Roosters, ESL Player with Wakefield Trinity, Hull FC
- Tracey Spicer – journalist
- Ryan Phelan – television journalist, media personality and presenter
- Tarnee White – Australian Olympic swimmer
- Peta Wilson – actress, model
