= Scarborough, Queensland =

Scarborough
- Suburb
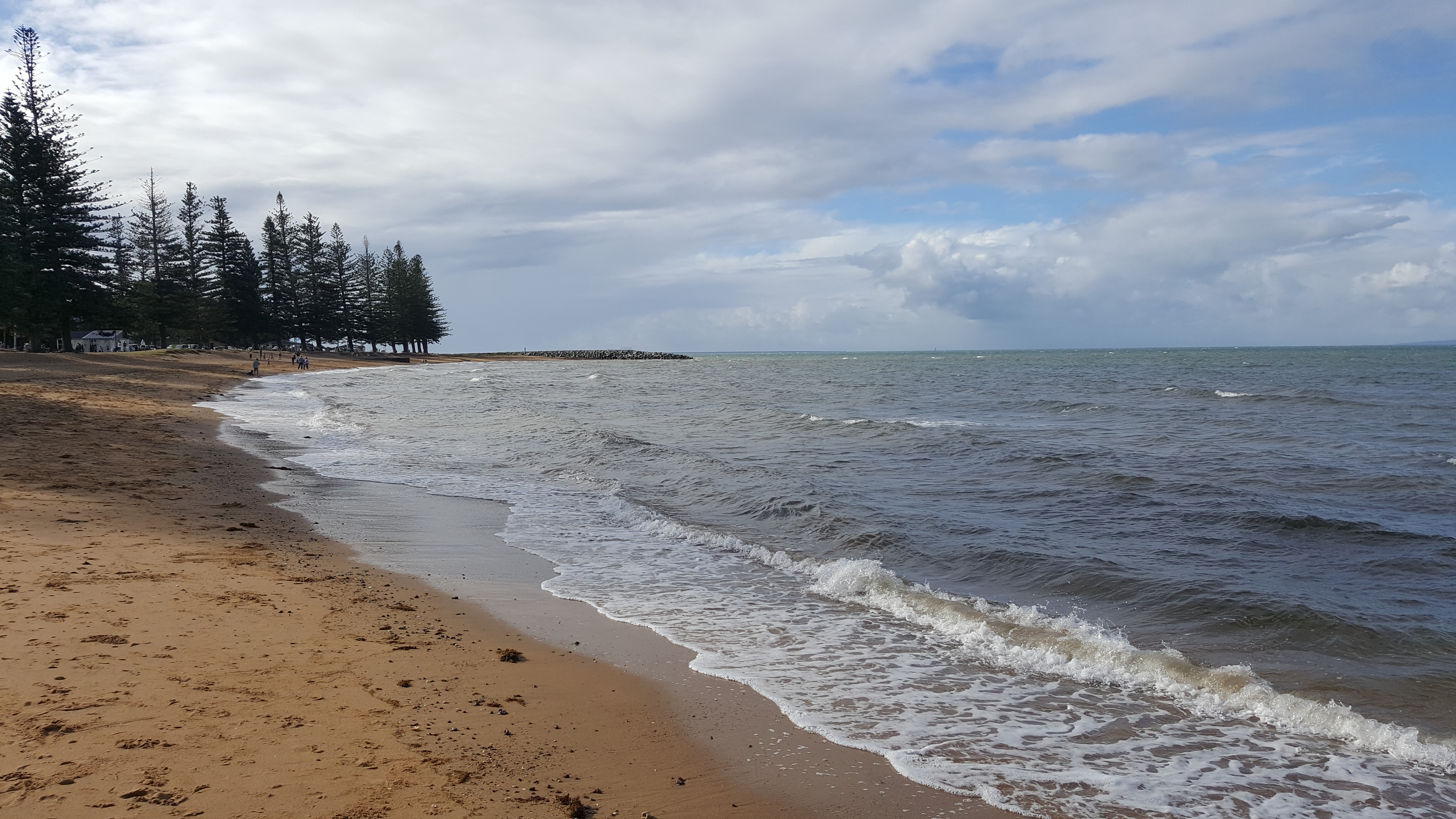
- Scarborough Beach

- Coordinates: 27.2049°S 153.1102°E
- Country: Australia
- State: Queensland
- Region: South East Queensland
- LGA(s): City of Moreton Bay
- Location: 2.7 km (1.7 mi) N of Redcliffe; 40.5 km (25.2 mi) NNE of Brisbane CBD
- Established: 1878

Government
  - State electorate(s): Redcliffe
  - Federal division(s): Petrie

Area
  - Total: 3.3 km^{2} (1.3 sq mi)

Population
  - Total(s): 9,178 (2021 census)
  - Density: 2,780/km^{2} (7,200/sq mi)
- Time zone: UTC+10:00 (AEST)
- Postcode: 4020
Suburbs around Scarborough
Deception Bay	Deception Bay	Moreton Bay
Newport	Scarborough	Moreton Bay
Newport	Redcliffe	Redcliffe

Scarborough is a coastal suburb on the Redcliffe Peninsula in the City of Moreton Bay, Queensland, Australia. In the 2021 census, Scarborough had a population of 9,178 people.

Along with its neighbouring coastal suburbs on the Redcliffe Peninsula, the suburb is a popular recreational destination within the Brisbane metropolitan area. Scarborough Beach is a safe swimming beach, with an adjacent playground.

== Geography ==
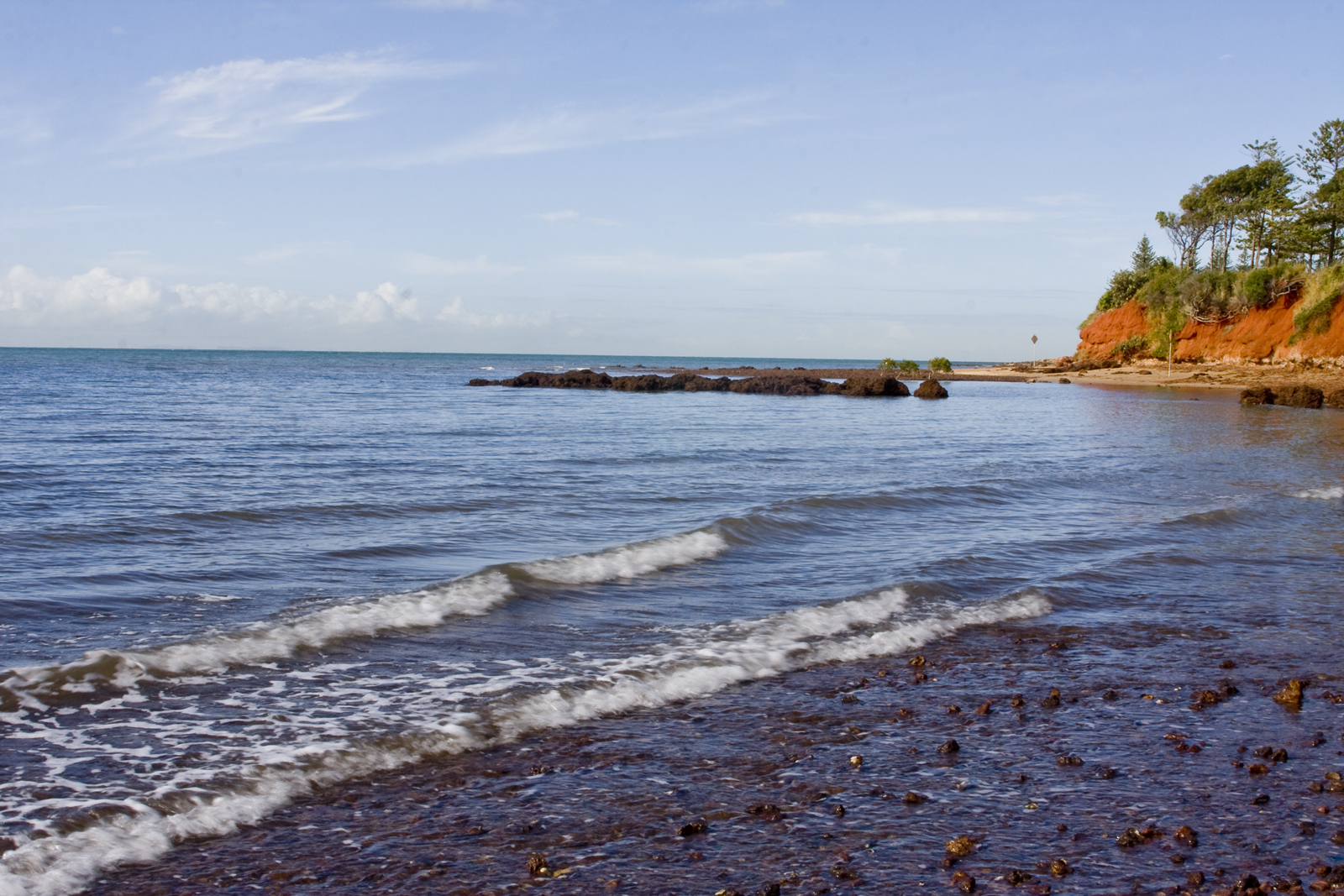
Beach and cliffs at Scarborough

Scarborough is at the northernmost suburb of the Redcliffe Peninsula. It is bounded by Deception Bay (a side bay of Moreton Bay) to the north-west and by Moreton Bay to the north and east.

Scarborough has the following coastal features (from north to south):

- Castlereagh Point (Cooturrumba Point, Reef Point) (27.1906°S 153.1125°E)
- Scarborough Point (27.1981°S 153.1164°E)
- Scarborough Beach (27.2013°S 153.1155°E)
- Drury Point (27.2043°S 153.1168°E)
- Queens Beach North (27.2097°S 153.1166°E)
- Osbourne Point (27.2123°S 153.1187°E)
- Queens Beach (27.2157°S 153.1168°E) extending south into Redcliffe

== History ==
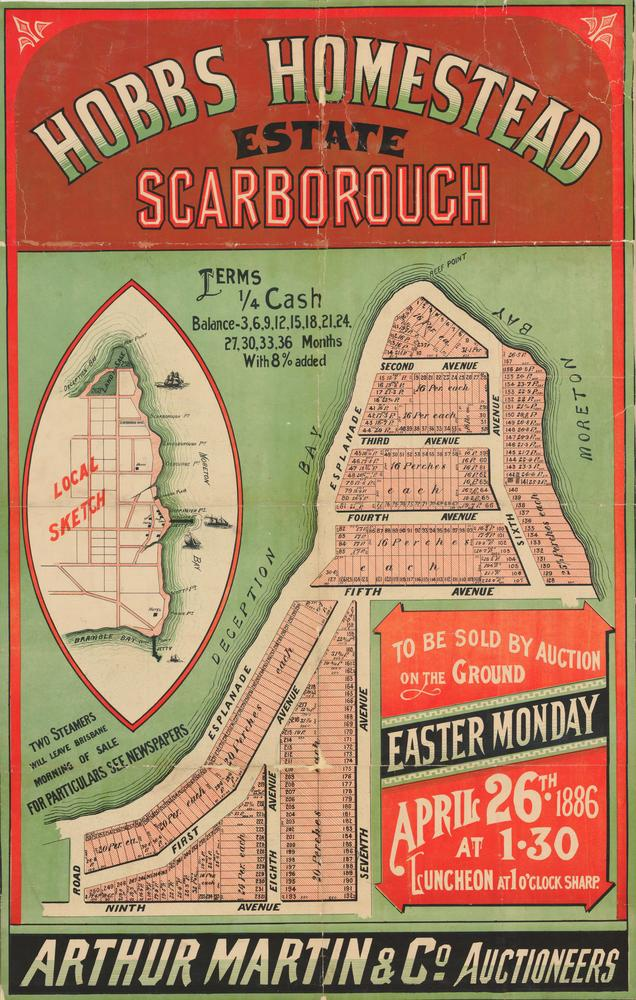
Estate map of Hobbs Homestead Estate, 1886

Land sub-division occurred when Scarborough was part of Humpy Bong, Redcliffe. In August 1878 land in the new marine township of Scarborough went to auction, postponed some months until completion of the Scarborough Hotel, in order that perspective purchasers could obtain accommodation in the township while examining the allotments. Advertisements described the beach as "unsurpassed in Australia, having splendid stretches of pure hard sand, perfectly innocent of mud or mangrove. .... a distinctive feature at this northern or Scarborough end should be recognised in the highly interesting chain of crescent-shaped bays, the waters of which wash the township cliffs, affording sheltered coves for boating purposes..."

In 1882, the proprietors of the re-surveyed town of Scarborough offered for auction, with no reserve, the remaining 250 allotments, advertising in great detail the attractions of the area. These included the "abundance of schnapper, whiting, turtle, crabs, oysters, etc awaiting capture." In 1884, land from Queen's Beach "adjoins to and forms part of the property reserved for the Hon S.W. Griffith [Samuel Griffith] for the purpose of building a seaside residence" was advertised. In 1886, land from " late marine residence of Dr Hobbs"- his house standing on three of the 295 allotments - was offered for sale. Free steamer travel, departing from Howard Smith wharves was provided on the day, Easter Monday, 16 April 1886.

In 1900–1901, allotments in the Moreton Bay Estate were advertised for sale. In the 1920s, further sales, with land north of the Redcliffe Jetty [1920], in the Walsh Estate [1927], and the Sea Breeze Estate [1929] occurred, with Silvesters, a house and land agent at Adelaide Street, Brisbane, arranging sales into the 1930s, producing an annotated map showing the location of vacant land and the asking prices. However, it was with the opening in 1935 of the Hornibrook Highway, linking the area north of Hay's Inlet to Brisbane, that lead to the rapid growth in this area.

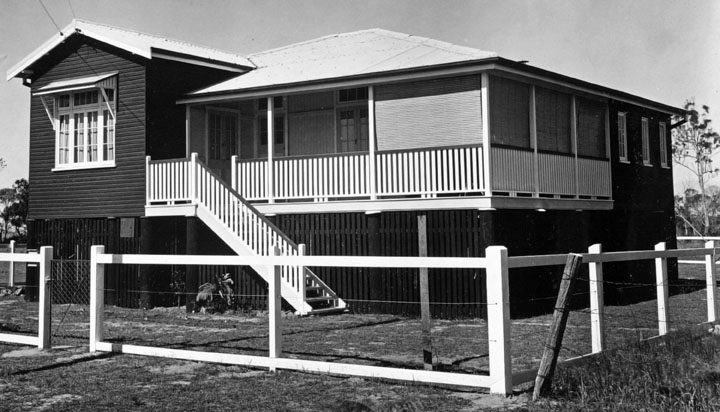
Head teacher's residence, Scarborough State School, April 1951

Scarborough State School opened on 9 March 1925 with 30 students.

On Saturday 11 December 1937, a stump-capping ceremony took place for the Scarborough Methodist Church. The new church building was relocated from Deagon where it had served as a Sunday school hall. It was officially opened on Sunday 9 January 1938 by Reverend J. A. Pratt. On 28 August 1948 the foundation stone for a new Scarborough Methodist Church was laid by Reverend Hubert Hedley Trigge, the master of Kings College at the University of Queensland, with the new church building being officially opening on 1 April 1950 by Trigge, with the former church building becoming the church hall. The church is now used by the Scarborough Samoan Seventh-Day Adventist Church.

St Bernadette's Catholic Church opened at 28 Mein Street (27.2070°S 153.11245°E) in 1946. The architect was Frances Leo Cullen. The church was sold in 1998.

St Bernadette's Catholic School opened in 1948; it was operated by the Brigidine Sisters.

Soubirous College, a Catholic secondary school, opened on 5 February 1951.

The first St Anne's Anglican Church Hall opened at 190–192 Mein Street on Sunday 1 April 1951. Funds to build the church hall were raised in part by the sales of a book "Scarborough Calling" by Cannon William Perry French Morris. The foundation stone of the current St Anne's Anglican Church was laid by Archbishop Philip Strong on Sunday 2 November 1969, with the new church officially opening on 22 November 1970. The 1951 church hall remains on the site.

Scarborough Baptist Church opened in 1952. The Baptist church was at 151 Turner Street (27.1983°S 153.1123°E), and, although still extant, it is now in private ownership.

De La Salle College, a Catholic primary and secondary school, opened on 4 February 1955.

In 1970, the senior years at Soubirous College and De Le Salle College were combined to create Frawley College, named after parish priest Monsignor Bartholomew Frawley. On 24 May 1995 the following Catholic schools combined to form Southern Cross Catholic College:

- St Bernadette's Catholic School, Scarborough
- Soubirous College, Scarborough
- De La Salle College, Scarborough
- Frawley College, Scarborough
- Our Lady Help of Christians School, Redcliffe
- Our Lady of Lourdes School, Woody Point

The suburb used to act as a gateway to Moreton Island via the Combie Trader barge, but this service ceased in July 2008 due to matters with the terminal and landing areas.

== Demographics ==
In the 2011 census, Scarborough had a population of 7,986 people.

In the 2016 census, Scarborough had a population of 8,705 people, 53.3% female and 46.7% male. The median age of the Scarborough population was 49 years, 11 years above the national median of 38. 68.7% of people living in Scarborough were born in Australia. The other top responses for country of birth were England 7.5%, New Zealand 5.4%, South Africa 1.1%, Scotland 0.9%, Philippines 0.8%. 87.8% of people spoke only English at home; the next most common languages were 0.7% German, 0.4% Spanish, 0.3% French, 0.3% Italian, 0.3% Russian.

In the 2021 census, Scarborough had a population of 9,178 people.

== Education ==
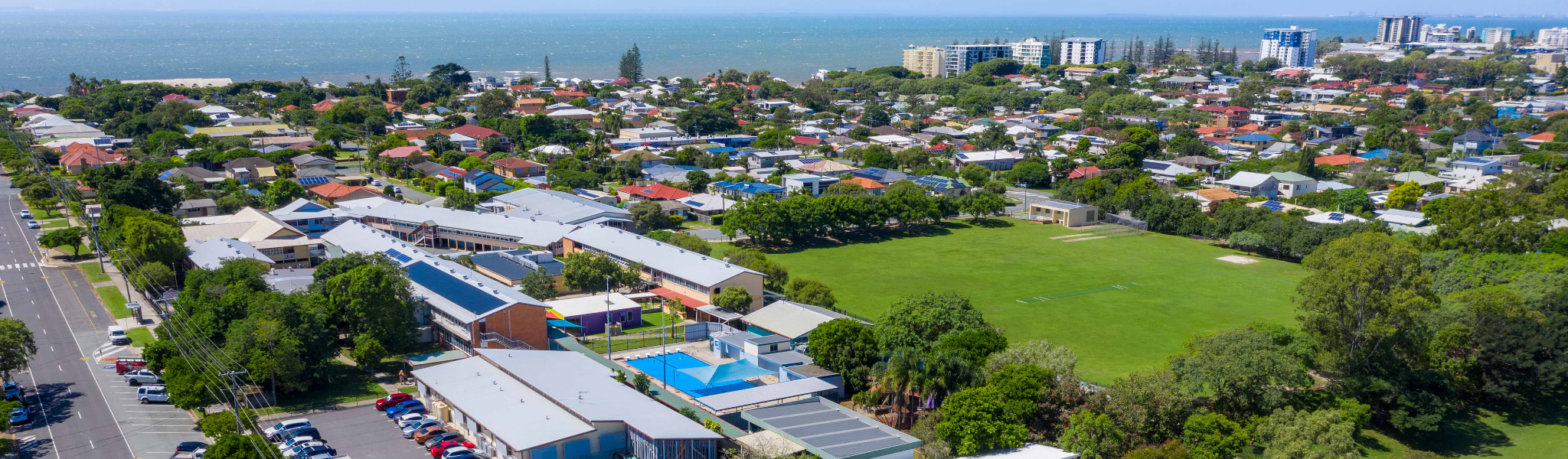
Aerial view of Scarborough State School with Moreton Bay in the distance

Scarborough State School is a government primary (Prep–6) school for boys and girls at Eversleigh Road (27.2151°S 153.1101°E). In 2018, the school had an enrolment of 751 students with 53 teachers (49 full-time equivalent) and 35 non-teaching staff (20 full-time equivalent). It includes a special education program.

Southern Cross Catholic College is a Catholic primary and secondary (Prep–12) school for boys and girls. Its main campus at 307 Scarborough Road (27.2040°S 153.1099°E) accommodates the secondary school, while three other campuses in Scarborough, Kippa-Ring and Woody Point are primary schools. In 2018, the school had an enrolment of 1,555 students with 121 teachers (106 full-time equivalent) and 90 non-teaching staff (62 full-time equivalent).

Australian Trade College North Brisbane is a private secondary (11–12) school for boys and girls at 294 Scarborough Road (27.2052°S 153.1100°E). In 2018, the school had an enrolment of 230 students with 20 teachers (15 full-time equivalent) and 11 non-teaching staff (7 full-time equivalent).

There is no government secondary school in Scarborough; the nearest government secondary school is Redcliffe State High School in neighbouring Redcliffe to the south.

== Amenities ==
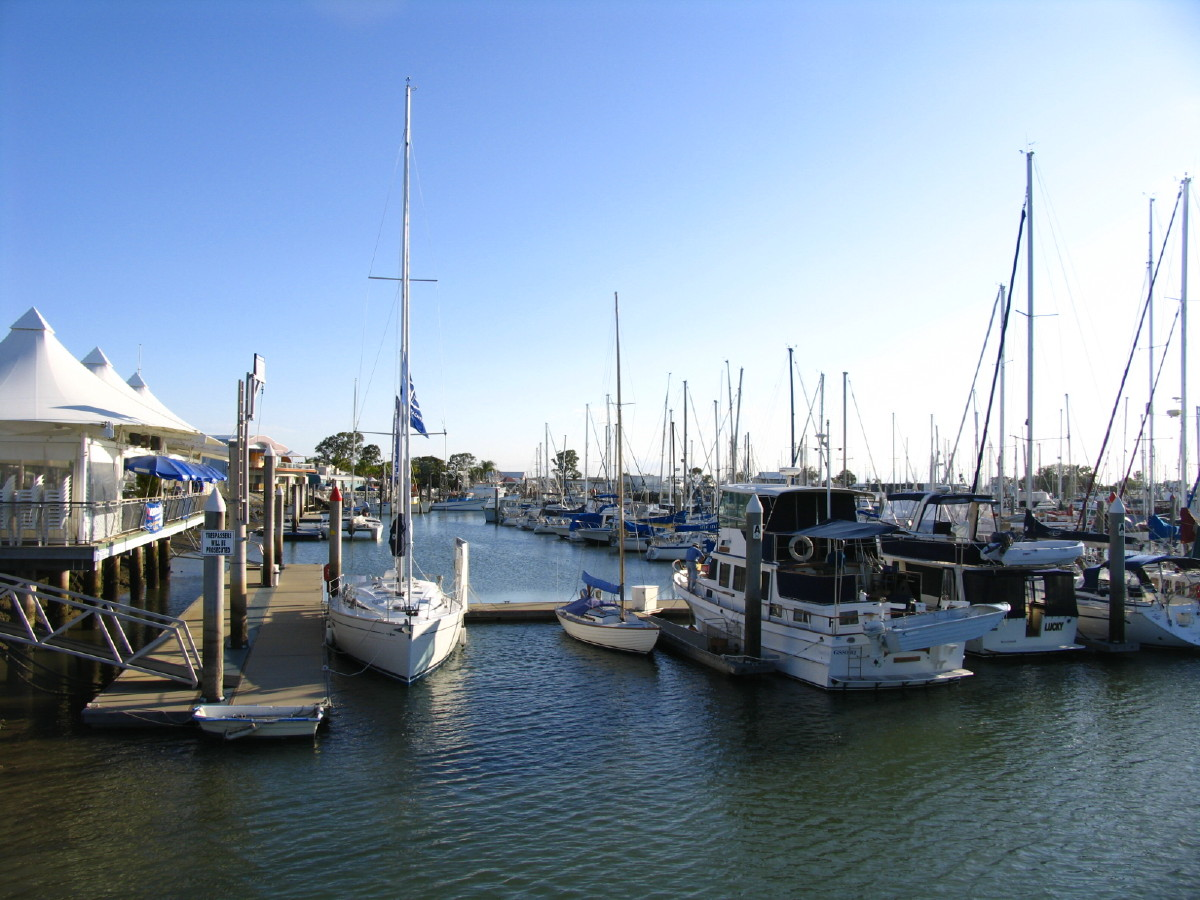
Scarborough Boat Harbour, 2007

Scarborough Post Office is at 113 Landsborough Street (27.1987°S 153.1152°E).

Churches in Scarborough include:

- St Anne's Anglican Church, south-eastern corner of Mein Street and Warde Street (27.1962°S 153.1144°E)
- Scarborough Presbyterian Church, 5 Jeays Street (27.1979°S 153.1107°E)
- Scarborough Samoan Seventh-Day Adventist Church, 143 Prince Edward Parade (27.2096°S 153.1150°E)

Scarborough Boat Harbour is a 13.7-hectare (34-acre) marina (27.1936°S 153.1072°E). Scarborough Harbour Entrance is the channel at the entry to the boat harbour (27.1927°S 153.1022°E). It is managed by the Department of Transport and Main Roads.

There are a number of boating facilities in the suburb:

- Bird O'Passage Parade boat ramp, jetty and floating walkway at the eastern end of Scarborough Boat Harbour (27.1927°S 153.1101°E), managed by the Department of Transport and Main Roads
- Thurecht Parade boat ramp, pontoon and floating walkway at the western end of Scarborough Boat Harbour (27.1941°S 153.1047°E), managed by the Department of Transport and Main Roads
- Flinders Parade boat ramp at Queens Beach North, opposite Griffith Road (27.2104°S 153.1169°E), managed by the Moreton Bay City Council

Ballycara Retirement Village is at 16b Oyster Point Road (27.2034°S 153.1013°E).

== Attractions ==
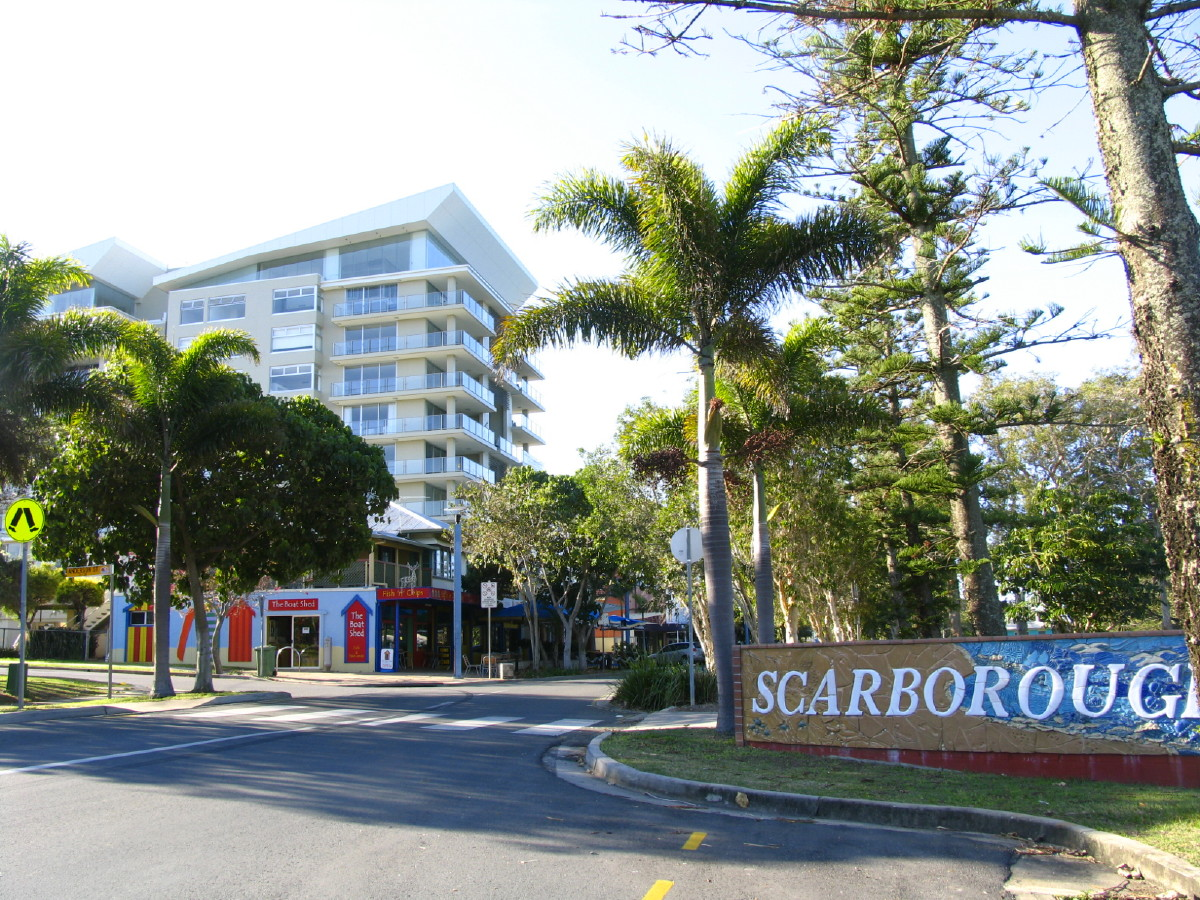
Entrance to the Scarborough Central Business District along Landsborough Parade, 2007

The main street of Scarborough, Landsborough Avenue, is a popular location for families and day visitors from Brisbane with numerous cafés. Part of the reason for its popularity is its overlooking views to Moreton Island across Moreton Bay, and quieter ambience compared to the Redcliffe central business district. The point of Scarborough is home to Scarborough Marina and Scarborough Holiday Village, while further around the bay is Newport Marina.

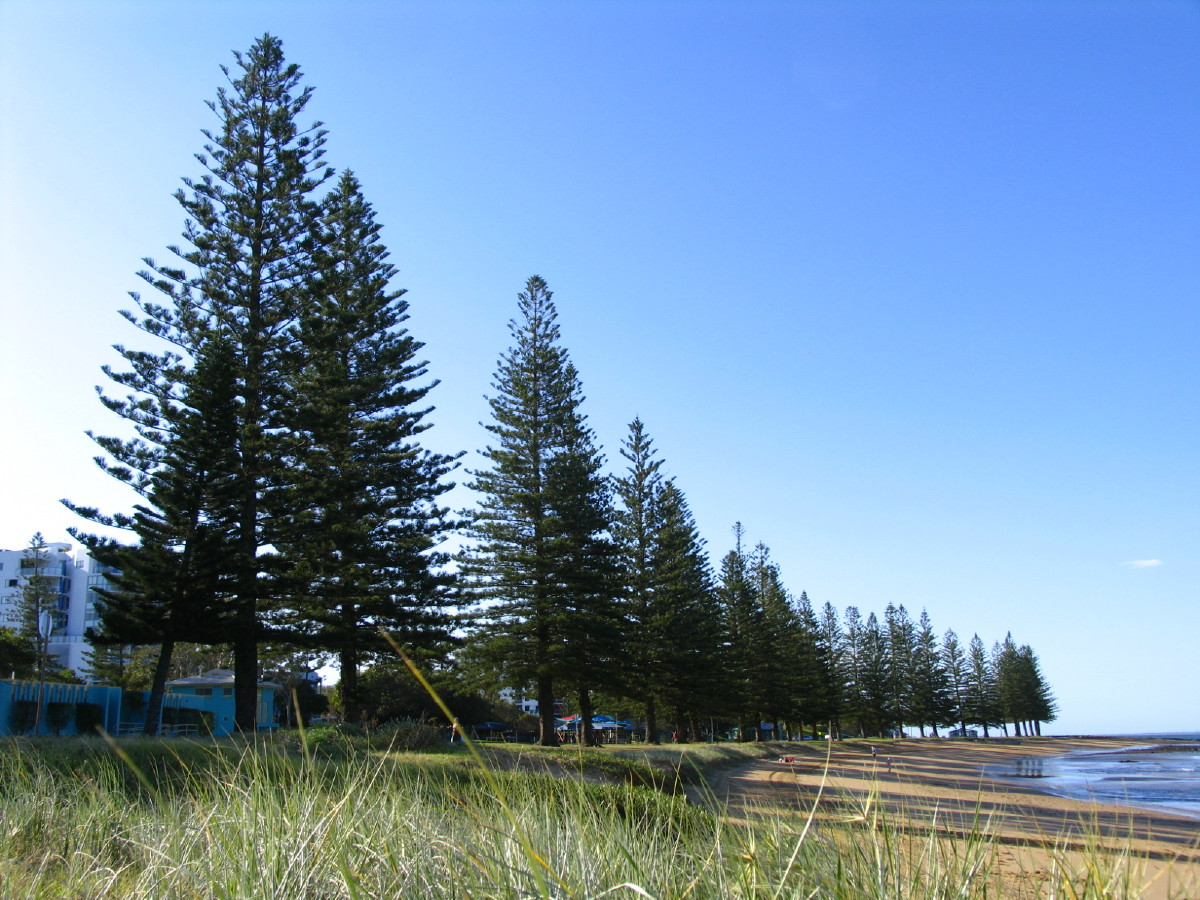
Scarborough Beach, 2007

The suburb is known for its thriving seafood industry centred upon the Scarborough Boat Harbour. Scarborough Beach is one of a number of sandy beaches along its eastern coastline, with its Scarborough Beach Park awarded the "Queensland's Friendliest Beach" in 2003 and "Australia's Friendliest Beach" in 2004. The beach is safe for swimming and kayaking, and popular with fishers.

Turner Reef is a 20.0-hectare (49-acre) artificial reef in the Moreton Bay Marine Park (27.1963°S 153.1293°E). It was named after Bill Turner, who lobbied for over 20 years to establish an artificial reef off Scarborough. It is 1 nautical mile (1.9 km; 1.2 mi) east of the coast of Scarborough at a depth of approximately 6 metres (20 ft).

== In popular culture ==
Parts of the movie Scooby-Doo were filmed at Queens Beach in Scarborough; the majority of the movie was filmed at Tangalooma Resort at Moreton Island.

== See also ==
Redcliffe Peninsula road network
