= Woody Point, Queensland =

Woody Point
- Suburb
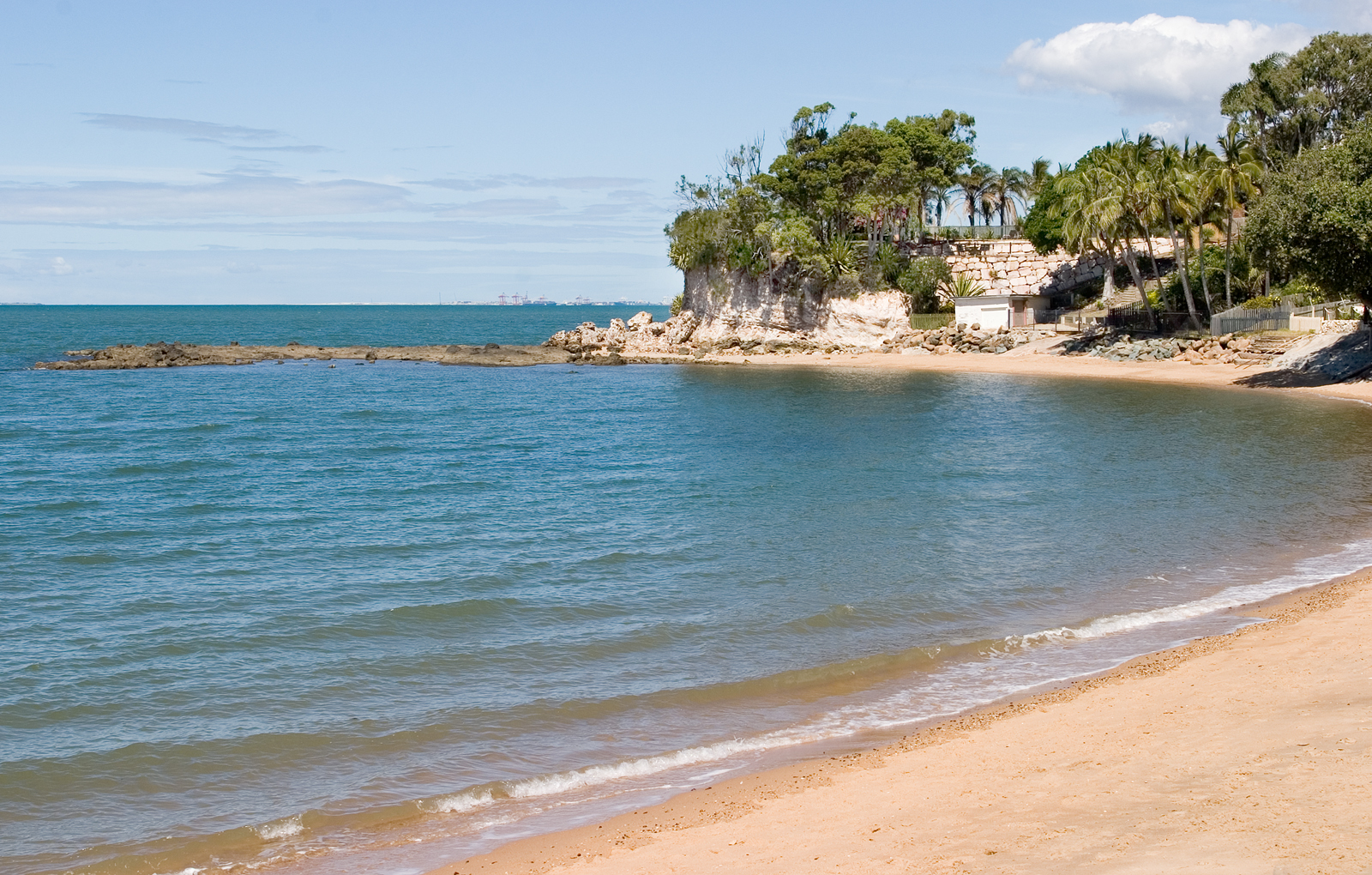
- Scotts Point Beach at Woody Point

- Interactive map of Woody Point
- Coordinates: 27.2544°S 153.1016°E
- Country: Australia
- State: Queensland
- City: Redcliffe
- LGA: City of Moreton Bay
- Location: 3.9 km (2.4 mi) S of Redcliffe; 35.2 km (21.9 mi) NNE of Brisbane CBD
- Established: 1971

Government
  - State electorate: Redcliffe
  - Federal division: Petrie

Area
  - Total: 1.7 km^{2} (0.66 sq mi)

Population
  - Total: 4,548 (2021 census)
  - Density: 2,680/km^{2} (6,930/sq mi)
- Time zone: UTC+10:00 (AEST)
- Postcode: 4019
Suburbs around Woody Point
Margate	Margate	Moreton Bay
Clontarf	Woody Point	Moreton Bay
Bramble Bay	Bramble Bay	Moreton Bay

Woody Point is a coastal suburb of Redcliffe in the City of Moreton Bay, Queensland, Australia. In the 2021 census, Woody Point had a population of 4,548 people.

== Geography ==
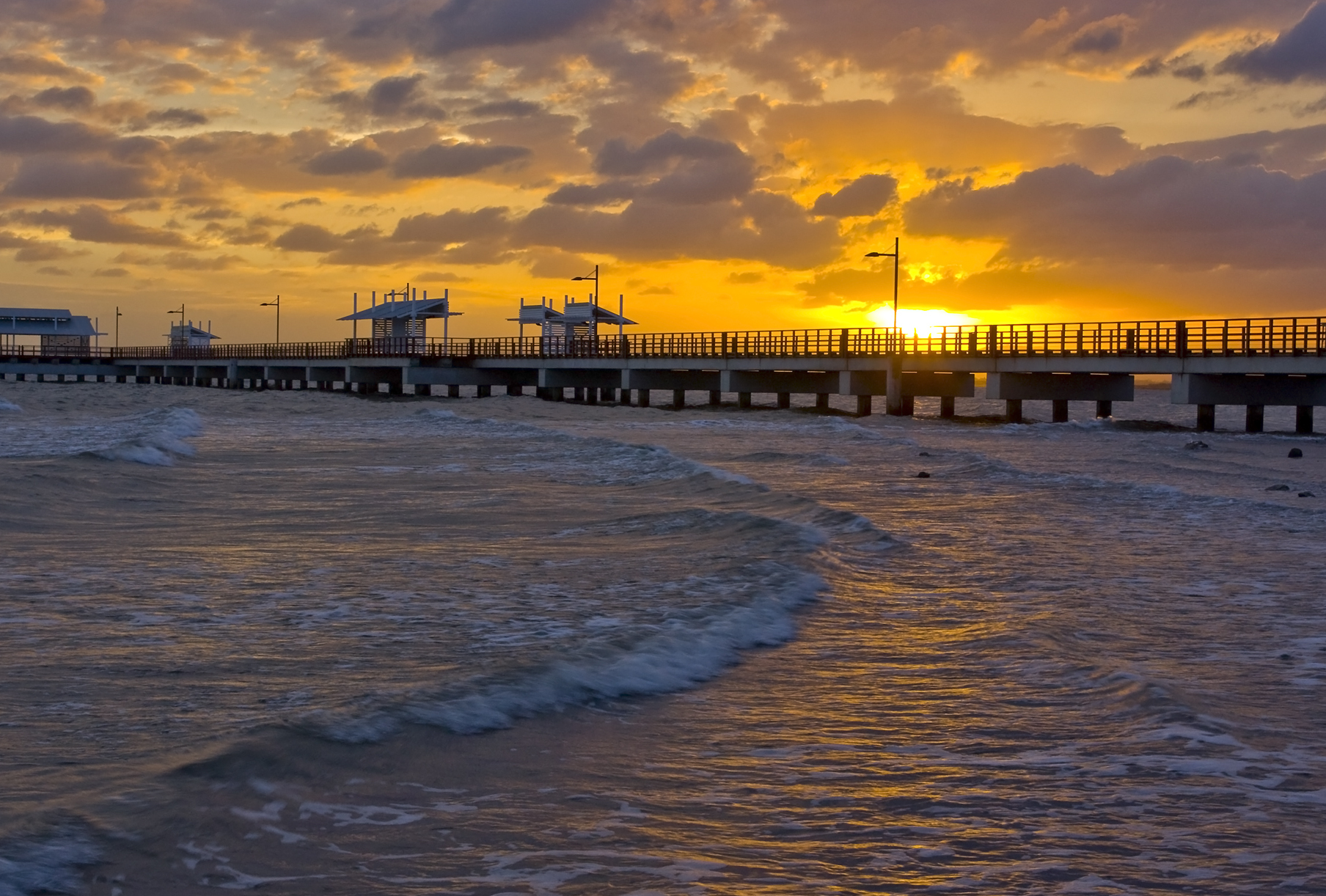
Woody Point jetty and beach

Woody Point is at the south-east of the Redcliffe Peninsula, approximately 35.2 kilometres (21.9 mi) by road north-northeast of Brisbane, the state capital of Queensland, Australia.

The suburb is bounded by Moreton Bay to the east, Bramble Bay to the south, roughly by unnamed drain to the west and roughly by King Street to the north.

There are three headlands along the eastern coast of the suburb. At the southern tip is Woody Point (27.2630°S 153.1038°E), also known as Ningeryoun, first marked on a 1840s survey map by James Charles Burnett. Further north are:

- Picnic Point (27.2614°S 153.1077°E)
- Scotts Point (27.2547°S 153.1102°E), which was probably named after surgeon Peter Walter Scott who was the storekeeper in Moreton Bay penal settlement between 1824 and 1926.

== History ==
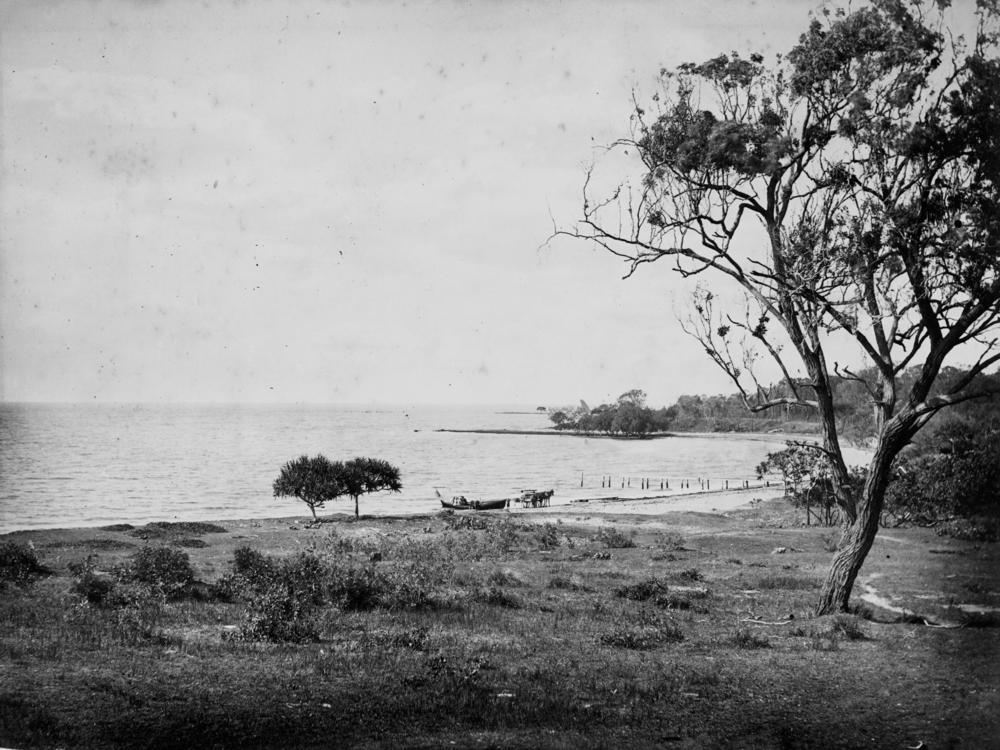
Woody Point shoreline, ca. 1876

In 1799, Matthew Flinders landed on the peninsula and named the location Red Cliff Point after the colours of the cliffs. In 1823 the peninsula was selected as the site of Queensland's first (and only) penal colony (Moreton Bay penal settlement). After arriving in 1824 to establish the colony, problems with mosquitoes and resistance from the Gubbi Gubbi (Kabi Kabi) and the people (Ningi Ningi, Ninghi Ninghi), part of the Undambi people who were indigenous to the land, caused the colony to relocate further up the Brisbane River in 1825, founding the city of Brisbane.

Woody Point Jetty was built in 1888. It was reconstructed during 2008 at a cost of $9.6 million.

A one-off 'high speed reliability trial' motor race was held in 1936, with a 4.2km (2.65 mile) circuit using the following streets in a clockwise direction: Oxley St-Duffield Rd-Ernest St-Albert St-Margate Pde-Whytecliffe Pde-Gayundah Esplanade-Lilla St-Alfred St. Competitors had to average fixed speeds over the 27 laps.

Our Lady of Lourdes School opened in 1969 and closed in 1995.

Woody Point Special School opened on 21 August 1978. The school supported children from Early Childhood to Year 12 initially, but, following a community consultation in 2017, it was decided that the schools should support children from Early Childhood to Year 6, but that children with special needs from Years 7 to 12 would attend Redcliffe Special School. This transition commenced in 2018 and took two years to complete.

Southern Cross Catholic College (Woody Point Primary) opened in 2002, being formed by the amalgamation of three Catholic primary schools of the Peninsula, Soubirous College and De La Salle College.

In 1958, HMQS Gayundah was run aground at Woody Point to create a breakwater.

The foundation stone of St Mark's Anglican Church was laid at 46 Kate Street (corner of Annie Street, 27.2577°S 153.1070°E) on Sunday 26 April 1953 by Archbishop Reginald Halse. The church was dedicated on 7 April 1957 by Archbishop Halse. It was consecrated on 28 April 1968 by Archbishop Philip Strong. In the 1990s it was decided to combine the congregations of St Mark's and St Barnabas in Clontarf into a new St Peter the Fisherman's Anglican Church at Clontarf. This led to the closure of St Mark's on 24 April 1993 which was approved by Assistant Bishop George Browning. St Peter the Fisherman's was dedicated in 1993. As at July 2020, the St Mark's site has been converted into a multi-unit dwelling but the foundation stone is still visible on the street corner.

== Demographics ==
In the 2011 census, Woody Point had a population of 4,089 people, 51.5% female and 48.5% male. The median age of the Woody Point population was 46 years, 9 years above the national median of 37. 71.5% of people living in Woody Point were born in Australia. The other top responses for country of birth were England 6.3%, New Zealand 6.3%, Scotland 1.2%, South Africa 0.9%, Canada 0.6%. 89.3% of people spoke only English at home; the next most common languages were 0.6% Spanish, 0.4% Russian, 0.4% German, 0.4% French, 0.3% Dutch.

In the 2016 census, Woody Point had a population of 4,418 people.

In the 2021 census, Woody Point had a population of 4,548 people.

== Heritage listings ==
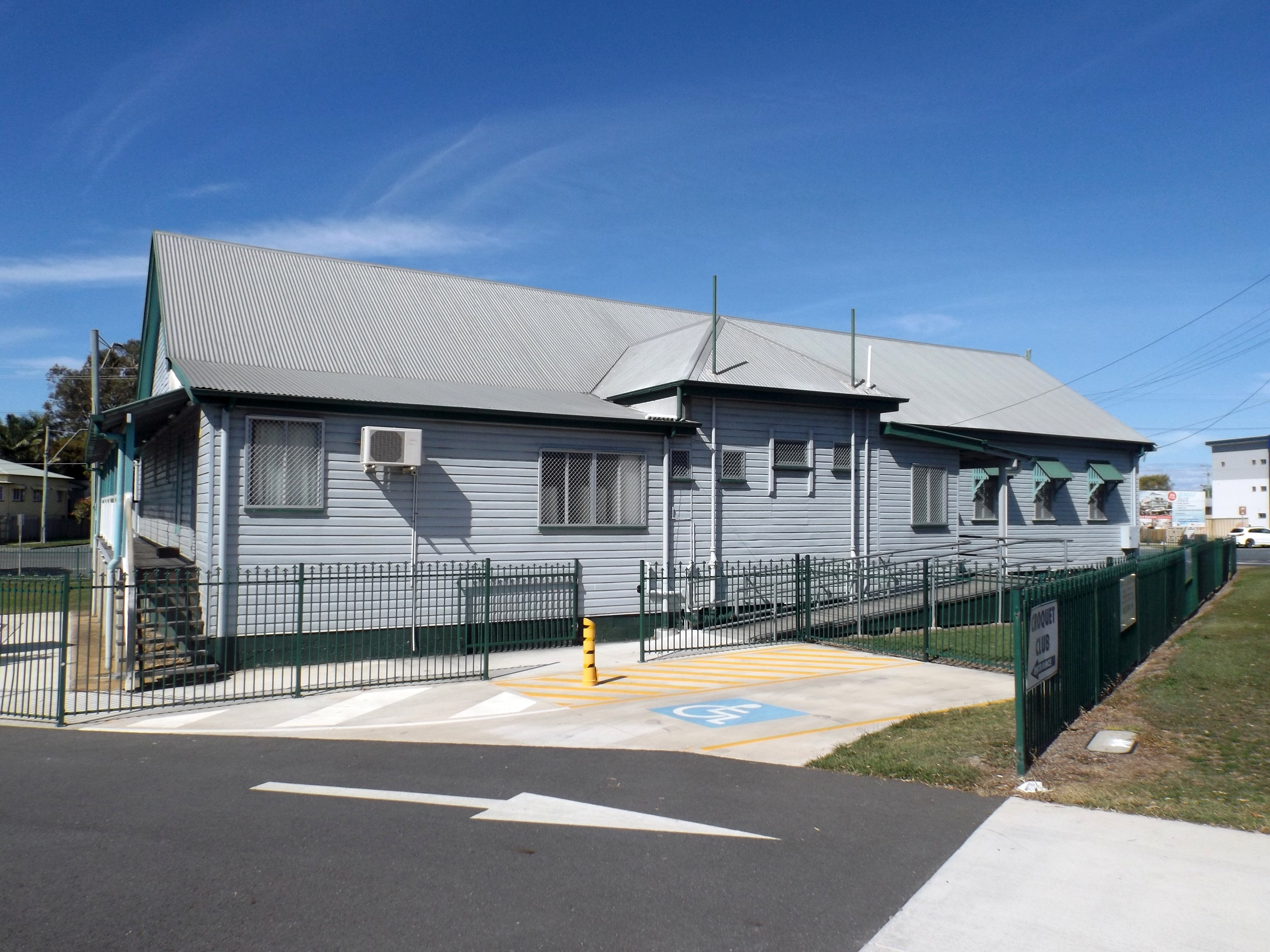
Woody Point Memorial Hall, 2016

Heritage-listed sites at Woody Point including Woody Point Memorial Hall along the Hornibrook Esplanade (27.26°S 153.1036°E.

== Education ==
Founded in 1995, Southern Cross Catholic College is a private primary to Year 12 Catholic school (headquartered at Scarborough). The college has 4 campuses: Kippa-Ring Primary Campus, Scarborough Primary Campus, Scarborough Secondary Campus and Woody Point Secondary Campus. The school's current principal is Mr Chris Campbell (2022). The Woody Point campus is at 84 Collins Street (27.2504°S 153.0983°E).

Woody Point Special School is a special primary school (Early Childhood to Year 6) for boys and girls at 85 Georgina Street (27.2557°S 153.1005°E). In 2018, the school had an enrolment of 86 students with 33 teachers (25 full-time equivalent) and 48 non-teaching staff (33 full-time equivalent). It includes an early childhood special education program.

The nearest government mainstream primary schools are Humpybong State School in neighbouring Margate to the north and Clontarf Beach State School in neighbouring Clontarf to the west. The nearest government secondary school is Clontarf Beach State High School at Clontarf.

== Amenities ==
The Clontarf branch of the Queensland Country Women's Association meets at the corner of Victoria Avenue and Georgina Street (27.2554°S 153.0973°E).

Bramble Bay Bowls Club is on the corner of Hornibrook Esplanade and Victoria Avenue (27.2561°S 153.0974°E).

Eildon Croquet Club is on the corner of the Hornibrook Esplanade and Oxley Avenue (27.2594°S 153.1033°E).

== Attractions ==
Woody Point Jetty is a 240-metre (790 ft) jetty at the point Woody Point (27.2650°S 153.1024°E) with informative displays, seating and facilities for fishing.

The remains of the HMQS Gayundah (27.2620°S 153.1072°E) can be seen at Picnic Point.

== See also ==
- Redcliffe Peninsula road network
