= Clontarf Beach State High School =

Location
- Redcliffe, Queensland; Australia; 27.2486°S 153.0856°E

Information
- Type: Public, co-educational, secondary, day school
- Motto: Pride, Passion, Pathways
- Established: 1964
- Principal: Jo House
- Enrolment: 909 (2023)
- Campus: Clontarf
- Colours: Yellow, green and blue
- Website: clontarfbeachshs.eq.edu.au

Clontarf Beach State High School (CBSHS) is a public co-educational secondary school located in the Moreton Bay suburb of Clontarf, Queensland, Australia. It is administered by the Queensland Department of Education, with an enrolment of 909 students and a teaching staff of 88, as of 2023. The school serves students from Year 7 to Year 12.

== History ==
The school opened on 28 January 1964, which the arrival of, signified that the area was now a well-developed urban area.

== Demographics ==
In December 2008, the enrolment number of the school was 1,240 students.

In 2023, the school had a student enrolment of 909 with 88 teachers (83.1 full-time equivalent) and 57 non-teaching staff (37.4 full-time equivalent). Female enrolments consisted of 442 students and Male enrolments consisted of 467 students; Indigenous enrolments accounted for a total of 11% and 12% of students had a language background other than English.

== Notable alumni ==
- William McInnes – Actor and author
- Don Meij – Businessman
- Craig Moore – Former Socceroos captain
- Terry Rogers – Politician
- Brent Tate – Rugby league footballer
- Tina Thomsen – Actress
- Cortnee Vine – Matildas player

== See also ==
- Education in Queensland
- List of schools in Greater Brisbane
