= Westfield North Lakes =

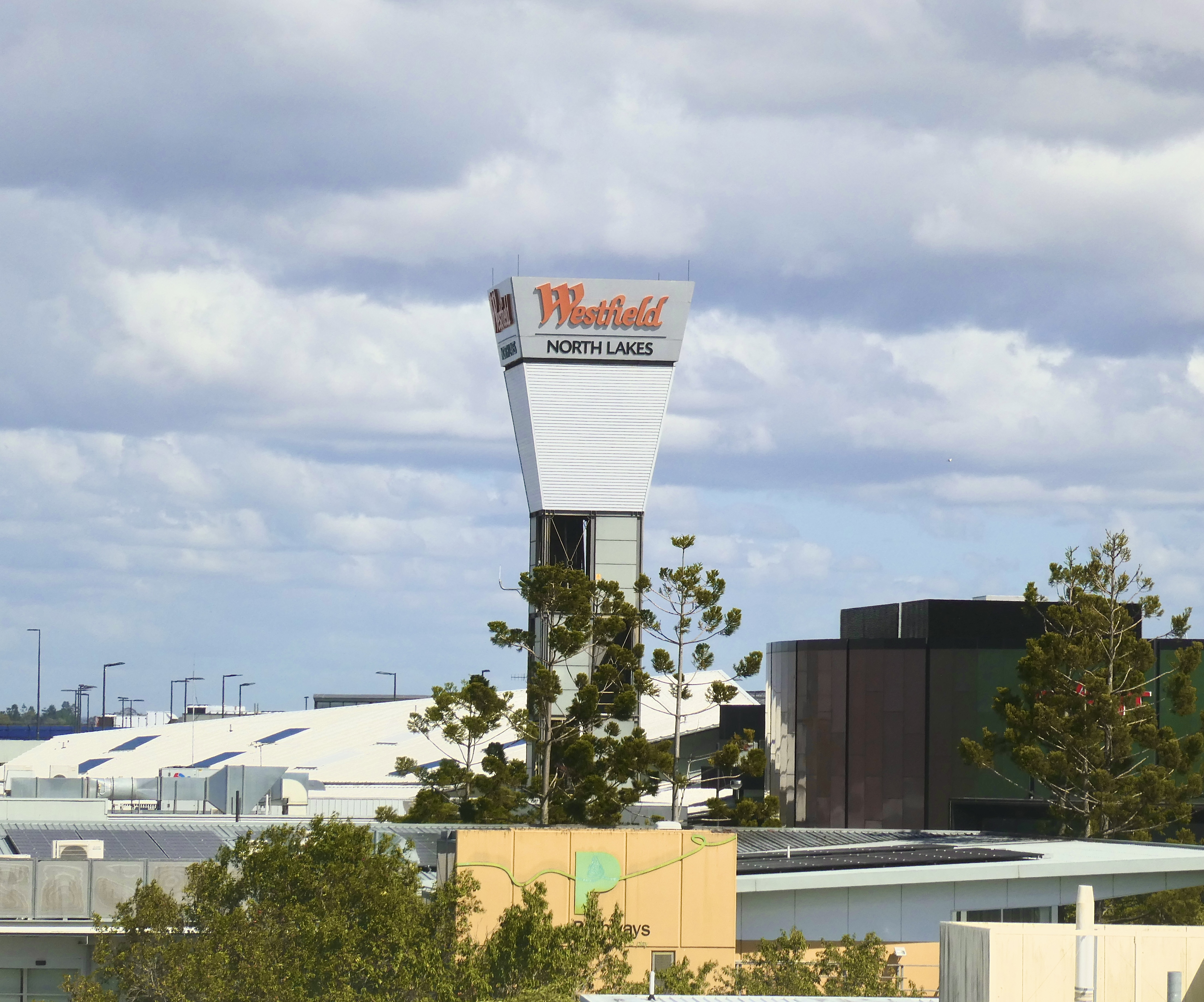
- The Westfield North Lakes tower along with the former Pathways Learning Centre in the foreground.
- Location: North Lakes, Brisbane Australia
- Coordinates: 27°14′31″S 153°00′59″E
- Opened: Stage 1: 7 August 2003; Stage 2: October 2007; Stage 3: 17 November 2016
- Developer: Westfield Group
- Manager: Scentre Group
- Owner: Dexus (50%); Scentre Group (50%)
- Num. of stores: 274 (Stage 3)
- Num. of anchor tenants: Ikea, Myer, Coles, Kmart, Target, Big W, Woolworths, Aldi, Rebel Sport, Event Cinemas.
- Floor area: 25,609 m^{2} (275,650 sq ft) Stage 1(approx)
- Floors: 2
- Parking: 4,883
- Public transit: North Lakes bus station
- Website: www.westfield.com.au/northlakes

Westfield North Lakes is a shopping centre in North Lakes, Brisbane, Australia.

== History ==
=== Planning ===
In 1999, the Pine Rivers Shire Council permitted developers Lend Lease and Lensworth to start developing North Lakes. On 8 March 2002, the 30.28-hectare Town Centre Core, Sector One bounded by North Lakes Drive, Anzac Avenue, and the Bruce Highway was selected for use as a mixed-use, retail, commercial and entertainment development. To support the growth of the new suburb, two major developments were announced in February 2002. They took place in the newly designated Town Centre Core and Frame Precinct, managed under the Mango Hill Infrastructure Development Control Plan. The two projects included the Foundation Building and Recreation and leisure complex, and Westfield North Lakes.

=== Construction ===
In August 2002, construction commenced of the first stage of Westfield North Lakes within the allocated 25-hectare site. The first stage had cost $67 million, comprising 25,000 square metres of retail space. The first anchor tenants were Coles and Target, while 60 specialty retailers were included in the first stage. The shopping centre also featured an outdoor restaurant and lifestyle precinct catering for the fast-growing suburb.

=== Opening ===
The centre opened in on 7 August 2003 and initially included around 80 stores including Target and Coles. In early 2007, construction began on a major extension that was set to bring the total number of stores in the centre to over 200. The extension was opened to the public in October of the same year, including Big W and Woolworths stores and a food court which replaced the old one that was demolished due to the expansion.

In May 2008, the centre's 2-level Myer store was opened, which replaced the Myer store in Strathpine Centre that closed in 2007. Ikea opened its second Queensland store at Westfield North Lakes in November 2016. Stage 3 also has 60 additional stores, including Kmart, Rebel Sport, JB Hi-Fi and Cotton On.

In 2004, the Deutsche Diversified Trust acquired a 50% shareholding.

== Public transport ==
North Lakes bus station is a 350 m (380 yd) or 5 minute walk from the shopping centre with routes to the Redcliffe Peninsula, Chermside, Strathpine, Petrie, Narangba, Kallangur, Griffin, Murrumba Downs, Mango Hill and North Lakes.

Mango Hill railway station is the closest train station to Westfield North Lakes at around a 1.4 km (0.87 mi) or 21 minute walk. Alternatively, bus route 687 service Mango Hill railway station from the North Lakes bus station.

== See also ==
- Westfield Chermside
- Tulip Town
