= North Lakes bus station =

Bus station in Moreton Bay, Queensland

North Lakes
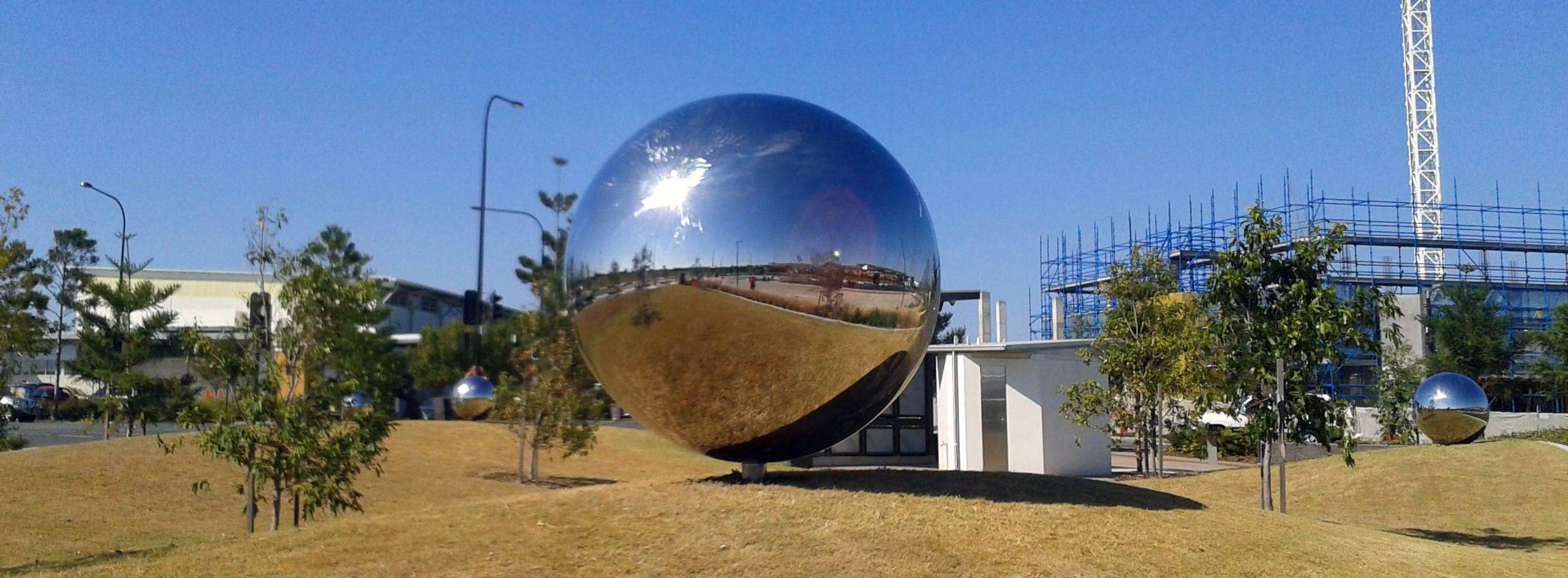
- Sculpture of four metallic spheres by Leah King-Smith at North Lakes Bus Station

General information
- Location: Endeavour Boulevard, North Lakes
- Coordinates: 27°14′16.7″S 153°01′03.5″E
- Owner: Department of Transport & Main Roads
- Platforms: 2
- Bus routes: 11
- Bus stands: 2

Construction
- Accessible: Yes

Other information
- Station code: 319806 (platform 1); 319805 (platform 2)
- Fare zone: Zone 3
- Website: Translink

History
- Opened: 29 January 2013; 13 years ago
Location

North Lakes is a bus station operated by Translink. It opened in 2013 and serves the Moreton Bay suburb of North Lakes. It is a ground level station, featuring one island platform with two faces.

It is served by 11 routes operated by Hornibrook Bus Lines, Thompsons Bus Service and Kangaroo Bus Lines. Before opening in 2013, buses previously departed from the nearby Westfield North Lakes. It is a short walk from Westfield North Lakes.

== Bus routes ==
The following bus routes services North Lakes bus station:

Platform	Route number	Destination	Locations/roads serving
1	676	Murrumba Downs	Murrumba Downs railway station, Griffin
1	679	Murrumba Downs	Kallangur railway station, Castle Hill estate
1	684	Kallangur railway station	Duffield Road, Kallangur Fair
1	685	Kallangur railway station	Old Gympie Road, School Road
2	668	Narangba railway station	Endeavour Boulevard, Potassium Street, Mackie Road
2	680 (inbound)	Chermside	Kallangur, Petrie railway station, Lawnton, Strathpine, Bald Hills, Carseldine, Aspley
2	680 (outbound)	Redcliffe	Rothwell, Kippa-Ring
2	681	Mango Hill (loop)	Mango Hill Village, Capestone, Mango Hill railway station
2	682	Mango Hill (loop)	Mango Hill railway station, Capestone, Mango Hill Village
2	687	Mango Hill railway station	Endeavour Boulevard, Bounty Boulevard, Discovery Drive
2	688	North Lakes (loop)	Endeavour Boulevard, Aurora Boulevard, Bounty Boulevard, Discovery Drive
2	689	North Lakes (loop)	Discovery Drive, Bounty Boulevard, Aurora Boulevard, Endeavour Boulevard
