= Mango Hill East railway station =

Railway station in Queensland, Australia

Mango Hill East
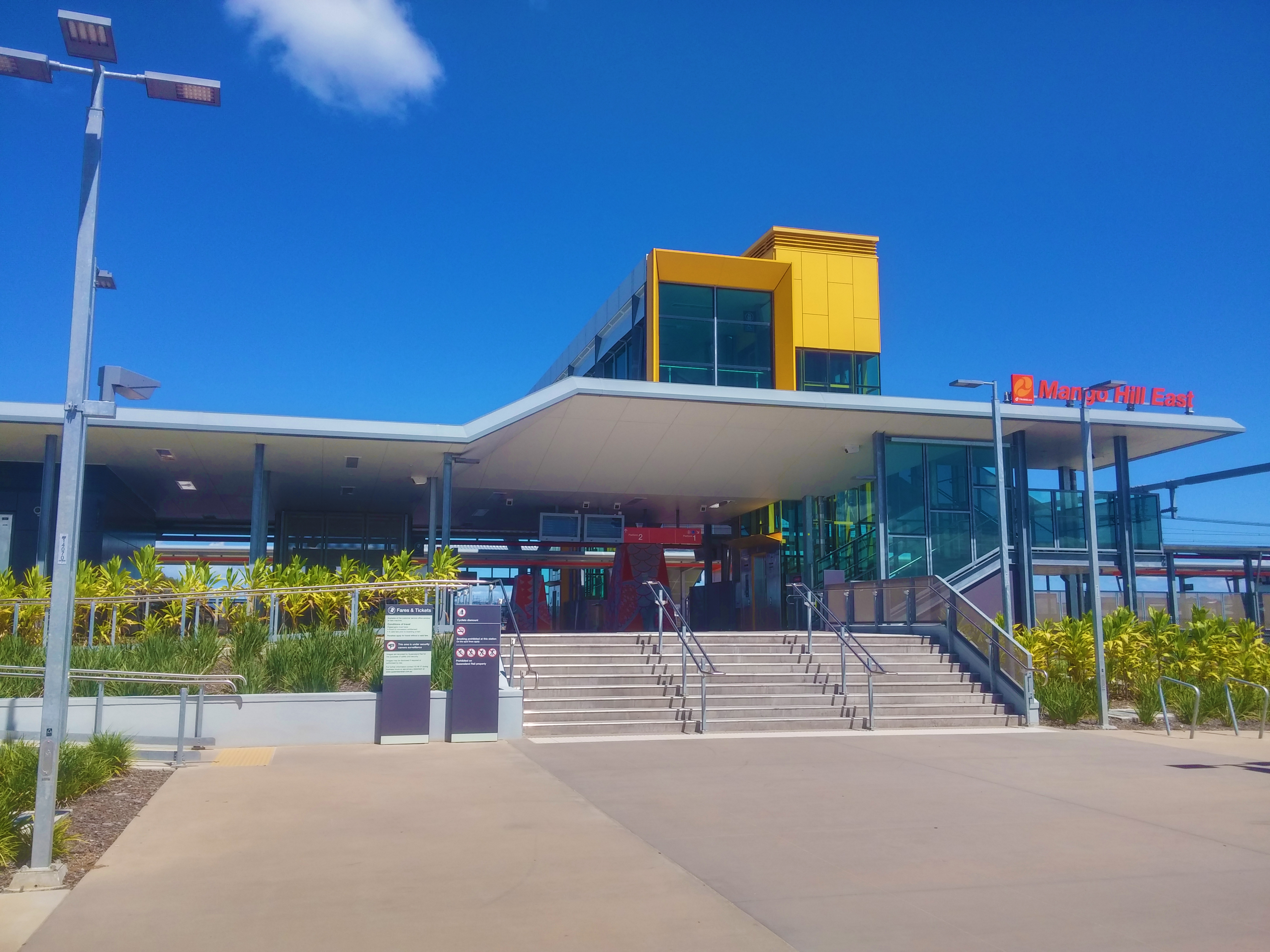
- Station front in January 2017

General information
- Location: Glendalough Court, Mango Hill; Australia
- Coordinates: 27.23352°S 153.03590°E
- Owner: Queensland Rail
- Operator: Queensland Rail
- Line: Redcliffe Peninsula
- Distance: 34.89 kilometres from Central
- Platforms: 2 side
- Tracks: 2

Construction
- Structure type: Ground
- Parking: 350 spaces
- Cycle facilities: Yes
- Accessible: Yes

Other information
- Station code: 600637 (platform 1); 600638 (platform 2)
- Fare zone: Zone 3

History
- Opened: 4 October 2016; 9 years ago

Services
Preceding station	Queensland Rail	Following station
Mango Hill towards Springfield Central via Roma Street	Redcliffe Peninsula line	Rothwell towards Kippa-Ring
Location

Mango Hill East is a railway station operated by Queensland Rail on the Redcliffe Peninsula line. It opened in 2016 and serves the Moreton Bay suburb of Mango Hill. It is a ground level station, featuring two side platforms.

Until December 2012, it was going to be named Kinsellas Road until renamed to conform with Translink's policy of naming stations after where they are located.

== Services ==
Mango Hill East is served by trains operating from Kippa-Ring to Roma Street and Springfield Central. Some afternoon weekday services continue to Ipswich.

== Services by platform ==
Mango Hill East platform arrangement
Platform	Line	Destinations	Notes
1	Redcliffe Peninsula	Roma Street, Springfield Central & Ipswich	
2	Redcliffe Peninsula	Kippa-Ring	

== Transport links ==
Hornibrook Bus Lines operates one bus route near Mango Hill East Station on Anzac Avenue via footpath access on Capestone Boulevard.

- 680: Redcliffe to Chermside bus station
