= Tulip Town =

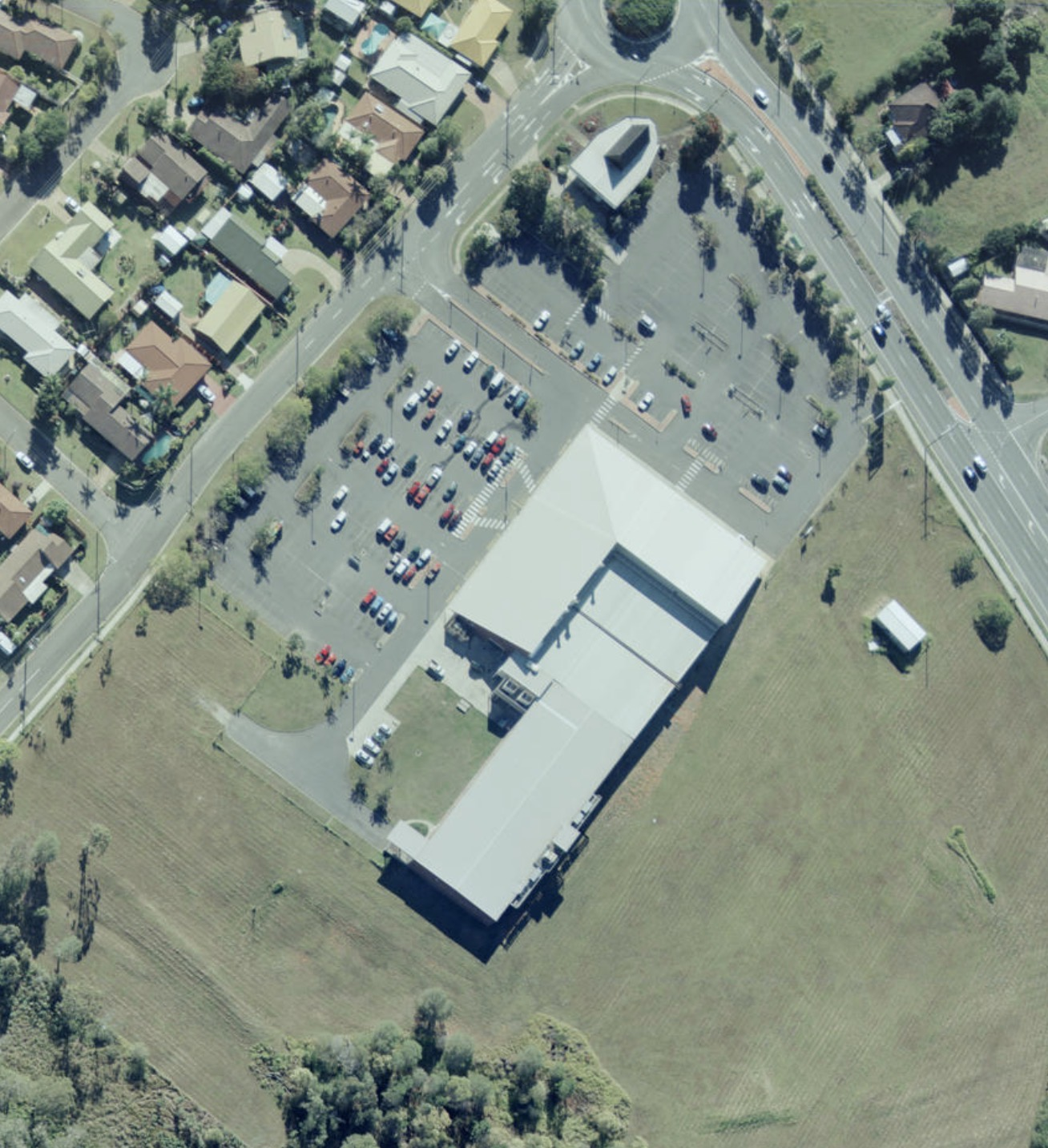
- Aerial view of the Tulip Town shopping centre in Kallangur, 16 June 2001.
- Location: Kallangur, Brisbane Australia
- Coordinates: 27°14′55″S 153°00′38″E
- Opened: 1990
- Closed: 7 August 2003
- Demolished: 2003
- Developer: Declan J H Grant
- Owner: Jim "Jimmy" Grant (1990–1996); Westfield Holdings (1996–2003)
- Num. of stores: 20
- Num. of anchor tenants: Franklins
- Floors: 1

Tulip Town was a shopping centre located on the corner of Anzac Avenue and Cecily Street in Kallangur, Queensland in Australia. It was opened in 1990 featuring 20 shops and an anchor tenant, becoming locally popular in Kallangur. The shopping centre closed in 2003 following a canceled development plan, and was replaced by the larger Westfield North Lakes after it opened on 7 August 2003.

== History ==
The 5.3-hectare block was originally a local family farm owned by a resident named Les Brasch. In 1972, he sold the land to local real estate agent Jimmy Grant, who ran development company Declan J H Grant. At the time, he was envisioning a community shopping hub. In 1989, Grant officially began construction of Tulip Town, and it opened in 1990. It was a single-level neighbourhood centre spanning about 8,100 square metres. The centre would become a popular spot for Kallangur residents, eventually featuring a Franklins supermarket managed by Ian Kew, line-up of 20 specialty shops including a fruit shop, butcher, and a clothing outlet. After opening, Lend lease proposed two bids to buy Tulip Town, for $3.5 million and $4.5 million. However, they were rejected by Grant and in his own words, "I told them on both times to get lost."

In 1996, development giant Westfield bought the site from Jimmy Grant. At the time of sale, locals and the original developer were expecting Westfield to expand Tulip Town into a regional mall. On 21 March 1996, Westfield Holdings entered a contractual agreement with Declan J H Grant to redevelop Tulip Town, although the centre's projected expansion never happened. Hornibrook Bus Lines commenced a service between Tulip Town and Westfield Strathpine via Petrie Station, Route 10 on 13 December 1999. In February 2001, staff rescued a baby after it was found distressed in a Holden Commodore, locked with two unconscious adults. Following the incident, both adults were suspected and charged for being influenced by drugs.

=== Closure ===
Instead of developing Tulip Town, Westfield acquired land up Anzac Avenue in North Lakes for the construction of Westfield North Lakes. Afterwards, Tulip Town was effectively closed in 2003, and the land sat idle as a result.

Demolition of the shopping centre began in late 2003. In 2008, the Moreton Bay Regional Council resumed the site from Westfield, placing a caveat stating that no developer could acquire and redevelop the land until July 2016. The sale was opposed by Grant, stating "the land was zoned for local government purposes and anything contrary to that makes a mockery of the word government,” to the Courier.

=== Redevelopment ===
In 2021, retail developer Property Solutions announced the construction of Murrumba Village over the old site, featuring residences, a shopping and a childcare complex. The 1,415 squared metre childcare centre was set to open in July 2021, including 10 activity rooms and three outdoor play areas. The opening of the village was setback for two years, when Property Solutions faced financial problems and debts, eventually entering voluntary liquidation in May 2023. On 15 September 2023, LEAD Childcare was opened, featuring an art studio, heated swimming pool for year-round swimming lessons, an indoor and outdoor piazza, and large reception area.

== Stores ==
Known stores at Tulip Town:

- Franklins – an anchor supermarket
- Captain Cook Tavern
- Tulip Town Dental Surgery – dentist
- Tulip Town Hairport – hair salon
- Fashion Warehouse – clothing outlet
- Lal's Crazy Bargains – located at lot 13
