= Kippa-Ring line =

Passenger rail service in Queensland, Australia

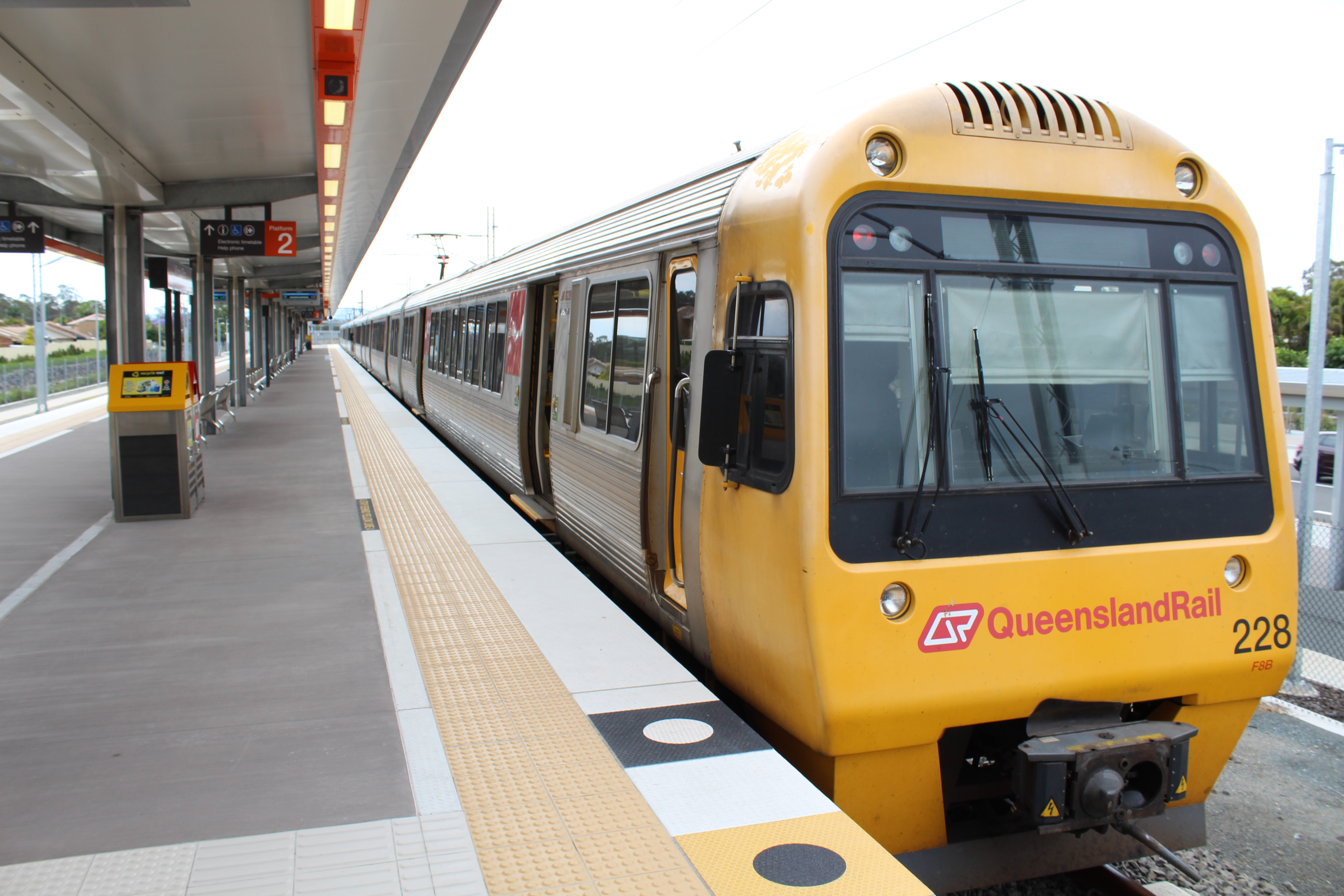
- SMU at Kippa-Ring station in 2016

Overview
- Status: Open
- Owner: Queensland Rail
- Locale: Murrumba Downs, Queensland, Australia
- Termini: Roma Street; Kippa-Ring
- Stations: 6
- Colour on map: Light Blue

Service
- Type: Commuter rail
- Operator: Queensland Rail

History
- Opened: 4 October 2016

Technical
- Line length: 13 km (8.1 mi)
- Num of tracks: Quadruple to Northgate, triple to Petrie, double to Kippa Ring
- Track gauge: 1,067 mm (3 ft 6 in)
- Electrification: 2016
- Operating speed: 100 km/h (62 mph)

The T2 Kippa-Ring line is a suburban commuter railway line in Brisbane, Queensland. Operated by Queensland Rail, the line runs for 40.8 kilometres (25 miles) from Kippa-Ring to Roma Street, where services continue on to the Springfield Central line.

The line was officially opened on 3 October 2016, about 130 years after it was first proposed. The first train to depart from Kippa-Ring was SMU 285 and 295, with the Prime Minister Malcolm Turnbull, Queensland Premier Annastacia Palaszczuk and the first train ballot winners on board.

== Early history ==
A rail line to Redcliffe was first proposed in 1895 when the Queensland Government's Minister for Railways, the Hon. Robert Philp, considered three proposals, preferring a route via North Pine (Petrie). In more recent times, the route for a Redcliffe railway was identified in the 1970s, and the required land was purchased and preserved as a transport corridor by the state government in the 1980s.

== Petrie to Kippa-Ring Public Transport Corridor Study ==
In 1999, the newly elected state government commissioned an investigative study into the transport corridor between Petrie to Kippa-Ring, conducted by GHD Group. Key components under investigation included the mode of transport, the route and location of stations, future public transport usage, and the timing of construction.

The study was conducted in two parts. The first was completed in June 2000. It aimed to meet the state government's obligations to identify or forgo rights to a transport corridor running through the North Lakes residential development. This first stage was to decide on the preferred mode of transport, the viability of public transport along the corridor, and the preferred alignment of the corridor. Four modes of transport were investigated: heavy rail, buses or a busway, light rail, and monorail. It was decided that heavy rail was the preferred mode of transport along the existing preserved corridor as it was the only option to give an acceptable level of economic efficiency. The study found that heavy rail had a benefit-cost ratio of 1.46, and would generate the highest levels of patronage due to its integration into the existing Citytrain network, requiring no change mode.

The second part of the study was completed in October 2003. It looked at the route of the corridor between Petrie railway station and Kallangur railway station at Goodfellows Road. The original, preserved route was recommended.

On 17 December 2001, the Minister for Transport announced public transport improvements between Petrie and Kippa-Ring, planned as part of a staged development of a new rail line in the area, following the release of the recommendations of the draft report of the Petrie to Kippa-Ring Public Transport Corridor Study. The Minister also said that the government was investigating private sector involvement in the construction of the project. On 11 July 2003, the Minister said that the government had not made a commitment on the proposed line, and that it may not go ahead because interest from the private sector in the project was negligible. This was at a time when similar passenger rail public-private partnerships such as the Airtrain to the Brisbane Airport and Airport Link to Sydney Airport were faltering.

In June 2004, Queensland Transport released the Petrie to Kippa-Ring Public Transport Corridor Study's Impact Assessment Study. It claimed that the Impact Assessment Study only looked at costs of the Petrie to Kippa-Ring corridor, and did not take into account commercial-in-confidence costs involved in operating the trains, integrating the services with the rest of the Citytrain network, higher maintenance costs, and the costs of increasing capacity between the Brisbane central business district and Petrie. Based on these higher costs, Queensland Transport deemed the construction of the railway by 2007 could not be justified. The report also said possible savings from a public-private partnership were small and would not provide value for money. Queensland Transport said that it would preserve the corridor until it was required. On 15 June 2004 the government announced $3 million for improving existing bus services along the corridor between Kippa-Ring (Redcliffe) and Petrie "in the short to medium term". However, it again announced the continuing preservation of the reserved corridor for future public transport use.

== Recent history ==
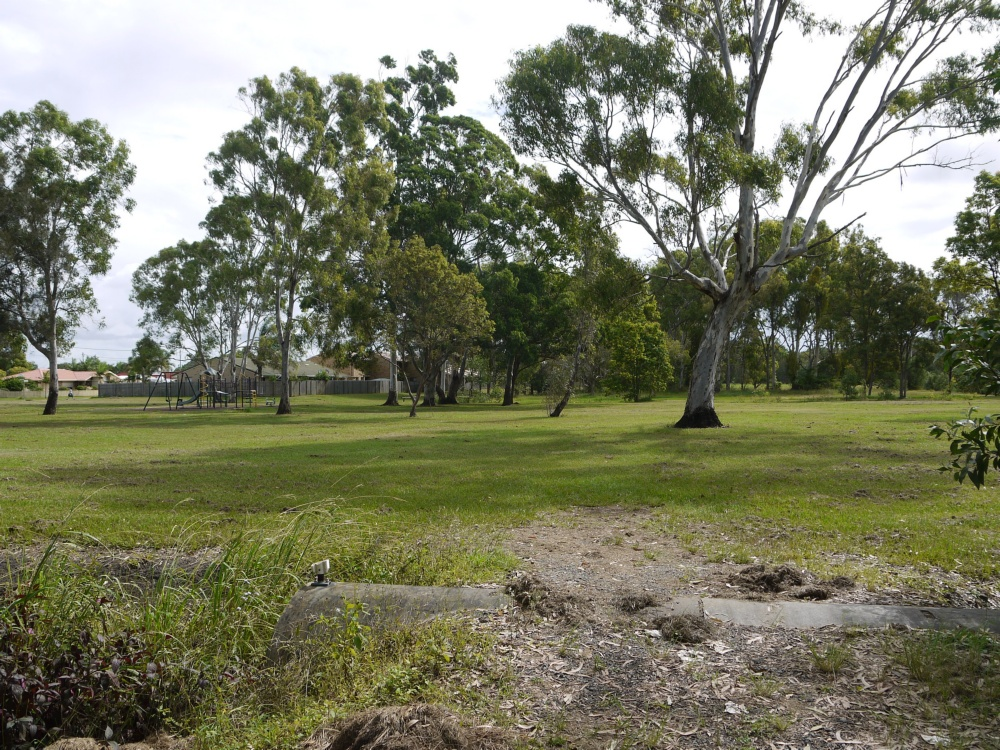
Site of Kippa-Ring railway station prior to construction.

Frustrated by a lack of action by the Government, the Redcliffe City Council (now Moreton Bay City Council) unanimously moved on 4 July 2005 to support a campaign to have the Petrie to Kippa-Ring railway built, and to write to the Minister for Transport to express concern over the decision to not proceed with its construction. In 2007, the Pine Rivers Shire Council (now a part of Moreton Bay City Council, along with Redcliffe City Council) purchased the old Tulip Town shopping centre land at Kallangur for $6 million, with the potential for it to be used with the proposed Kippa-Ring railway line. The site is nearby, but not immediately adjacent to, the location of Murrumba Downs railway station. On 11 August 2008, the then state member for Murrumba whose electorate the proposed line would through, said that there were no plans to construct the railway in the foreseeable future.

The South East Queensland Regional Plan 2009–2031, released in December 2008, identified the preserved corridor in its Transport Infrastructure Network Plan as a "quality rapid transit route". During the 2009 Queensland state election, the then opposition party promised to start the construction of the line in its first term if it was elected, with the first stage of the line from Petrie to Mango Hill commissioned in 2014, and completed to Kippa-Ring by 2016. However, the incumbent government was subsequently returned to power.

During the 2010 federal election, then Prime Minister Julia Gillard announced that the Kippa-Ring railway line would be fast-tracked, with the project to be complete by 2016 at a cost of $1.15 billion. On 3 December 2010, the funding agreement for the project was formalised, after being announced the day before. The agreement was signed by the Prime Minister Julia Gillard, Queensland Premier Anna Bligh and Moreton Bay mayor Allan Sutherland.

The Department of Transport and Main Roads held an industry briefing in Brisbane on 17 August 2012 to provide an update on the Moreton Bay Rail Link Project (MBRL). The Request for Proposal was advertised on 24 August 2012 with responses closing on 21 September 2012. The procurement process to select a single design-and-construct contractor utilised a modified Early Contractor Involvement (ECI) process.

On 1 August 2013, Thiess Pty Ltd, a subsidiary of Leighton Holdings (with designers Aurecon, AECOM and geotechnical subcontractor Golder Associates) was awarded the $650 million contract for the design and construction of the new rail line. Thiess was part of the Trackstar team building the 12.6 kilometres (7.8 mi) Moreton Bay rail link.

On 30 May 2016, The Queensland Government announced that the rail link had been delayed indefinitely from its original mid-late 2016 opening period, due to signalling system faults that had been detected at Petrie, where the new line met the existing rail system. Testing indicated that the signalling system in its current configuration was unable to handle all the simultaneous rail movements at the junction, and would cause train delays right across the entire QR City Network.

On 31 August 2016, the Transport Minister Stirling Hinchliffe announced in Parliament that the Moreton Bay Rail Link would open on 4 October 2016, with an open day the day before.

A shortage of drivers owing to the increased requirements created by the new line resulted in mass cancellations of services across the Brisbane rail network, with over 100 cancelled on 21 October. After an admission of fault, Queensland Rail CEO Helen Gluer resigned over the debacle, as did the chairman Michael Klug. In February 2017, a commission of inquiry found that passengers were faced with train cancellations until at least the end of 2018, because no new drivers out of 200 promised had yet been fully trained. The commission also reported that QR management had not told Transport Minister Stirling Hinchliffe or Treasurer Curtis Pitt about how bad the problem was. Hinchliffe resigned as minister, despite the inquiry not attributing any blame to him, finding that the difficulties were a result of structural and cultural problems within Queensland Rail.

Since completion the infrastructure has been owned by the Department of Transport and Main Roads but was transferred to Queensland Rail in 2019.

On 10 August 2026, the Redcliffe Peninsula line was numbered T2 (along with the Springfield Central line) and renamed the Kippa-Ring line.

== Timeline ==
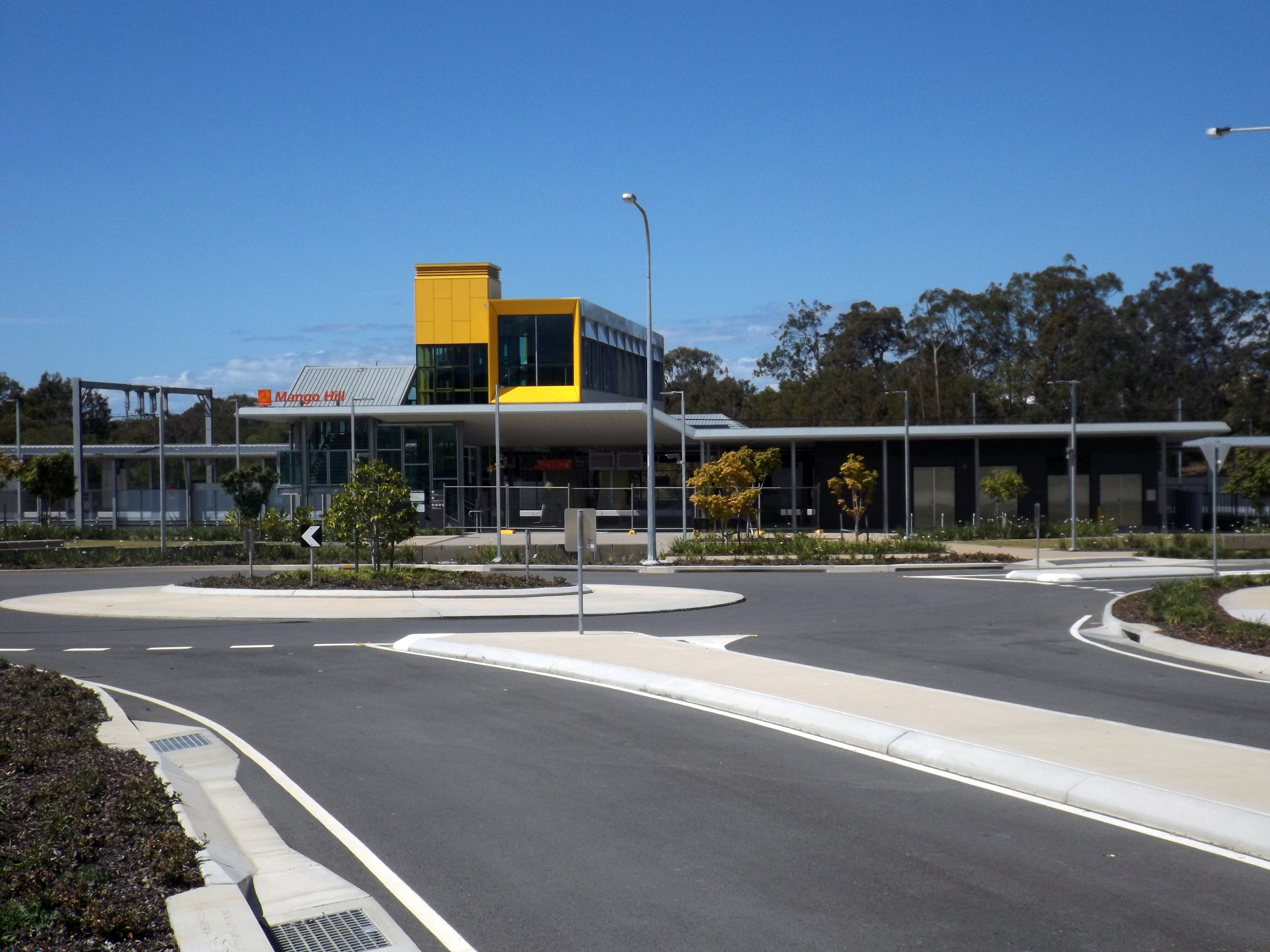
Mango Hill railway station, 2016

Milestones:

- 2003 – Petrie to Kippa-Ring Public Transport Corridor Study completed, provided the foundation for the current project design
- July 2010 – Funding agreement signed between local, state and commonwealth government
- January 2012 – Design of six new stations begins
- July 2012 – Construction on Kinsellas Road East bridge begins after construction contract awarded to McIlwain Civil Contractors
- 24 August 2012 – Tender process for rail design and construction begins with the release of a Request for Proposals
- April 2013 – Kinsellas Road East bridge completed and open to traffic
- Mid 2013 – Concept designs for six new stations available
- 1 August 2013 – Contract awarded to Thiess to design and construct the Moreton Bay Rail Link Project
- Late 2013 – Construction begins on the Dohles Rocks Road and Goodfellows Road bridges at Kallangur
- September 2013 – Pre-construction activities begin, including boundary fencing and surveying of utilities and properties
- Early 2014 – Rail corridor construction works begin (embankment, track, structures and stations)
- June 2014 – Construction of rail bridges over the Bruce Highway starts
- March 2015 – Major earthworks including track foundation complete, and laying of ballast and track begins.
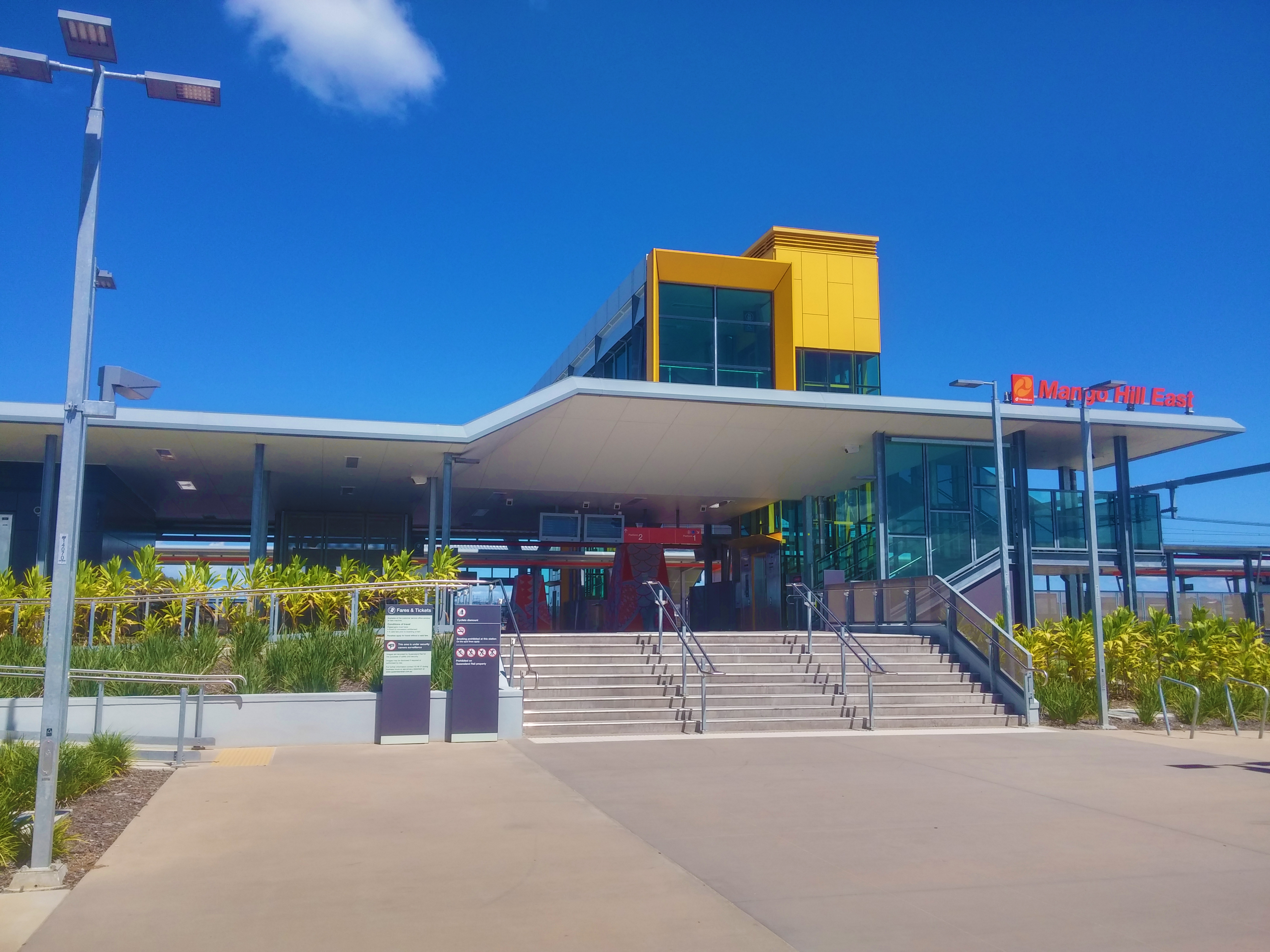
- Mango Hill East Station
  January 2016 – Construction nearly complete. Electric current switched on, and testing of track, overhead wires, train signalling and train stabling yard begins.
- May 2016 – Queensland Rail advised TMR that the signalling is unsafe for handling required number of trains, and the Minister announces a delay in the completion of project.
- May 2016 – QR staff reported as advising that the platform at Petrie is misaligned and trains are scraping the edge as they pass through the station. There is no official confirmation of this.
- 3 October 2016 – Redcliffe Peninsula line declared open by Prime Minister Malcolm Turnbull, Queensland Premier Annastacia Palaszczuk and Moreton Bay Mayor Allan Sutherland, with Moreton Bay residents enjoying free shuttle trains between stations and community events at each station.
- 4 October 2016 – Line opened to passengers.

== Network and operations ==
Most services to and/from Kippa-Ring continue on to the Springfield line. Services run express between Northgate and Bowen Hills, stopping only at Eagle Junction. The typical travel time between Kippa-Ring and Brisbane City is approximately 56 minutes (to Central).

Passengers for/from the Caboolture and Nambour and Gympie North lines change at Petrie, Shorncliffe line at Northgate, Airport and Doomben lines at Eagle Junction, Ferny Grove line at Bowen Hills, and all other lines at Central.

=== Stations ===
List of T2 Kippa-Ring line stations
T2 Kippa-Ring line
Station	Image	Suburb	Opened	Terrain	Connections	Time (Note: Travel time in minutes from Roma Street.)
	Continues from T2 Springfield Central line					
Roma Street		Brisbane CBD	14 June 1875	Ground	Ipswich/Rosewood line Doomben Cleveland line Gold Coast line Beenleigh line Brisbane Metro Bus transport in Queensland	0
Central		Brisbane CBD	18 August 1889	Built over	Sunshine Coast line, Queensland Doomben Shorncliffe line Airport line, Brisbane Ferny Grove line	2 (Note: Service dwells for two minutes.)
Fortitude Valley		Fortitude Valley	1 November 1890	Underground	Sunshine Coast line, Queensland Doomben Shorncliffe line Airport line, Brisbane Ferny Grove line	6
Bowen Hills		Bowen Hills	1973	Ground	Sunshine Coast line, Queensland Doomben Shorncliffe line Airport line, Brisbane Ferny Grove line	8
Eagle Junction		Clayfield	1882	Ground	Sunshine Coast line, Queensland Doomben Shorncliffe line Airport line, Brisbane	13
Northgate		Northgate	1882	Ground	Sunshine Coast line, Queensland Shorncliffe line	17
Virginia		Virginia	1888	Ground	none	19
Sunshine		Geebung	1954	Ground	none	20
Geebung		Geebung	1888	Ground	none	22
Zillmere		Zillmere	1888	Ground	none	24
Carseldine		Carseldine	1986	Ground	none	27
Bald Hills		Bald Hills	1888	Ground	none	30
Strathpine		Strathpine	1888	Ground	none	33
Bray Park		Strathpine	1986	Ground	none	35
Lawnton		Lawnton	1888	Ground	none	38
Petrie		Petrie	1888	Ground	Sunshine Coast line, Queensland	41
Kallangur		Kallangur	3 October 2016	Elevated	none	44
Murrumba Downs		Murrumba Downs	3 October 2016	Ground	none	46
Mango Hill		Mango Hill	3 October 2016	Ground	none	49
Mango Hill East		Mango Hill	3 October 2016	Ground	none	51
Rothwell		Rothwell	3 October 2016	Ground	none	54
Kippa-Ring		Kippa-Ring	3 October 2016	Ground	none	58
