= Murrumba Downs railway station =

Railway station in Queensland, Australia

Coordinates: 27.25168°S 153.01222°E

Murrumba Downs
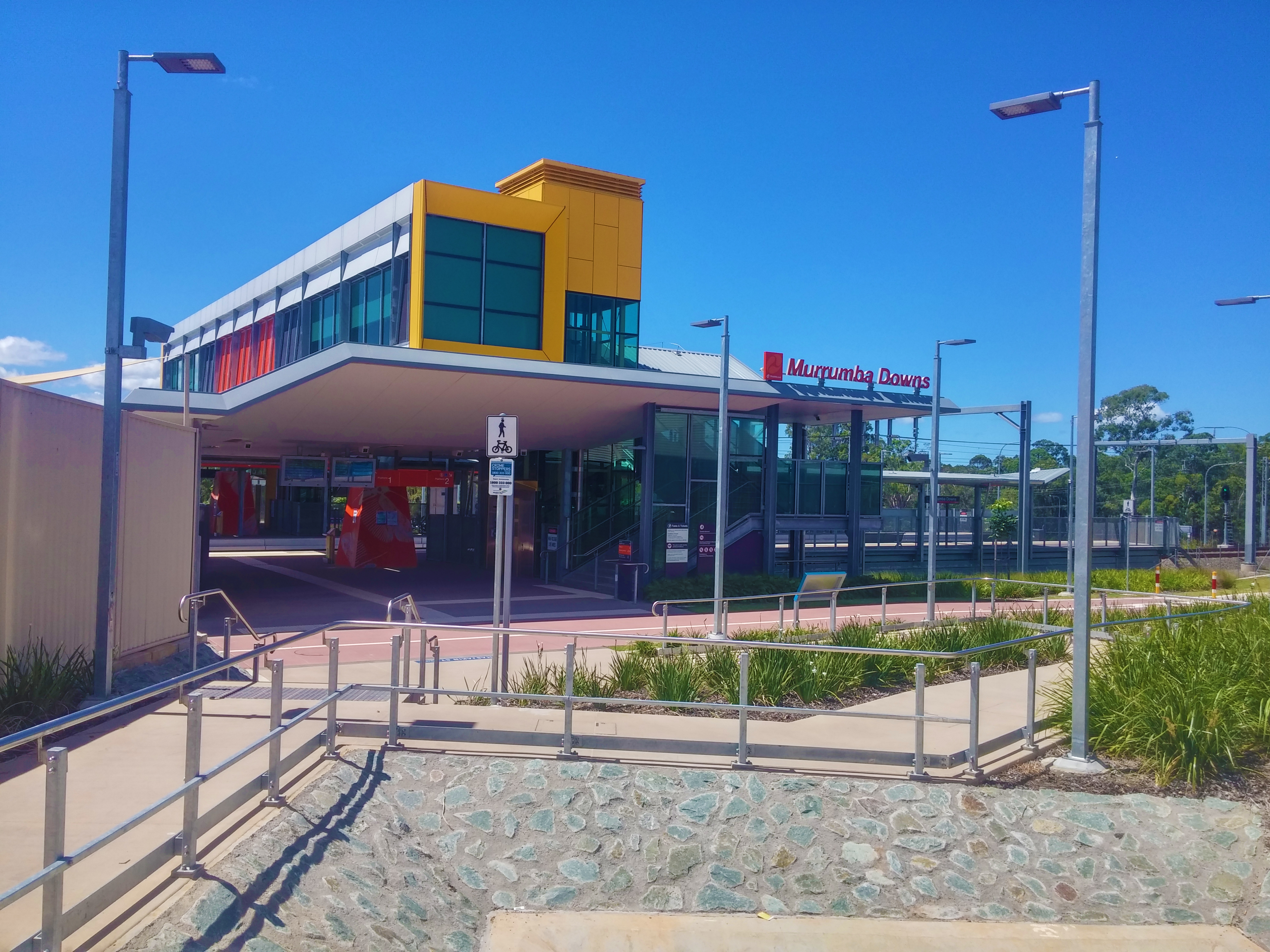
- West entrance of station in January 2017

General information
- Location: Brays Road, Murrumba Downs
- Owner: Queensland Rail
- Operator: Queensland Rail
- Line: Redcliffe Peninsula
- Distance: 31.48 kilometres from Central
- Platforms: 2 side

Construction
- Structure type: Ground
- Parking: 1,000 spaces
- Accessible: Yes

Other information
- Station code: 600641 (platform 1); 600642 (platform 2)
- Fare zone: Zone 3

History
- Opened: 4 October 2016; 9 years ago

Services
Preceding station	Queensland Rail	Following station
Kallangur towards Springfield Central via Roma Street	Redcliffe Peninsula line	Mango Hill towards Kippa-Ring
Location

Murrumba Downs is a railway station operated by Queensland Rail on the Redcliffe Peninsula line. It opened in 2016 and serves the Moreton Bay suburb of Murrumba Downs. It is a ground level station, featuring two side platforms.

== Services ==
Murrumba Downs is served by trains operating from Kippa-Ring to Roma Street and Springfield Central. Some afternoon weekday services continue to Ipswich.

== Services by platform ==
Murrumba Downs platform arrangement
Platform	Line	Destinations	Notes
1	Redcliffe Peninsula	Roma Street, Springfield Central & Ipswich	
2	Redcliffe Peninsula	Kippa-Ring	

== Transport links ==
Thompsons Bus Service operates one bus route via Murrumba Downs station:

- 679: Murrumba Downs to North Lakes
