= Kallangur railway station =

Railway station in Queensland, Australia

Coordinates: 27.25743°S 152.99865°E

Kallangur
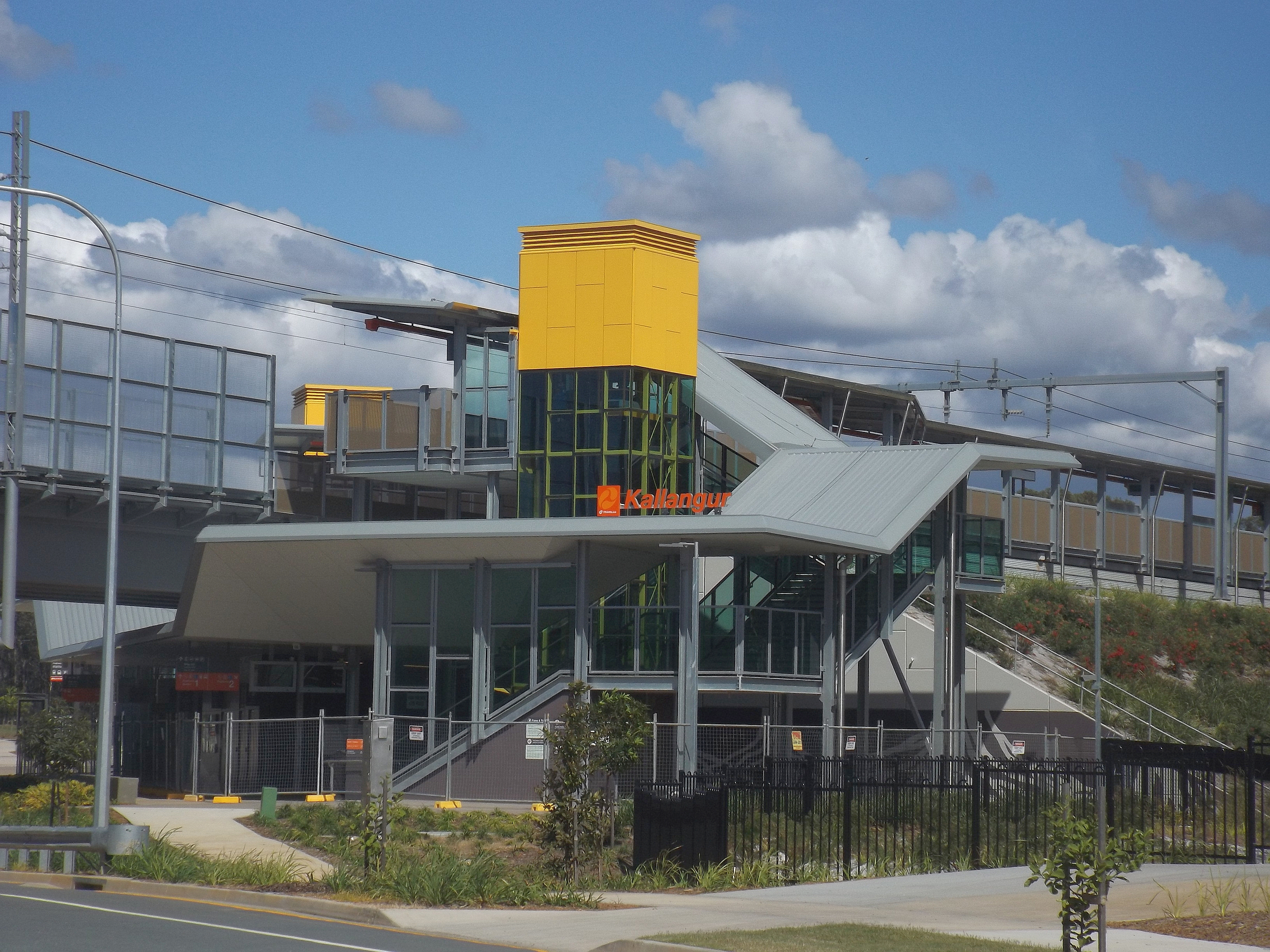
- Station front in August 2016

General information
- Location: Kallangur
- Owner: Queensland Rail
- Operator: Queensland Rail
- Line: T2 Kippa-Ring
- Distance: 30.21 kilometres from Central
- Platforms: 2 side

Construction
- Structure type: Elevated
- Parking: 300 spaces
- Accessible: Yes

Other information
- Station code: 600643 (platform 1); 600644 (platform 2)
- Fare zone: Zone 3
- Website: Queensland Rail

History
- Opened: 4 October 2016; 10 years ago

Services
Preceding station	Queensland Rail	Following station
Petrie towards Springfield Central	Kippa-Ring line	Murrumba Downs towards Kippa-Ring
Location

Kallangur is a railway station operated by Queensland Rail on the Redcliffe Peninsula line. It opened in 2016 and serves the Moreton Bay suburb of Kallangur. It is an elevated station, featuring two side platforms.

Construction of the station was delayed after design problems in the nearby road-over-rail bridges were identified.

== Services ==
Kallangur is served by trains operating from Kippa-Ring to Roma Street and Springfield Central. Some afternoon weekday services continue to Ipswich.

== Services by platform ==
Kallangur platform arrangement
Platform	Line	Destinations	Notes
1	Redcliffe Peninsula	Roma Street, Springfield Central & Ipswich	
2	Redcliffe Peninsula	Kippa-Ring	

== Transport links ==
Hornibrook Bus Lines operate three bus routes via Kallangur station:

- 683: to Dakabin
- 684: to North Lakes
- 685: to North Lakes

Thompsons Bus Service operates one bus route via Kallangur station:

- 676: Murrumba Downs to North Lakes
