= Mueller College =

Location
- 75 Morris Road; Rothwell, Queensland; Australia; 27.212°S 153.061°E

Information
- Type: Private, Christian
- Motto: Knowledge and Obedience in Christ
- Established: 1990
- Principal: Paul Valese
- Grades: P–12
- Enrolment: 1575 (2018)
- Colours: Navy blue, red and white
- Website: mueller.qld.edu.au

Mueller College is an independent, non-denominational Christian, co-educational, P-12, school, located in the suburb of Rothwell within the City of Moreton Bay in Queensland, Australia. It is administered by Independent Schools Queensland, with an enrolment of 1,790 students and a teaching staff of 153, as of 2023. The school is named in reference to George Müller, a Christian evangelist who established 117 schools and offered Christian education to more than 120,000 students.

== History ==
The school opened on 30 January 1990, as a ministry of the Mueller Community Church, which is a member church of Christian Community Churches of Australia.

The Mueller Performing Arts Centre (MPAC) was established in 2009 as a 1,000-seat multi-purpose theatre at Mueller College in Rothwell, Queensland. The facility was designed to support the school's performing arts programs while also functioning as a regional cultural hub for community events and touring productions.

In 2009, the principal at the time, Colin Krueger, admitted the school still used the cane, but at the request of parents. However, by 2011, the school had moved away from corporal punishment, due to community outrage.

The school set the record in the University of Queensland’s annual sunflower competition in 2014.

By August 2018, Mueller College had a total enrolment population of 1,575 students from Preparatory to Year 12.

It was reported that a student was sexually assaulted by his fellow peers in 2022, with the school captain being wrongfully identified as the culprit, an apology was issued by the Courier Mail for this mistake.

In October 2024, it was reported that students of the school were being investigated by the police for sharing a "rape list" via social media. According to the school, "immediate steps to discipline the students who were involved" was taken.

Bristol House was established in April 2026 as a dedicated administration and wellbeing facility at Mueller College. The building was designed to centralise school administration while providing a dedicated space to support student worship, prayer, and holistic wellbeing services.

== Vocational education ==
VET courses available to students include:

- Certificate II in Skills for Work and Vocational Pathways (FSK20113)
- Certificate III in Business (BSB30115)
- Certificate III in Hospitality (SIT30616)/Certificate III in Events (SIT30516)

== Extracurricular activities ==
Extracurricular activities available to students at Mueller College include:

- The MUROC Radio Controlled Plane Club, in which students learn how to design, build, fly and maintain model aircraft
- The Infinity Program for academically advanced students
- Mission trips through Australian Mission Outreach Support (AMOS)
- Vella & Apphia development programs for students in Years 7–10
- Music tours

== School Houses ==
House	Colour
Moreton	Yellow
Stradbroke	Green
Bribie	Blue
Fraser	Maroon

== Notable Events ==
- Mueller Fete, which regularly attracts over 5000 people is held annually in July.
- You Belong Week, is an anti-bullying week where students dress up in orange in support of the Leukemia Foundation.

== See also ==
- List of schools in Greater Brisbane
