= Hornibrook Bus Lines =

Bus operator of Brisbane, Queensland, Australia

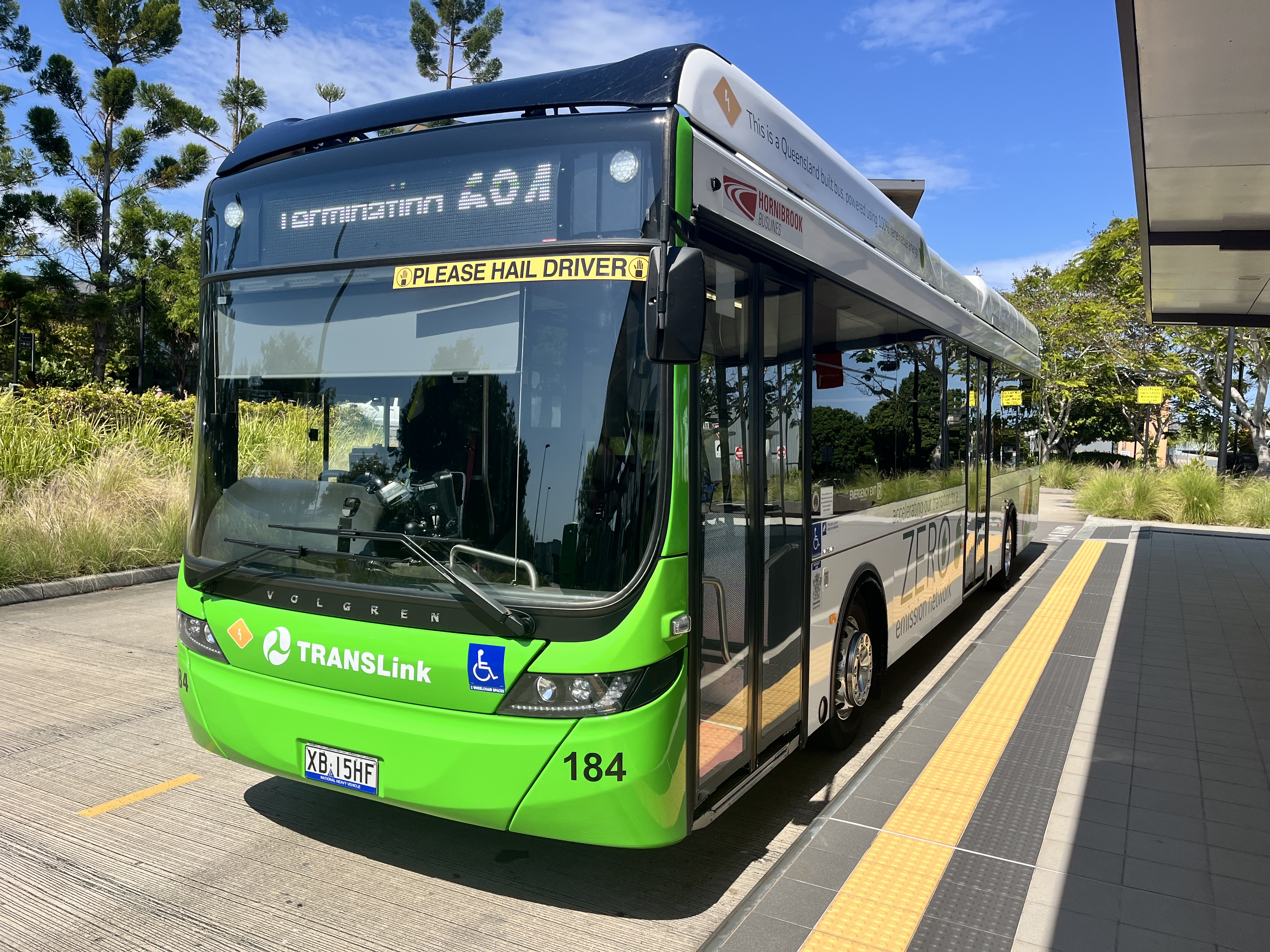
- Volgren Optimus bodied Volvo BZL battery electric bus at North Lakes bus station in October 2024
- Parent: Keolis Australia
- Founded: 1935
- Headquarters: Clontarf
- Service area: Redcliffe Peninsula
- Service type: Bus operator
- Routes: 17
- Hubs: Kippa-Ring
- Stations: Kippa-Ring; North Lakes
- Depots: 2
- Fleet: 64 (December 2022)
- Website: www.hornibrook.com.au

Hornibrook Bus Lines is an Australian operator of bus services in the Redcliffe Peninsula and surrounding Upper Bayside area of Brisbane. It operates 17 services under contract to the Queensland Government under the Translink banner.

== History ==
In August 1935 Hornibrook Highway Bus Service commenced operating a service from Redcliffe to Sandgate station.

In 1975 Hornibrook Bus Lines was purchased by Geoff Mountjoy. By the late 1980s it had purchased Redcliffe-Brisbane Bus Service and Sandgate-Lutwyche Bus Service.

In 1998 South Western Suburban Transit was purchased.

In 2015 Keolis Downer purchased Hornibrook Bus Lines along with the other franchises operated by Australian Transit Enterprise and is the current parent company to Hornibrook Bus Lines.

== Routes ==
Route	From	To	Via	Notes
680	Redcliffe	Chermside	Kippa-Ring station, North Lakes station, Petrie station & Strathpine Centre	
681	North Lakes	Mango Hill	Mango Hill station	AM service, loop service
682	North Lakes	Mango Hill	Mango Hill station	PM service, loop service
683	Dakabin	Kallangur	Marsden Road & Old Gympie Road	loop service
684	North Lakes	Kallangur	Duffield Road & Kallangur Fair	
685	North Lakes	Kallangur	Old Gympie Road	
686	Frenchs Forest	Petrie	Petrie	loop service
687	North Lakes	Mango Hill	Mango Hill station & North Lakes station	
688	North Lakes	North Lakes	North Lakes station	loop service
689	North Lakes	North Lakes	North Lakes station	loop service
690	Redcliffe	Sandgate	Kippa-Ring station, Scarborough, Redcliffe, Margate, Clontarf & Brighton	
691	Scarborough	Sandgate	Brighton, Clontarf & Redcliffe	
694	Kippa-Ring	Redcliffe	Clontarf, Margate Village Shopping Centre	
696	Kippa-Ring	Redcliffe	Boardman Road, Waterfront, Woody Point & Margate	
698	Rothwell	Kippa-Ring	Morris Road	
699	Redcliffe	Kippa-Ring	Scarborough & Newport	
N310	Brisbane CBD	Sandgate	Fortitude Valley, Bowen Hills, Clayfield, Toombul Bus Interchange, Nundah, Virginia, Boondall & Deagon	Nightlink Bus

== Fleet ==
As of March 2025, Hornibrook Bus Lines operates 64 buses, with 14 additional extra buses being loaned to the operator by the Department of Transport and Main Roads.

Buses operated by Hornibrook Bus Lines include:

- 1x Scania L94UB Volgren CR228L
- 24x Scania K230UB Volgren CR228L
- 10x Scania K280UB Volgren CR228L
- 4x Mercedes-Benz O500LE Bustech VST Mk IV
- 6x Mercedes-Benz O500LE Volgren Optimus
- 3x Scania K320UB Volgren Optimus
- 16x Volvo BZL Volgren Optimus
- 14x Department of Transport and Main Roads Volvo B8RLE Volgren Optimus

== Depots ==
=== Clontarf ===
==== Information ====
Clontarf depot is the current main depot for buses servicing the urban routes Hornibrook Bus Lines operate within the Redcliffe Area. It is located on 19 Grice Street, Clontarf.

==== History ====
In April 1986 a then vacant block of land located along Grice Street, was purchased from the then Redcliffe City Council to establish a new bus depot and office. In June 1986 the depot was officially opened at the cost of $1,000,000 AUD with it being part financed by the sale of the Klinger Road Premises.

=== North Lakes ===
==== Information ====
North Lakes depot is the current main depot servicing the urban routes Hornibrook Bus Lines operated within the North Lakes Area. It is located on 6 Wills Street.

==== History ====
On the 28th of November, 2011 North Lakes depot officially opened to help service the areas Hornibrook Bus Lines operated within that local area. This depot became the last depot to be built under the management of Mountjoy and Cook ownership.

In August 2021, the Queensland Government announced that North Lakes is to receive an overhaul to become Queensland's first fully electric bus depot. This initiative was part of a $15,600,000 AUD deal between Keolis Downer & the then Queensland Government to help modernize public transport as well as to help reduce emissions. Work began sometime in 2021 before finishing mid-late 2023. Not long after the conversion electric bus usage commenced with Volvo BZL Volgren Optimuses being used, these buses can be most commonly found doing the routes Hornibrook Bus Lines operate within the North Lakes Area.
