= Mango Hill railway station =

Railway station in Queensland, Australia

Mango Hill
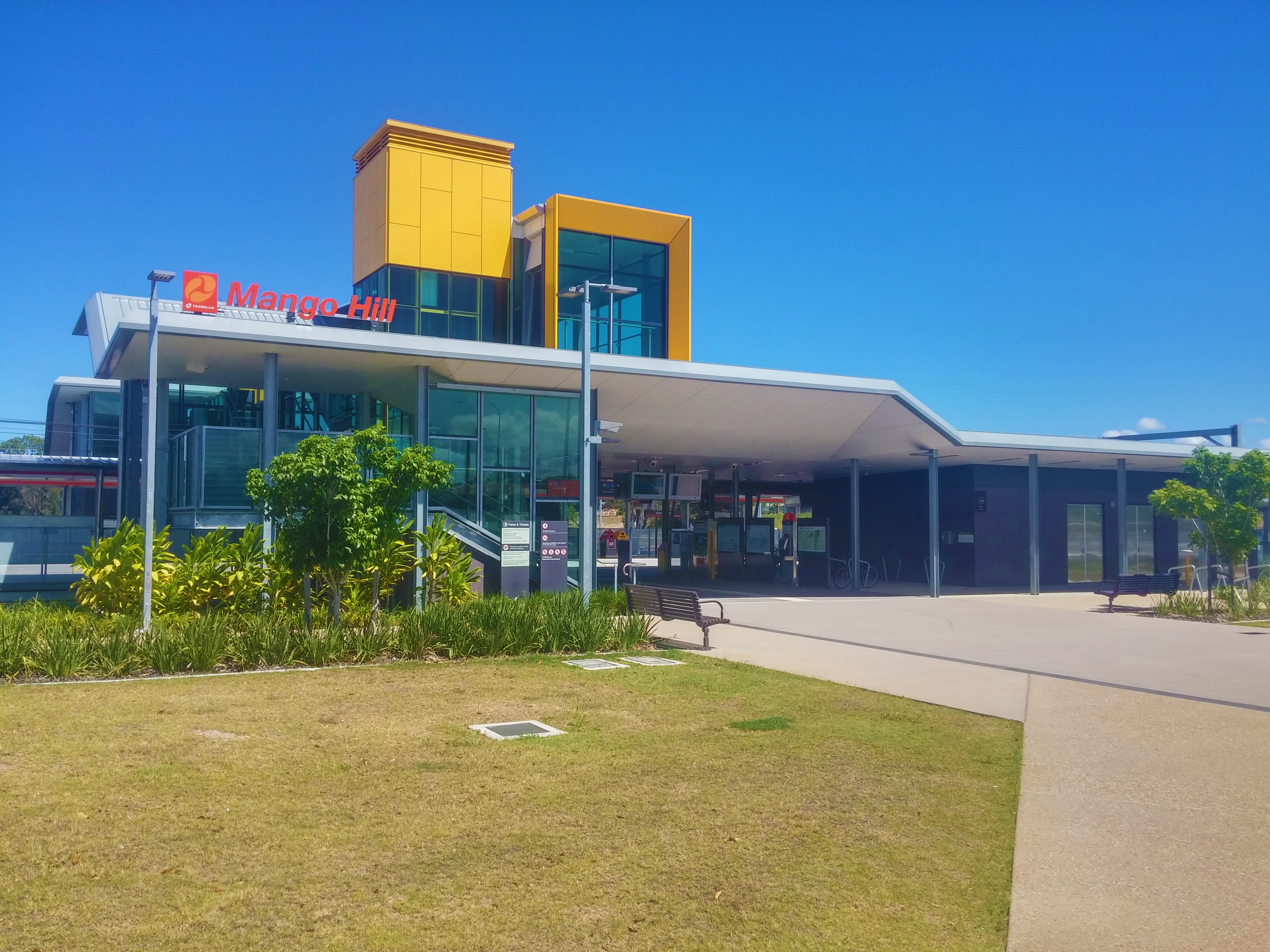
- Station front in January 2017

General information
- Location: Halpine Drive, Mango Hill
- Coordinates: 27.24519°S 153.02790°E
- Owner: Queensland Rail
- Operator: Queensland Rail
- Line: Redcliffe Peninsula
- Distance: 33.25 kilometres from Central
- Platforms: 2 side

Construction
- Structure type: Ground
- Parking: 200 spaces
- Accessible: Yes

Other information
- Station code: 600639 (platform 1); 600640 (platform 2)
- Fare zone: Zone 3

History
- Opened: 4 October 2016; 9 years ago

Services
Preceding station	Queensland Rail	Following station
Murrumba Downs towards Springfield Central via Roma Street	Redcliffe Peninsula line	Mango Hill East towards Kippa-Ring
Location

Mango Hill is a railway station operated by Queensland Rail on the Redcliffe Peninsula line. It opened in 2016 and serves the Moreton Bay suburb of Mango Hill. It is a ground level station, featuring two side platforms.

== Services ==
Mango Hill is served by trains operating from Kippa-Ring to Roma Street and Springfield Central. Some afternoon weekday services continue to Ipswich.

== Services by platform ==
Mango Hill platform arrangement
Platform	Line	Destinations	Notes
1	Redcliffe Peninsula	Roma Street, Springfield Central & Ipswich	
2	Redcliffe Peninsula	Kippa-Ring	

== Transport links ==
Hornibrook Bus Lines operate three bus routes via Mango Hill station:

- 681: Mango Hill to North Lakes
- 682: Mango Hill to North Lakes
- 687: to North Lakes
