= Grace Lutheran College =

Location
- Redcliffe And Caboolture, Queensland; Australia; 27°13′5″S 153°3′27″E

Information
- Type: Private, co-educational, secondary, day school
- Motto: Grit Growth Grace; Grace Alone; Going the Grace Way
- Religious affiliation: Lutheran Church of Australia
- Established: 1978
- Principal: David Radke
- Pastor: Stephen Cronau
- Chaplain: Kris Forman, Rachel Hayes (Rothwell), Maria Wolter (Caboolture), Nick Warren (Caboolture)
- Grades: 7–12
- Enrolment: ~1,800 (Rothwell) and 400–450 (Caboolture)
- Campus: Rothwell and Caboolture
- Houses: Antares (red), Orion (green), Pegasus (white), Phoenix (blue)
- Colours: Brown, white, gold and green
- Website: www.glc.qld.edu.au

Grace Lutheran College (GLC) or simply Grace, founded in 1978, is a co-educational, private high school based in Rothwell and Caboolture in Queensland, Australia. Grace Lutheran Primary School is located in Clontarf, approximately a 10-minute drive from the main Grace College Campus at Rothwell. The current principal is David Radke, who took up the post in 2017 after the school's second principal, Ruth Butler, retired. The college's enrolment at the start of the 2011 school year was over 1800. Grace Lutheran College is a Christian school of the Lutheran Church of Australia.

== History ==
The college was first opened in 1977 with the Caboolture campus being founded in 2008. In February 1978, Viv Kuhl (retired deputy principal) became the first teacher at the school with an initial pupil count of 15. In 1980 the school moved to Anzac Avenue in Rothwell with 55 students and 5 teachers and with Fred Stolz as the first headmaster.

== Educational subjects ==
=== Academic ===
Grace Lutheran College currently enrols students in Years 7–12. Before 2008, the school only enrolled from year 8–12, however Year 7s were incorporated in 2015. This leaves years 7–9 as the middle school and 10–12 as the senior school. 2008 saw the completion of the Caboolture campus of Grace Lutheran College, currently enrolling year 7 to 12 students and was officially opened on 24 May 2008.

Each year, the college pays the entry fees for every one of its students to participate in the University of New South Wales academic competitions in Mathematics, Science, and English. The college often scores a high number of awards in these events. Subsequently, various departments allow students to enter academic competitions voluntarily, with the school paying the entry fees for the students to do so.

=== Performing arts ===
The college has a Performing Arts department which is called Grace Academy. Each year, Performing Arts students have a variety of plays and productions as part of their course, usually, but not always, including junior and doing senior productions every second year. Every second year, the college also hosts a musical production, which is often popular within the community. Almost all of the production cast and crew are made up of students, with directing taken up by Performing Arts teachers.

=== Robotics ===
The School has a purpose-built Robotics teaching space; the college uses these facilities to train teachers and students in STEM developments in the area of Robotics. Staff from institutions in the United States and South East Asia have visited Grace Lutheran College to learn about FIRST Robotics Competition. In 2016, Grace participated in FRC again with their robot, Exodus, coming 27th out of 52 teams internationally, and in 2017 they participated with their robot, Ezra, where they came 8th out of 39 teams internationally and in the finals placing 6th.

== Sport ==
The college promotes a variety of sports which includes Aussie Rules, Baseball, Basketball, Cricket, Futsal, Gaelic Football, Hockey, Netball, Rugby League, Rugby Union, Soccer, Softball, Squash, Tennis, Touch, Volleyball and Water Polo.

The college participated in the Moreton Bay and Caboolture district where it won a large majority of competitions. After winning the district or zone final, the school has the chance to compete in Metropolitan finals, where it won.

In 1996, Grace Lutheran College performed on the TV show A*mazing; they won against Vienna Woods.

Grace Lutheran College is the current metropolitan champion in:

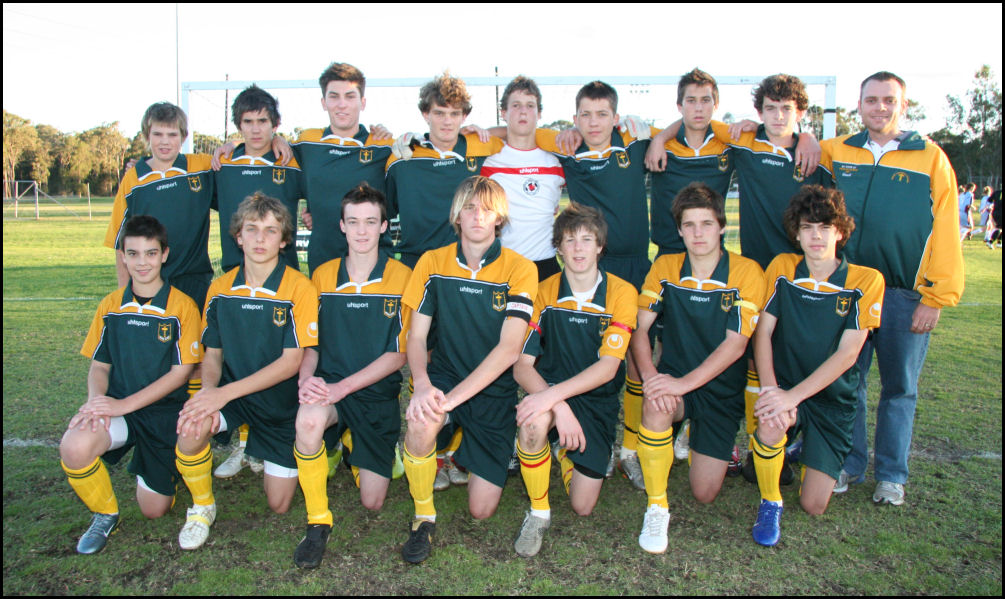
Grace College 2007 Bill Turner Cup Team

- Open Girls Softball
- Open Boys Soccer
- Open Girls Soccer
- Open Boys Australian Rules Football
- Open Girls Golf (Ellen Davies-Graham)
- Open Boys Futsal
- BSGSA Girls Australian Rules Football
- Year 10 Girls Softball
- Year 10 Baseball
- Year 10 Boys Tennis
- Year 10 Girls Basketball
- Year 10 Girls Netball
- Year 9 Girls Soccer
- Year 8 Girls Netball
- Vicki Wilson Girls Netball (Winner of Sunshine Coast)
- Independent Schools Australian Rules Football

The school has no excellence or scholarship program in place but has a history of succeeding in district and metropolitan finals and co-curricular competitions such as ISSA, Uhlsport Cup, and Bill Turner Cup. Soccer achievements include the girls' Uhlsport Cup in 2006, the ISSA Cup in 1996, 1997, 2000, 2002, 2006, 2011, and 2012, and the final 8 of the 2007 Bill Turner Cup. The boys have also made the semi-finals in both the Uhlsport Cup in 2008 and Bill Turner Cup in 2007. In 2007, student Robbie Buhmann was also named star player of the 2007 Bill Turner Cup, a nationwide competition.

== Notable alumni ==
- Kylie Palmer – 2008 Olympic Gold Medalist
- Jodie Bowering – 2008 Olympic Bronze Medalist
- Joel Naughton – Philadelphia Phillies and national team catcher
- Paul Aiton – Cronulla Sharks and Papua New Guinea national rugby league
- Taylor McKeown – 2014 Commonwealth Games Medalist for 200m breaststroke
- Izaack Powell – Brisbane Roar soccer player
- Kaylee McKeown – Olympic 3x Gold Medalist in 100m Backstroke, 200m backstroke and 4 × 100 m medley. She is also a bronze medalist in 4 x 100 mixed medley and Youth Olympian. (at school briefly before transferring to Pacific Lutheran College)

== A*Mazing ==
Grace Lutheran College participated in the television show A*Mazing in 1996, winning against Vienna Woods State School.
