= Rothwell railway station =

Railway station in Queensland, Australia

Rothwell
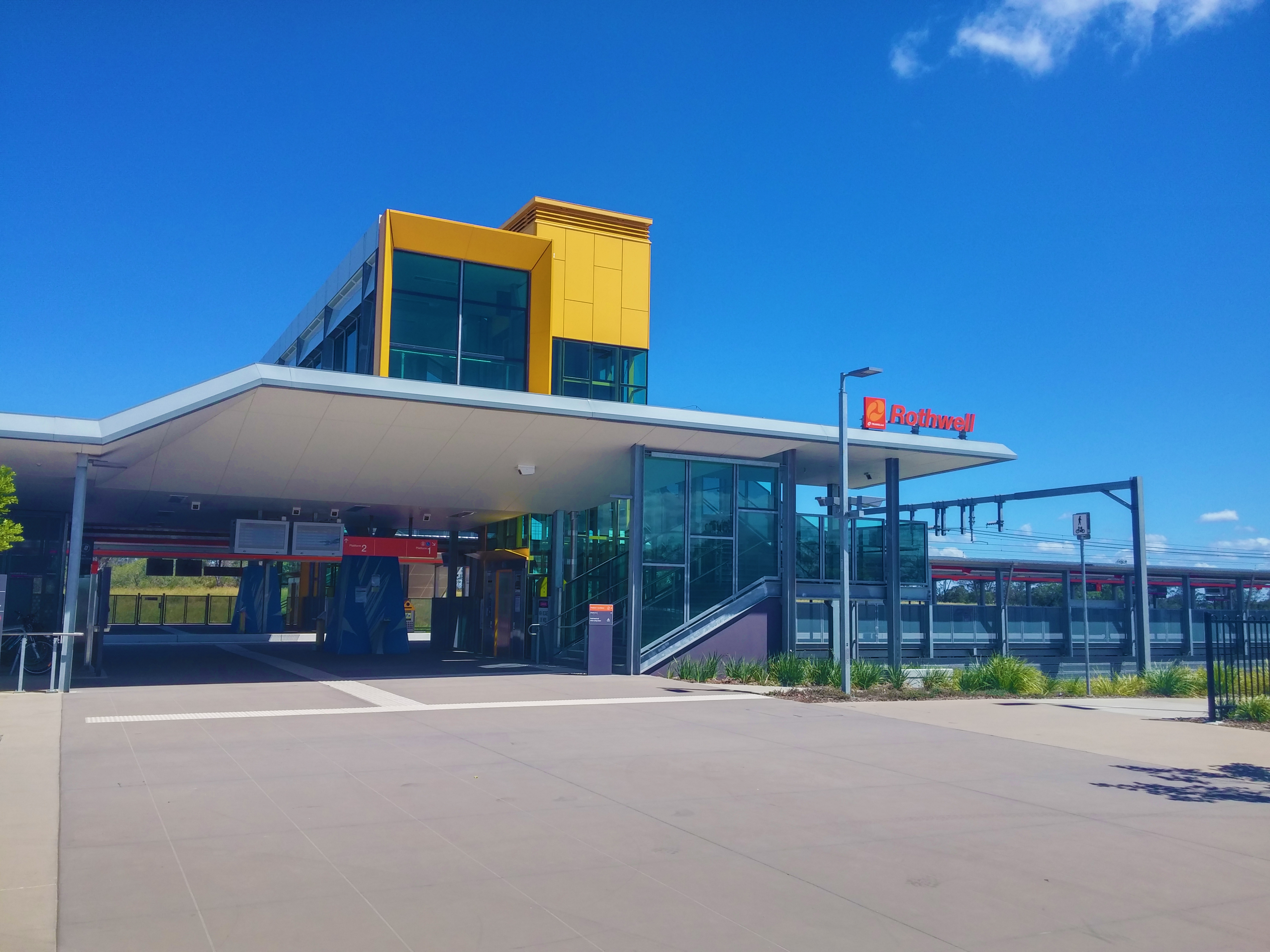
- Station front in January 2017

General information
- Location: Rothwell
- Coordinates: 27.2220°S 153.0493°E
- Owner: Queensland Rail
- Operator: Queensland Rail
- Line: Redcliffe Peninsula
- Distance: 36.48 kilometres from Central
- Platforms: 2 side

Construction
- Structure type: Ground
- Parking: 600 spaces
- Accessible: Yes

Other information
- Station code: 600635 (platform 1); 600636 (platform 2)
- Fare zone: Zone 3
- Website: Queensland Rail

History
- Opened: 4 October 2016; 9 years ago

Services
Preceding station	Queensland Rail	Following station
Mango Hill East towards Springfield Central via Roma Street	Redcliffe Peninsula line	Kippa-Ring Terminus
Location

Rothwell is a railway station operated by Queensland Rail on the Redcliffe Peninsula line. It opened in 2016 and serves the Moreton Bay suburb of Rothwell. It is a ground level station, featuring two side platforms.

== Services ==
Rothwell is served by trains operating from Kippa-Ring to Roma Street and Springfield Central. Some afternoon weekday services continue to Ipswich.

== Services by platform ==
Rothwell platform arrangement
Platform	Line	Destinations	Notes
1	Redcliffe Peninsula	Roma Street, Springfield Central & Ipswich	
2	Redcliffe Peninsula	Kippa-Ring	

== Transport links ==
Hornibrook Bus Lines operates one bus route to and from Rothwell station:

- 698: to Kippa-Ring station

Kangaroo Bus Lines operate two routes to and from Rothwell station:

- 662: to Deception Bay
- 665: to Deception Bay
