= North Lakes State College =

Location
- North Lakes, Queensland; Australia; 27.237283°S 153.024879°E

Information
- Type: Public, College
- Motto: Learn, Lead, Succeed
- Established: 2002
- Principal: John Thornberry
- Grades: Prep to 12
- Enrolment: 2,280 (2023)
- Colours: Purple, navy blue, white and cyan

North Lakes State College is a public, co-educational, P-12, school located in the City of Moreton Bay suburb of North Lakes in Queensland, Australia. It is administered by the Department of Education, with an enrolment of 2,280 students and a teaching staff of 190, as of 2023.

The school serves students from Prep to Year 12, on two campuses, with the main campus situated on Joyner Circuit, and the second campus, known as the Urban Learning Centre, is situated on North Lakes Drive.

== History ==
The State Government allocated $24 million towards the construction of the college, with the Commonwealth contributing $19.4 million. According to Minister for Education and Training and Minister for the Arts Welford, it was built around a circular ‘spine’, with the design of the facilities taking into account of the various stages of school life.

The school was opened on 1 January 2002 as a P–3 college with an enrollment of approximately 150 students, 75 of which were in Prep and the other 75 were enrolled in Years 1–3. In 2003, Years 4, 5 and 6 were introduced to the college, along with the facilities known as the Villa Precinct. 2004 saw the introduction of Year 7, and the facilities known as the Lodge Precinct opened. This year also saw a large development across the site in preparation for the introduction of the secondary component of Years 8 and 9 in 2005. In 2006, North Lakes State College established the Facilitation Agreement with the Moreton Bay Regional Council for the shared use of the nearby North Lakes Library and town common in the upper campus and sports hall and oval in the lower campus. Monthly meetings were held to discuss issues.

The year 2006 saw the introduction of Year 10 and the construction of the Urban Learning Centre, with the Senior Secondary years of Year 11 introduced in 2007 and Year 12 introduced in 2008. In 2010, the agreement ceased after the Department of Education acquired the library, sports hall and ovals. The council now leases the swimming pool located at the upper campus and various sports group have made arrangements to use the sports ovals.

On 28 May 2018, an online shooting threat emerged on forum 4chan, stating “A school in North Lakes QLD is going to get professionally shot up with as many casualties as possible,” featuring images of students involved in the Columbine shooting. In response, police presence was increased across Brisbane's North Lakes areas, with North Lakes State College among them. Two days later, a teenager was arrested by police for posting a copycat threat, charged with one count each of using a carriage service to make a threat to cause serious harm and violence. In 2018, a five-storey vertical senior campus began construction by building contractor Hutchies Builders. The new facility was located on a tight urban site, making the construction of multiple stories necessary, which included general learning areas, staff rooms, special education, music spaces, a roof top terrace, lecture theatre, and Student Well Being Space. It was completed in 2019, taking 64 weeks to build and costing approximately $15.2m. The development was described as being state-of-the-art, as it was one of the first of its kind in Queensland.

== Facilities ==
In June 2016, the lower (main) campus had the following facilities: 14 bungalows, 6 cottages, 3 lodges, 3 terraces all fitted with classrooms. There is also a main campus advancement centre for administration, main campus discovery building, main campus client services building, main campus strategic services building, and main campus team learning centre. The lodge, villa court, terraces, amphitheatre, entry statement, and prep areas received a school shade structure. There are 6 grounds sheds for fuel, prep storage, and sports equipment. Sports facilities include multiple sports ovals, four tennis courts, and four multipurpose courts.

Facilities in the upper campus included a leisure centre with an outdoor swimming pool, canteen and amenities, pool pump shed, and two indoor swimming pools. There is a multipurpose block, administration block, cafe, pathway resource centre, a sports hall, and an advancement centre.

These facilities are fitted with an auditorium, virtual reality room, robotics laboratory, cafes, performing arts complex, hospitality kitchens, library, dance and drama studios, international student room, Year 12 Student commons area, Media Arts lab, Music Studios and practice spaces, swimming pool, Manual Arts and workshops.

=== Programs ===
The school hosts multiple sports and extracurricular programs. This includes Signature Golf, Signature Basketball, Signature Rugby Union, Signature Dance, Inspire Academy for years 7–9 and iLearn for years 4–9.

Programs include

- Enrichment and extension programs
- International Competitions and Assessment for Schools (ICAS) in mathematics, science, English and computing
- Instrumental music program and competitions
- Regional, state and national robotics competitions
- Dance, music and choir performances
- Comprehensive range of vocational education courses for years 10–12
- Debating

Extracurricular activities include

- School and Outdoor Education Camps
- Instrumental Music Program
- International Study Tour Programs
- Robotics
- Get Smart homework program for years 7–9
- Subject Tutorials for years 10–12
