= Mango Hill, Queensland =

Mango Hill
- Suburb
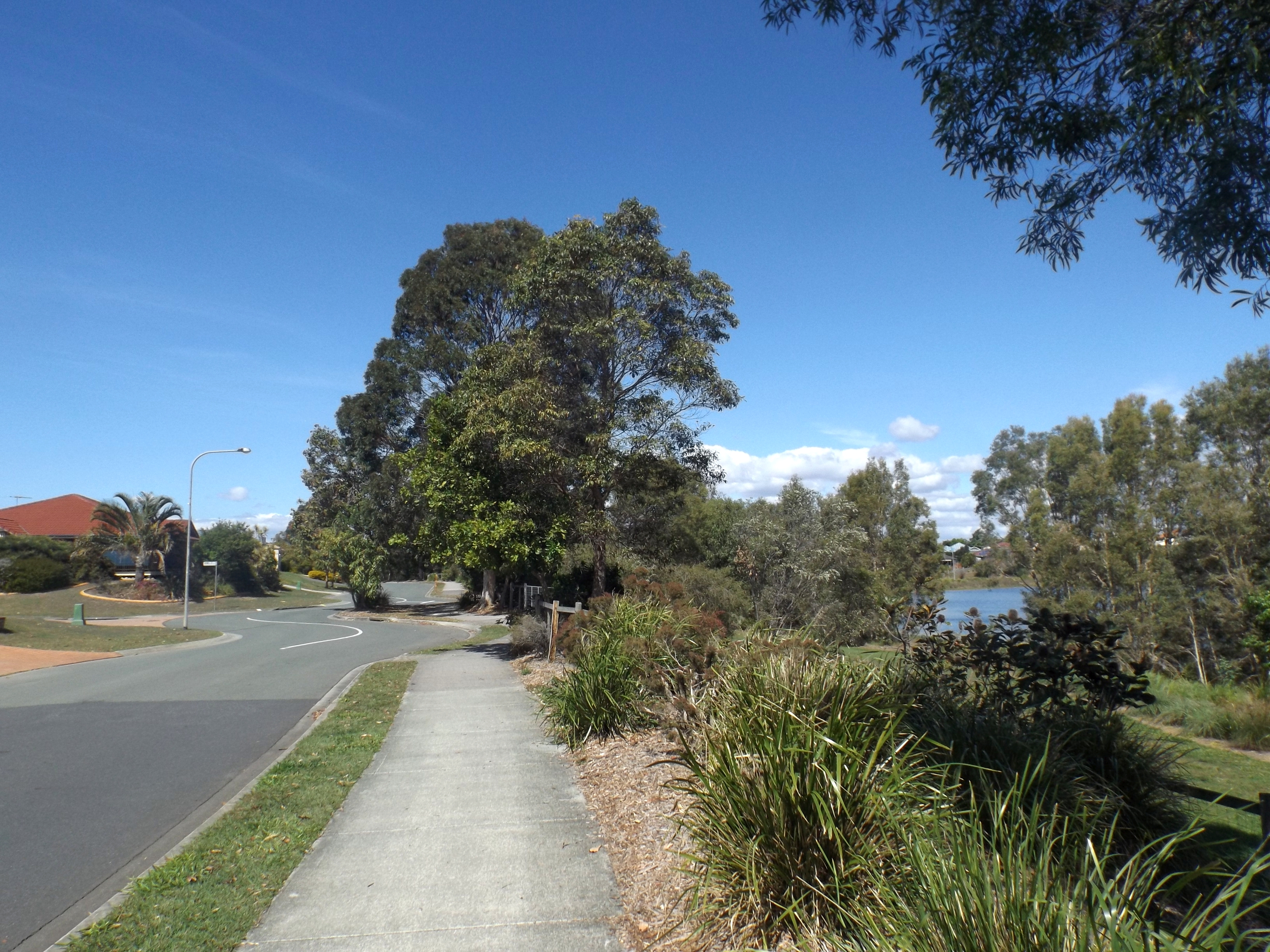
- Topaz Drive, 2016

- Interactive map of Mango Hill
- Coordinates: 27.2411°S 153.0475°E
- Country: Australia
- State: Queensland
- City: Moreton Bay
- LGA: City of Moreton Bay
- Location: 10.8 km (6.7 mi) NW of Strathpine; 11.7 km (7.3 mi) W of Redcliffe; 28.4 km (17.6 mi) N of Brisbane CBD

Government
  - State electorates: Murrumba; Bancroft
  - Federal division: Petrie

Area
  - Total: 14.2 km^{2} (5.5 sq mi)

Population
  - Total: 14,921 (2021 census)
  - Density: 1,051/km^{2} (2,721/sq mi)
- Time zone: UTC+10:00 (AEST)
- Postcode: 4509
Suburbs around Mango Hill
North Lakes	Rothwell	Rothwell
Kallangur	Mango Hill	Clontarf
Murrumba Downs	Griffin	Moreton Bay

Mango Hill is a suburb in the City of Moreton Bay, Queensland, Australia. In the 2021 census, Mango Hill had a population of 14,921 people.

== History ==
Although locally known by this name since the 1950s, it wasn't until 1 September 1980 that it was formally decreed. The name Mango Hill was chosen to commemorate the section of Mango trees (Magnifera indica) that were planted along the 700 m (2,300 ft) section of Anzac Avenue that passes through the area.

In March 2006, the Department of Natural Resources, Mines and Water subdivided the northern section of Mango Hill to form the suburb of North Lakes.

Although now separated, the area still reaps the benefits of the major infrastructure and retail upgrades that have taken place in North Lakes in recent years, including the Redcliffe Peninsula railway line and shopping outlets such as Costco and IKEA. This has resulted in a significant boost to economic growth in the City of Moreton Bay.

North Lakes State College opened on 1 January 2002. This school is now within North Lakes.

The Lakes College opened on 24 January 2005. This school is now within North Lakes.

St Benedict's Catholic Primary School opened in 2008.

Mango Hill State School opened on 1 January 2012.

St Benedict's Catholic College opened in February 2013.

In October 2018, Kidz Magic opened its third early learning centre, accommodating up to 131 children aged 6 weeks to 5 years.

Mango Hill State Secondary College opened on 1 January 2020. It officially opened on 26 August 2020.

Mango Hill Early Learning and Childcare opened in July 2021 for children aged six weeks to six years, with a capacity of 86 children.

== Demographics ==
In the 2011 census, Mango Hill recorded a population of 4,340 people, 51.6% female and 48.4% male. The median age of the Mango Hill population was 33 years, 4 years below the national median of 37. 69.7% of people living in Mango Hill were born in Australia. The other top responses for country of birth were England 8.3%, New Zealand 6.4%, South Africa 2.3%, Scotland 1.1%, Philippines 0.8%. 89.5% of people spoke only English at home; the next most common languages were 0.8% Afrikaans, 0.6% Hindi, 0.6% Samoan, 0.6% Spanish, 0.5% Mandarin.

In the 2016 census, Mango Hill had a population of 8,434 people.

In the 2021 census, Mango Hill had a population of 14,921 people.

== Heritage listing ==
On 5 February 2009, Anzac Avenue (the road itself) was awarded heritage listed status. The memorial site is a tribute to soldiers lost in World War I and has been in various stages of development since 1925. The section of Anzac Avenue (between the Bruce Highway and Kinsellas Road) that passes through Mango Hill has 700 m (2,300 ft) of mango trees (Magnifera indica) as part of a commemorative tree planting. The suburb takes its name from the trees.

== Education ==
Mango Hill State School is a government primary (Prep–6) school for boys and girls at Bonnet Parade (27.2430°S 153.0334°E). In 2023, the school had an enrolment of 1,605 students with 111 teachers (100 full-time equivalent) and 59 non-teaching staff (42 full-time equivalent). It includes a special education program.

Mango Hill State Secondary College is a government secondary (7–12) school for boys and girls in Richard Road (27.2405°S 153.0444°E). In 2023, the school had an enrolment of 788 students with 65 teachers (63 full-time equivalent) and 39 non-teaching staff (29 full-time equivalent). In 2024, the first cohort of Year 12 students started their final year of schooling.

St Benedict's Catholic Primary School is a Catholic primary (Prep–6) school for boys and girls at 22 St Benedict's Close (27.2324°S 153.0339°E). In 2023, the school had an enrolment of 754 students with 49 teachers (41 full-time equivalent) and 32 non-teaching staff (19 full-time equivalent).

St Benedict's College is a Catholic secondary (7–12) school for boys and girls at 21 St Benedict's Close (27.2325°S 153.0341°E). In 2023, the school had an enrolment of 1,011 students with 73 teachers (73 full-time equivalent) and 46 non-teaching staff (35 full-time equivalent).

== Community groups ==
The Mango Hill Group of the Queensland Country Women's Association meets at Danzy Buchanan Park on Chermside Road.

The Mango Hill Progress Association was founded in 1986 and manages operations of the Mango Hill Community Centre at Danzy Buchanan Park and the adjacent Kubler tennis courts on behalf of the City of Moreton Bay council. The association advocates for local residents on various community issues in addition to hosting community activities including annual Christmas carols and regular skate nights.

== Transport ==
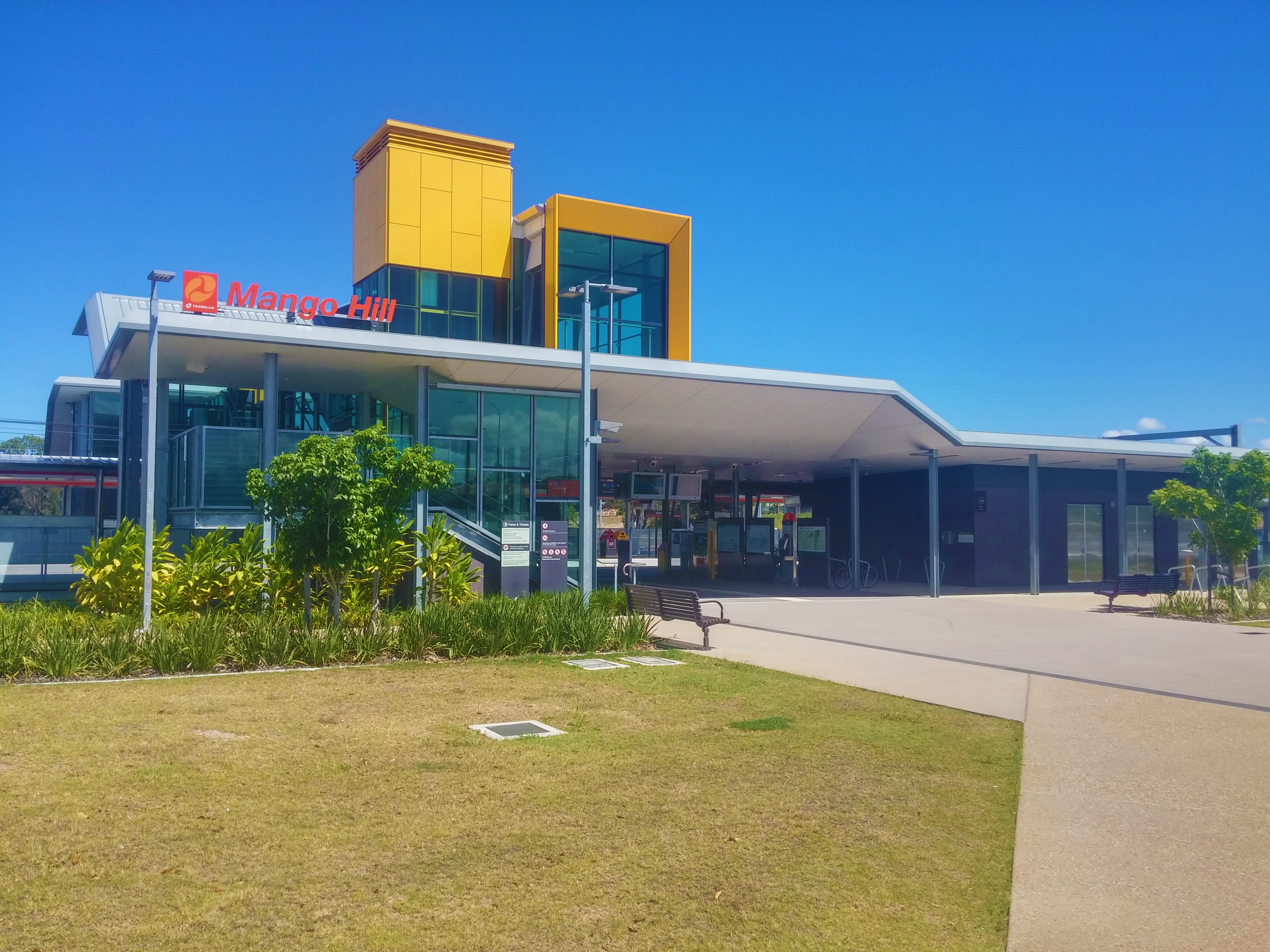
Mango Hill railway station, 2017

Mango Hill railway station and Mango Hill East railway station opened on 4 October 2016.

The 681 and 682 local loop bus service provides transport throughout the suburb connecting it to train services at Mango Hill railway station. The 687 service runs from Mango Hill railway station to the nearby suburb of North Lakes conducting a loop in North Lakes. The 680 bus also travels along Anzac Avenue providing connections to Redcliffe and Chermside via Petrie and Strathpine.
