= Rothwell, Queensland =

Suburb of City of Moreton Bay, Australia

Rothwell
- Suburb
- Interactive map of Rothwell
- Coordinates: 27.2144°S 153.0527°E
- Country: Australia
- State: Queensland
- Region: South East Queensland
- LGA: City of Moreton Bay
- Location: 7.1 km (4.4 mi) W of Redcliffe; 32.7 km (20.3 mi) N of Brisbane CBD

Government
  - State electorates: Bancroft; Murrumba
  - Federal division: Petrie

Area
  - Total: 10.1 km^{2} (3.9 sq mi)

Population
  - Total: 7,538 (2021 census)
  - Density: 746/km^{2} (1,933/sq mi)
- Time zone: UTC+10:00 (AEST)
- Postcode: 4022
Suburbs around Rothwell
Deception Bay	Deception Bay	Newport
North Lakes	Rothwell	Kippa-Ring
Mango Hill	Mango Hill	Clontarf

Rothwell is a coastal suburb in the City of Moreton Bay, Queensland, Australia. In the 2021 census, Rothwell had a population of 7,538 people.

== Geography ==
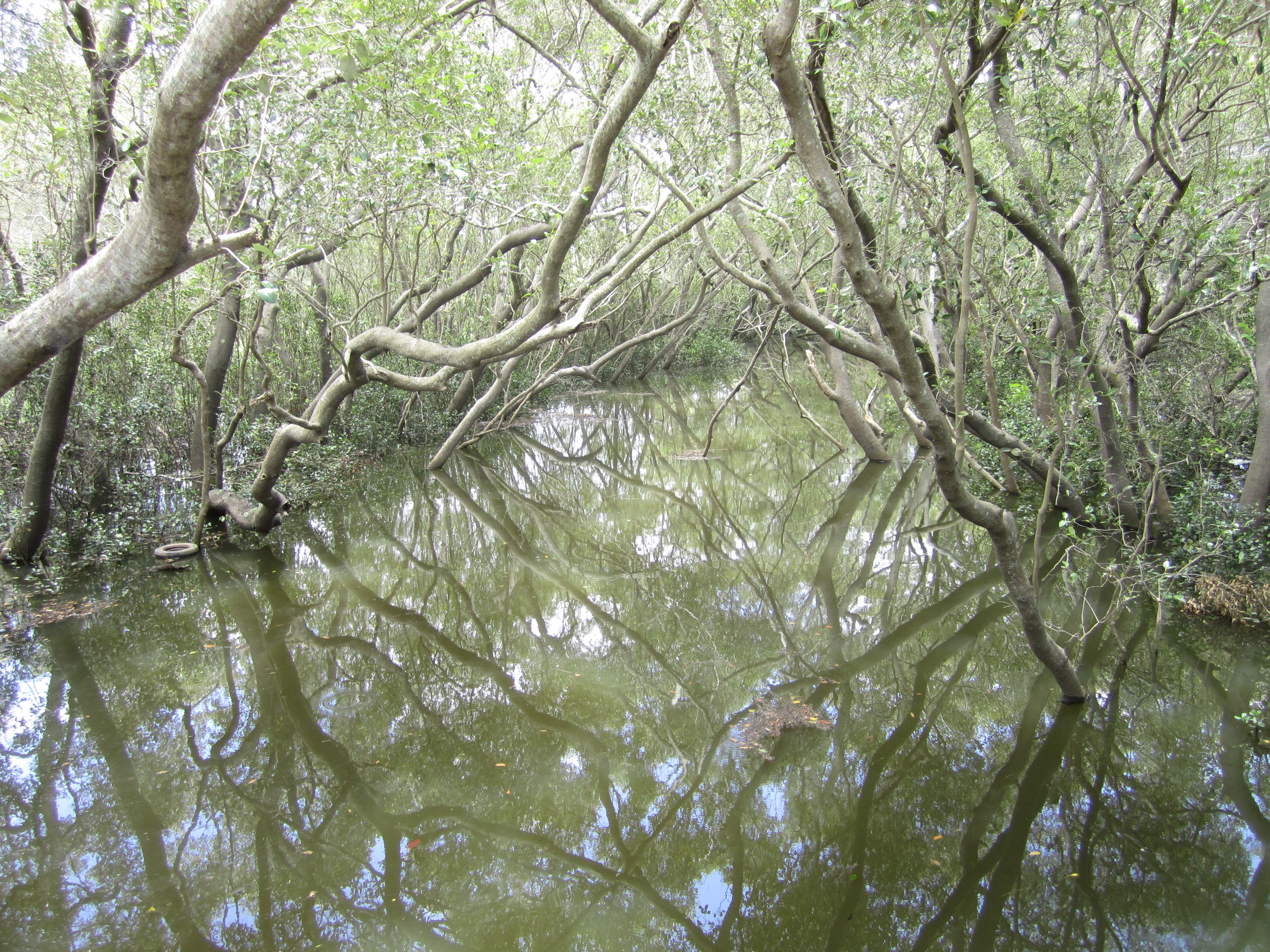
Saltwater Creek, 2012

Rothwell is in the west of the Redcliffe Peninsula, approximately 28 kilometres (17 mi) north-northeast of Brisbane, the state capital of Queensland.

The suburb is bounded to the north by the bay of Deception Bay (part of Moreton Bay), to the east in part by Nathan Road, and to the south and south-west by Saltwater Creek.

Anzac Avenue enters the suburb from the east (Kippa-Ring) and proceeds west, where at a large intersection (27.2152°S 153.0475°E) Anzac Avenue continues to the south-west exiting to Mango Hill, while Deception Bay Road heads north-west exiting to the suburb of Deception Bay.

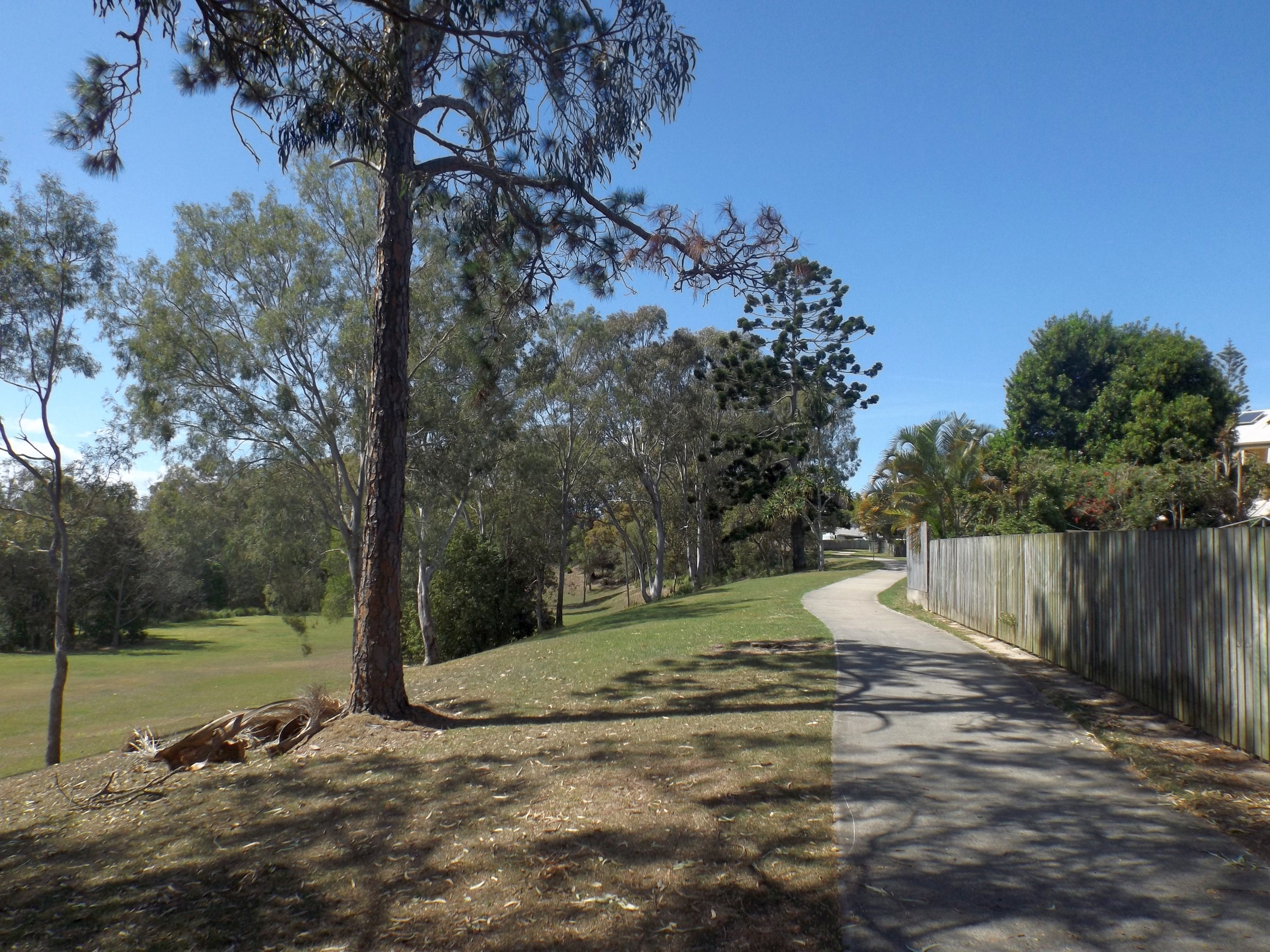
Moreton Bay Cycleway, 2016

The Redcliffe Peninsula railway line enters the suburb from the east (Kippa-Ring) and exits to the south (Mango Hill), connecting to the North Coast railway line at Petrie. The suburb is serviced by the Rothwell railway station (27.2238°S 153.0484°E). The 12.6-kilometre (7.8 mi) Moreton Bay Railway Cyclepath runs immediately parallel to the railway line; it is to the north of the line in Rothwell.

Redcliffe Aerodrome is in the north-east of the suburb (27.2064°S 153.0733°E). It is owned and operated by Moreton Bay City Council.

Rothwell is one of the few areas on the Redcliffe Peninsula prone to flooding due to Saltwater Creek; areas in the southern part of the suburb near the creek are undeveloped. Rothwell Park (27.2158°S 153.0430°E) along McGahey Street experiences flooding and the relocation of the sports grounds at the park has been proposed for several years.

The undeveloped Nathan Road Wetlands Reserve (27.1970°S 153.0513°E) occupies the north of the suburb (apart from the Redcliffe Aerodrome). Although Rothwell is a bayside suburb, there are no roads or tracks through the wetlands to provide access to the bay.

== History ==
In 1888 and 1889 (when the area was known as Deception Bay), there was a long-running attempt to sell a subdivision known as the Isle of Man estate (27.2180°S 153.0382°E), bounded to the east, south and west by Saltwater Creek (called Fresh Water Creek in the advertising material). The land was promoted as being near the proposed Redcliffe railway line. However, the lots were either never sold or never developed. Although the subdivision can be seen on cadastral maps until at least 1978, at 2020 the land has returned to a single undivided and undeveloped parcel. This may relate to the flood-prone nature of Saltwater Creek.

The suburb's name is after the president of the Royal Automobile Club of Queensland, Thomas James Rothwell, who in 1921 proposed a memorial drive marked by an avenue of trees to Redcliffe via the upgraded main road known as Anzac Avenue). Rothwell died on 28 January 1928 and his involvement with the Avenue was honoured on Sunday 9 April 1933 with the unveiling of the Rothwell monument by the Queensland Governor, Sir Leslie Wilson. This stone obelisk was placed on a small triangular piece of land at the intersection of Anzac Memorial Avenue and the Deception Bay Road, later moving to nearby Rothwell Park (27.2173°S 153.0451°E) when a roundabout was built on the original site.

Rothwell was officially named as a suburb by the Queensland Place Names Board on 1 July 1970.

Grace Lutheran College opened on 31 January 1978 with 15 students under teacher Viv Kuhl at Grace Lutheran Primary School at Clontarf. In 1980 it moved to its present site in Rothwell.

Mueller College was established on 30 January 1990 by the Mueller Community Church.

In 2015, the Moreton Bay Regional Council began a $18.8 million project to create the Nathan Road Sports Ground (27.2138°S 153.0731°E) in Kippa-Ring to replace the AFL facility at flood-prone Rothwell Park. It is expected to be completed in 2020.

== Demographics ==
In the 2011 census, Rothwell had a population of 6,683 people, 52.8% female and 47.2% male. The median age of the Rothwell population was 36 years, 1 year below the national median of 37. 73.5% of people living in Rothwell were born in Australia. The other top responses for country of birth were New Zealand 5.8%, England 5.4%, South Africa 0.9%, Philippines 0.9%, Samoa 0.8%. 87.7% of people spoke only English at home; the next most common languages were 1.7% Samoan, 0.4% Afrikaans, 0.4% Hindi, 0.4% Vietnamese, 0.3% Dutch.

In the 2016 census, Rothwell had a population of 7,165 people.

In the 2021 census, Rothwell had a population of 7,538 people.

== Heritage listings ==
Rothwell has the following heritage-listed sites:

- Anzac Avenue (the road itself)

== Education ==
Grace Lutheran College is a private secondary (7–12) school for boys and girls at Anzac Avenue & Mewes Road (27.2182°S 153.0567°E). In 2017, the school had an enrolment of 1,361 students with 111 teachers (102 full-time equivalent) and 124 non-teaching staff (84 full-time equivalent).

Mueller College is a private primary and secondary (Prep–12) school for boys and girls at 75 Morris Road (27.2126°S 153.0612°E). In 2017, the school had an enrolment of 1,451 students with 122 teachers (112 full-time equivalent) and 96 non-teaching staff (64 full-time equivalent).

There are no government schools in Rothwell. The nearest government primary schools are Hercules Road State School in Kippa-Ring to the east and Deception Bay State School in Deception Bay to the north-west. The nearest government secondary school is Deception Bay State High School in Deception Bay.

== Amenities ==
Rothwell is a residential area with a growing commercial district, home to The Zone and a mixture of diverse retail businesses. A Woolworths supermarket is near The Zone on Deception Bay Road. A Bunnings Warehouse is on Anzac Avenue. Currently, the larger shopping centres and supermarkets are in nearby Kippa-Ring and Deception Bay.

== Sport ==
Currently, sporting clubs in Rothwell are the Redcliffe Cougars softball club and the Redcliffe Tigers AFC.

== See also ==
Redcliffe Peninsula road network
