= Kippa-Ring railway station =

Railway station in Queensland, Australia

Kippa-Ring
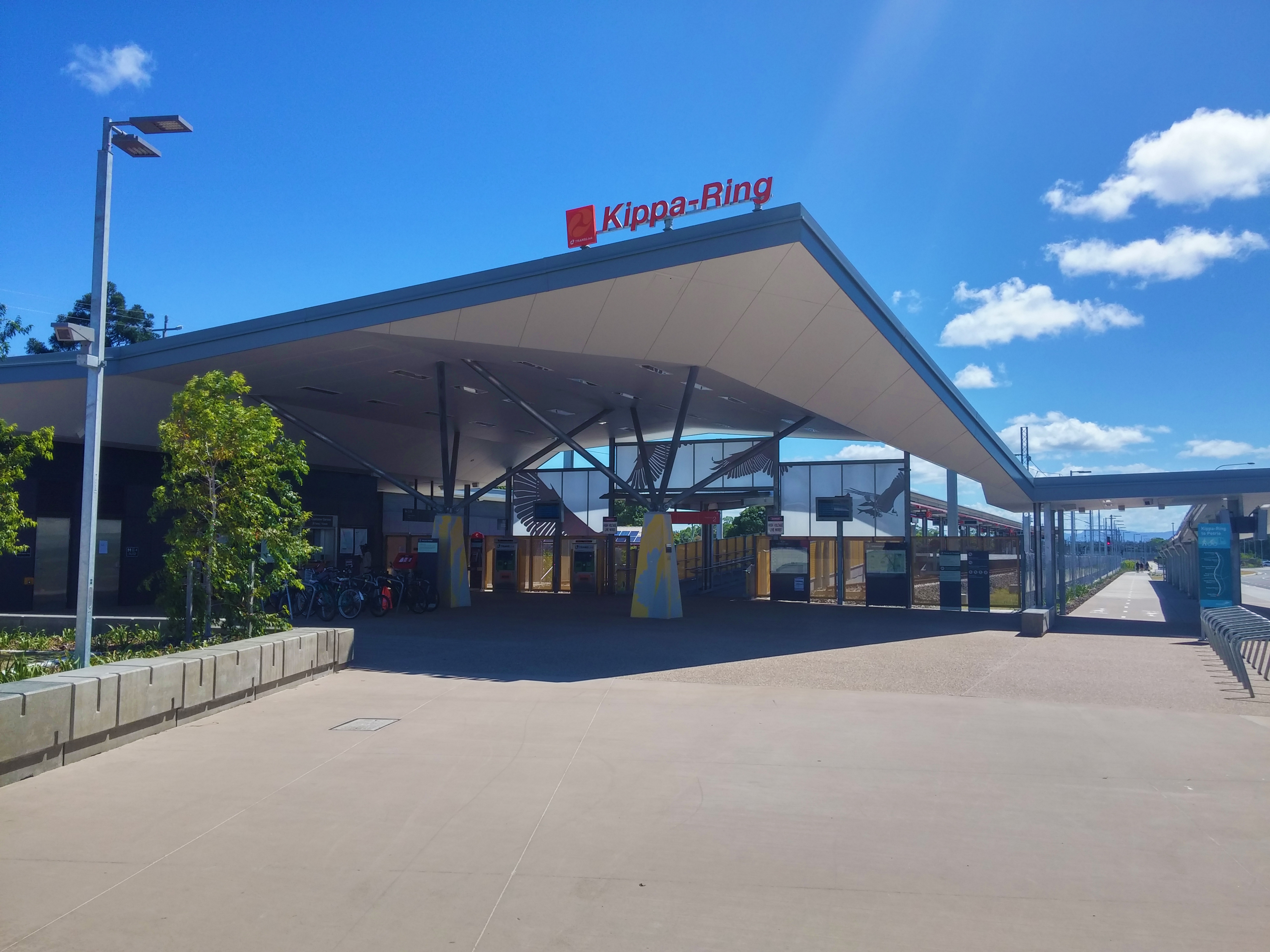
- Station entrance in January 2017

General information
- Location: Lion's Crescent, Kippa-Ring
- Coordinates: 27.2253°S 153.0826°E
- Owner: Queensland Rail
- Operator: Queensland Rail
- Line: Redcliffe Peninsula
- Distance: 40.10 kilometres from Central
- Platforms: 2 (1 island)

Construction
- Structure type: Ground
- Parking: 400 spaces
- Accessible: Yes

Other information
- Station code: 600633 (platform 1); 600634 (platform 2)
- Fare zone: Zone 3

History
- Opened: 4 October 2016; 9 years ago

Services
| Preceding station | Queensland Rail | Following station |
|---|---|---|
| Rothwell towards Springfield Central via Roma Street | Redcliffe Peninsula line | Terminus |
Location

Kippa-Ring is a railway station operated by Queensland Rail, which serves as the terminus of the Redcliffe Peninsula line. It opened in 2016 and serves the Moreton Bay suburb of Kippa-Ring. It is a ground level station, featuring one island platform with two faces.

Following an upgrade of Kippa-Ring railway station's car park, the station now has 408 parking spaces, consisting of 396 regular parking spaces, two new family parking spaces, and ten disability parking spaces, eight are located near the grassed area at the entrance to the station, with two of the originally installed spaces still available.

== Services ==
Kippa-Ring is served by trains operating to Roma Street and Springfield Central. Some afternoon weekday services continue to Ipswich.

== Services by platform ==
Kippa-Ring platform arrangement
| Platform | Line | Destinations | Notes |
|---|---|---|---|
| 1 | Redcliffe Peninsula | Roma Street, Springfield Central & Ipswich | |
| 2 | Redcliffe Peninsula | Roma Street, Springfield Central & Ipswich | |

== Bus routes by stop ==
| Stop | Route number | Destination | Locations/Roads Serving |
|---|---|---|---|
| Stop A | 660 (northbound) | Caboolture station | Rothwell, Deception Bay, Burpengary, Morayfield |
| Stop A | 660 (southbound) | Redcliffe | Anzac Avenue |
| Stop A | 680 (inbound) | Chermside | Rothwell, North Lakes bus station, Kallangur, Petrie station, Lawnton, Strathpine, Bald Hills, Carseldine, Aspley |
| Stop A | 680 (outbound) | Redcliffe | Anzac Avenue |
| Stop A | 690 (inbound) | Sandgate station | Scarborough, Redcliffe, Oxley Avenue, Hornibrook Esp, Brighton |
| Stop A | 690 (outbound) | Clontarf (Duffield Road) | Elizabeth Avenue |
| Stop A | 694 (drop-off only) | from Redcliffe | Oxley Avenue, Hornibrook Esp, Clontarf, Kippa-Ring |
| Stop A | 696 (clockwise loop) (drop-off only) | from Redcliffe | Woody Point, Redcliffe Waterfront, Boardman Road |
| Stop A | 696 (anti-clockwise loop) (drop-off only) | from Redcliffe | Boardman Road, Redcliffe Waterfront, Woody Point |
| Stop A | 698 (drop-off only) | from Rothwell station | Morris Road |
| Stop A | 699 (drop-off only) | from Redcliffe | Scarborough, Newport |
| Stop B | 694 | Redcliffe | Kippa-Ring, Clontarf, Oxley Avenue, Hornibrook Esp |
| Stop B | 696 (clockwise loop) | Redcliffe | Boardman Road, Redcliffe Waterfront, Woody Point |
| Stop B | 696 (anti-clockwise loop) | Redcliffe | Woody Point, Redcliffe Waterfront, Boardman Road |
| Stop B | 698 | Rothwell station | Morris Road |
| Stop B | 699 | Redcliffe | Newport, Scarborough |

== Transport links ==
Hornibrook Bus Lines operate six routes via Kippa-Ring station:

- 680: Redcliffe to Chermside bus station
- 690: Redcliffe to Sandgate
- 694: to Redcliffe via Clontarf
- 696: to Redcliffe via Woody Point
- 698: to Rothwell station
- 699: to Redcliffe via Scarborough

Kangaroo Bus Lines operates one route to and from Kippa-Ring station:

- 660: to Caboolture station
