= North Lakes, Queensland =

North Lakes
- Suburb
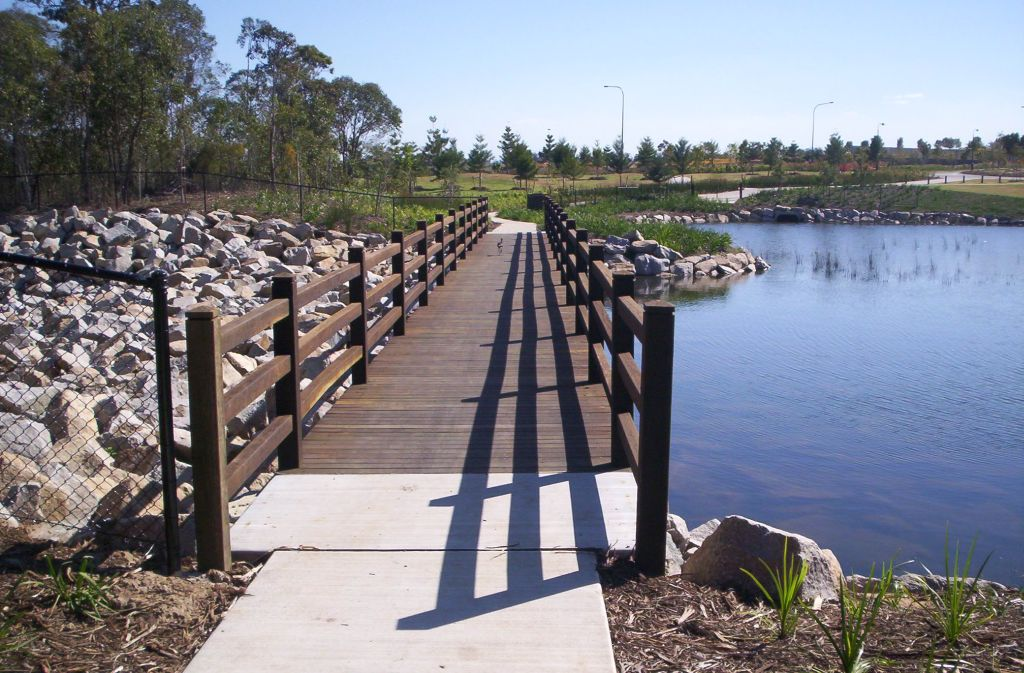

- Interactive map of North Lakes
- Coordinates: 27.2244°S 153.0138°E
- Country: Australia
- State: Queensland
- City: Moreton Bay
- LGA: City of Moreton Bay
- Location: 12.6 km (7.8 mi) N of Strathpine; 34.1 km (21.2 mi) N of Brisbane CBD

Government
  - State electorate: Bancroft
  - Federal division: Petrie

Area
  - Total: 11.6 km^{2} (4.5 sq mi)

Population
  - Total: 23,030 (2021 census)
  - Density: 1,985/km^{2} (5,142/sq mi)
- Time zone: UTC+10:00 (AEST)
- Postcode: 4509
Suburbs around North Lakes
| Narangba | Deception Bay | Rothwell |
| Dakabin | North Lakes | Mango Hill |
| Kallangur | Kallangur | Mango Hill |

North Lakes is a suburb in the City of Moreton Bay, Queensland, Australia. In the 2021 census, North Lakes had a population of 23,030 people.

== Geography ==
Lake Eden is within the suburb of North Lakes.

Plantation Road Bridge is a 95-metre (312 ft) road bridge over the Bruce Highway to linking North Lakes to Dakabin along Plantation Road.

== History ==
North Lakes is situated in the Yugarabul traditional Indigenous Australian country.

In 1891, the Kinsellas brothers secured land for breeding and training police horses. By 1928 their 405 hectares of land was used for dairy farming as the Allesnik Dairy Farm. At the time, Norman Meyers owned a pineapple plantation that remained there until the 1960s. The land at time was very competitive. Following the construction of the Australian Paper Manufacturers Mill at Petrie, slash pine plantations extended through North Lakes from the 1970s, and finally wound down operations in the 2000s.

=== Development ===
The exotic slash pine plantations—largely considered unsuccessful—were last harvested in 1994-5. Afterwards, the former plantation sat as a paddock, freeing land for commercial developers. In 1995, developer Lends Lease Development Pty Ltd first announced the construction of a master-planned community in the Mango Hill area. The North Lakes project officially commenced on a 1,000-hectare site, led by developers Lend Lease and Lensworth Group Ltd in a joint-venture in April 1999. On 15 September 1999, an agreement was signed between CSIRO and the two developers for the construction of the suburb using sustainable and eco-friendly methods. This would include the usage of solar passive houses that were orientated to the sun to reduce energy. The entire development projected the construction of 8,500 residential houses, a town centre, business park, and support community services built over a 20 year period. It had a planned population of 25,000 people.

In December 2004, Stockland acquired Lensworth with a cost of $825 million and working capital cost of $21 million. Afterwards, the group further developed North Lakes, which had a remaining net developable area of 450 hectares at the time. This would nave yielded approximately 4,200 housing lots.

North Lakes State College opened on 1 January 2002.

The Lakes College opened on 24 January 2005.

Originally part of Mango Hill, North Lakes was gazetted as a separate suburb by the Department of Natural Resources, Mines and Water in February 2006. The origin of the suburb name is from the name given to the estate development.

Bounty Boulevard State School was opened on 1 January 2009.

In 2010, North Lakes won the UDIA Queensland Awards for Excellence's Masterplanned Development. The suburb won the same award in 2016, and later won the Property Council of Australia's Best Master Planned Community award in 2017, which met positive reception from Stockland.

The North Lakes Library opened in 2014.

Plantation Road Bridge over the Bruce Highway linking North Lakes to Dakabin along Plantation Road opened on 12 December 2014.

The North Lakes Golf Club closed on 11 August 2019 with the land to be sold for a retirement village. Residents were upset by the decision as they chose to live in the area because of the green space of the golf course.

== Demographics ==
In the 2011 census, North Lakes had a population of 15,046 people, 51.6% female and 48.4% male. The median age of the North Lakes population was 31 years, 6 years below the national median of 37. 63% of people living in North Lakes were born in Australia. The other top responses for country of birth were England 9.2%, New Zealand 8.7%, South Africa 3.9%, Philippines 1.3%, Scotland 1%. 86.6% of people spoke only English at home; the next most common languages were 1.5% Afrikaans, 0.8% Hindi, 0.7% Tagalog, 0.7% Spanish, 0.5% German.

In the 2016 census, North Lakes had a population of 21,671 people. North Lakes includes the largest South African Australian community of any suburb in Queensland, numbering 809 individuals and making up 3.7% of the suburb's population.

In the 2021 census, North Lakes had a population of 23,030 people.

== Heritage listing ==
- Anzac Avenue (the road itself)

== Education ==
Bounty Boulevard State School is a government primary (Prep-6) school for boys and girls at 195 Bounty Boulevard (27.2156°S 153.0080°E). In 2018, the school had an enrolment of 1,424 students with 94 teachers (86 full-time equivalent) and 50 non-teaching staff (31 full-time equivalent).

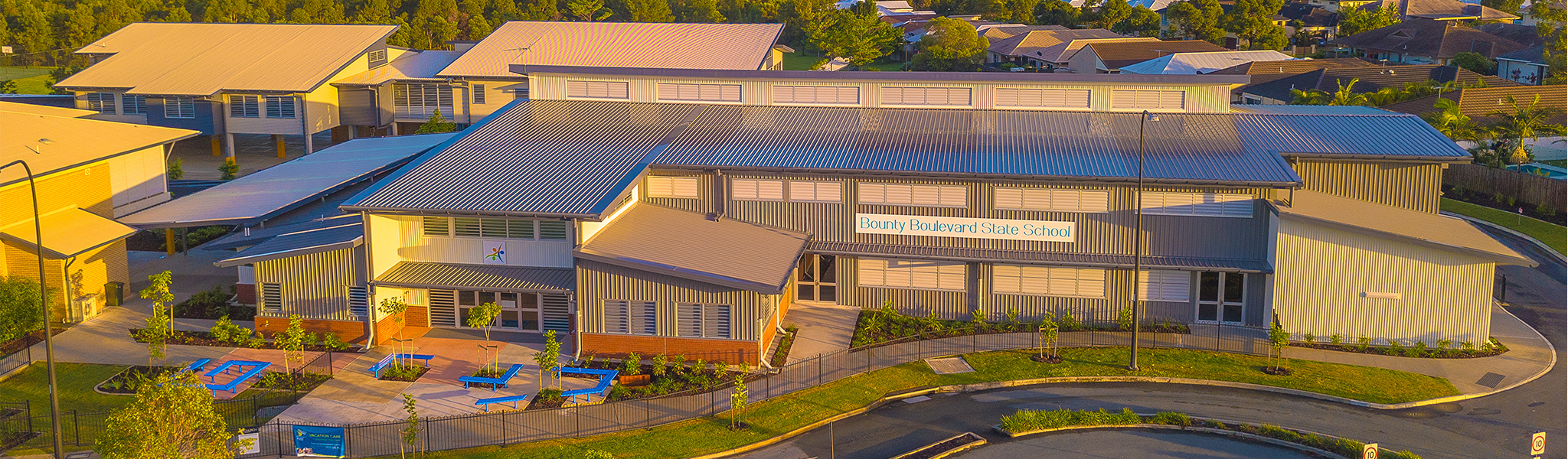
Bounty Boulevard State School, circa 2021

North Lakes State College is a government primary and secondary (Prep-12) school for boys and girls on Joyner Circuit (27.2383°S 153.0251°E). In 2018, the school had an enrolment of 2,947 students with 227 teachers (206 full-time equivalent) and 82 non-teaching staff (61 full-time equivalent).

The Lakes College is a private primary and secondary (Prep-12) school. In 2018, the school had an enrolment of 833 students with 66 teachers (63 full-time equivalent) and 43 non-teaching staff (38 full-time equivalent).

Y Schools Queensland - Moreton Bay is a private secondary (9-12) campus of Y Schools Queensland (formerly YMCA Vocational School with headquarters at Kingston) on the corner of Endeavour Boulevard and Lakefield Drive (27.2380°S 153.0158°E). The school provides alternative education for students needing extra support.

== Transport ==
The only mode of public transport in North Lakes is bus with all services traveling ether via or to/from North Lakes Bus Station.
