= Kallangur, Queensland =

Kallangur
- Suburb
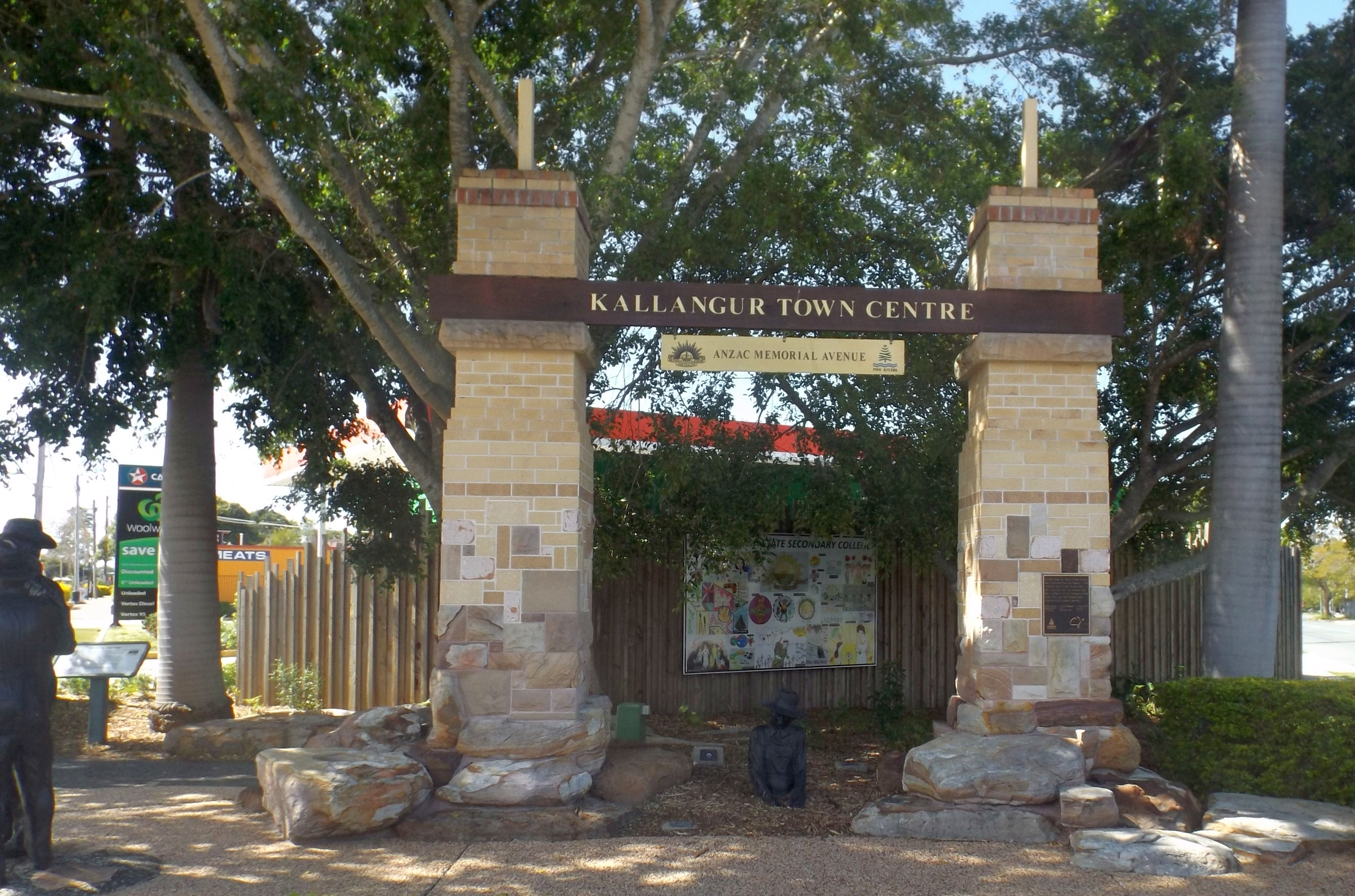
- Anzac Avenue, 2016

- Interactive map of Kallangur
- Coordinates: 27.2502°S 152.9963°E
- Country: Australia
- State: Queensland
- City: Moreton Bay
- LGA: City of Moreton Bay
- Location: 6.9 km (4.3 mi) N of Strathpine; 14.0 km (8.7 mi) WSW of Redcliffe; 27.3 km (17.0 mi) N of Brisbane CBD

Government
  - State electorates: Murrumba; Kurwongbah
  - Federal divisions: Longman; Dickson

Area
  - Total: 11.3 km^{2} (4.4 sq mi)

Population
  - Total: 21,761 (2021 census)
  - Density: 1,926/km^{2} (4,988/sq mi)
- Time zone: UTC+10:00 (AEST)
- Postcode: 4503
Suburbs around Kallangur
Kurwongbah	Dakabin	North Lakes
Kurwongbah	Kallangur	North Lakes
Petrie	Murrumba Downs	Griffin

Kallangur (/kəˈlæŋɡər/ kə-LANG-gər) is a suburb in the City of Moreton Bay, Queensland, Australia. In the 2021 census, Kallangur had a population of 21,761 people.

== Geography ==
The North Coast railway line forms the western boundary of the suburb, while the Bruce Highway forms the eastern boundary. The main thoroughfare in Kallangur is route 71, Anzac Avenue (27.2499°S 152.9966°E).

The Redcliffe Peninsula railway line passes through the suburb, which is served by the Kallangur railway station (27.2566°S 153.0003°E).

The proposed Bruce Highway Western Alternative will have its southern entry point in Kallangur.

== History ==
The area once belonged to Mrs. Griffin of Whiteside west of Petrie, and was acquired by the son of a Scottish migrant by the name of Thomas Petrie in 1855. The name Kallangur originates from the Indigenous Australian word kalangoor, meaning a goodly or satisfactory place. Kallangur is situated in the Yugarabul traditional Indigenous Australian country of the Brisbane and surrounding regions, however, the word kalangoor is from the Kabi dialect, from the traditional Indigenous Australian Gubbi Gubbi (Kabi) country of the Sunshine Coast and surrounding regions.

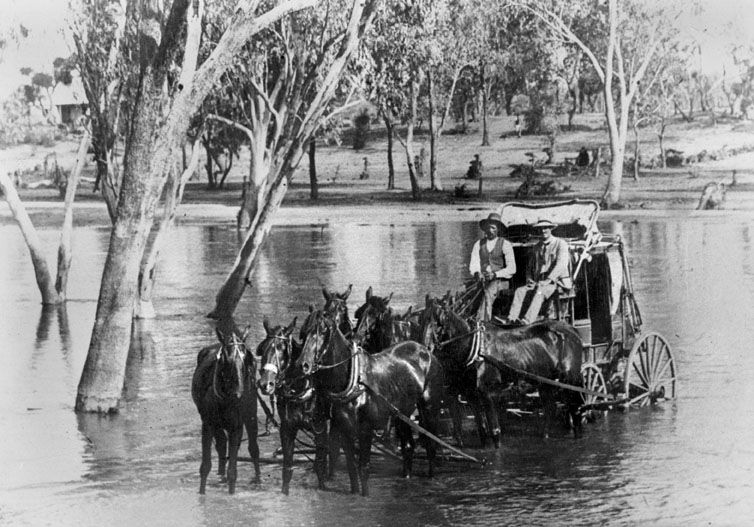
Cobb and Co coach, Old Gympie Road, Kallangur

Gympie Road (now Old Gympie Road) passed through Kallangur from Brisbane to Gympie. It was a route travelled by Cobb & Co coaches.

Kallangur grew in the early twentieth century as it was on the main road route to the Redcliffe peninsula before the construction of the Hornibrook Bridge in the 1930s.

Kallangur State School opened on 9 June 1930.

More recent development has been in response to the general housing demand in the northern growth corridor.

Space City was built on Anzac Avenue in 1978 before being demolished in 1985.

Dakabin State School opened on 28 January 1992.

St Peter's Anglican church was closed on 7 March 1993 under the authority of Assistant Bishop Wood.

An ANZAC memorial gate was erected along with a bronze statue on the corner of Anzac Avenue and Goodfellows Road. The new Memorial Gardens was unveiled in front of the North's Leagues and Services Club in 2005 by the former Minister for Veterans' Affairs De-Anne Kelly.

Kallangur railway station was completed in 2016.

Charlotte Mason College was a private primary and secondary (Prep–10) school for boys and girls at 30 Narangba Road (27.2507°S 152.9788°E). It opened in 2017. In 2018, the school had an enrolment of 214 students with 9 teachers (7 full-time equivalent) and 7 non-teaching staff. The school also operated a distance education program. In December 2023, the school suddenly closed following a series of financial audits.

Pinnacle Academic College opened in July 2020.

== Demographics ==
In the 2011 census, Kallangur recorded a population of 18,982 people, 51.1% female and 48.9% male. The median age of the Kallangur population was 33 years, 4 years below the national median of 37. 77.9% of people living in Kallangur were born in Australia. The other top responses for country of birth were New Zealand 5.9%, England 4%, Philippines 0.7%, South Africa 0.7%, Scotland 0.5%. 90.9% of people spoke only English at home; the next most common languages were 0.6% Samoan, 0.4% Hindi, 0.4% Spanish, 0.3% Tagalog, 0.3% German.

In the 2016 census, Kallangur had a population of 20,405 people.

In the 2021 census, Kallangur had a population of 21,761 people.

== Heritage listings ==
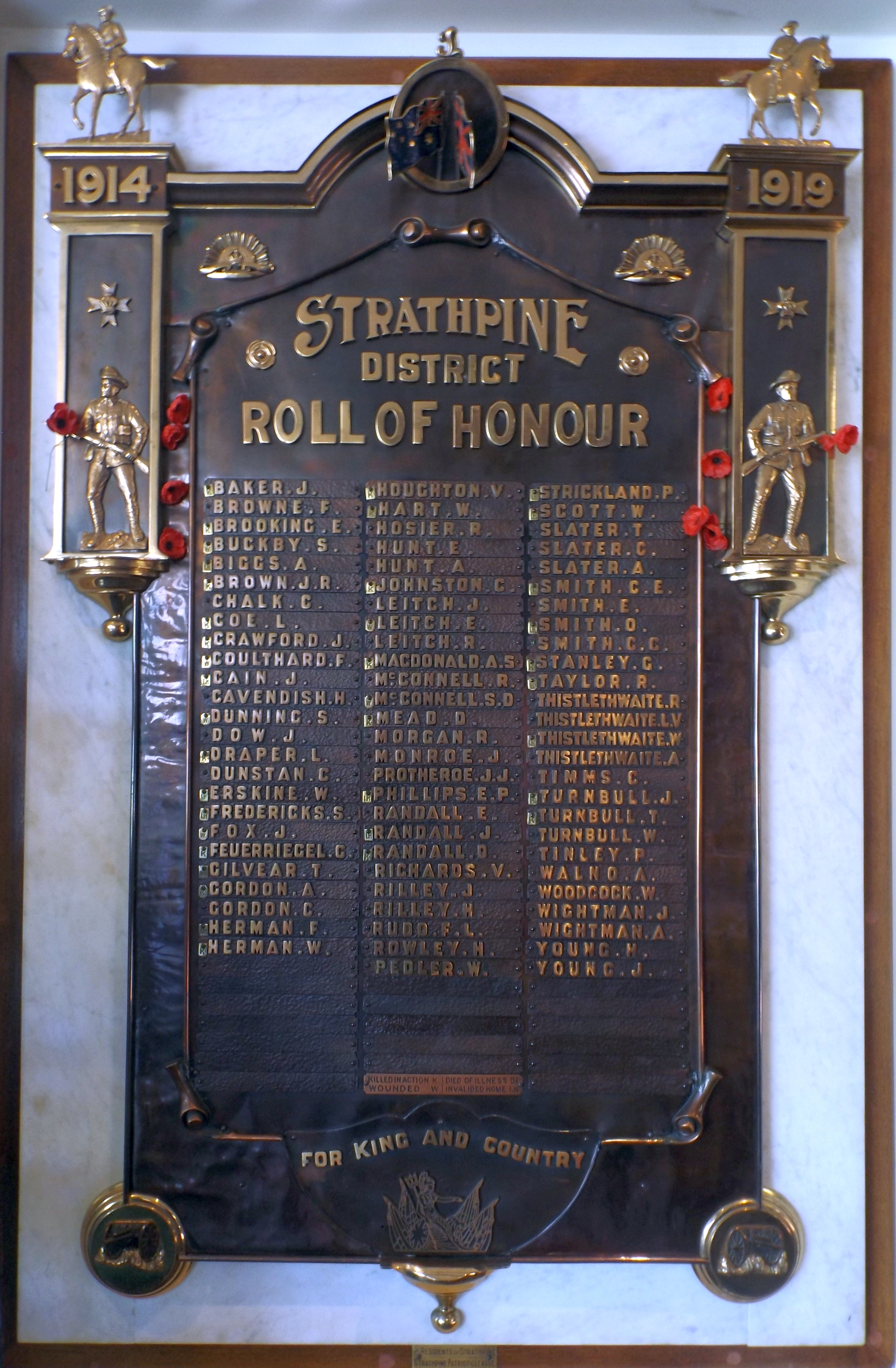
Strathpine Honour Board, 2016

Kallangur has a number of heritage-listed sites, including:

- Anzac Avenue (the road itself)
- Strathpine Honour Board, 1347 Anzac Avenue (27.2527°S 152.9882°E)

== Education ==
Kallangur State School is a government primary (Prep–6) school for boys and girls at 139 School Road (27.2487°S 152.9928°E). In 2018, the school had an enrolment of 810 students with 55 teachers (50 full-time equivalent) and 39 non-teaching staff (27 full-time equivalent). It includes a special education program.

Despite its name, Dakabin State School is a government primary (Prep–6) school for boys and girls at Sheaves Road in Kallangur (27.2378°S 152.9867°E). In 2018, the school had an enrolment of 600 students with 45 teachers (39 full-time equivalent) and 34 non-teaching staff (21 full-time equivalent). It includes a special education program. It also includes the POWER Positive Learning Centre, a specific-purpose primary (3–7) program for children whose behaviours are incompatible with mainstream schooling; the aim of the centre is to ultimately re-integrate the child back into mainstream schooling.

Pinnacle Academic College is a private primary school (Prep–6) for boys and girls at 30 Narangba Road (27.2507°S 152.9788°E), a site shared with the former Charlotte Mason College. Pinaccle Academic College offers individualised self-directed education.

There is no government secondary school in Kallangur. The nearest government secondary schools are Dakabin State High School in neighbouring Dakabin to the north and Murrumba State Secondary College in neighbouring Murrumba Downs to the south.

== Amenities ==
The Kallangur branch of the Queensland Country Women's Association meets at 1431 Anzac Avenue.
