= Anzac Avenue =

Anzac Avenue Queensland
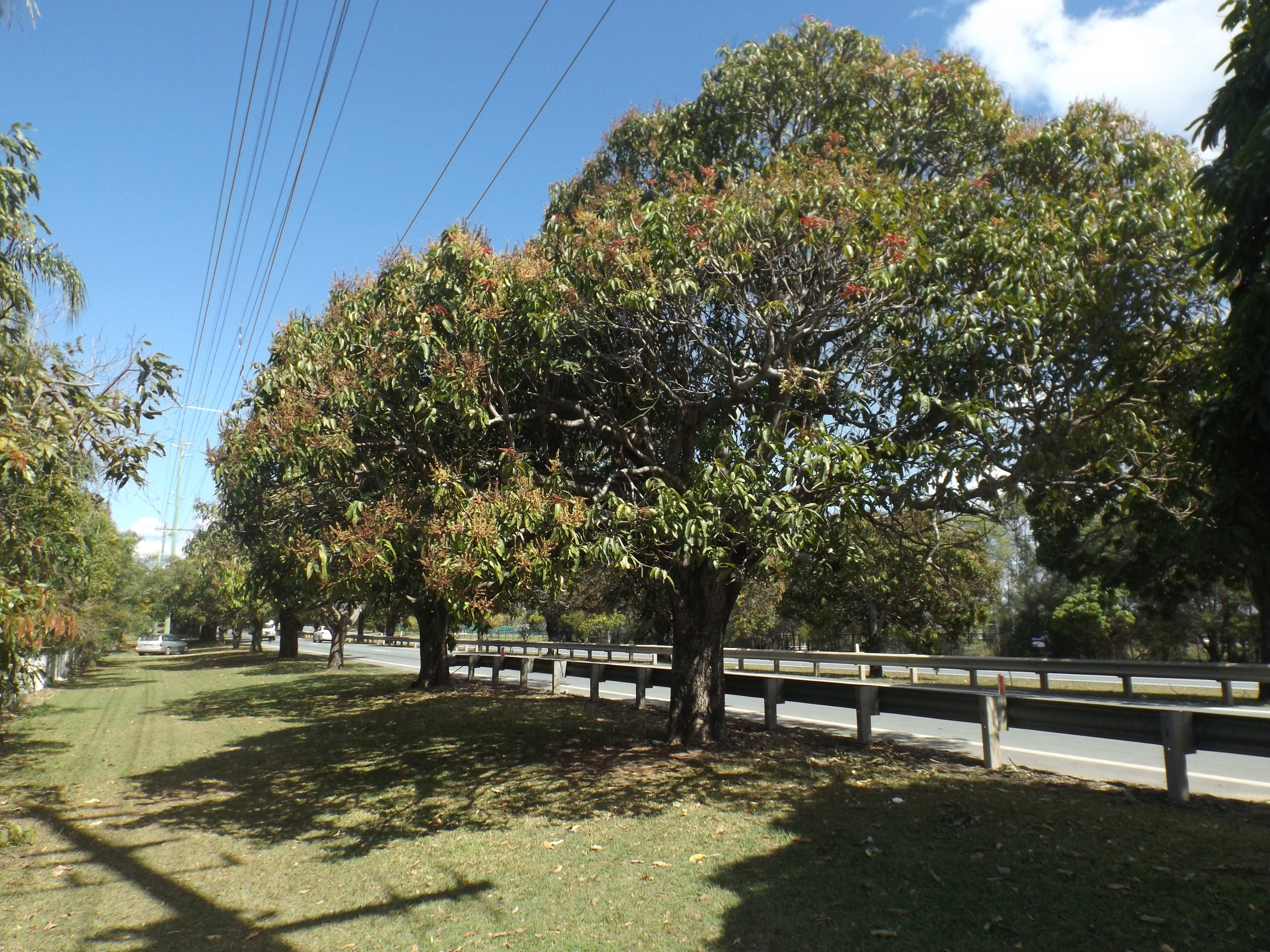
- Mango trees along Anzac Avenue at Mango Hill, Queensland

General information
- Type: Road
- Length: 17.8 km (11 mi)
- Route number(s): State Route 71; State Route 26 (Deception Bay Road – Elizabeth Avenue)

Major junctions
- West end: Gympie Road / Dayboro Road (State Route 58), Petrie
- Bruce Highway (M1); Deception Bay Road (State Route 26); Elizabeth Avenue (State Route 26); Oxley Avenue (State Route 27)
- East end: Redcliffe Parade / Marine Parade, Redcliffe

Location(s)
- Major suburbs: Petrie, Kallangur, North Lakes, Mango Hill, Rothwell, Kippa-Ring, Redcliffe

Anzac Avenue is a heritage-listed major arterial road lined with trees in the City of Moreton Bay, Queensland, Australia. It runs 17.8 kilometres (11.1 mi) from Petrie to Redcliffe, with most of the route signed as state route 71. The route was formerly the main route to the Redcliffe peninsula, until the Hornibrook Bridge was opened in 1935.

Opened in 1925, Anzac Memorial Avenue (as it was originally named) is the longest World War I memorial avenue in Queensland and was the first bitumen motor road connecting Brisbane to the popular holiday resort of Redcliffe, and reflects the growth in car usage in the early 1920s. It was added to the Queensland Heritage Register on 5 February 2009.

The road provides the quickest access to the Peninsula Fair Shopping Centre, as well as being the main access road for the Redcliffe Hospital.

== History ==
Anzac Memorial Avenue
- Location within Queensland
- 27.217251°S 153.062355°E
- Location: Anzac Avenue, Redcliffe, City of Moreton Bay, Queensland, Australia

History
- Design period: 1919–1930s (interwar period)

Queensland Heritage Register
- Official name: Anzac Memorial Avenue (former)
- Type: state heritage (landscape, built)
- Designated: 5 February 2009
- Reference no.: 602693
- Significant period: 1920s (fabric); 1920s–ongoing (historical use)
- Significant components: tree groups – avenue of, road/roadway

=== Early access to the Redcliffe peninsula ===
The first road along the route was an Aboriginal track used to access Kippa Ring, then the site of a prominent bora ring located about 3 miles (4.8 km) north-west of Redcliffe.

Tom Petrie guided a picnic party to the Redcliffe seashore from Petrie (then known as North Pine) in 1859. A road from Bald Hills to Redcliffe was formed by the early 1860s, but by 1864 this was almost impassable. Tom Petrie marked a track from the Hays Inlet crossing and in the early 1870s assisted in surveying the road. Known as the "Brisbane Road" it became the primary way of accessing the Redcliffe Peninsula by road.

Redcliffe's growth as a seaside resort occurred from the late 1870s. In this era, frequenting seaside resorts became increasingly popular in Australia. Taking in sea air and bathing in saltwater were promoted for their health giving properties. From 1876 a weekly mail service began to Redcliffe via North Pine (Petrie) and a passenger and goods service to Brisbane was established by 1880. The opening of the Redcliffe Jetty in 1885 enabled people from Brisbane to visit in large numbers on steamers, bringing 10,000 passengers in 1889–1890. By the end of the 1880s, the Redcliffe Peninsula was the largest tourist resort area between Sandgate and Noosa Heads. Guest houses and hotels were built to cater to the burgeoning tourist trade.

By the turn of the century, coaches ran three times a week to North Pine. The poor condition of the road made the trip between Brisbane and Redcliffe difficult, impassable in wet weather. 1885 marked the first of many attempts to pressure the Queensland Government for a railway branch off the North Coast railway line. A potential route was surveyed in 1893, but various lobbying attempts up until 1915 were unsuccessful. By the start of the 1920s, a trip to Brisbane for Redcliffe residents was by road via Petrie or a boat/train connection from Sandgate, both long journeys of up to four hours.

Redcliffe's future prosperity depended on reducing its isolation from Brisbane. Its small permanent population grew little between 1900 and 1921. While large steamships brought thousands of people to the area, much of their time and money was spent onboard rather than locally. The growth in motor touring soon determined Redcliffe's linkage to Brisbane.

=== Memorial avenue ===
The loss of lives during World War I had a profound impact upon the Australian population and memorials became a prominent feature in communities throughout the nation. Monumental memorials were the most common expressions of remembrance. Memorials with a utilitarian function, such as a hospital or hall were also erected. This practical emphasis also extended to roads, often built with the aid of public subscriptions, additionally providing work for returned soldiers. Anzac Avenue is an example, as is Memorial Drive in Adelaide (1925) and the Great Ocean Road in Victoria (begun in 1918). Over 200 Avenues of Honour were planted along roads and in parks, a type of memorial found throughout Australia from 1917. Victoria planted more avenues than any other state. While "digger" statues were ubiquitous throughout Queensland, memorial avenues appeared to be less common.

Anzac Memorial Avenue was Queensland's largest construction of an avenue, an ambitious project achieved through public subscription. Most war memorials in Queensland towns and shires honoured servicemen from a specific area. Anzac Memorial Avenue had a wider memorial dedication, not only for residents of the Redcliffe and Petrie areas, but for Brisbane's population, whose support enabled the plantings to occur.

The early 1920s saw the beginnings of increasing car popularity in Queensland. The number of people driving cars between 1921 and 1923 more than doubled. Such considerable growth increased calls for adequate roads in both urban and rural areas, not only for economic purposes, but also as routes for motor tourists.

In response to these pressures, the Queensland government established the Main Roads Board in 1920. Prior to this, the onus was on local shire councils to fund road construction and management. They were largely unable to provide the finances or technical skills to respond to challenges posed by increased car use. After the Board's establishment, co-operative funding arrangements occurred with local councils, who largely maintained roads after their construction. The policy of the Main Roads Board was to construct roads that operated as feeders to railway networks and aided the development of newly settled and existing districts.

Prior to and after the Board's establishment, the Royal Automobile Club of Queensland (RACQ) occupied a central role in advocating for better roads for Queensland motorists. Thomas James Rothwell, President of the RACQ from 1921 to 1923, was the key protagonist in establishing the Petrie to Redcliffe Anzac Memorial Avenue. From 1914, the RACQ allied itself to the war time effort, raising funds and holding numerous benefits. Rothwell, a successful men's outfitter in Brisbane, was actively involved in such causes. During the war, he was secretary of the Queensland Patriotic Fund and coordinator of the Returned Soldiers Transport Corps, eventually awarded an OBE for his services.

Rothwell's initial impetus in advocating for the road came from a referral of the Brisbane Motor Traders Association, who "desired one good road in the vicinity of Brisbane", for motor touring purposes. This push also coincided with the Returned Services League's public appeal of "Work Not Charity" in support of the large number of ex-soldiers unemployed at the time. Rothwell saw the opportunity for these causes to coalesce, by constructing a good road for motorists that would provide employment to returned servicemen. Planting an avenue of trees along such a road would also create a significant Queensland war memorial.

The declaration of Gympie Road as a main road in 1921 informed the decision to choose the Petrie-Redcliffe road for Rothwell's proposal. By designating the Petrie-Redcliffe route as a main road, Brisbane motorists would gain a high quality motoring road from the city to a seaside resort, while reducing Redcliffe's isolation.

On 21 June 1922, the RACQ presented the case for the road to Harry Coyne, the Queensland Minister for Lands. Coyne agreed the road would likely be gazetted as a main road on the undertaking that non-government capital would be raised to begin its initial construction, while also suggesting the name of "Anzac Memorial Avenue". The Anzac Avenue Memorial Committee was established with Rothwell as chairman. A fundraising figure of £20,000 was set. This amount would provide for the wages of ex-servicemen employed on the road, while the Main Roads Board would bear the cost of construction materials.

Publicity for the fundraising appeal for the Anzac Memorial Avenue appeared in the Brisbane press on 1 July with the rationale for supporting the proposal:

"Every motorist is interested in this scheme. It is surely worth at least 5 pounds to a motorist to have one good road. Every business man is interested. It is surely worth a good deal to relieve the labour market of its unemployed. Every citizen is interested. It is surely worth something to you to have a Memorial Avenue that will at once connect one of Brisbane's beauty spots and commemorate for all time the valour of our soldiers."

As part of the public fundraising effort, a progress board was erected outside the premises of the Commonwealth Bank in Queen Street, Brisbane. A figure of a car moved forward in increments of 1000, towards the end goal of £20,000. 8 August was proclaimed as "Anzac Avenue Badge Day" with car badges sold to raise funds. Other events included social functions at Redcliffe. By December 1922, £7000 had been pledged by public subscription.

The target of £20,000 received a significant boost through government funding. In July 1922, the Australian Government, announced a National Main Roads Policy, allocating money to the state's road building schemes on a 4/8 federal, 3/8 state, and 1/8 local government funding arrangement. The objective of the policy was to "develop and open up the country, and promote land settlement, and aid temporarily unemployed soldiers".

Through this funding, the Redcliffe road was allocated £12,000, a larger proportion of funding than any other of the first roads built under this funding agreement in Queensland. The combined public fundraising (£7000) and government contributions (£12,000) meant that within six months of the appeal's inception, the goal of £20,000 was close to being realised. Of the £7000 subscribed, a final amount of £6290 had been received by 1926, with the Main Roads Board making up the difference.

The route was officially gazetted as the "Redcliffe Road" on 21 October 1922. Anzac Memorial Avenue was one of the earliest examples of Main Roads Boards' involvement in facilitating car-driven tourism in Queensland. The Board promoted Anzac Memorial Avenue for its dual purpose, as a road to a seaside resort that offered health benefits from a change of climate and scenic beauty, while providing developmental opportunities for the area. Until improvements to the South Coast and North Coast roads, Anzac Memorial Avenue was the premier road to a tourist resort from Brisbane.

By December 1922, 25 returned servicemen had begun work on the road. By March 1923, this number had increased to 50. A number were engaged in clearing the road and undertaking associated earth works. Others were constructing reinforced concrete culverts and the bridge over Hayes Inlet, cutting and bending steel for the reinforcing bars and preparing timber for form work. Eleven men were working at the quarry within the Beerburrum Soldier Settlement to source road materials.

The importance of the avenue was underscored by the decision to seal the road. In the early 1920s, few roads throughout Queensland were sealed, especially outside of urban areas. Different materials were trialled by Main Roads to determine their suitability as a top metal surface to dress with tar and bitumen. Anzac Memorial Avenue featured the use of trachyte, a fine grained igneous volcanic rock sourced from the Beerburrum quarry.

Work included constructing culverts to cross over Hays Inlet and Saltwater Creek, and associated earthworks to provide a stable base for the roadway in the often low-lying areas that the route passed through.

In early 1923, Pine Rivers Shire Council and Redcliffe Town Council were granted control of the road's construction in their respective areas. Main Roads maintained responsibility for dressing the top surface with tar and bitumen, this process occurring through 1924 and 1925.

Anzac Memorial Avenue was officially opened for traffic on 5 December 1925 by the acting Premier William Forgan Smith. A floral arch was erected in Petrie for the occasion, with the Mayor of Redcliffe, J.B. Dunn and Pine Shire Chairman, W Bradley, providing welcome speeches and thanking the government for its assistance. The party, in a long procession of cars, continued on to Redcliffe which was "en fete" for the occasion. The avenue was proclaimed as the best road to a tourist resort yet conducted in Queensland.

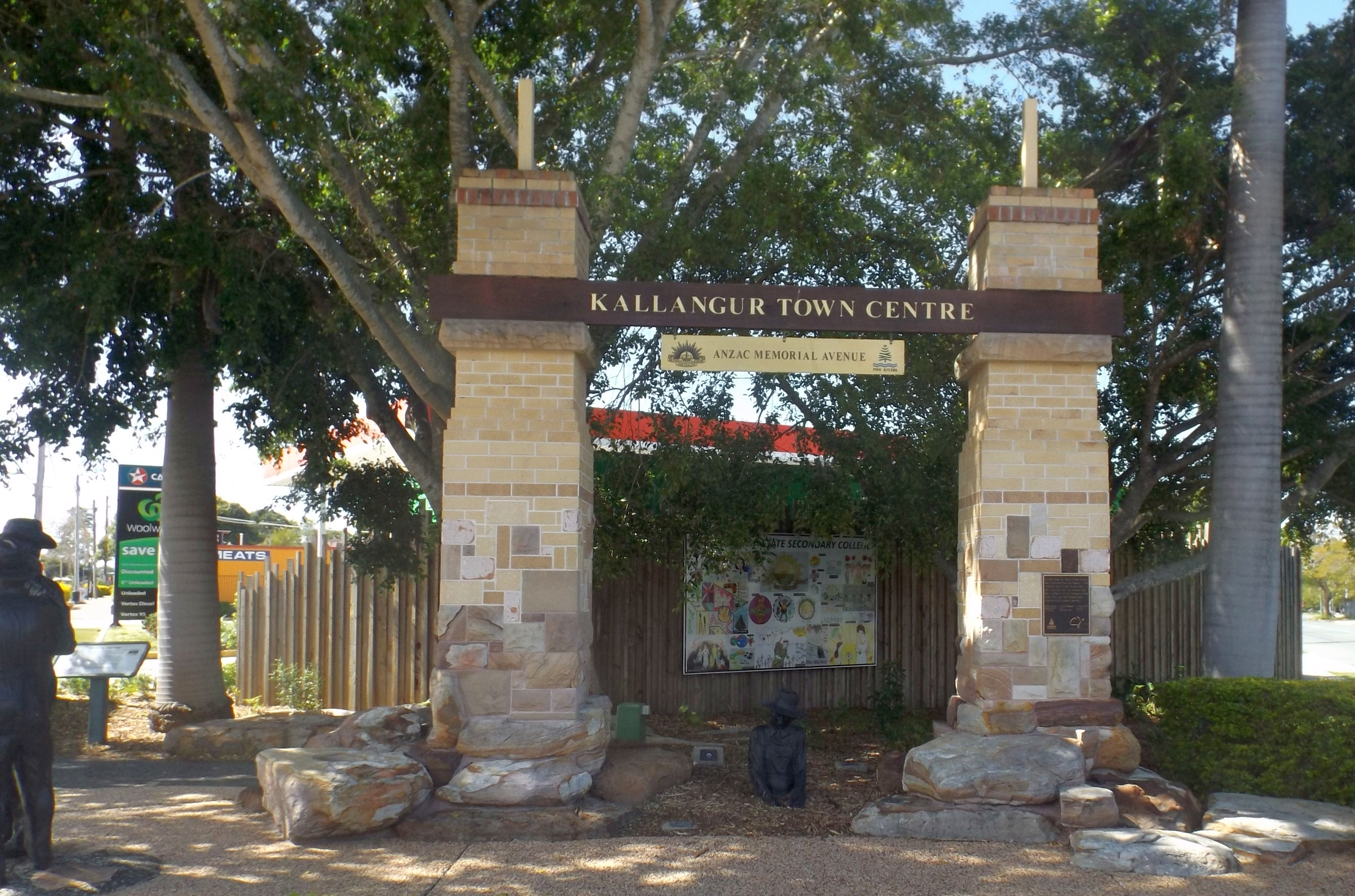
Memorial at Kallangur, 2016

In the week the road was opened, Rothwell wrote to the Brisbane Courier to draw attention to the tree-planting aspect of the memorial avenue. Rothwell noted the road was already utilised by hundreds of motorists on Sundays and public holidays. He called on the public to assist financially in making the road an avenue from Kedron Brook in Brisbane to Redcliffe, "a glorious asset to the State of Queensland". The first plantings were to be concentrated on the Anzac Memorial Avenue section between Redcliffe and Petrie.

The tree planting operations came more into focus in 1925 as the road works neared completion. An Anzac Avenue Memorial Tree Planting Committee had been established by early 1923. In December 1925, the committee comprised Rothwell, Ernest Walter Bick (curator of Brisbane Botanic Gardens), Edward Swain (Queensland Director of Forestry), Cyril Tenison White (Queensland Government Botanist), Henry John Moore (park superintendent of the Brisbane City Council) and Colonel DA Parsons (representing the Queensland Governor Matthew Nathan). The committee considered the types of trees that would be suitable and an estimate of the number of trees that would be required. Placing the trees 60 feet (18 m) apart, it was estimated 1760 trees were needed for each 10 miles (16 km) of the avenue and the cost of planting the trees, preparing the ground and making suitable guards would be less than £1 per tree. The committee selected a mixture of native and introduced sub-tropical species for the avenue.

The inaugural planting occurred at Petrie on 28 February 1925. Two Cocos palms (Arecastrum romanzooffianum) were planted at the front of the North Pine School of Arts in Petrie, by Governor Nathan. The trees were donated by Elizabeth Petrie, widow of local pioneer Tom Petrie. The palms were sourced from the extensive gardens of their nearby property "Murrumba".

During the ceremony, Rothwell discussed particulars of the tree-planting operations. Approximately £5000 was needed for planting trees along the avenue between Redcliffe and Kedron, "but for that purpose only £50 was in hand". Donors of trees would receive a certificate for their contribution. For a further small donation, a plaque could be attached on or near the tree with the donor's name or the name of the soldier in whose memory the tree was planted. Mrs Petrie was presented with the certificate for tree No.1, a firewheel tree (Stenocarpus sinuatus) planted on the corner of Anzac Memorial Avenue and White's Road, opposite the School of Arts. This tree has not survived.

On 7 July 1926 Rothwell and the president of the RACQ, Mr JE Carter, led a motorcade of guests from Brisbane for the official opening of Anzac Memorial Avenue, marked by a tree planting ceremony in Redcliffe. About 1000 invited guests, along with the general public, braved inclement weather to attend the ceremony.

The Australian Governor-General, Lord Stonehaven planted the first tree, a hoop pine (Araucaria cunninghamii) on the northern side of the Avenue, at the Humbybong Street corner. Granting local school children a holiday, Stonehaven hoped they would be "guardians of the trees" realising that they are guarding not only a Queensland memorial, but one that will be recognised throughout Australia. Lady Stonehaven, William Jolly (Mayor of Brisbane), JB Dunn, W Bradley and Mr Fraser East, President of the Returned Soldiers and Sailors Imperial League of Australia also planted trees.

Rothwell's speech highlighted the need for contributions, especially from the motoring public, to make the tree-lined avenue a reality. Rothwell also announced that the Memorial Committee had decided not to offer individual plate names to be associated with particular trees as the Avenue was considered a memorial for all the soldiers and sailors who had lost their lives, especially to commemorate "the deeds of valour performed by the heroes who went from our state".

By mid-1927, 1000 trees had been planted, encased in triangular wooden guards. The scale of the project provided challenges for the tree planting committee. While 2000 had been planted by 1933, unsuitable species and soil conditions, bushfires, human and animal impacts, borers and white ants, had damaged and destroyed some of the original plantings. With assistance from Main Roads, the committee were employing a man "with expert knowledge" to look after the trees. By this time, a shortage of funds meant the committee were unable to extend the planting scheme from Petrie to Kedron as proposed originally. Nevertheless, the avenue was still the largest of its kind in the state, made possible through public and private involvement.

Thomas Rothwell died on 28 January 1928 and his involvement with the Avenue was honoured on Sunday 9 April 1933 with the unveiling of the Rothwell monument by the Queensland governor, Sir Leslie Wilson. This stone obelisk was placed on a small triangular piece of land at the intersection of Anzac Memorial Avenue and the Deception Bay Road, later moving to a nearby park (27.2173°S 153.0451°E) when a roundabout was placed on the site. Rothwell bequeathed the substantial sum of £1000 to the tree planting committee, which was acknowledged at the unveiling as having maintained the project.

=== Subsequent years ===
The building of Anzac Memorial Avenue reduced Redcliffe's isolation from Brisbane and consolidated its position as the city's seaside resort of choice. In 1928, the Brisbane Courier remarked, "Petrie is today notable for the traffic which passes through it day and night". By the mid-1930s, the Brisbane-Redcliffe bus ran five trips daily, with extra services on weekends. A 1933 tourist brochure described the recent progress of Redcliffe as "remarkable", evidenced by the erection of new villas and cottages on the peninsula. In the same year Redcliffe Mayor Alfred Henry Langdon praised the construction of the road for advancing Redcliffe "beyond the expectations of the most sanguine". The opening of the Hornibrook Bridge in 1935 further reduced the distance between Brisbane and Redcliffe, a catalyst for the area's permanent population growth.

Until the late 1950s, when developers first began purchasing properties for subdivision, the landscape between Petrie and Redcliffe on Anzac Memorial Avenue remained predominantly rural, characterised by small mixed farms and sections of native vegetation. A number of farms capitalised on passing tourist trade by operating roadside fruit and vegetable stalls. Since this time, residential areas have extended along the avenue from both Petrie and Redcliffe, as northern commuter suburbs of Brisbane. Redcliffe's most westerly suburb was named Rothwell in 1971 by the Queensland Place Names Board in honour of the man who did much to bring the road to fruition.

Over time, Anzac Memorial Avenue has been widened to accommodate increased car usage. During the 1980s and 1990s, sections of the avenue were duplicated to form a dual carriageway. Some trees were removed during this time. In Pine Rivers Shire, the council and the Department of Transport adopted a design to preserve the Avenue during roadworks; however a number of trees were removed. In March 1993, Anzac Memorial Avenue was officially reopened by Queensland RSL President SW Kay and Pine Rivers Shire Chairman Rob Akers. Following the removal of a number of trees in 2006 for a transit lane, Queensland Transport and the Redcliffe RSL planted a memorial grove in Henry Pieper Park on the avenue at Kippa-Ring, with trees propagated from the slash pines. While originally named Anzac Memorial Avenue, the road is more widely known and signed as Anzac Avenue.

Other older trees have also not survived and records relating to the avenue once held by the RACQ and Main Roads Department no longer exist. The Cocos palms planted at Petrie by Governor Nathan in 1925 and the hoop pine planted in Redcliffe by Lord Stonehaven in 1926 still remain.

Despite alterations, the idea of the road as a Memorial Avenue has been perpetuated by later plantings. While not all the trees are from the original planting list, they are an intrinsic component of the avenue's overall composition. The Mango Hill section of the Avenue is notable for its 700 metres (2,300 ft) section of mango trees (Mangifera indica). There is a substantial section of mature slash pines (Pinus elliottii) between Kippa Ring and Rothwell, plus smaller sections at Kallangur. The first slash pines in Queensland were grown in Beerwah and Beerburrum from 1924. Director of Forestry Edward Swain, who introduced the trees from the United States, was a member of the tree planting committee in 1925.

Since the 1990s, along the Pine Rivers section of the road, different memorials commemorating theatres of war since 1945 have been erected.

Despite the construction of the Hornibrook Bridge in 1935 providing an alternative route by car to the Redcliffe peninsula, traffic volumes along Anzac Avenue steadily increased as the years went by, necessitating duplication of some sections of the road in the 1980s and the 1990s. This widening, although required in order to manage traffic congestion, resulted in the need to remove or relocate some of the tree plantings along the route, a move that was not without controversy at the time.

Although originally primarily a rural route, increasing population growth in the area, most notably the development of entirely new suburbs such as Rothwell and North Lakes, has meant that much of the route has taken on a suburban character, providing everyday access to residents, rather than being a tourist drive, as originally planned. The road was inducted onto the Queensland Heritage Register in 2009.

== Description ==
The significant elements of the listing comprise the route of the road, the vistas experienced within the route and the tree plantings noted in the description below.

Approximately 18 kilometres (11 mi) in length, Anzac Memorial Avenue travels from its intersection with Gympie Road at Petrie to its intersection with the roundabout at Redcliffe Parade, Redcliffe. It travels north-east through Kallangur, North Lakes and Mango Hill to Deception Bay Road at Rothwell, then turns east through Kippa-Ring and travels south-east for a further 750 metres (2,460 ft) before tracking east again and travelling as a straight avenue to Redcliffe.

The present road incorporates the original route with widenings to accommodate changed traffic conditions.

The Avenue incorporates culverts and bridge crossings, a memorial obelisk to Thomas Rothwell, memorials commemorating Australian participation in various war zones and a number of other public structures; these are not considered to be of heritage significance.

=== Plantings ===
The Avenue incorporates memorial plantings and other plantings including a number of mature trees. Notable plantings include:

- Two cocos palms (Syagrus romanzoffiana) at the entrance to the North Pine School of Arts
- Eucalyptus trees east and west of Lerose Avenue
- 700-metre (2,300 ft) mango tree (Mangifera indica) avenue between the Bruce Highway and Kinsellas Road, Mango Hill
- Slash pines (Pinus elliottii) at the intersection with Deception Bay Road and immediately west of the intersection
- Norfolk Island pines (Araucaria cunninghamii) along the Avenue through Rothwell
- Cotton trees and Eucalyptus trees in the median strip through Kippa Ring particularly between Klingner and Bremner Roads
- Slash pines west of Bremner Road
- Pine trees in the median strip from Nathan Street to the Klingner Road intersection
- A hoop pine (Araucaria cunninghamii) to the west side of the corner with Humpybong Street
- Poinciana trees (Delonix regia) along the road through Redcliffe, particularly between John Street and Victoria Avenue
- The fig tree at the roundabout terminating Anzac Memorial Avenue at Redcliffe
- Firewheel trees (Stenocarpus sinuatus)

=== Vistas ===
In addition to the amenity provided by the range of plantings along the road, the drive along Anzac Avenue provides many opportunities to enjoy vistas and views along and from the road including the vista east from Tilley Street to Redcliffe Parade towards Moreton Bay and towards the Fig tree terminating the Avenue at Redcliffe, and the vista west from Ashmole Street over the low area of Hay's Inlet and Pine Rivers towards Mount D'Aguilar, Mt Samson and Brisbane Forest Park.

== Heritage listing ==
Anzac Memorial Avenue (former) was listed on the Queensland Heritage Register on 5 February 2009 having satisfied the following criteria.

The place is important in demonstrating the evolution or pattern of Queensland's history.

Gazetted in 1922 and opened in 1925, following an earlier route established in the 1860s, Anzac Memorial Avenue was one of the earliest roads in Queensland constructed by the Main Roads Board. The Board was established in 1920 to respond to the greater demands on the road network posed by increased motor vehicle usage in the interwar period. Anzac Memorial Avenue is important in illustrating the early stages of this phase in the development of Queensland's road network.

As the first bitumen motor road from a major urban centre to a seaside resort, Anzac Memorial Avenue is important in demonstrating the growth of car based tourism in Queensland in the 1920s and illustrates the growing importance of car access to the development of tourist resorts. Anzac Memorial Avenue catalysed the growth of Redcliffe as a major seaside resort for south-east Queensland during the interwar period.

Built under a government policy designed to promote the development of roads that opened up areas for economic development, the Avenue demonstrates the increasing importance of tourism to the Queensland economy at the time. The Avenue was allocated a larger proportion of government funding than any other of the roads built under this funding agreement in Queensland at the time.

The longest WWI memorial avenue in Queensland, Anzac Memorial Avenue is important for commemorating Queenslanders' involvement in a major world event. The avenue has maintained its role as a place of memorial by subsequent additions commemorating later twentieth century theatres of war.

As a road constructed by returned servicemen, Anzac Memorial Avenue is a good example of a substantial scheme to assist ex-soldiers following WWI. Other initiatives included the state government soldier settlement schemes and other Main Roads projects. The construction of the road is important in demonstrating the involvement of government, civic bodies and the general public in addressing high levels of unemployment among ex-soldiers after WWI.

The place is important in demonstrating the principal characteristics of a particular class of cultural places.

In its route, and as an extensive tree-lined avenue of planned and evenly spaced plantings, Anzac Memorial Avenue is important in demonstrating the characteristics of a memorial avenue.

The place is important because of its aesthetic significance.

A landmark road in southeast Queensland, Anzac Memorial Avenue is important for vistas experienced while progressing along the route and for its plantings including poincianas, pines, cotton trees, eucalypts and the mango section.

The place has a special association with the life or work of a particular person, group or organisation of importance in Queensland's history.

Anzac Memorial Avenue is important for its association with Thomas Rothwell and the Royal Automobile Club Queensland (RACQ), an organisation that has made a major contribution to the development of motoring in Queensland. As president of the RACQ from 1921–1923, Rothwell was the key protagonist in the establishment of Anzac Memorial Avenue. Rothwell's contribution to the Avenue is commemorated by a memorial cairn standing at the road edge of Rothwell Park and a nearby suburb that bears his name.

== Route description ==
The current route begins in Petrie, at a roundabout intersection with state route 58 at Gympie Road and Dayboro Road. It proceeds north, then north-east, through Kallangur, before crossing the Bruce Highway near North Lakes. After passing the Westfield North Lakes shopping centre, it proceeds north-east again through developing urban areas near Mango Hill, before crossing Hays Inlet at Saltwater Creek, and intersecting with state route 26 at Deception Bay Road. Signed as both routes 71 and 26, it then turns eastward and proceeds through the suburbs of Rothwell and Kippa-Ring, reverting to route 71 only at an intersection with Elizabeth Avenue, before proceeding to Redcliffe, crossing state route 27 at Oxley Avenue, and terminating at a roundabout with Redcliffe Parade on the waterfront.

== Upgrades ==
=== Petrie intersection upgrade ===
A project to upgrade the intersection with Gympie Road and Dayboro Road at Petrie, at a cost of $30 million, was completed in March 2022.

=== Redcliffe safety works ===
A project to provide safety works at five intersections in Redcliffe, two of which are on Anzac Avenue, were underway at March 2022.

== Major intersections ==
The entire road is in the City of Moreton Bay local government area.

| Location | km | mi | Destinations | Notes |
|---|---|---|---|---|
| Petrie | 0 | 0.0 | Gympie Road (State Route 58) southeast – Strathpine, Brisbane / Dayboro Road (State Route 58) northwest – Dayboro | Western terminus of Anzac Avenue and State Route 71 |
| Kallangur | 5.6 | 3.5 | Bruce Highway (National Route M1) south – Brisbane / north – Sunshine Coast | Interchange |
| Rothwell | 10.4 | 6.5 | Deception Bay Road (State Route 26) north – Sunshine Coast, Nambour | Western concurrency terminus with State Route 26 |
| Kippa-Ring | 14.6 | 9.1 | Elizabeth Avenue (State Route 26) south – Clontarf, Brisbane / Boardman Road north – Newport | Eastern concurrency terminus with State Route 26, which continues south along Elizabeth Avenue |
| Redcliffe | 17.1 | 10.6 | Oxley Avenue (State Route 27) south – Margate, Brisbane / north – Scarborough | State Route 71 eastern terminus |
| Redcliffe | 17.8 | 11.1 | Redcliffe Parade north – Scarborough / Marine Parade south – Margate | Roundabout; Anzac Avenue eastern terminus |
1.000 mi = 1.609 km; 1.000 km = 0.621 mi: Concurrency terminus; Route transition

== See also ==
- Harry Coyne
