= Strathpine Honour Board =

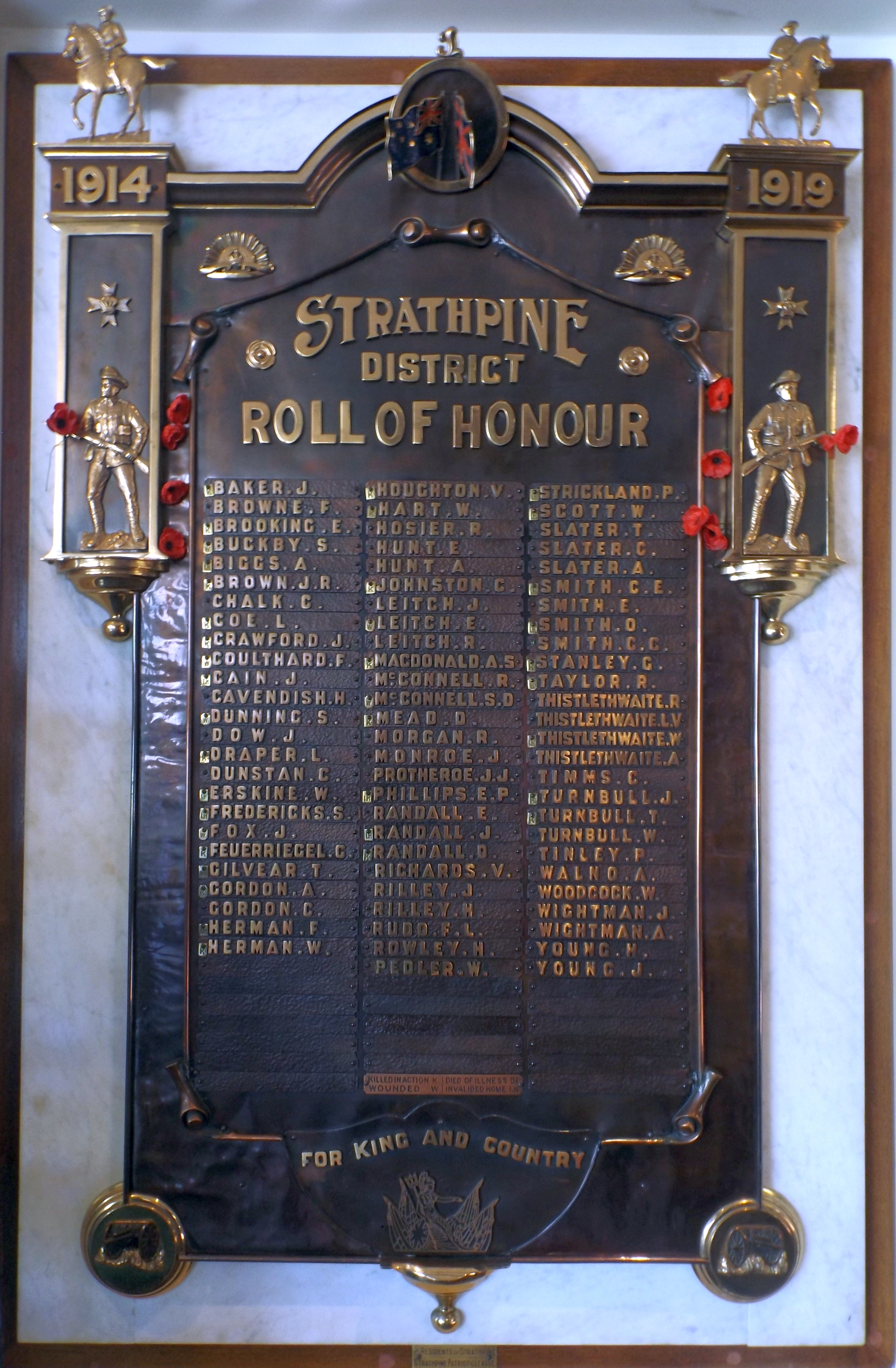
- Board in 2016

- Location within Queensland Location within Australia
- 27.2527°S 152.9882°E
- Location: 1347 Anzac Avenue, Kallangur, City of Moreton Bay, Queensland, Australia

History
- Design period: 1919–1930s (interwar period)
- Built: 1921–1985

Site notes
- Architect: Ernest Gunderson

Queensland Heritage Register
- Official name: Strathpine Honour Board
- Type: state heritage (built)
- Designated: 21 October 1992
- Reference no.: 600766
- Significant period: 1921– (social); 1921 (fabric – honour board); Post WWI (fabric – gates)
- Significant components: memorial – gun, flagpole/flagstaff, memorial – garden, memorial – gate/s, memorial – honour board/ roll of honour, memorial – plaque
- Builders: Ernest Gunderson

Strathpine Honour Board is a heritage-listed memorial at 1347 Anzac Avenue, Kallangur, City of Moreton Bay, Queensland, Australia. It was crafted in 1921 by Ernest Gunderson. It was added to the Queensland Heritage Register on 21 October 1992.

== History ==
This honour board was designed by leading Brisbane metal worker, Ernest Gunderson in 1921. It was commissioned by the Strathpine Patriotic League and hung in the Pine Rivers Shire Hall until 1980 when it was moved to the local RSL club.

The board lists in alphabetical order the 76 names of local men who served in World War I. Some of the letters are missing and others were replaced in 1984 when a local, Fred Williams, refurbished the board.

Located near this honour board are other memorials to honour the districts service men. In 1985 the First World War Memorial Gates from the Lawnton Agricultural Show Grounds were relocated to Anzac Avenue and the area between the gates and club have been constructed as a memorial garden.

The Brisbane-based Gunderson firm manufactured cast bronze honour boards which were quite distinctive as the dark bronze background contrasted with the polished brass lettering and ornamentation. Gunderson's honour boards are unique to Queensland and few remain as intact as this example.

== Description ==
This World War I Honour Board is wall mounted in the old foyer of the Pine Rivers RSL and Services Memorial Club.

The honour board is made of bronze on a marble background with timber edging. Predominantly rectangular in shape, the board has a panel to either top corner featuring a cavalryman with the Queensland state emblem and a soldier below. There are two enamelled flags at the top in the centre, the current Australian flag and the Union Jack, and on either side is the emblem of the AIF. At the bottom in the centre is a plastic replica of Brittania, with the words "For king and country", and in each of the bottom corners is a cannon.

The roll of honour features names on separate beaten plates screwed to the board with lettering beside indicating whether the person was killed in action, wounded, died of illness or returned home, many of which are missing. The lettering is in gold and the background is a dull brown metal finish. The board has a handcrafted quality but the figures appear to have been cast.

In the same foyer is a timber honour board for North Pine State School. It has two columns supporting a curved timber gable with a central carved wreath in relief. Names are listed in two vertical panels and all lettering is in gold.

There is also a cast metal plaque dedicated to the RSSAIAL featuring a crown with a sailor, soldier and airman in a centre circle. Also depicted are the Irish clover, Scotch thistle, English rose, Welsh leek and Australian wattle.

The foyer opens to the north to a memorial garden. There is a paved central path with a low brick structure and plaque with the words Lest we forget. Two brick side walls with plates bearing the names of deceased members and three plaques with the emblems of the RAN, the AIF and the RAAF. There is also a flagpole and four rocks with plaques commemorating the US Army presence in Pine Rivers, the Vietnam War, all wars and all those lost at sea. The gardens also contain two guns and World War I memorial gates.

The gates have painted carved stone gateposts with decorative wrought iron gates. The two central gates are larger and roll on wheels for opening. The posts are square in plan with carved stone capitals. The centre two are larger with carved wreaths at the top front, and all the posts have marble memorial plaques attached commemorating the Great War, World War II, Vietnam, Malaya, Borneo and Korea.

== Heritage listing ==
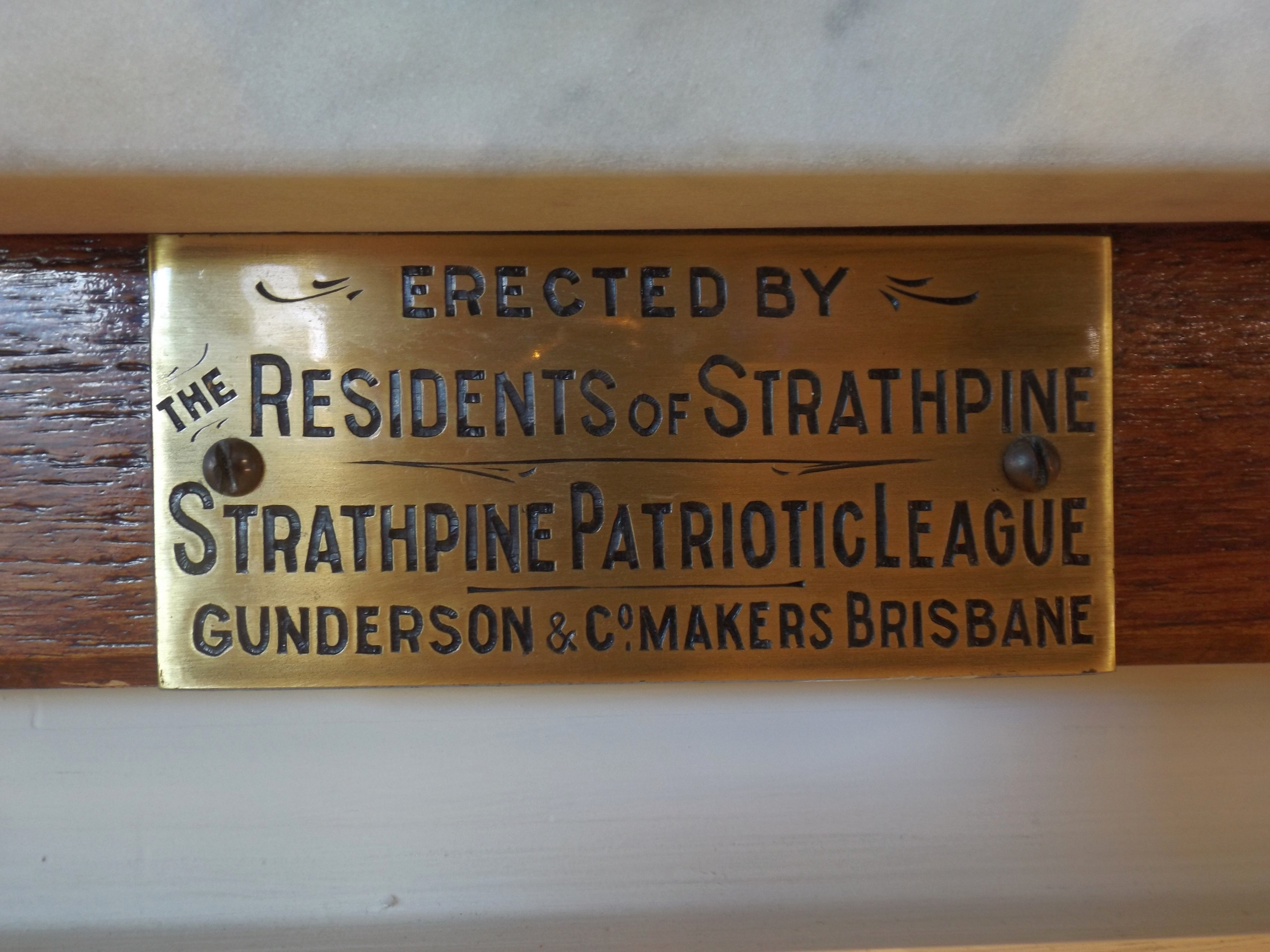
Plaque, 2016

Strathpine Honour Board was listed on the Queensland Heritage Register on 21 October 1992 having satisfied the following criteria.

The place is important in demonstrating the evolution or pattern of Queensland's history.

The honour board is evidence of a widespread social movement expressing the imperial loyalties of the period.

The place is important in demonstrating the principal characteristics of a particular class of cultural places.

The honour board member of a class of commemorative structures erected as a record of the local impact of a major historical event and intended to endure.

The place is important because of its aesthetic significance.

The honour board has aesthetic quality and craftsmanship, while the memorial gates are recognised for their aesthetic quality and streetscape contribution.

The place has a special association with the life or work of a particular person, group or organisation of importance in Queensland's history.

The honour board is a rare example of the work of Brisbane craftsman Ernest Gunderson.
