= Griffin, Queensland =

Griffin Moreton Bay, Queensland
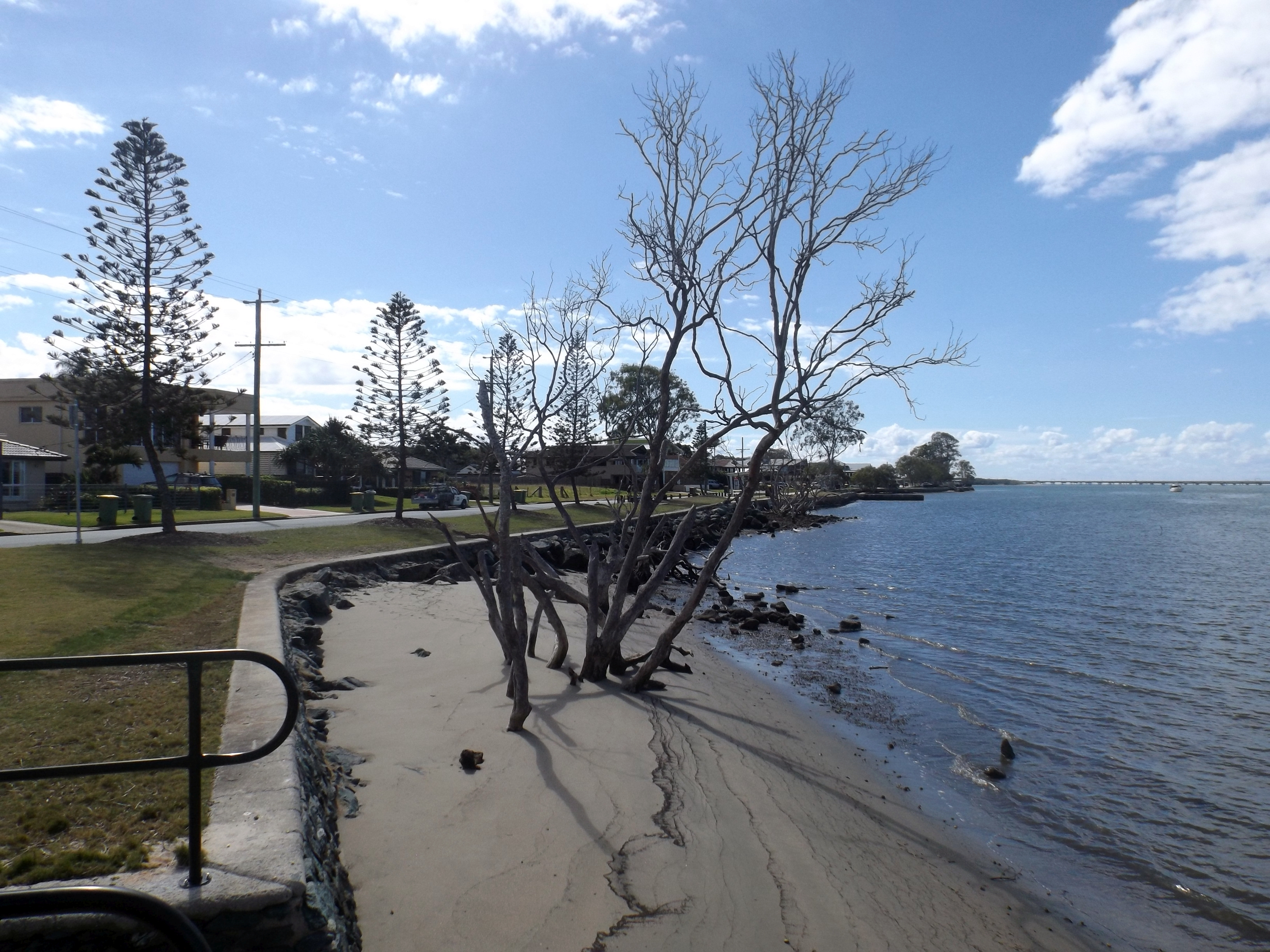
- Pine River along Dohles Rocks Road, 2016

- Coordinates: 27.2736°S 153.0483°E
- Population: 12,295 (2021 census)
  - Density: 714.8/km^{2} (1,851/sq mi)
- Postcode(s): 4503
- Area: 17.2 km^{2} (6.6 sq mi)
- Time zone: AEST (UTC+10:00)
- Location: 11.5 km (7 mi) NNE of Strathpine; 26.5 km (16 mi) N of Brisbane CBD
- LGA(s): City of Moreton Bay
- State electorate(s): Murrumba
- Federal division(s): Petrie
Suburbs around Griffin:
Kallangur	Mango Hill	Clontarf
Murrumba Downs	Griffin	Hays Inlet
Bald Hills	Bald Hills	Brighton

Griffin is a suburb in the City of Moreton Bay, Queensland, Australia. In the 2021 census, Griffin had a population of 12,295 people.

== Geography ==
Griffin contains both residential and agricultural land usage, as well as recreational, boating and fishing facilities along the northern shore of the Pine River. Further inland, the Pine River diverges into the North Pine and South Pine rivers.

Osprey House is an environmental centre located in Griffin along the Pine River. The centre features displays, boardwalks, a bird hide and other visitor facilities.

== History ==
The origin of the suburb's name is from the Griffin family who migrated to Australia from the Orkney Islands off the northern coast of Scotland.

Griffin State School opened on 1 January 2016.

== Demographics ==
In the 2011 census, Griffin recorded a population of 2,358 people, 50.9% female and 49.1% male. The median age of the Griffin population was 28 years, 9 years below the national median of 37. 73.6% of people living in Griffin were born in Australia. The other top responses for country of birth were New Zealand 6.9%, England 4.7%, South Africa 1.2%, the Philippines 0.6%, Fiji 0.6%. 89.3% of people spoke only English at home; the next most common languages were 0.6% Tokelauan, 0.5% Samoan, 0.4% Afrikaans, 0.4% Sinhalese, 0.4% Mandarin.

In the 2016 census, Griffin had a population of 6,839 people.

In the 2021 census, Griffin had a population of 12,295 people.

== Education ==
Griffin State School is a government primary (Prep–6) school for boys and girls at 19 Wesley Road (27.2566°S 153.0244°E). In 2018, the school had an enrolment of 697 students with 46 teachers (45 full-time equivalent) and 26 non-teaching staff (18 full-time equivalent). It includes a special education program.

There is no secondary school in Griffin. The nearest government secondary school is Murrumba State Secondary College in neighbouring Murrumba Downs to the west.

== Amenities ==
There is a boat ramp and floating walkway on Dohles Rocks Road on the north bank of Pine River (27.2776°S 153.0414°E). It is managed by the Moreton Bay City Council.
