= Manuel Hornibrook =

Australian builder and civil engineer

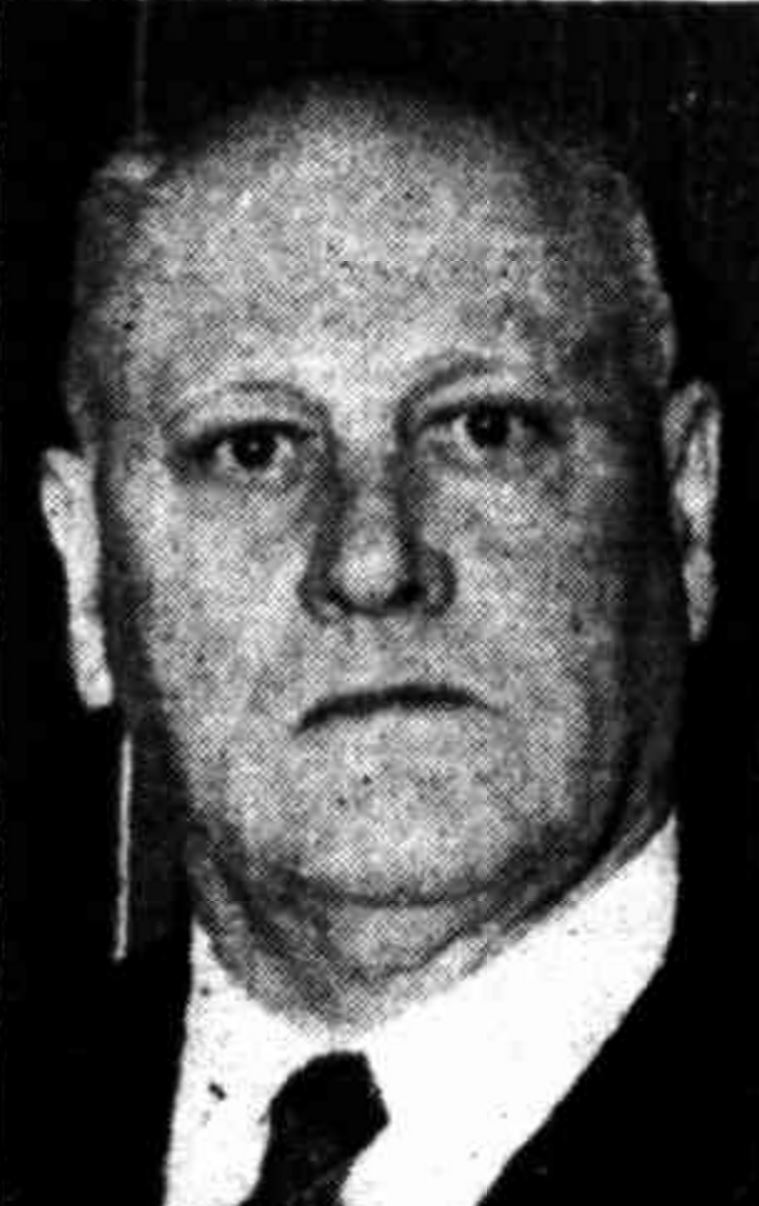
Manuel Hornibrook, 1954

Sir Emanuel (Manuel) Richard Hornibrook OBE (7 August 1893 – 30 May 1970) was an Australian builder and civil engineer. He founded the firm M R Hornibrook Pty Ltd that after merger with Baulderstone became one of the largest Australian civil engineering firms. Known as "MR", Hornibrook was knighted in 1960. He was highly respected and a builder of bridges across Queensland, New South Wales, Victoria, South Australia and Papua New Guinea as well as other major projects including Stages 2 (the Sails) and 3 of the Sydney Opera House.

== Early life ==
Emanuel Richard Hornibrook was born on 7 August 1893 in Enoggera, Brisbane, the second of seven children of John Hornibrook and his wife Catherine (née Sullivan). He was educated at Nambour, Obi Obi, Bowen Bridge and South Brisbane state schools.

== Building (and engineering) career ==
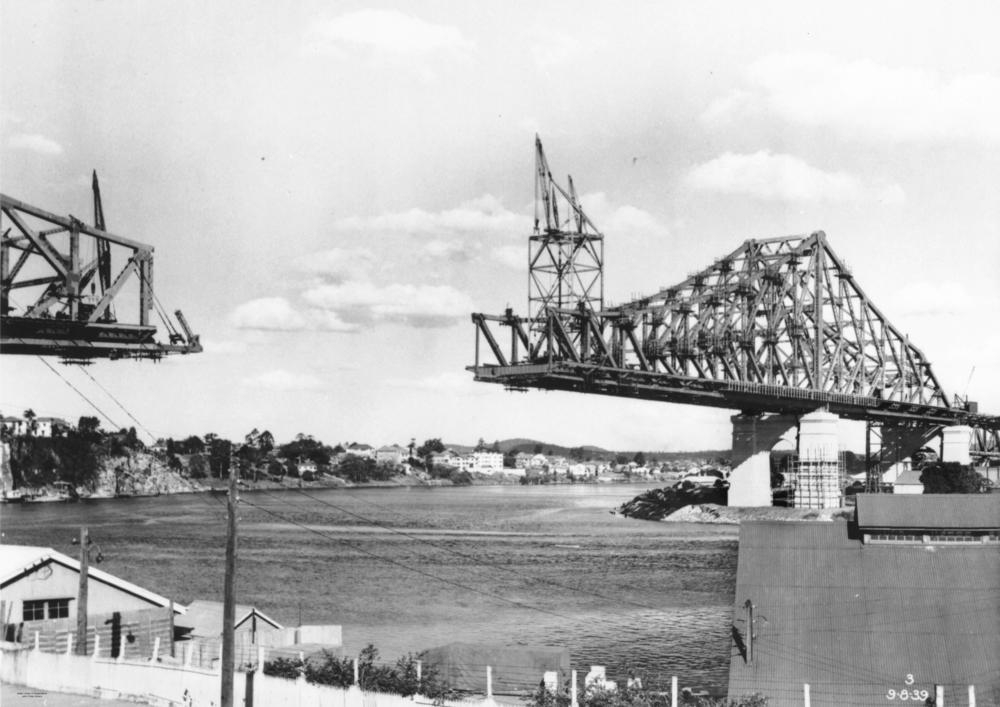
Story Bridge under construction in 1939

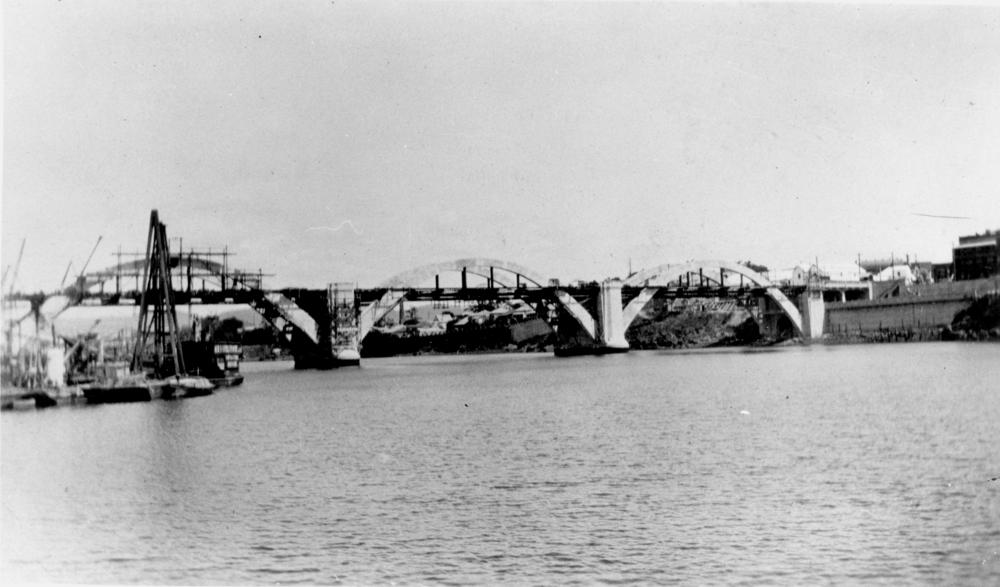
William Jolly Bridge in 1931

At the age of 13 Hornibrook commenced apprenticeship with builder HW Fooks. In 1912, at the age of 19, Horninbrook with his brother Reginald established their own business, which started with building drainage channels and sewerage systems. Soon the bridge building became Hornibrook's speciality.

The business quickly moved into civil engineering contracting, excavating Queensland's first open-cut coal mine at Blair Athol in 1923. The William Jolly Bridge built from 1930 to 1932 became his all-time favourite project because of the aesthetic appeal of the bridge and the pioneering use of the sand island method of pier construction.

In 1914 Hornibrook joined the Queensland Master Builders' Association and was its president in 1922 and 1923; he was president (1926) and a life member (1959) of the Master Builders Federation of Australia; he was also a foundation fellow (1951), councillor and National President (1952–56) of the Australian Institute of Builders (now Building), and a driving force in the construction of its headquarters at Milsons Point, Sydney. For his contribution to the science and the practice of building, he was awarded the A.I.B.'s first medal of merit (the AIB Medal, 1955). President (1953–59) of the Queensland Civil Engineering Contractors' Association, he was an honorary member (1968) of the Australian Federation of Civil Engineering Contractors and an honorary fellow (1969) of the Chartered Institute of Building (Britain)—the first Australian to be so honoured. He was appointed an Officer of the Order of the British Empire (OBE) in 1957 and knighted (as a Knight Bachelor) in 1960.

Sir Manuel Hornibrook was the Chief Engineer during construction of the Hornibrook Bridge which was named after him. He was also responsible for building Brisbane's Story Bridge and William Jolly Bridge. One of Hornibrook's most challenging projects was building the immensely complex roof shells of the Sydney Opera House, turning architect Jorn Utzon's dream into reality.

== Later life ==
Hornibrook died at the Holy Spirit Hospital on Wickham Terrace in Brisbane on 30 May 1970.

Hornibrook was posthumously inducted into the Queensland Business Leaders Hall of Fame in 2016.

== Family ==
Hornibrook married with Methodist forms Daphne Winifred Brunckhorst (9 March 1893–30 July 1978) on 27 November 1915 at her parents' home in Enoggera. His eldest son was Reginald Leo Hornibrook (1917–1926). His second son Clement Manuel Hornibrook (5 April 1919–1 February 1990) married Pamala Jean Moses (31 December 1925–7 January 2009) of the Hordern family on 12 March 1948 and had 5 children, including Robin Lyn Hornibrook (1949–16 August 2013). His daughter was Betty Winifred Hornibrook MacDiarmid (6 May 1927–17 December 2015).

== Publications ==
- Queensland 150 Years of Achievement, 2009, Kay Saunders, ISBN 978-1-921156-45-8
