= Murrumba Downs, Queensland =

Murrumba Downs Moreton Bay, Queensland
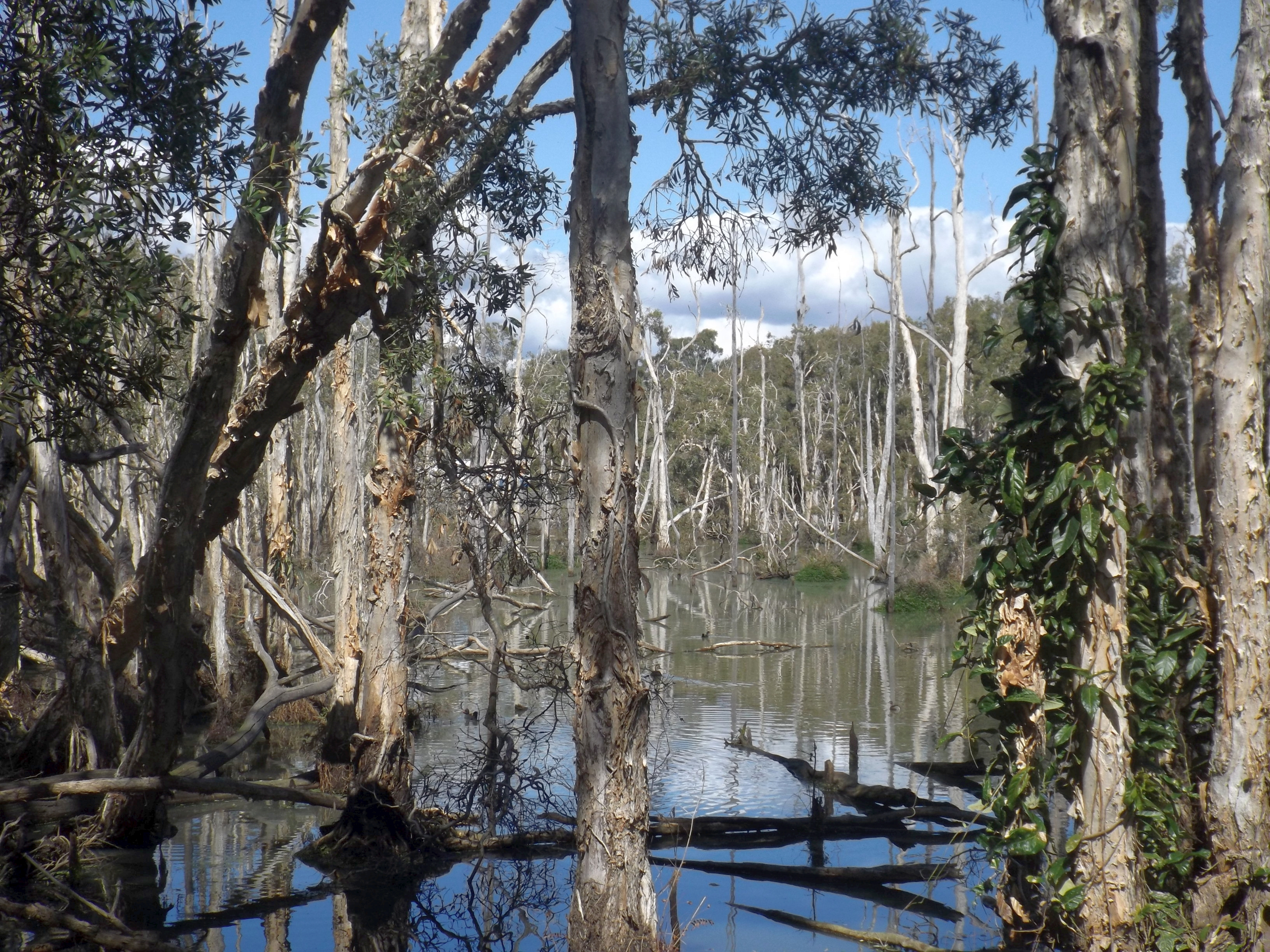
- Black Duck Creek, 2016

- Coordinates: 27.2700°S 153.0091°E
- Population: 10,795 (2021 census)
  - Density: 1,687/km^{2} (4,370/sq mi)
- Postcode(s): 4503
- Area: 6.4 km^{2} (2.5 sq mi)
- Time zone: AEST (UTC+10:00)
- Location: 8.7 km (5 mi) NNE of Strathpine; 24.6 km (15 mi) N of Brisbane CBD
- LGA(s): City of Moreton Bay
- State electorate(s): Murrumba
- Federal division(s): Dickson
Suburbs around Murrumba Downs:
Kallangur	Mango Hill	Griffin
Kallangur	Murrumba Downs	Griffin
Lawnton	Bald Hills	Griffin

Murrumba Downs is a suburb in the City of Moreton Bay, Queensland, Australia. In the 2021 census, Murrumba Downs had a population of 10,795 people.

== Geography ==
Murrumba Downs is located east of Kallangur on the Bruce Highway 24.6 kilometres (15.3 mi) by road north of the Brisbane central business district.

It is bounded by Fresh Water Creek to the north, the North Pine River to the south and Bruce Highway to the east.

== History ==
Murrumba Downs is on land that was part of the Murrumba property, bought by Thomas Petrie about 1858 and farmed by his family for almost 100 years. The name Murrumba was derived from the Yuggera word in the Yugarabul dialect meaning good or good place.

Undurba State School opened 23 January 1978.

Living Faith Lutheran Primary School opened on 11 January 2001.

Murrumba State Secondary College opened on 1 January 2012.

== Demographics ==
In the 2011 census, Murrumba Downs recorded a population of 9,393 people: 51.4% female and 48.6% male. The median age of the Murrumba Downs population was 35 years, 2 years below the national median of 37. 76.2% of people living in Murrumba Downs were born in Australia. The other top responses for country of birth were New Zealand 5.6%, England 4.9%, South Africa 1.1%, Scotland 0.7%, Philippines 0.6%. 89.6% of people spoke only English at home; the next most common languages were 0.9% Hindi, 0.4% Afrikaans, 0.4% Italian, 0.4% Spanish, 0.3% Tagalog.

In the 2016 census, Murrumba Downs had a population of 10,681 people.

In the 2021 census, Murrumba Downs had a population of 10,795 people.

== Education ==
Undurba State School is a government primary (Prep–6) school for boys and girls at 49–57 Ogg Road (27.2627°S 153.0080°E). In 2017, the school had an enrolment of 1,010 students with 72 teachers (64 full-time equivalent) and 46 non-teaching staff (29 full-time equivalent). It includes a special education program.

Living Faith Lutheran Primary School is an independent primary (Prep–6) school for boys and girls at 50 Brays Road (27.2558°S 153.0149°E). In 2017, the school had an enrolment of 508 students with 32 teachers (27 full-time equivalent) and 30 non-teaching staff (24 full-time equivalent).

Murrumba State Secondary College is a government secondary (7–12) school for boys and girls at 201–207 Goodfellows Road (27.2592°S 153.0077°E). In 2017, the school had an enrolment of 1,387 students with 107 teachers (103 full-time equivalent) and 40 non-teaching staff (28 full-time equivalent). It includes a special education program. It was the first secondary site in Queensland to introduce Year 7 into Junior Secondary as part of the Flying Start initiative.

== Transport ==
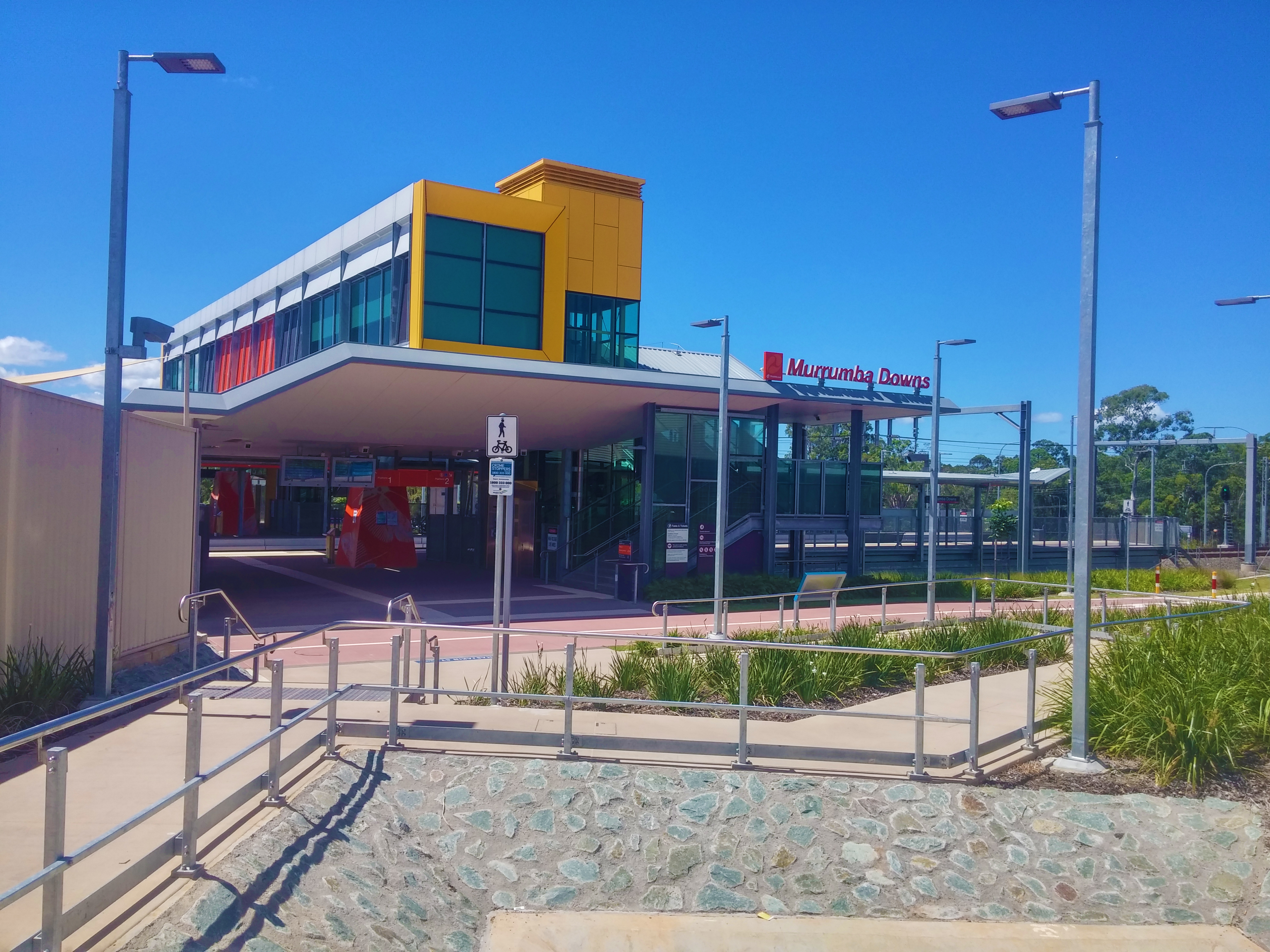
Murrumba Downs railway station, January 2017

Murrumba Downs railway station on the Redcliffe Peninsula railway line opened on 4 October 2016.

== Recreation ==
The 10-hectare (25-acre) John Oxley Reserve was named after the New South Wales Surveyor-General John Oxley. In 1823, Oxley rescued shipwrecked ex-convicts Pamphlett and Finnegan, who told him about a large river, meaning the Brisbane River, but led Oxley to the Pine River by mistake. Oxley named it "Deception River" because of this. The party travelled upstream to Oxley's Inlet. The reserve is a popular place for bush walking, social gatherings and children's activities.
