= Saltwater Creek (Moreton Bay) =

Coordinates: 27°13′24″S 153°03′20″E

Location
- Country: Australia
- State: Queensland

Physical characteristics
- Mouth
  - location: flows from Hays Inlet

Saltwater Creek is a creek in Rothwell, City of Moreton Bay, Queensland, Australia.

== Geography ==
It flows north from Hays Inlet and separates Mango Hill from Rothwell, formerly creating a border for Redcliffe City until the agglomeration of Moreton Bay City in 2008. Its name derives from the water being, in fact, salt water.

== See also ==
- List of rivers of Australia
