= Hays Inlet =

Coordinates: 27°15′08″S 153°03′46″E

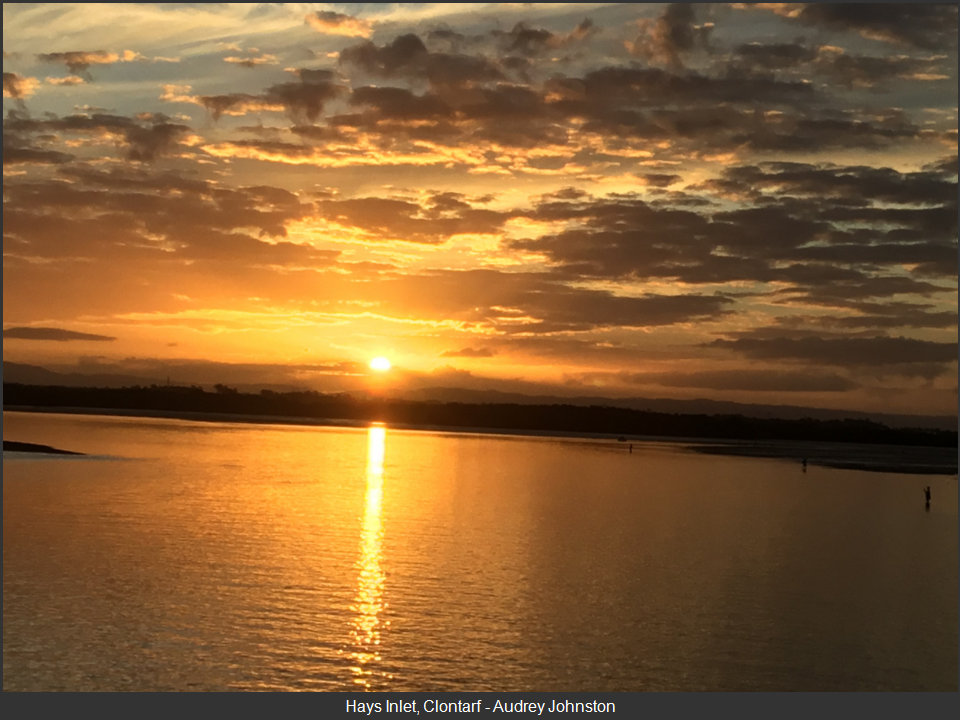
Hays Inlet from Clontarf, 2020

Hays Inlet is a saltwater inlet off Bramble Bay in the City of Moreton Bay, Queensland, Australia. The Brisway map reference is 420 L19. A mangrove forest is found in the inlet.

== Geography ==
The slender inlet forms the shape of the south-western Redcliffe suburb of Clontarf and the suburbs of Mango Hill and Griffin. Hays Inlet turns into Saltwater Creek at Rothwell, carrying the city boundary along it.

South of Hays Inlet is Pine River which flows into Bramble Bay. The Houghton Highway and the Ted Smout bridges span Bramble Bay, just east of Hays Inlet.

The original Hornibrook Bridge has been removed with the sections of each end retained as recreational fishing areas.

== Water quality ==
Green algae blooms have developed in Hays Inlet due to high nutrient concentrations.
