= Murrumba State Secondary College =

Location
- 201–207 Goodfellows Road; Murrumba Downs, Queensland; Australia
- Coordinates: 27.26°S 153.007°E

Information
- Type: Public, Secondary
- Motto: Learning for Life
- Established: 2012
- Principal: Sharon Cordiner
- Grades: 7–12
- Enrolment: 1687 Students (2024)
- Colours: Blue, red, royal yellow, charcoal and white
- Website: murrumbassc.eq.edu.au

Murrumba State Secondary College is an independent coeducational public secondary school based in Murrumba Downs in the local government area of the City of Moreton Bay, north of the Brisbane metropolitan area in Queensland, Australia. The school initially opened in 2012 as the first secondary school in Queensland to incorporate Year 7 as part of the Flying Start initiative.

Murrumba State Secondary College's role of Principal is currently held by Sharon Cordiner. The school also consists of three Deputy Principals, two Heads of School, one Business Manager, two Guidance Officers, one Information Services Manager, fifteen Leaders of Learning and six Deans of Students (one Dean per year level). As of 2024, there are 127 teaching staff and 55 support staff, giving the school a total population of 182 staff members.

As of 2024, there are 1687 total student enrolments at the school (856 male, 831 female). 4 are Indigenous, and 20% have a language background other than English.

== Excellence programs ==
=== Football Academy ===
The Football Academy is an Excellence program available to students from Years 7–10. The program aims to provide a pathway to a career in football for talented secondary-aged players.

=== High Performance Music ===
High Performance Music is an Excellence program for students from Years 7–10. It is designed to assist in the development of students’ all-round musicianship as well as using their passion for music to enhance their academic success. Students enrolling in the program complete an application and audition for successful entry.

=== Engineering Excellence ===
Engineering Excellence is an Excellence program for students from Years 7–10. Students in the Years 7–9 engage in a variety of different units such as Biotechnology, Design, Engineering, Environmental Engineering, Food Technology, Forensic Science, Polymers, Robotics and Sustainability. Units undertaken by Year 10 students in the program include Dynamics, Marine Engineering, Medical Engineering and Structural Analysis.

== Vocational Education & Training ==
Vocational Education & Training (VET) courses available to Years 11 and 12 students include:

- Certificate II in Engineering Pathways (MEM20413)
- Certificate II & III in Hospitality (SIT30616)
- Certificate II & III in Sport & Recreation (SIS30115)
- Certificate III in Active Volunteering (CHC34015)
- Certificate III in Aviation & Remote Pilots License (AVI30316)
- Certificate III in Early Childhood Education & Care (CHC30113)
- Certificate III in Fitness (SIS30315)
- Diploma of Business (BSB502155)

== Co-curricular activities ==
Co-curricular activities available to students at Murrumba State Secondary College include:

- Girls' Touch Training
- Instrumental Music Program
- Murrumba Culinary Club
- Opti-MINDS
- Rock and Water; a program that aims to enhance and promote self-respect, self-control and self-confidence.
- SciConnect; an extension of the science program which allows Year 9 Engineering Excellence Program students to mentor Year 5 and 6 students from local primary schools.
- Spanish Tutorials
- Student Volunteering and Community Service Program
