= Hornibrook Bridge =

Heritage bridge in Brisbane, Australia

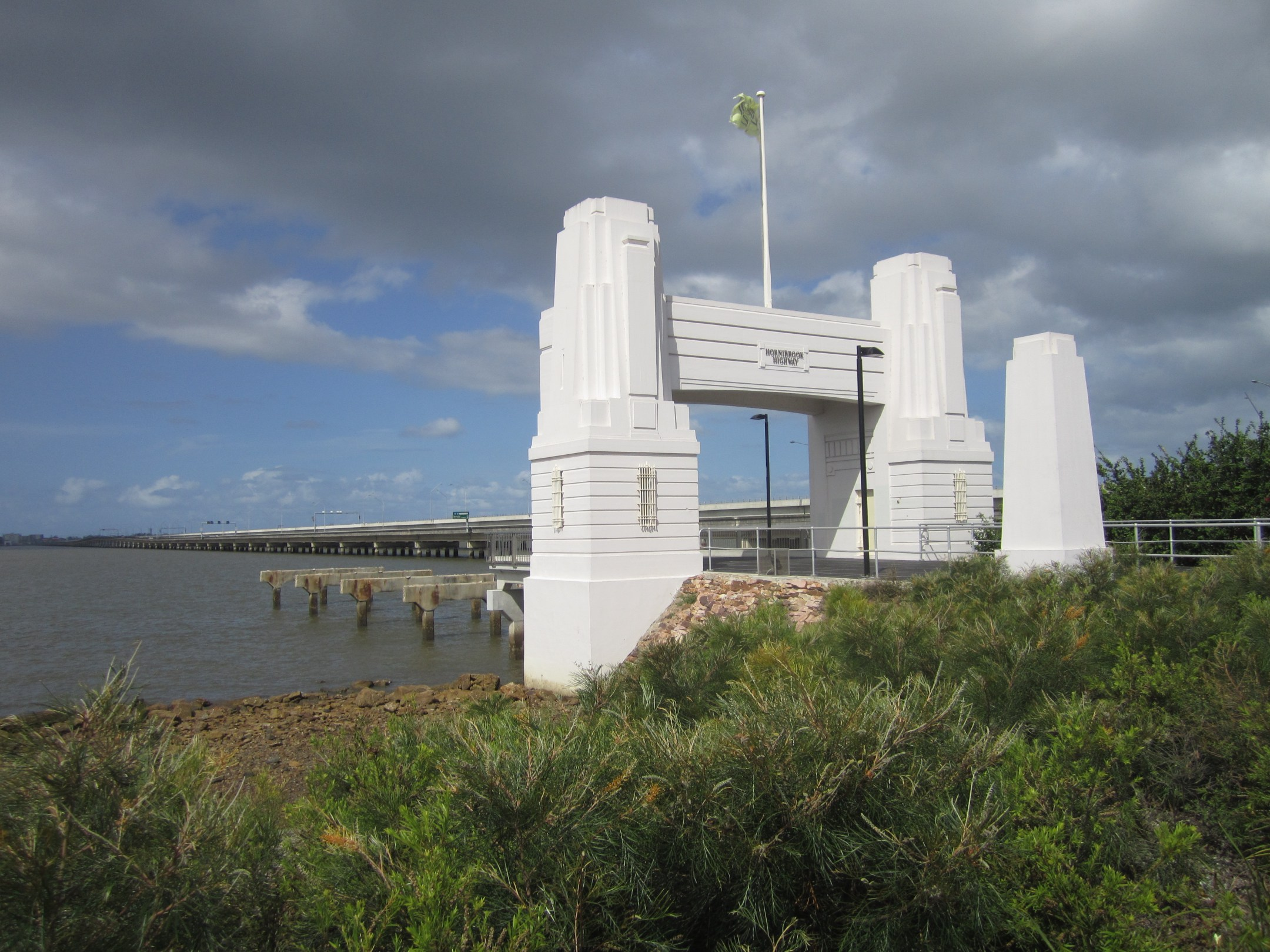
- Hornibrook Highway Bridge Southern Portal, 2012 after the demolition
- Coordinates: 27.278748°S 153.066802°E
- Carries: trucks, bicycle
- Crosses: Hays Inlet in Bramble Bay
- Locale: Brisbane, Queensland
- Heritage status: Queensland listed structure

Characteristics
- Design: Viaduct
- Material: Wood
- Total length: 2.684 km (1.668 mi)
- Width: 7.92 m
- No. of spans: 294

History
- Designer: Sir Manuel Hornibrook
- Construction start: 8 June 1932
- Opened: 4 October 1935; 90 years ago
- Closed: 14 July 2010; 16 years ago

Location
- Interactive map of Hornibrook Bridge

Hornibrook Highway Bridge
- Location within Queensland
- 27.2731°S 153.0712°E
- Location: Hornibrook Highway, Brighton, City of Moreton Bay, Queensland, Australia

History
- Design period: 1919–1930s (interwar period)
- Built: 1932–1935

Site notes
- Architect: Manuel Hornibrook

Queensland Heritage Register
- Official name: Hornibrook Highway Bridge
- Type: state heritage (built)
- Designated: 7 October 1994
- Reference no.: 601246
- Significant period: 1930s (fabric); 1935–1979 (historical use for road traffic)
- Significant components: pier/s (bridge), kerbing and channelling, pylon/s, office/s, strong room
- Builders: Manuel Hornibrook

The Hornibrook Bridge is a heritage-listed, mostly-demolished road bridge that carried the Hornibrook Highway over Hays Inlet at Bramble Bay from Brighton, a suburb of the City of Brisbane, to Clontarf in the City of Moreton Bay. The bridge was designed by the renowned engineer Manuel Hornibrook and constructed from 1932 to 1935. It was added to the Queensland Heritage Register on 7 October 1994.

Handsome art-deco concrete abutment arches frame the entry and exit approaches. Construction of the bridge was important for the growth of the Redcliffe Peninsula and made the commute to Brisbane shorter and quicker, increasing population growth and the number of visitors to the seaside town. The bridge was known colloquially by the locals as the "Humpity Bump" because the road surface of the bridge was so buckled. During king tides, waves would crash into (and sometimes onto) the bridge spraying the cars as they crossed.

The bridge was operated and maintained by a private company and a toll charged until 1975, with toll booths located on the Clontarf (north) end.

The Hornibrook Bridge was the first of three bridges to cross Bramble Bay. The second bridge is the publicly funded (non-tolled) Houghton Highway bridge, which was built with the intention of duplicating the crossing capacity of the two-lane Hornibrook Bridge in the 1970s, but the upgrading of the original Hornibrook Bridge was subsequently found to be uneconomic. The bridge closed to traffic in 1979 with the opening of the Houghton Highway, which had been intended to provide a duplicated crossing. The Ted Smout Memorial Bridge opened to traffic in July 2010, delivering the originally desired capacity increase and resulting in the demolition of the old Hornibrook Bridge, which had been used as a pedestrian and bicycle-only bridge since 1979.

== History ==
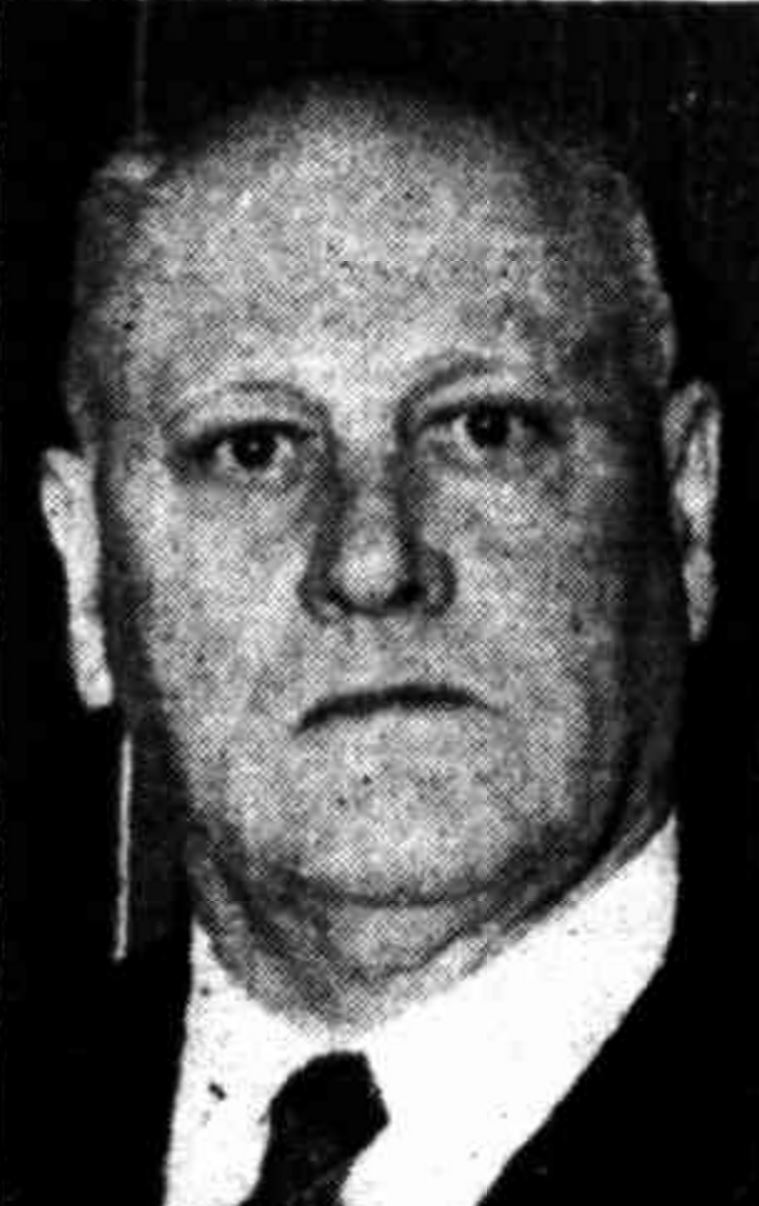
Manuel Hornibrook, 1954

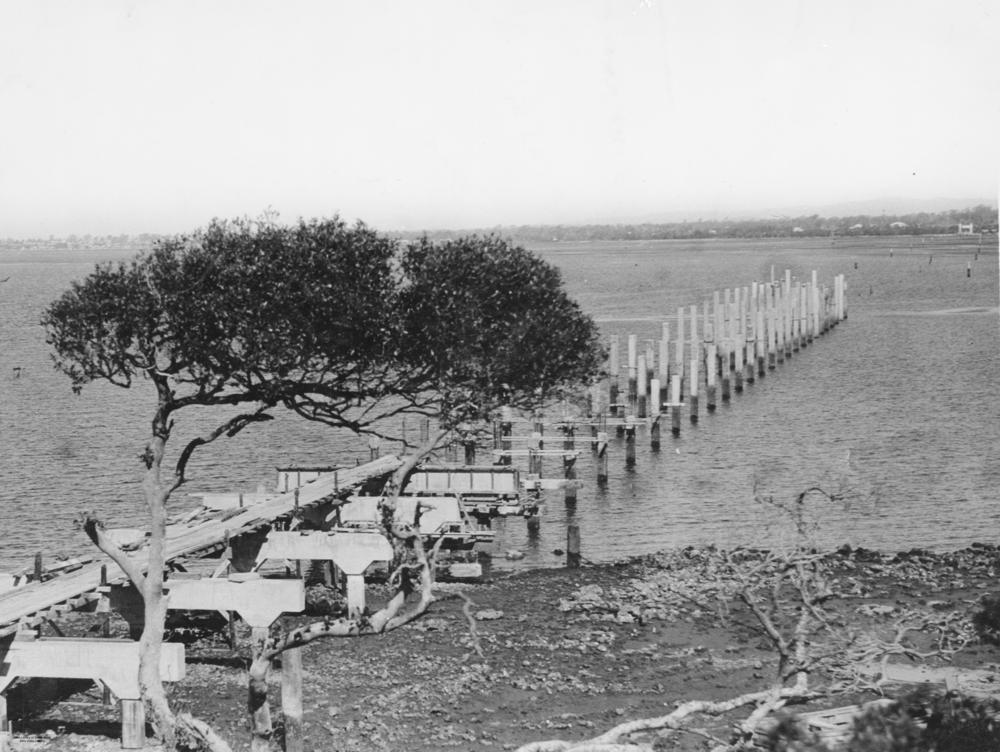
Building the bridge, 1933

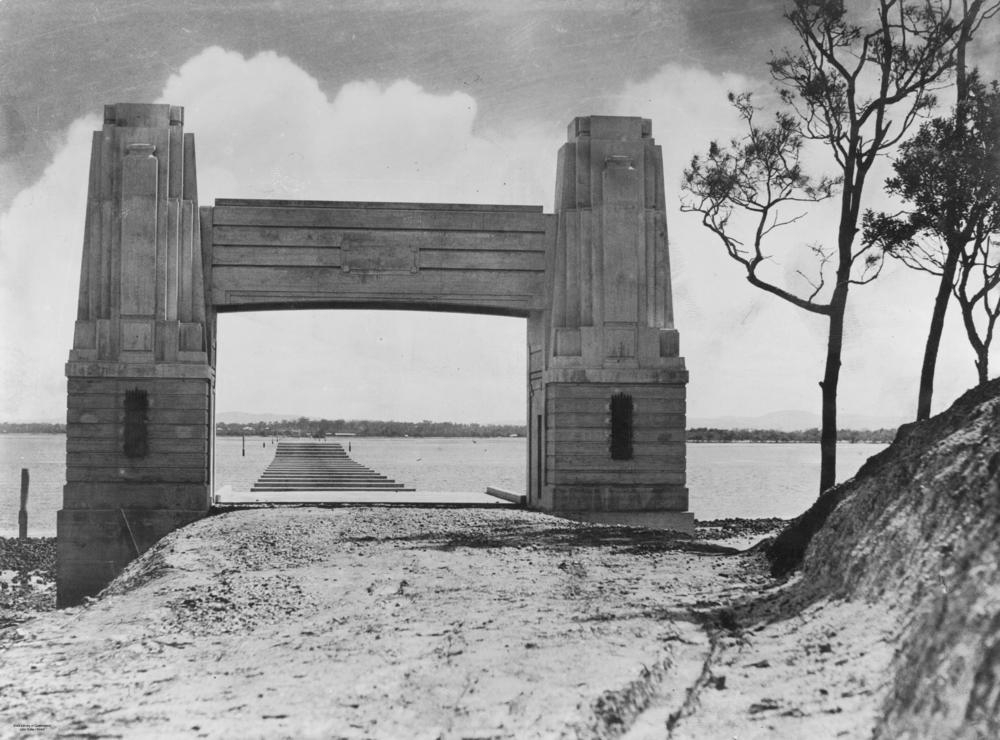
During construction, 1935

The Hornibrook Highway Bridge was constructed in the years 1932–1935, by the firm of M.R. Hornibrook. Conceived as a response to high unemployment during the Great Depression, it also represented an opportunity to end the isolation of the residents of the Redcliffe Peninsula.

Prior to the construction of the Hornibrook Viaduct, the Redcliffe Peninsula was accessed via two main methods of transport: ferry and road. Road transportation in particular was of great concern to the residents of the Redcliffe area. During times of wet weather, the Redcliffe road running via Petrie regularly became impassable to vehicles.

Several schemes had been drafted to improve the accessibility of the Redcliffe area to vehicle owners and also to the growing day-tripper market, having seaside holidays at Redcliffe. These schemes favoured the construction of a new road link across Hays Inlet and the mouth of the South Pine River. In 1926, the Redcliffe Town Council had proposed such a project be considered by the Main Roads Board.

Such a road link would involve crossing 2.7 kilometres (1.7 mi) of water by viaduct at a cost of £120,000. This road would then connect with the main road from Sandgate to Brisbane, avoiding the long drive via Petrie. M.R. Hornibrook had holidayed in this area and saw the development potential of the Redcliffe area being linked by road to Brisbane. The onset of the financial depression of 1929–1933 gave Hornibrook the impetus to plan and construct a road viaduct across from Redcliffe to Sandgate.

Major contracts for construction diminished with the deepening depression, and the decline in public spending. Hornibrook believed a major project was needed to keep together the construction force built up by his company during twenty-five years of work.

In 1931, Hornibrook approached the Queensland Government with a proposal to construct a toll bridge linking the southern part of Redcliffe with the Sandgate area. Initially, this proposal was rejected. After further consultation with the Queensland Government, an Act of Parliament was pushed through allowing for the involvement of private enterprise in the construction of toll facilities. Note that the Queensland Government was also in discussions with Walter Taylor regarding his proposal to construct a toll bridge (later known as the Walter Taylor Bridge) across the Brisbane River between Indooroopilly and Chelmer.

The terms of the contract with the Queensland Government set the toll price, as well as stipulating the length of lease. Hornibrook negotiated successfully for a forty-year lease on the projected road bridge.

The full extent of the project involved a road viaduct 2.68 kilometres (1.67 mi) in length plus associated roadworks. To finance such a major construction, a prospectus was issued to encourage local investment in Hornibrook Highway Ltd.

Work officially commenced on the project on 8 June 1932, but in its first eighteen months progress was limited, due to a lack of financing. The entry portals at either end of the bridge were completed in early 1933. Continuing financial difficulties forced Hornibrook to attempt to re-finance the company to finish the work as planned by 1935. The major flotation was assisted by a £100,000 loan from the AMP Society, guaranteed by the Queensland Government. Work recommenced at a faster pace from July 1934.

The portals were designed by architect John Beebe. Originally a Bendigo-based architect, Beebe moved to Queensland in 1916, and worked at the Queensland Works Department until 1926. He then moved into private practice in Brisbane until 1936.

Over 2.5 million superfeet of timber was needed to provide girders and decking on the bridge. Two sawmills were bought specially to process timber from Mount Mee and Conondale Range. 250 timbergetters were employed to cut the required amount of timber. Timber for the construction of the bridge was transported down the North Pine and Pine rivers on barges. The hardwood used in piles and girders mostly came from a timber mill owned by the Hornibrook Construction Company at Mapleton, transported from there to Nambour on the Mapleton Tramway, and then by Queensland Rail trains.

Concrete was supplied from the QCL works at Darra - the two portals being the first significant structures in Queensland to use material from this source.

The last plank on the viaduct was spiked into place on 7 September 1935. The bitumen road surface was laid in under three weeks setting an Australian record. The bridge originally had two traffic lanes and a pedestrian footpath. The construction of the bridge was similar to other bridges in Queensland, but when it was completed it was the longest road viaduct built over water in the Southern Hemisphere. At the time of completion, the bridge had a length of 2.684 kilometres (1.668 mi). It was the longest bridge in the Southern Hemisphere, and the second longest in the world after the Maestri Bridge in the United States. Up until its closure to road traffic in 1979, it was the longest vehicular traffic bridge in Australia.

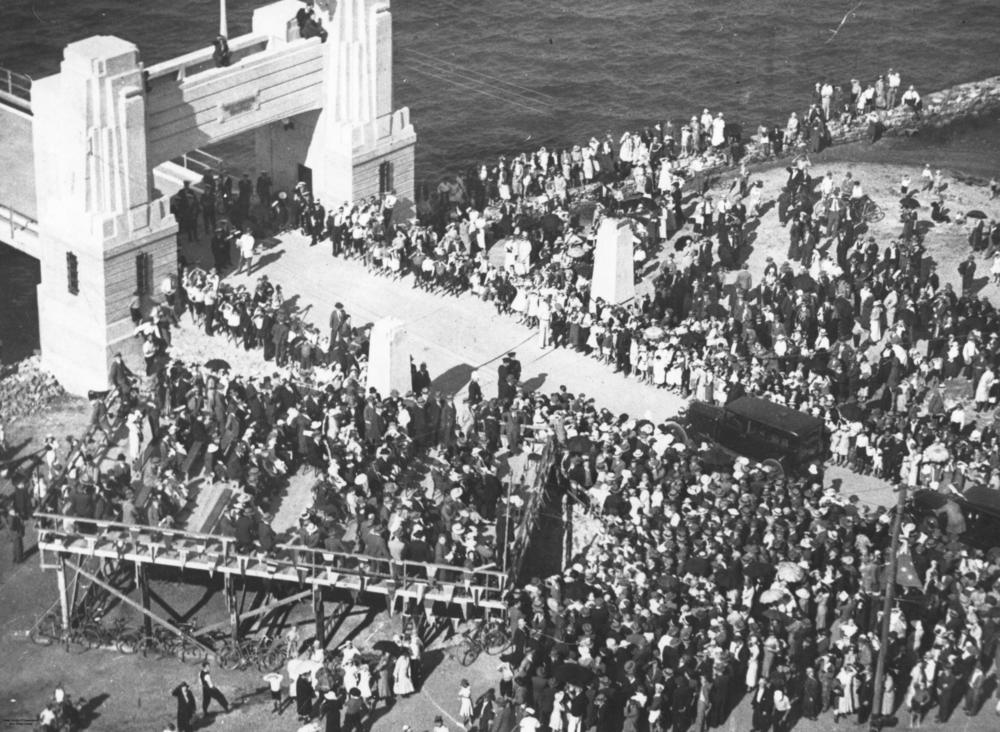
Bridge opening, 1935

The viaduct was opened to road traffic on 4 October 1935, foreshortening the road journey by several hours. Also a special coordinated road/rail bus service was inaugurated by the company to convey commuters between Sandgate and Redcliffe.

It was officially opened by then Queensland Premier Arthur Edward Moore on 4 October 1935. It was named after Sir Manuel Hornibrook, the chief engineer of the project.

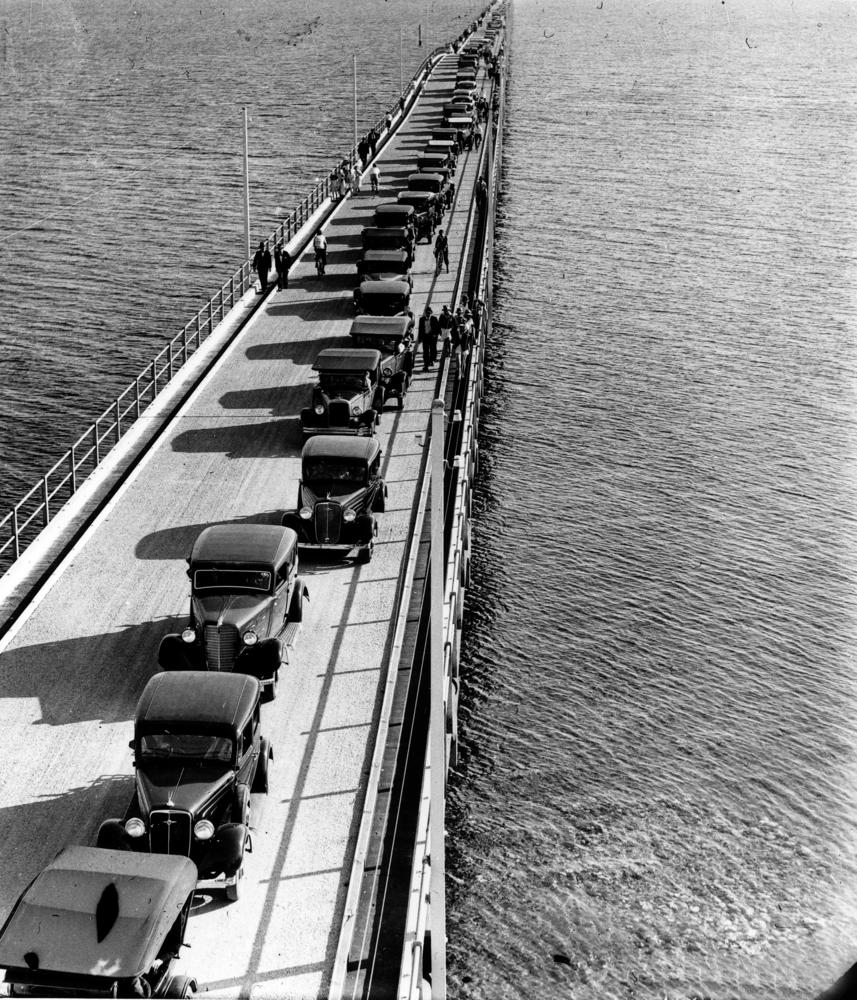
Aerial view of cars and pedestrians, 1935

The Hornibrook Highway played an important strategic role during the defence of Australia in World War Two. Military road convoys were able to use the highway to move war material efficiently to points in Queensland.

The Hornibrook Highway franchise was surrendered to the Department of Main Roads in 1975 after forty years of operation by the company. From this time the Main Roads Department assumed responsibility for maintaining the structure. By then, the increasing road volumes necessitated the investigation of carrying additional traffic. An additional viaduct was authorised by the Main Roads Department in 1977 to cope with increasing traffic flows to and from the Redcliffe Peninsula. The Houghton Highway as the new bridge was named opened to traffic in 1979. The publicly funded (non-tolled) Houghton Highway bridge was built alongside the Hornibrook Bridge, with the intention of duplicating the capacity. The project had intended to upgrade the Hornibrook Bridge as part of that project, but was subsequently found to be uneconomic. The Hornibrook Bridge was closed to traffic in 1979 with the opening of the Houghton Highway bridge.

From 1979, the Hornibrook Bridge was only used as a pedestrian and bicycle bridge, providing the only pedestrian and cycling link between the northern suburbs of Brisbane and the Redcliffe Peninsula. It also became a popular site for recreation and fishing. Although the bridge was heritage-listed in 1994, concerns arose about the cost of ongoing maintenance and whether the Queensland Government or local councils should pay for it.

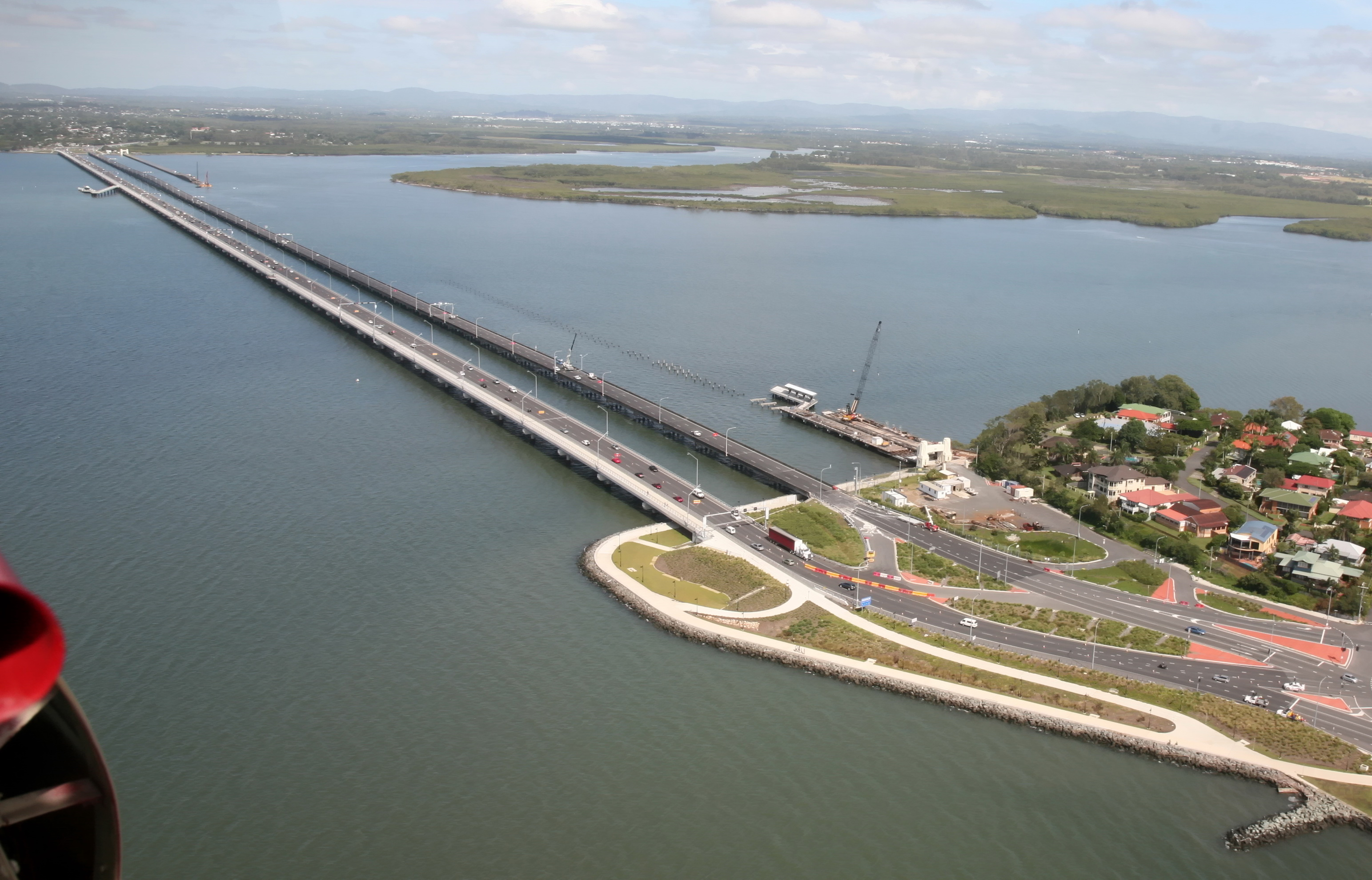
The three bridges from the Clontarf (north) side: Ted Smouth Bridge (left), Houghton Highway (centre) and Hornibrook Bridge (right, being demolished), April 2011

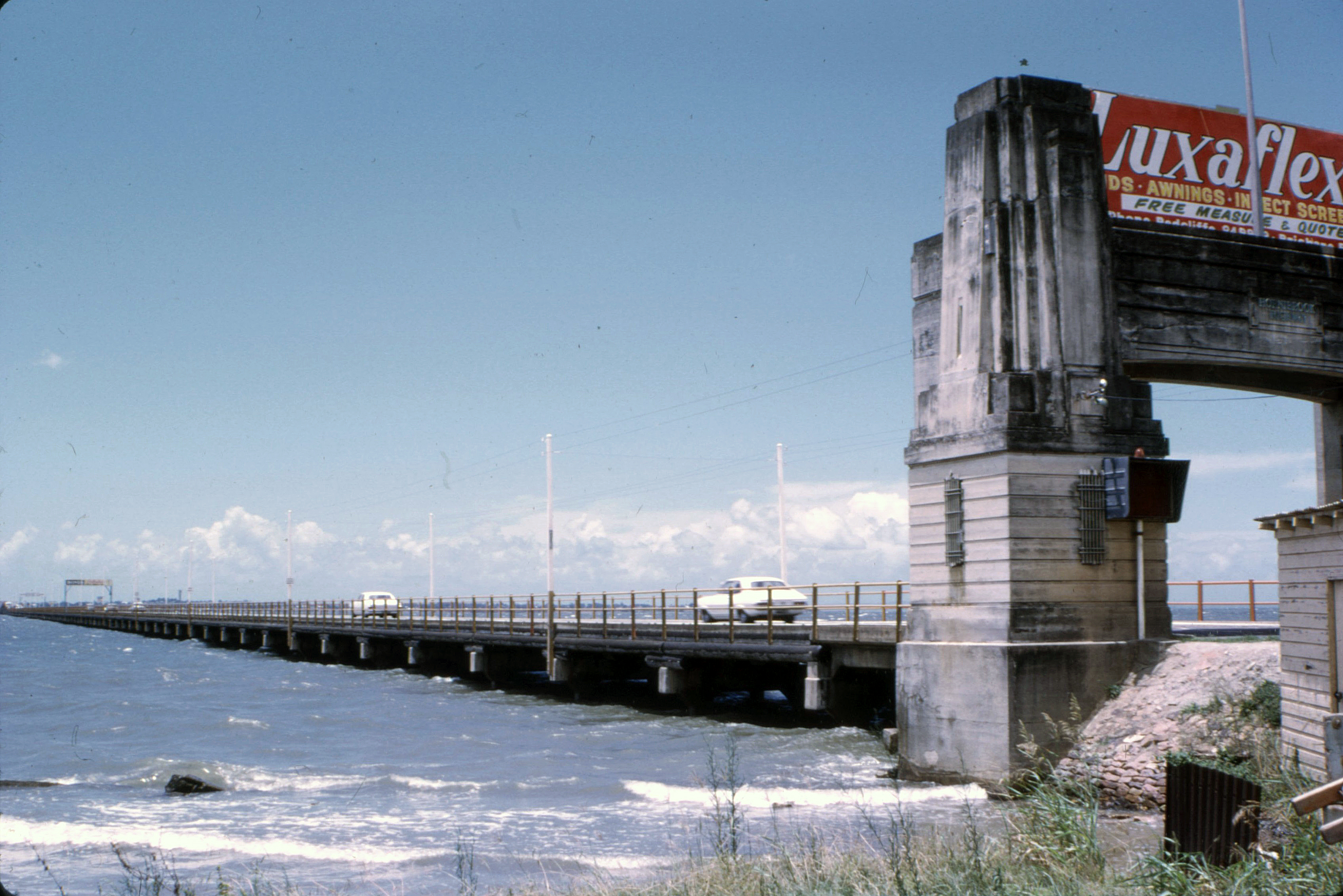
The Hornibrook Bridge in 1976

An additional (third) bridge, the Ted Smout Memorial Bridge opened to traffic in July 2010, delivering the desired capacity increase as well as providing pedestrian and cyclist access. As the Hornibrook Bridge was then no longer needed for pedestrian and cyclist access, it was closed on 14 July 2010. Before its closure, the Hornibrook Bridge was the longest footbridge in the world. Subsequently, the Poughkeepsie Bridge, located in Poughkeepsie, New York, United States, became the world's longest footbridge.

Despite the heritage listing of the Hornibrook Bridge in 1994, safety concerns about the rotting deck timbers led to the decision to demolish most of the bridge in mid 2011, retaining the north and south portals and 100 metres (330 ft) of bridge at the northern end for use by fishermen. The northern end of the bridge was officially reopened on 14 September 2011 as the Hays Inlet Fishing and Recreation Platform by Craig Wallace, Minister for Main Roads, Fisheries and Marine Infrastructure.

The Hornibrook Highway was a major catalyst in accelerating the urban development of the Redcliffe Peninsula and its surrounding area. In its planning, construction and operation it represented a major innovation in construction activities in Queensland at a time of economic crisis.

== Description ==
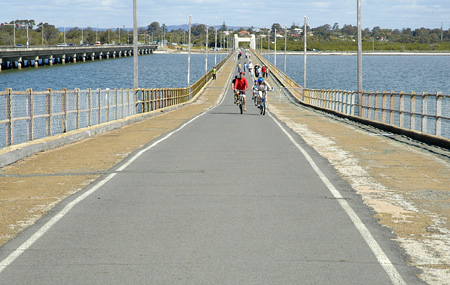
Pedestrian and cycling bridge, 2005

The Hornibrook Highway Bridge was a 2.685 kilometres (1.668 mi) long timber and concrete bridge that spanned Hays Inlet and Bramble Bay between Clontarf and Brighton, linking Sandgate to Redcliffe. It had identical rendered concrete portals at each end, and two rises along its length which permit small boats to pass underneath.

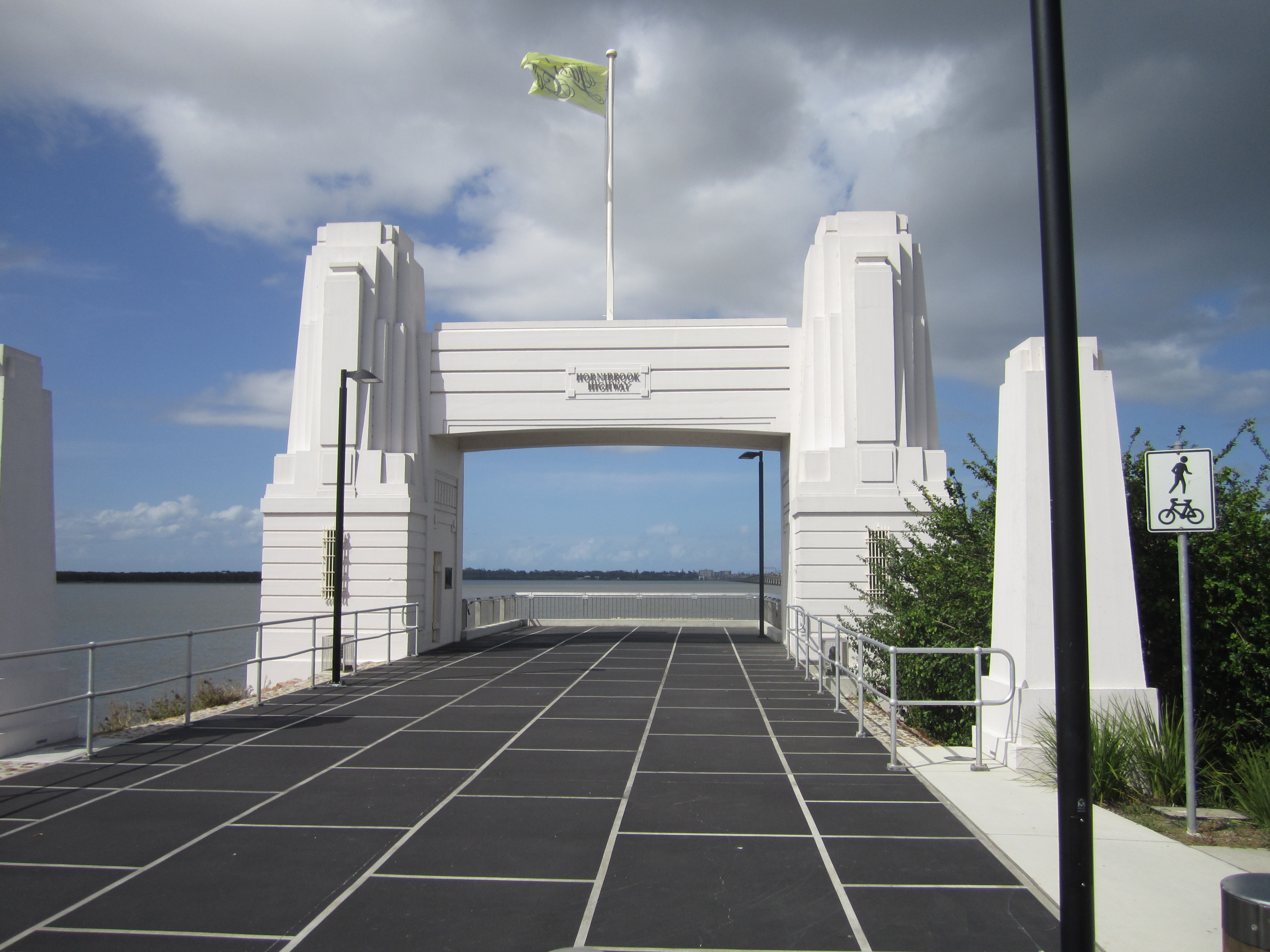
Southern portal, 2012

The bridge construction comprised a timber superstructure supported by reinforced concrete piers with three concrete piles of varying depths. The superstructure had substantial round ironbark girders on corbels, with girders supporting large section ironbark and tallowwood sawn decking. The decking was covered with coarse aggregate bitumen, and had concrete kerb edging. At each end, the first spans of the superstructure were constructed in ribbed reinforced concrete to protect the bridge from termites and fire.

The superstructure had a slight camber that permits periodic tightening of the deck via bolt fixings along the outer girders. The bridge had steel balustrades comprising steel stanchions supporting two circular hollow section rails and ironbark lightpoles along its length.

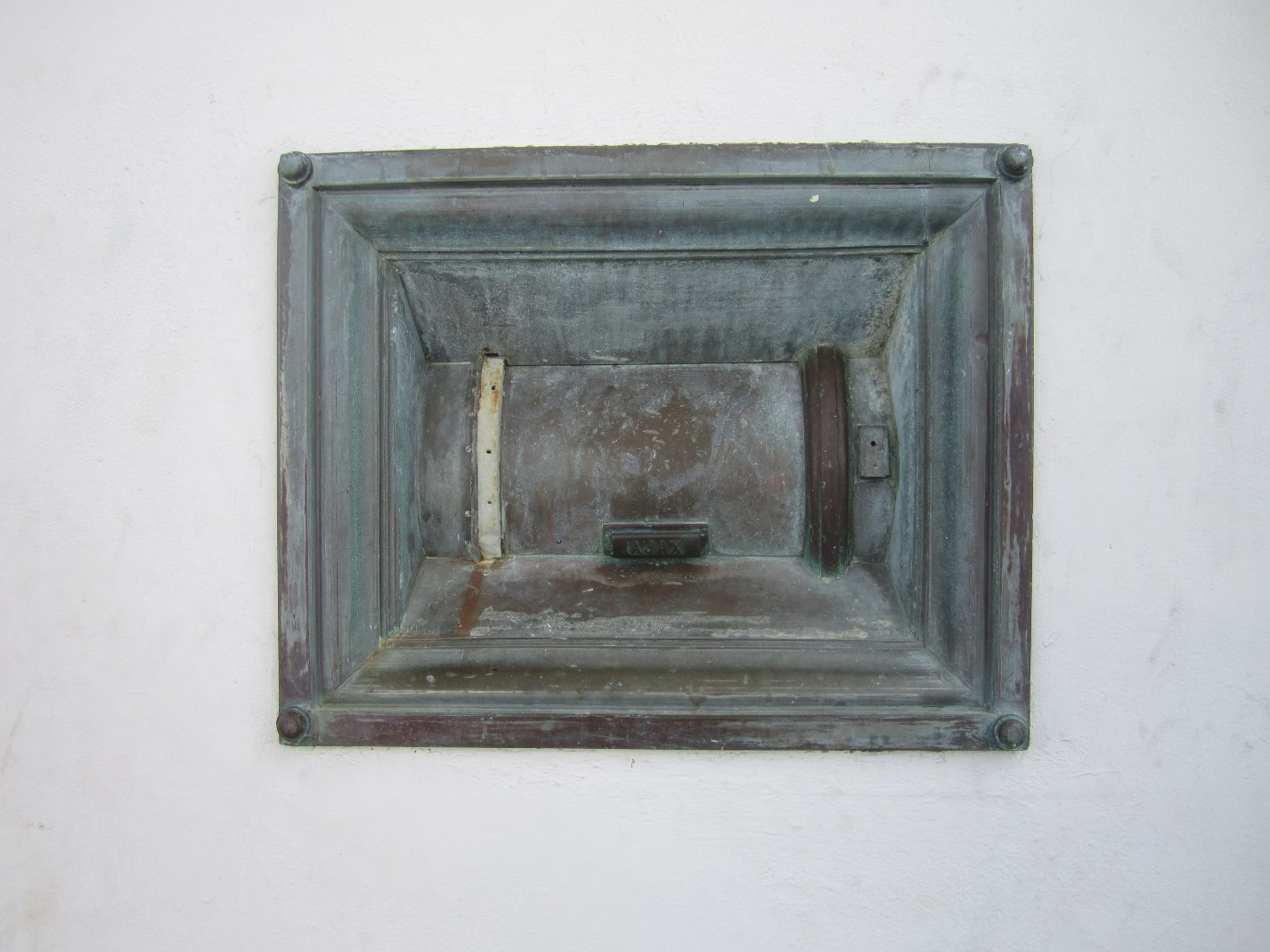
Night safe, 2012

The portals at each end (which still exist) are finely detailed monumental Art Deco structures comprising substantial pylons spanned by a deep spandrel facing landward, and more modestly detailed rectangular frames facing bayward. The pylons have banded rusticated bases on concrete pedestals, with central slot windows with decorative grilles on three sides, surmounted by stepped vertical elements. The spandrel is also banded, and has a rectangular central panel with the words "Hornibrook Highway" fashioned in raised brass lettering. The portals contain toll facilities, comprising a small office and strong room with night safe in the base of the pylons at each end. Externally these rooms are framed by Art Deco relief patterns. On the approach to the bridge the portals are preceded by smaller free-standing pylons either side of the road.

== Heritage listing ==
Hornibrook Highway Bridge was listed on the Queensland Heritage Register on 7 October 1994 having satisfied the following criteria.

The place is important in demonstrating the evolution or pattern of Queensland's history.

The Hornibrook Highway Bridge, constructed 1932–35, was one of the first road toll facilities in Queensland to be authorised by special act of parliament. It is notable as a major public work constructed by private enterprise at a time of economic depression in Queensland. The bridge was the major impetus for the development of Redcliffe.

The place is important because of its aesthetic significance.

The finely detailed monumental portals at each end have aesthetic quality.

The place is important in demonstrating a high degree of creative or technical achievement at a particular period.

In its planning, construction and operation it represents a major innovation in construction activities in Queensland at a time of economic crisis. Its significance also lies in its relationship to the vision of its builder, Manuel Hornibrook, to develop the potential of the city of Redcliffe.

=== Q150 icon ===
In 2009 as part of the Q150 celebrations, the Hornibrook Bridge was announced as one of the Q150 Icons of Queensland for its role as a "structure and engineering feat".

== See also ==
- Bridges over the Brisbane River
- Houghton Highway
- Ted Smout Memorial Bridge
