= Strathpine bus station =

Bus station in Brisbane, Queensland

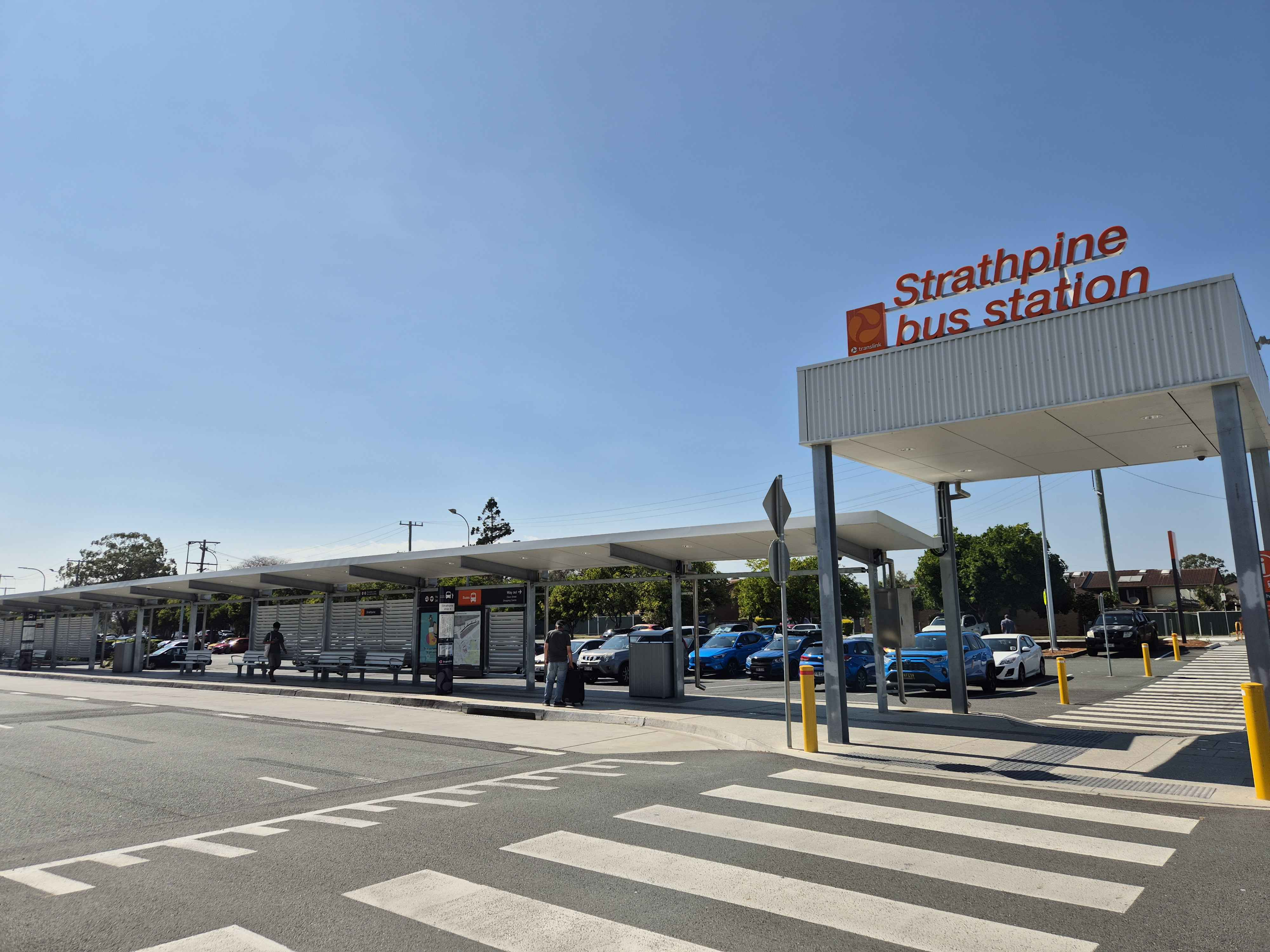
- Strathpine Bus Station, 2025

General information
- Location: Dixon Street, Strathpine
- Platforms: 4 side platforms
- Bus routes: 9
- Bus stands: 4

Construction
- Parking: Shopping Centre Parking
- Accessible: Yes

Other information
- Station code: 002486 (Stop A); 010595 (Stop B); 010642 (Stop C); 010298 (Stop D)
- Website: Translink

History
- Rebuilt: 2023
Location

The Strathpine bus station, at Strathpine, Queensland, is serviced by Translink bus routes. It is part of Strathpine Centre. The bus station was upgraded in 2023 to upgrade wheelchair accessibility and security.

== Bus routes ==
Bus routes to the Strathpine bus station are operated by Transport for Brisbane, Hornibrook Bus Lines and Thompsons Bus Service. The following bus routes service the Strathpine bus station:

Stop	Route number	Destination	Locations/Roads Serving
Stop A	670	Warner	Strathpine station, Nicol Way, Bray Park High School
Stop A	671	Samsonvale Road	Bray Park station, Warner
Stop A	672	Warner Lakes	Bray Park station, Bray Park, Warner
Stop A	674	Warner	Strathpine, Lawnton station, Lawnton
Stop B	669	Warner	Bray Park station, Lawnton station, Pinelands Estate
Stop B	673	Joyner	Bray Park station, Kensington Village, Bray Park, Francis Road
Stop C	680	Redcliffe	Lawnton, Petrie railway station, Kallangur, North Lakes bus station, Rothwell, Kippa-Ring
Stop C	680	Chermside	Bald Hills, Carseldine, Aspley
Stop D	327	Toombul	Bald Hills, Bracken Ridge, Taigum, Zillmere, Geebung, Wavell Heights, Nundah
Stop D	338	Chermside	Brendale, Eatons Hill, Albany Creek, Bridgeman Downs, Aspley
