= Thompsons Bus Service =

Australian bus operator

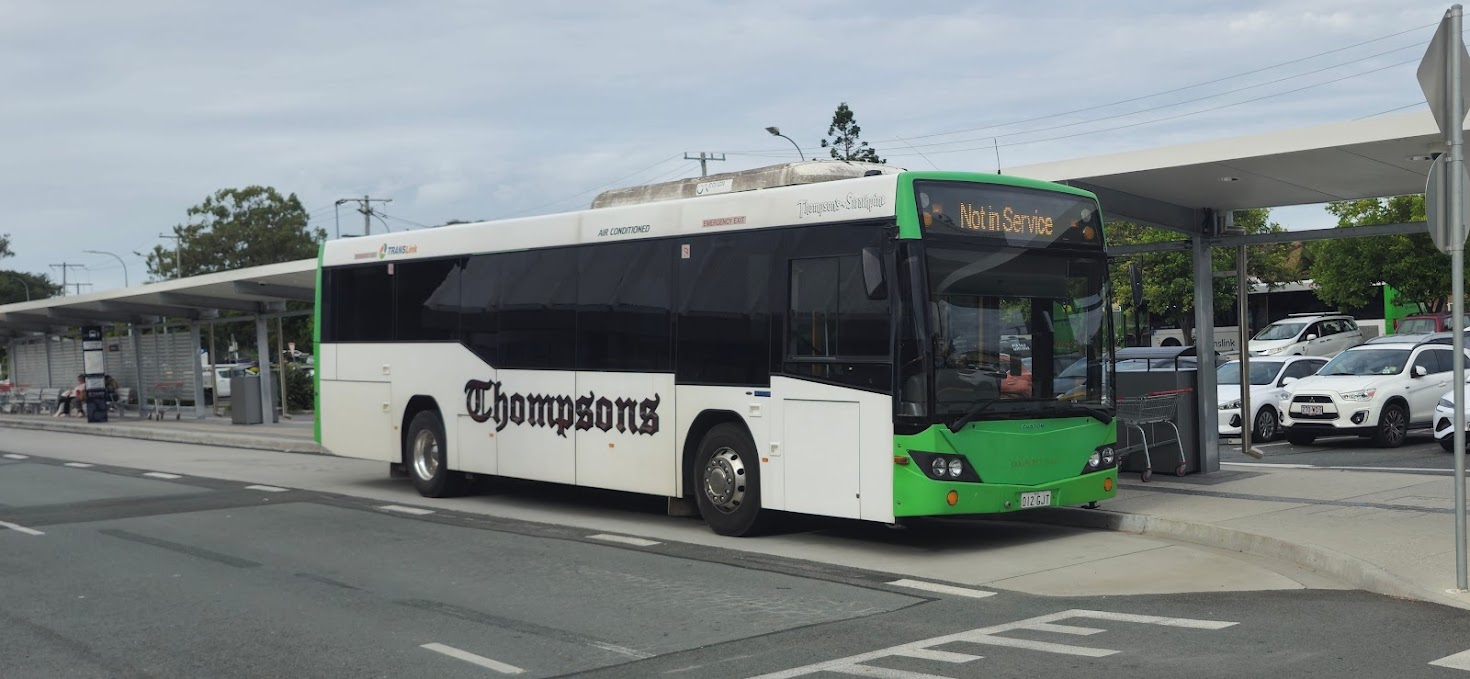
- Founded: 1979
- Headquarters: Joyner
- Service area: North Brisbane
- Service type: Bus & coach operator
- Routes: 8
- Hubs: Strathpine Centre
- Stations: Lawnton; North Lakes; Strathpine
- Depots: Joyner; Brendale
- Fleet: ~101 (October 2024)
- Website: www.thompsonbusservices.com.au

Thompsons Bus Service is an Australian operator of bus services in the northern suburbs of Brisbane. It operates eight services under contract to the Queensland Government under the Translink banner.

== History ==
On 1 September 1979 Geoff Thompson purchased Lawnton Bus Service from Neville Story. On 15 January 1990 Pine River Bus Service was purchased from Lourie Fischer on 15 January 1990, with the combined business renamed Thompson's.

== Routes ==
Route	From	To	Via
669	Warner	Strathpine Centre	Lawnton station & Bray Park station
670	Strathpine Centre	Warner	Bray Park High School
671	Strathpine Centre	Warner	Bray Park & Bray Park station
672	Strathpine Centre	Warner Lakes	Bray Park station, Bray Park & Warner
673	Strathpine Centre	Joyner	Bray Park & Bray Park station
674	Strathpine Centre	Warner	Lawnton, Lawnton station & Strathpine
676	Murrumba Downs	North Lakes	Kallangur station
679	Murrumba Downs	North Lakes	Griffin & Murrumba Downs station

== Fleet ==
As at December 2022, the fleet consists of 73 buses and coaches. A long time Leyland purchaser, since 2006 it has purchased Denning Manufacturing buses.
