= Gympie Road =

Road in Brisbane, Australia

Coordinates: 27°23′44.80″S 153°01′51.72″E

Gympie Road Queensland
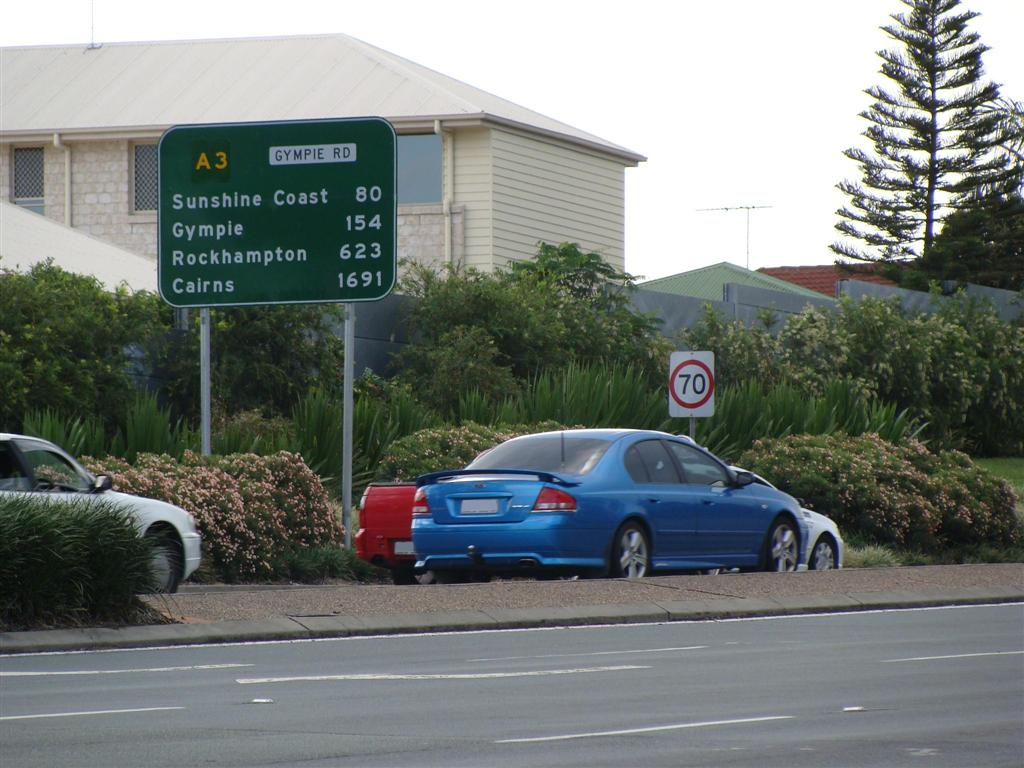

General information
- Type: Road
- Length: 19 km (12 mi)
- Route number(s): A3; (Lutwyche to Bald Hills); State Route 58; (Bald Hills to Petrie)

Major junctions
- SE end: Lutwyche Road, Lutwyche, Queensland
- Gympie Arterial Road
- NW end: Dayboro Road, Petrie, Queensland

Location(s)
- Major suburbs: Kedron, Chermside, Aspley, Strathpine

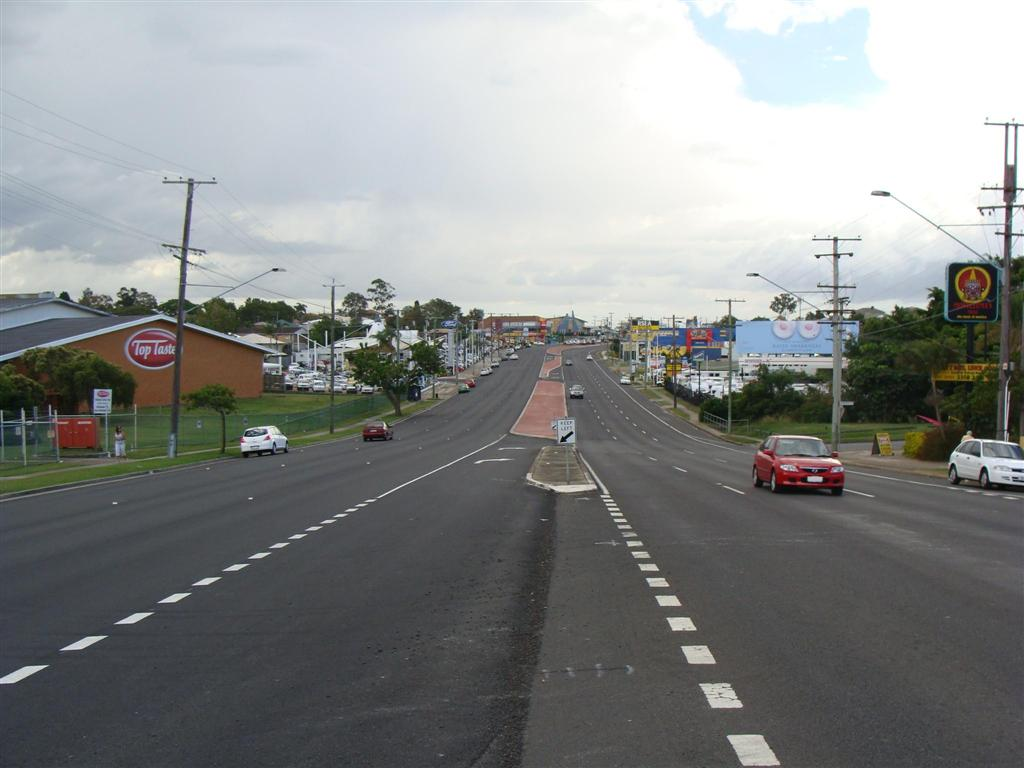
Gympie Road, Kedron 2008

Gympie Road is a major road in the northern suburbs of Brisbane, Queensland, Australia. The road forms part of the main road route from the Brisbane central business district to the northern suburbs and Sunshine Coast.

Gympie Road is designated A3 from Lutwyche Road, Kedron to the Gympie Arterial Road, Bald Hills. The road then continues as State Route 58 to Dayboro Road, Petrie, in the City of Moreton Bay.

Gympie Road is named after the town of Gympie

== Landmarks ==
Gympie Road is lined with many shops, fast food outlets, restaurants, car yards, factories, motels, caravan parks, parks and schools including:

- Kedron Park Hotel (est. 1881)
- Kedron Brook
- Lutwyche Cemetery (est. 1878)
- Top Taste
- Edinburgh Castle Hotel (est. 1868)
- Westfield Chermside
- Marchant Park
- Bunnings
- Bald Hills Primary School
- St Paul's School
- Pine Rivers Park
- Strathpine Centre
- Pine Rivers State High School
- Strathpine Primary School

== History ==
The first private land sale occurred on Gympie Road near Kedron Brook in 1857. Farms, slaughter yards and tanneries were common sights along Gympie Road prior to World War I.

The tram line from the Brisbane central business district was extended to Kedron Park Hotel in 1914, Lutwyche Cemetery in 1925 and Chermside in 1947. The tram service was closed in 1968 and replaced with diesel buses.

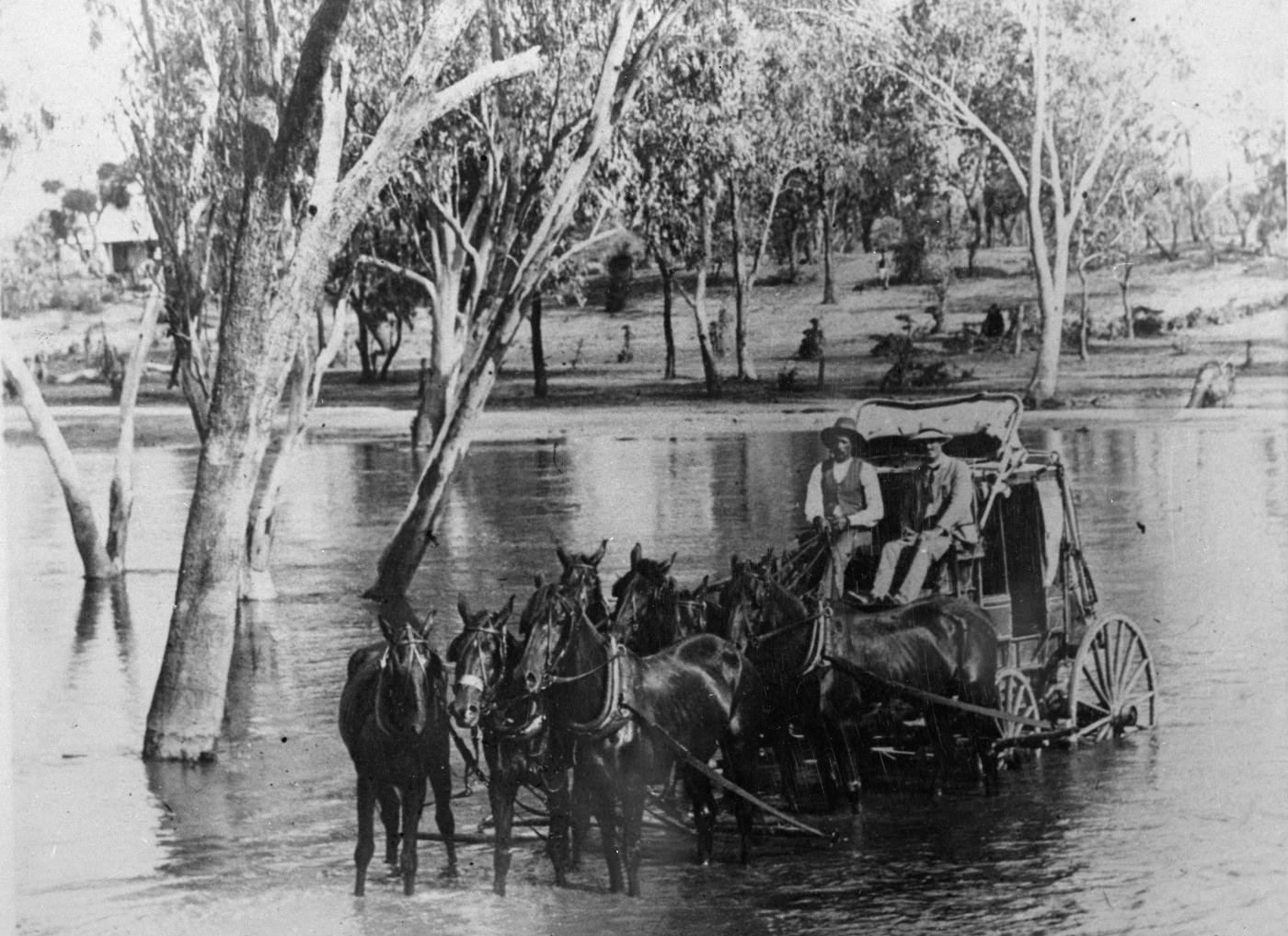
Cobb and Co coach on Old Gympie Road, crossing Fresh Water Creek, Kallangur, 1890s

In 1922, there was a proposal to build Anzac Avenue as a memorial to those who died in World War I. The memorial avenue was to run from the Brisbane central business district to Redcliffe (which, at that time, was not connected to Brisbane by road, only by sea). This proposal would use and rename Gympie Road for the northward part of the route and then extend it eastwards towards Redcliffe. However, in its final form, Anzac Avenue commenced at Petrie rather than Brisbane and so Gympie Road was only renamed from Petrie onwards (which is why Gympie Road terminates at Petrie today). The first segment of Anzac Avenue from Petrie to Kallangur was formerly Gympie Road. However, at Kallangur, Anzac Avenue left Gympie Road to go east, leaving parts of Gympie Road going north through Kallangur to Burpengary disconnected (as a name) from the Brisbane-to-Petrie section. The segment from Kallangur to Burpengary was later renamed Old Gympie Road.

The first integrated shopping mall in Queensland opened on the corner of Gympie Road and Hamilton Road, Chermside in 1957. Originally called the Chermside Drive-in Shopping Centre, it has extended on many occasions and is now Westfield Chermside.

The route was formerly part of the Bruce Highway and carried the designation National Route 1 until the Gateway Bridge opened in 1986. Since then, the route has had the designations of Alt Route 1 and Metroad 3.

== Future ==
Translink is planning for a new section of the Northern Busway from Kedron to Bracken Ridge that will generally follow Gympie Road.

== Interfaces with Airport Link tunnel ==
Gympie Road has the following interfaces with the Airport Link tunnel:

- Northbound carriageway – traffic from either direction exiting the Airport Link can enter Gympie Road about 650 metres north of its southern end.
- Southbound carriageway – traffic wishing to proceed in either direction on Airport Link can exit Gympie Road about 500 metres from its southern end.
- Southern end (intersection with Kedron Park Road) – traffic proceeding north from Lutwyche Road and wishing to travel east on Airport Link can cross the southbound carriageway under traffic light control and exit Gympie Road at its southern end.

== Upgrade ==
A project to upgrade the intersection with Anzac Avenue and Dayboro Road at Petrie, at a cost of $30 million, was completed in March 2022.

== Major intersections ==
LGA	Location	km	mi	Destinations	Notes
Brisbane	Kedron	0	0.0	Lutwyche Road (State Route A3) south – Lutwyche / Kedron Park Road – east – Wooloowin / Airport Link (State Route M7) east – Hendra, Brisbane Airport	Southern end of Gympie Road (A3); Traffic proceeding north from Lutwyche Road and wishing to travel east on Airport Link can cross the southbound carriageway of Gympie Road under traffic light control and exit at this intersection.
Kedron Brook		0.2	0.12	Bridge (no known official name)	
Brisbane	Kedron	0.4	0.25	Stafford Road (Metroad 5) west – Stafford	This is a grade-separated intersection.
Brisbane	Kedron	0.5	0.31	Airport Link (State Route M7) east – Hendra, Brisbane Airport / south – Windsor, Bowen Hills	Traffic proceeding south on Gympie Road and wishing to travel in either direction on Airport Link can exit Gympie Road at this point.
Brisbane	Kedron	0.6	0.37	Airport Link (State Route M7)	Traffic from either direction exiting the Airport Link can enter the northbound carriageway of Gympie Road at this point.
Brisbane	Kedron	1.7	1.1	Edinburgh Castle Road – east – Wavell Heights	
Brisbane	Kedron	1.9	1.2	Kitchener Road – west – Stafford Heights	
Brisbane	Chermside	2.6	1.6	Rode Road – west – Chermside West / east – Wavell Heights	
Brisbane	Chermside	3.5	2.2	Hamilton Road – west – Chermside West / east – Wavell Heights	
Downfall Creek		4.1	2.5	Bridge (no known official name)	
Brisbane	Chermside–Aspley boundary	4.2	2.6	Murphy Road – north–east – Zillmere	Intersection is on the boundary between Chermside and Aspley, which follows the centre line of Gympie Road to the north-west and that of Murphy Road to the north-east.
Brisbane	Chermside–Aspley boundary	5.1	3.2	Webster Road (State Route 27) south – Chermside West / Ellison Road (State Route 27) east – Geebung	Intersection is on the boundary between Chermside and Aspley, which follows the centre line of Gympie Road to the south-east and that of Webster Road to the south.
Brisbane	Aspley	6.4	4.0	Albany Creek Road (State Route 28) west – Bridgeman Downs, Albany Creek / Robinson Road West (State Route 28) east – Geebung	
Brisbane	Aspley	7.3	4.5	Zillmere Road – east – Zillmere	
Cabbage Tree Creek (formerly Tighgum Creek)		7.3	4.5	Bridge (no known official name)	
Brisbane	Carseldine	7.4	4.6	Graham Road – west – Bridgeman Downs	
Brisbane	Carseldine	8.5	5.3	Beams Road – west – Bridgeman Downs / east – Fitzgibbon	
Brisbane	Carseldine	9.4	5.8	Gympie Arterial Road (State Route M3) north – Bald Hills	This intersection allows traffic to exit from the northbound carriageway of the highway to the Sunshine Coast, which becomes Gympie Arterial Road, and to continue to follow Gympie Road. There is no access to either side of the highway at this intersection.
Brisbane	Carseldine–Bald Hills boundary	10.2	6.3	Linkfield Road (State Route 40) west – Brendale / east – Bracken Ridge	Intersection is on the boundary between Carseldine and Bald Hills, which follows the centre line of Linkfield Road.
Brisbane	Bald Hills	12.0	7.5	Strathpine Road (State Route 58) east – Bracken Ridge	Gympie Road continues west as State Route 58.
South Pine River		12.2	7.6	Bridge (no known official name)	
Moreton Bay	Strathpine	13.0	8.1	Kremzow Road – south – Brendale	
Moreton Bay	Strathpine	13.5	8.4	South Pine Road (State Route 28) west – Brendale	
Moreton Bay	Strathpine	14.7	9.1	Samsonvale Road – west – Bray Park / Bells Pocket Road – east – Lawnton	
Four Mile Creek		15.3	9.5	Bridge (no known official name)	
Moreton Bay	Lawnton	16.5	10.3	Francis Road – west – Joyner	
Moreton Bay	Lawnton	16.8	10.4	Todds Road – west – Joyner / Lawnton Pocket Road – east – Lawnton	
North Pine River		17.8	11.1	A.J.Wyllie Bridge	
Moreton Bay	Petrie	18.5	11.5	Dayboro Road (State Route 58) west – Whiteside / Anzac Avenue (State Route 71) east – Kallangur	Northern end of Gympie Road.
Incomplete access; Route transition

== See also ==
- List of road routes in Queensland for more details on some of the state routes that intersect with or follow Gympie Road.
