= Bray Park railway station =

Railway station in Queensland, Australia

Bray Park
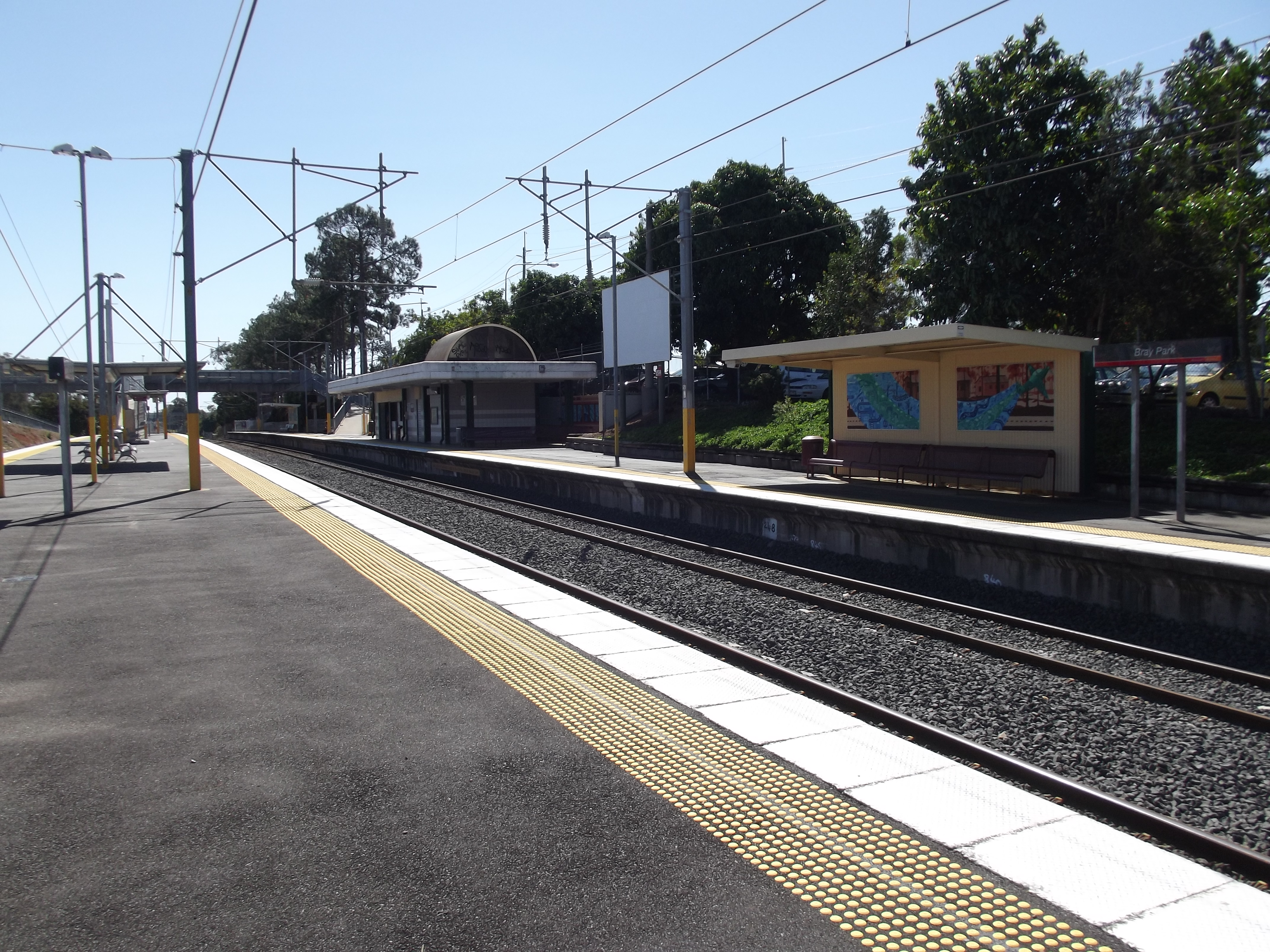
- Northbound view from Platform 2 in August 2012

General information
- Location: Railway Avenue, Strathpine
- Coordinates: 27.2996°S 152.9863°E
- Owner: Queensland Rail
- Operator: Queensland Rail
- Line: Redcliffe Peninsula
- Distance: 23.85 kilometres from Central
- Platforms: 3 (1 side, 1 island)

Construction
- Structure type: Ground
- Parking: 152 bays
- Accessible: Yes

Other information
- Station code: 600458 (platform 1); 600459 (platform 2); 600460 (platform 3)
- Fare zone: Zone 2
- Website: Queensland Rail

History
- Opened: 1986; 40 years ago

Services
Preceding station	Queensland Rail	Following station
Strathpine towards Springfield Central via Roma Street	Redcliffe Peninsula line	Lawnton towards Kippa-Ring
Location

Bray Park is a railway station operated by Queensland Rail on the Redcliffe Peninsula line. It opened in 1986 and serves the Moreton Bay suburbs of Strathpine and Bray Park. It is a ground level station, featuring one island platform with two faces each and one side platform.

== History ==
In September 1985, the Queensland Government provided funding to build Bray Park station in the state budget. The station opened in 1986. In 2001, a third platform opened as part of the addition of a third track from Bald Hills to Lawnton.

== Services ==
Bray Park is served by all Citytrain network services from Kippa-Ring to Central, many continuing to Springfield Central.

== Services by platform ==
Bray Park platform arrangement
Platform	Line	Destinations	Notes
1	Redcliffe Peninsula	Roma Street & Springfield Central	
1	Redcliffe Peninsula	Ipswich	1 weekday afternoon service only
2	Redcliffe Peninsula	Kippa-Ring	Evening peak only
3	Redcliffe Peninsula	Kippa-Ring	

== Transport links ==
Thompsons Bus Service operate four bus routes via Bray Park station:

- 671: Westfield Strathpine to Warner
- 672: Westfield Strathpine to Warners Lake
- 673: Westfield Strathpine to Joyner
- 674: Westfield Strathpine to Warner Village
