= Lawnton =

Lawnton may refer to:

- Lawnton, Queensland, a suburb of the Moreton Bay Region of South East Queensland, Australia
  - Lawnton railway station
- Lawnton, Pennsylvania
