= John Kenrick (theatre writer) =

American theatre historian (born 1959)

John Kenrick (born October 3, 1959) is an American author, teacher and theatre and film historian. Kenrick is an adjunct teacher of musical theatre history at New York University, Brind School – University of the Arts (Philadelphia) and The New School, and lectures frequently on the subject elsewhere. His 2008 book Musical Theatre: A History is a comprehensive history of musical theatre from ancient times to the present. Kenrick is the curator of the extensive musical theatre and film website Musicals101.com: The Cyber Encyclopedia of Musical Theatre, TV and Film

== Life and career ==
Kenrick was born and raised in Astoria, New York. He attended Monsignor McClancy Memorial High School and then Cathedral College of the Immaculate Conception in Douglaston, New York, studying English and theology.

In the 1980s and 1990s, Kenrick worked first as a teacher and then in theatrical production and management. Productions on which he worked included the 1994 Broadway revival of Grease and the original 1996 Broadway production of Rent, as well as national tours of Damn Yankees, Crazy for You, Victor/Victoria, Jekyll & Hyde, and the original 1995 touring production of Busker Alley. He wrote the lyrics for the Off-Broadway musical Bats and has written material for various cabaret and comedy acts. He served as associate producer for the Celebration '86 Gay Arts Festival.

Kenrick teaches musical theatre history at New York University's Steinhardt School, The Ira Brind School – University of the Arts (Philadelphia) and The New School, and he has also taught the subject at Marymount Manhattan College. He is a frequent lecturer on theatre and film history. Broadway World calls him an "Internationally recognized musical theatre and film authority". He is often cited as an expert in the press. Kenrick has been interviewed about theatre and film on numerous US and UK television and radio programs and in national and foreign newspapers and magazines. He has been interviewed in documentaries concerning showtunes, Jerry Herman, Times Square, haunted theatres, and the history of American burlesque, and he appears in the DVD documentaries for The Busby Berkeley Collection and for the film musicals Three Little Words, Till the Clouds Roll By and It's Always Fair Weather. Among other lecture series, from 2005 to 2007, he gave a three-year "musical conversation" series at York Theatre Company. Kenrick has appeared in several documentaries about musicals.

Kenrick is the curator of the extensive musical theatre and film website Musicals101.com: The Cyber Encyclopedia of Musical Theatre, TV and Film. Hundreds of libraries, universities and arts sites link to Musicals101.com.

== Writings ==
- "Theatre in New York: A Brief History", Theatre Law: Cases and Materials, Durham, NC: Carolina Academic Press (2004)
- The Complete Idiot's Guide to Amateur Theatricals, Alpha (2006) ISBN 1-59257-506-4
- Musical Theatre: A History Continuum (2008) ISBN 0-8264-3013-9
- "Funny Girl Debunked: The Truth About Fanny Brice", Barbra Streisand Archives
- The Cambridge Companion to Operetta, Cambridge University Press (2019), Chapter 1: "French Operetta: Offenbach and Company" ISBN 9781316856024

== Documentaries ==
- The 100 Greatest Musicals (2003) (Television)
- Busby Berkeley's Kaleidoscopic Eyes (2006) (film)
- Footlight Parade: Music for the Decades (2006) (V)
- Hollywood Singing and Dancing: A Musical History (2008) (V)
- Hollywood Singing and Dancing: A Musical Treasure (2008) (TV)
- Hollywood Singing and Dancing: 1920s – The Dawn of the Hollywood Musical (2008) (V)
