= South Pine Sports Complex =

Sport and leisure centre in Queensland, Australia

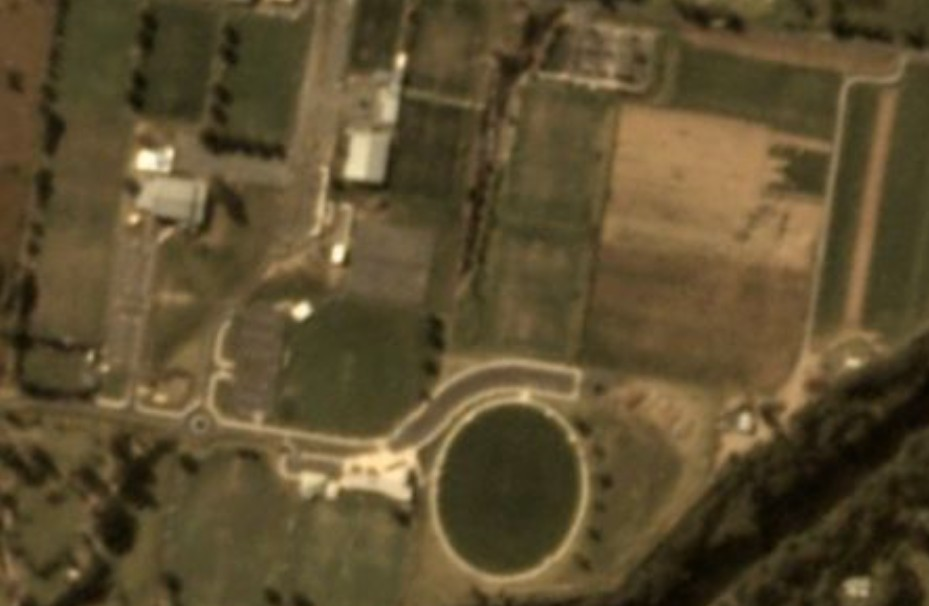
- Interactive map of South Pine Sports Complex
- Location: Brendale, Queensland
- Coordinates: 27.33538°S 152.965743°E
- Operator: South Pine Sports Association
- Capacity: 3,000

Construction
- Opened: 2016; 10 years ago

Tenants
- Brisbane Lions, NEAFL; Brisbane Lions, AFL Women's (2017–2018)

South Pine Sports Complex is a sport and leisure centre in Brendale, a suburb of the City of Moreton Bay, Queensland, Australia.

It was the primary home ground for the Brisbane Lions in the AFL Women's competition during the 2017 and 2018 seasons. On 18 February 2017, it hosted its first AFL Women's game, between Brisbane and Collingwood. No games were fixtured at the venue for the 2019 season, with most being moved to Moreton Bay Central Sports Complex. It has also served as a home ground for the club's reserves team in the NEAFL and VFL. The South Pine Sports Complex has also hosted the Queensland Murri Carnival. In 2024, it was the venue for the Wheelchair State Challenge.
