= Strathpine railway station =

Railway station in Queensland, Australia

Strathpine
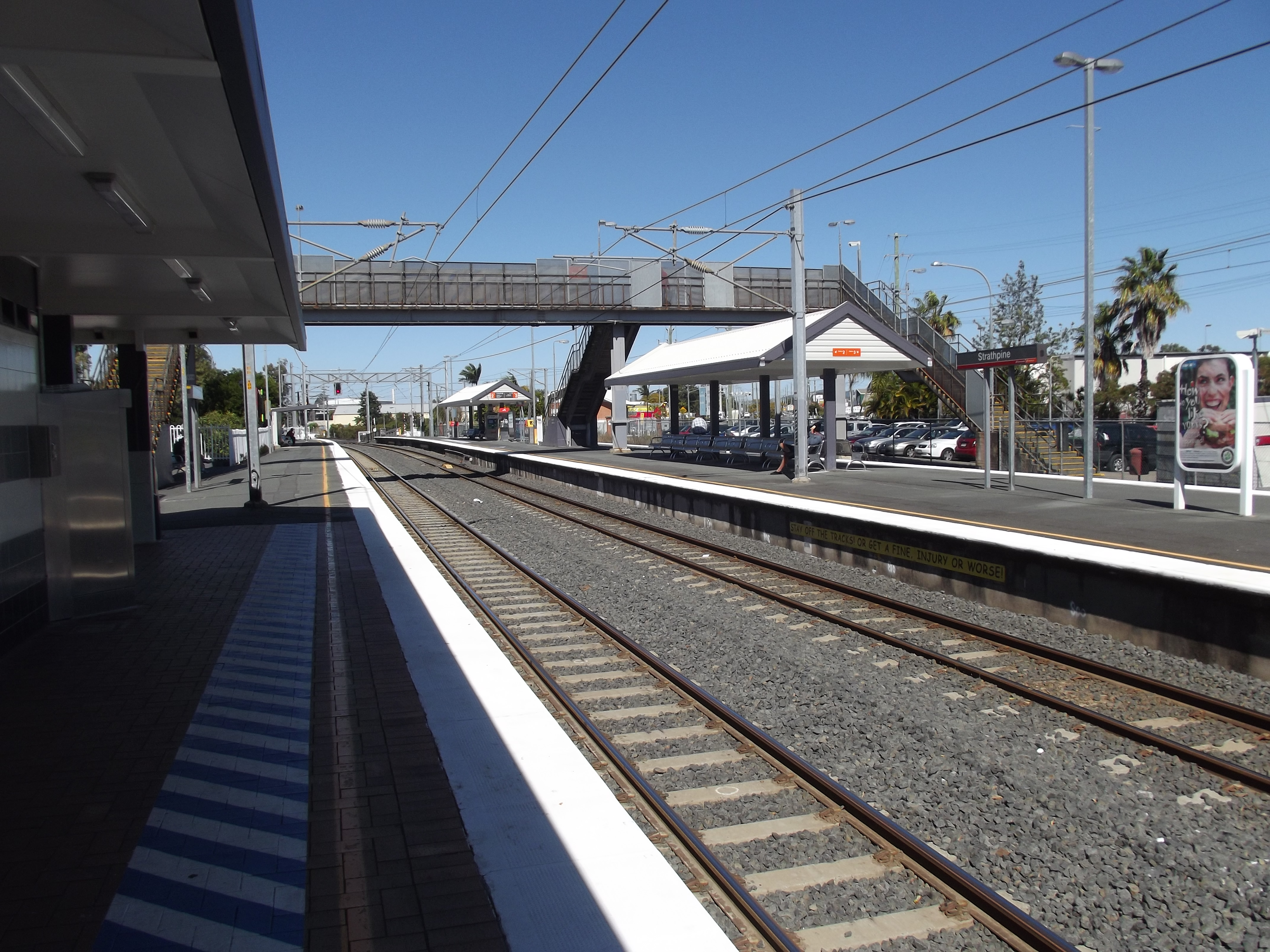
- Southbound view from Platform 1 in August 2012

General information
- Location: Station Street, Strathpine
- Coordinates: 27.3110°S 152.9896°E
- Owner: Queensland Rail
- Operator: Queensland Rail
- Line: Redcliffe Peninsula
- Distance: 22.47 kilometres from Central
- Platforms: 3 (1 side, 1 island)

Construction
- Structure type: Ground
- Parking: 398 bays
- Accessible: Yes

Other information
- Status: Staffed
- Station code: 600455 (platform 1); 600456 (platform 2); 600457 (platform 3)
- Fare zone: Zone 2
- Website: Queensland Rail

History
- Opened: 1888; 138 years ago

Services
Preceding station	Queensland Rail	Following station
Bald Hills towards Springfield Central via Roma Street	Redcliffe Peninsula line	Bray Park towards Kippa-Ring
Location

Strathpine is a railway station operated by Queensland Rail on the Redcliffe Peninsula line. It opened in 1888 and serves the Moreton Bay suburb of Strathpine. It is a ground level station, featuring one island platforms with two faces each and one side platform.

== History ==
In 2001, a third platform opened as part of the addition of a third track from Bald Hills to Lawnton.

== Services ==
Strathpine is served by all Citytrain network services from Kippa-Ring to Roma Street, many continuing to Springfield Central.

== Services by platform ==
Strathpine platform arrangement
Platform	Line	Destinations	Notes
1	Redcliffe Peninsula	Roma Street & Springfield Central	
1	Redcliffe Peninsula	Ipswich	1 weekday afternoon service only
2	Redcliffe Peninsula	Kippa-Ring	Evening peak only
3	Redcliffe Peninsula	Kippa-Ring	

== Transport links ==
Thompsons Bus Service operates one bus route via Strathpine station:

- 670: Strathpine Centre to Warner
