= Brendale, Queensland =

Brendale
- Suburb
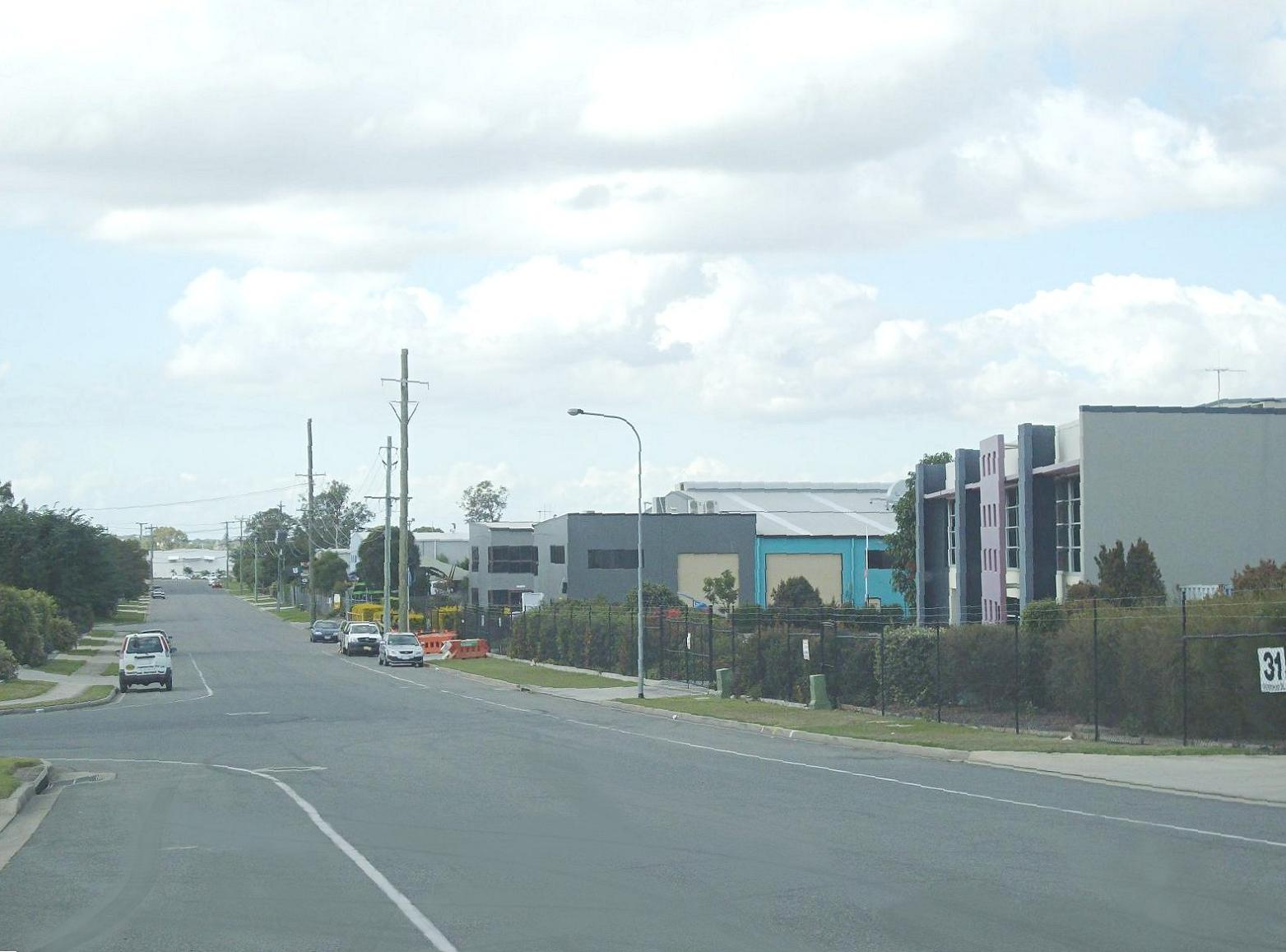
- Strathwyn Street, Brendale, 2008

- Interactive map of Brendale
- Coordinates: 27.3238°S 152.9813°E
- Country: Australia
- State: Queensland
- LGA: City of Moreton Bay
- Location: 3.8 km (2.4 mi) SSW of Strathpine; 22.9 km (14.2 mi) N of Brisbane CBD

Government
  - State electorate: Pine Rivers
  - Federal division: Dickson

Area
  - Total: 10.7 km^{2} (4.1 sq mi)

Population
  - Total: 3,100 (2021 census)
  - Density: 290/km^{2} (750/sq mi)
- Time zone: UTC+10:00 (AEST)
- Postcode: 4500
Suburbs around Brendale
Warner	Strathpine	Strathpine
Warner	Brendale	Bald Hills
Eatons Hill	Albany Creek	Bridgeman Downs

Brendale is a suburb in the City of Moreton Bay, Queensland, Australia. In the 2021 census, Brendale had a population of 3,100 people.

== Geography ==
Brendale is north of Brisbane, the state capital, and located immediately south of Strathpine on the South Pine River.

Brendale is mostly an industrial suburb, although several parks exist within it. It contains a Powerlink 275/110 kV electrical transmission substation called South Pine Substation with two grid batteries, as well as a waste treatment plant.

== History ==
Brendale is situated in the Yugarabul traditional Indigenous Australian country.

The suburb's name originates from the name given to a horse stud, established by the property developer, property marketer and business owner William (Bill) Bowden in the early 1960s. According to Moreton Bay Library, Brendale is a corruption of Brentdale, a property in Northern Ireland owned by the Davis/Davison family, who were early settlers of the Brendale region.

Wantima Country Club opened on 14 February 1969 with a 6-hole golf course.

== Demographics ==
In the 2011 census, Brendale recorded a population of 1,847 people, 51% female and 49% male. The median age of the Brendale population was 34 years, 3 years below the national median of 37. 65.3% of people living in Brendale were born in Australia. The other top responses for country of birth were New Zealand 10%, India 3.8%, England 3.5%, Philippines 1.5%, Fiji 0.9%. 83% of people spoke only English at home; the next most common languages were 1.8% Punjabi, 0.9% Tagalog, 0.9% Hindi, 0.8% Shona, 0.8% Japanese.

In the 2016 census, Brendale had a population of 2,758 people.

In the 2021 census, Brendale had a population of 3,100 people.

== Amenities ==
Brendale is an industrial, light industrial, commercial, business, retail, service centre, distribution centre and international business park in the Strathpine area for the north metropolitan Brisbane and wider communities. The Bunya Park Drive Convenience Centre, containing the Eatons Hill Hotel and Function Centre in Brendale is a trade, enterprise, retail and services zone providing services for the neighbouring Albany Creek, Eatons Hill and wider communities.

=== Sporting facilities ===
The South Pine Sports Complex has sporting facilities for a wide array of sports.

Wantima Country Club has an 18-hole golf course. It is where Cameron Smith, winner of the 150th British Open learned to play.

== Education ==
There are no schools in Brendale. The nearest government primary schools are Strathpine West State School in neighbouring Strathpine to the north, Bald Hills State School in neighouring Bald Hills to the east, and Eatons Hill State School in neighbouring Eatons Hill to the south-west. The nearest government secondary schools are Pine Rivers State High School in Strathpine to the north-east, Albany Creek State High School in neighbouring Albany Creek to the south, and Bray Park State High School in Bray Park to the north-west.

== Transport ==
The nearest train station is Strathpine railway station in the adjacent suburb of Strathpine.
