= Joyner, Queensland =

Joyner
- Suburb
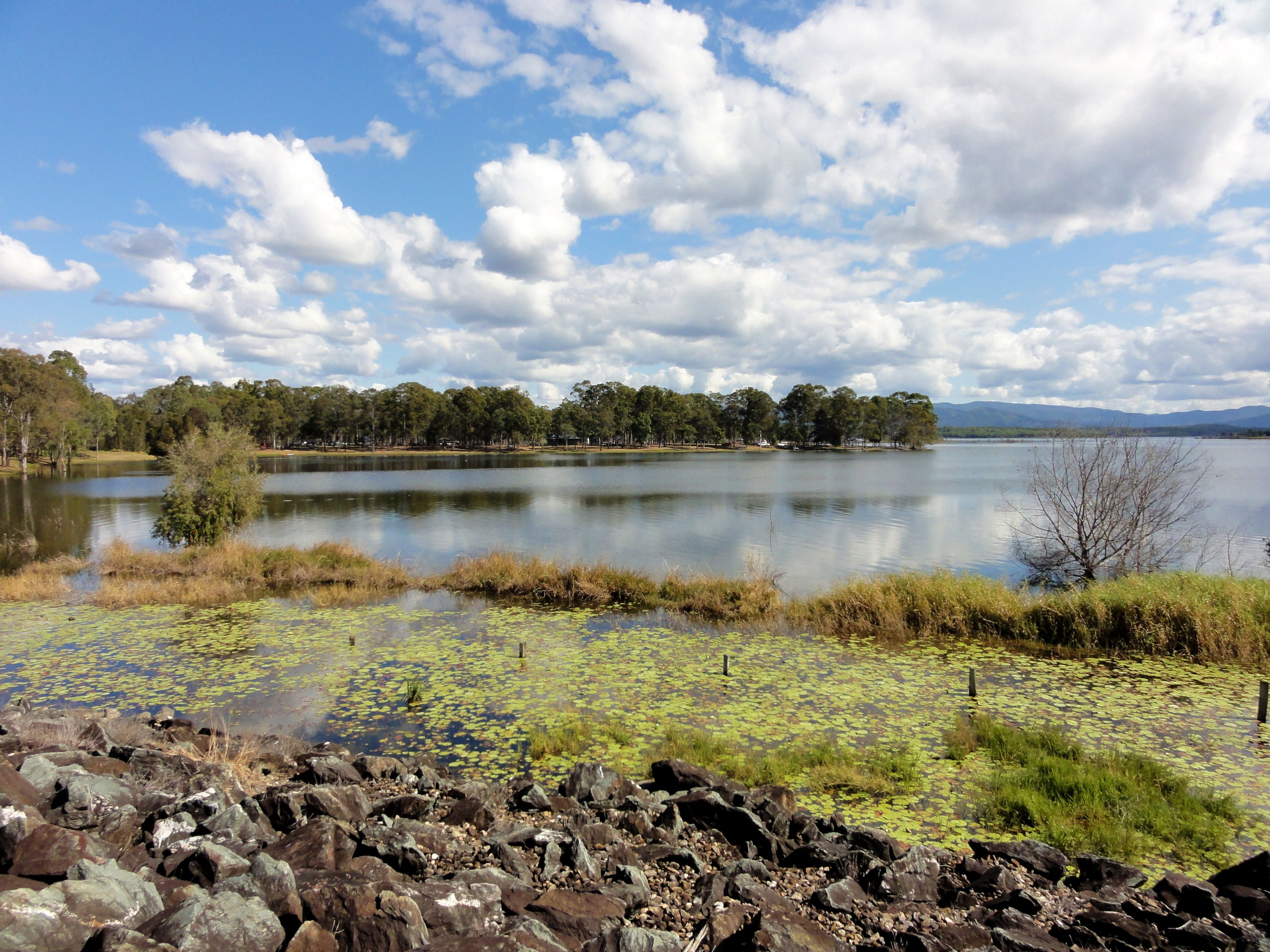
- Lake Samsonvale at Joyner, 2011

- Interactive map of Joyner
- Coordinates: 27.2741°S 152.9383°E
- Country: Australia
- State: Queensland
- City: Moreton Bay
- LGA: City of Moreton Bay
- Location: 6.1 km (3.8 mi) NW of Strathpine; 26.4 km (16.4 mi) N of Brisbane CBD

Government
  - State electorate: Kurwongbah
  - Federal division: Dickson

Area
  - Total: 8.0 km^{2} (3.1 sq mi)

Population
  - Total: 3,600 (2021 census)
  - Density: 450/km^{2} (1,165/sq mi)
- Time zone: UTC+10:00 (AEST)
- Postcode: 4500
Suburbs around Joyner
Whiteside	Whiteside	Petrie
Cashmere	Joyner	Lawnton
Cashmere	Warner	Bray Park

Joyner is a suburb in the City of Moreton Bay, Queensland, Australia. It is part of the Brisbane metropolitan area. In the 2021 census, Joyner had a population of 3,600 people.

== Geography ==
The eastern part of Lake Samsonvale is within the locality of Joyner.

The Joyner area may be considered one of the numerous sub-catchments of the North Pine River drainage basin. This basin extends from the western ranges all the way to Moreton Bay.

== History ==
The origin of the name Joyner is from the Joyner family, early settlers in the area. William Joyner established the pastoral station “Samson Vale” in 1845.

== Demographics ==
In the 2011 census, Joyner had a population of 2,769 people, 48.8% female and 51.2% male. The median age of the Joyner population was 34 years, 3 years below the national median of 37. Of people living in Joyner, 78.7% were born in Australia. The other top responses for country of birth were New Zealand (5.1%), England (4.1%), South Africa (2.69%), Ireland (0.4%), and Fiji (0.4%). Of the people 92% spoke only English at home; the next most common languages were Afrikaans (0.8%), Hindi (0.4%), Spanish (0.4%), Samoan, and Italian (0.3%).

In the 2016 census, Joyner had a population of 2,833 people.

In the 2021 census, Joyner had a population of 3,600 people.

== Economy ==
The most notable feature of the area is the North Pine Dam and Treatment Plant which supplies a significant volume of potable water to the City of Moreton Bay and City of Brisbane, utilising water from Lake Samsonvale. The Plant supplies water in the order of 100ML per day.

Joyner is also home to the bus depot of Thompsons Bus Service, which operates bus services mostly in the Pine Rivers District area.

== Education ==
There are no schools in Joyner. The nearest government primary schools are Petrie State School in neighbouring Petrie to the north-east, Lawnton State School in neighbouring Lawnton to the east, and Bray Park State School in neighbouring Bray Park to the south-east. The nearest government secondary school is Bray Park State High School, also in Bray Park.

== Amenities ==
Forgan Road which runs along the eastern shore of Lake Samsonvale, gives access to popular fishing and picnic spots making the area a valuable recreational resource for locals and visitors. Important centres for recreational activities exist at Bullocky Rest and also at Forgan Cove, near the intersection with Samsonvale Road. Forgan Cove has been designated as a zone for paddle craft use by the public on the lake.

Lake Samsonvale is stocked with several native fish species. These facilities have been provided by the South East Queensland Water Board.

One Mile Creek more or less bisects Joyner south-west to north-east and enters the North Pine River south of Nelson Road. Pleasant parks have been established along the creek banks in several areas adding to the amenity of the locality.

Joyner Central, a shopping centre on Youngs Crossing Road, opened in August 2026 and includes a Coles supermarket, retail and dining outlets, and medical and fitness services.

Joyner is also home to a popular YMCA camp, Camp Warrawee, off Byrnes Road North, and bordered by the North Pine River on the northern and western sides. The camp has been established for many decades and utilises the river for many recreational and youth development activities such as canoeing. The Camp has accommodation for 232.

At the confluence of North Pine River and Sideling Creek off Youngs Crossing Road, a large sand bank forms the basis for a popular swimming and fishing area. This natural feature has been enhanced with facilities provided by Moreton Bay City Council.
