= Genesis Christian College =

Location
- 12–16 Youngs Crossing Road; Bray Park, Queensland; Australia; 27.287864°S 152.953709°E

Information
- Type: Independent, co-educational
- Denomination: Reformed
- Established: 1991
- School code: 5592
- Houses: Bethel, Shiloh, Gilead, Jericho
- Website: www.genesis.qld.edu.au

Genesis Christian College is an independent school (Nursery–12) located at Bray Park, Brisbane, Australia. The college was established in 1991 by members of the Reformed Church. It is affiliated with Oasis church.

== History ==
In 1978, a group of committed Christians from the Reformed Church of Stafford (later to be known as Bray Park Community Church) shared a vision to build a Christian school. As a result, the North Brisbane Christian Schools Association (NBCSA) was formed to elect representatives (Board Members) who would oversee and govern the College in its administration, education, finance and development.

In 1989, land used as an equestrian training ground was purchased at Youngs Crossing Road, Bray Park. This was made possible through much prayer and fundraising. The Stafford Church was sold and the present Bray Park Community Church was built.

Genesis Christian College opened in 1991 with thirty-five Year 1 to 7 students who were temporarily schooled in two demountables until they were able to move into the newly built church. Bob Van Veen, the founding Principal and Jane Nyhouse (now Eyles) were the first teachers. Over the ensuing years, the Primary School was built.

Lynne Doneley was appointed as Principal in January 1996 when Van Veen retired. In 1998 the Secondary School began with thirteen students and its first Year 12 cohort graduated in 2002.

Mid 2007, Brian Barker was appointed as Principal when Doneley took up a position as Queensland Executive Officer for Christian Schools Australia. During that year, an architecturally designed library was opened, followed by the Administration Building in 2008 which centralized the business and managerial areas of the College. An Early Learning Centre, Little Genesis, was also built and established during 2008.
