= Man of Steel (musical) =

- Music: Ian Dorricott
- Lyrics: Simon Denver

Man of Steel is a musical written by Simon Denver and Ian Dorricott, first published in 1978. Written for performance by schools and drama groups, Man of Steel is based on the story of Superman, with a comedic spin.

== Characters ==
=== Protagonists ===
- Ken Clarke / Man of Steel
- Linda Street
- Bobby Benson
- Rita
- Lil
- Marg
- Fan Club Leader
- Edna
- Gerry Black
- Ruby

=== Antagonists ===
- Bugsy
- Killer
- Knuckles
- Crusher
- Olga
- Apprentice Henchmen

=== Minor ===
- Old Woman
- Fanclub Members
- Policeman

== Musical Numbers ==
- Prelude to Act One (Clap Your Hands for the Man of Steel)
- Bad Girl
- Clap Your Hands for the Man of Steel
- Everybody Needs a Superhero
- I'm Just a Loser
- I've Got the Power
- Landlady Blues
- Man of Steel Fanfare
- Man of Steel, I Really Love You So
- Prelude to Act II (Won't Someone Tell Me?)
- The Man of Steel Fan Club Song
- The Raspberry
- We've Got the News!
- Won't Someone Tell me?
- You're a Gangster
- Exit Music (Man of Steel, I Really Love You So)
