= Warner, Queensland =

Warner
- Suburb
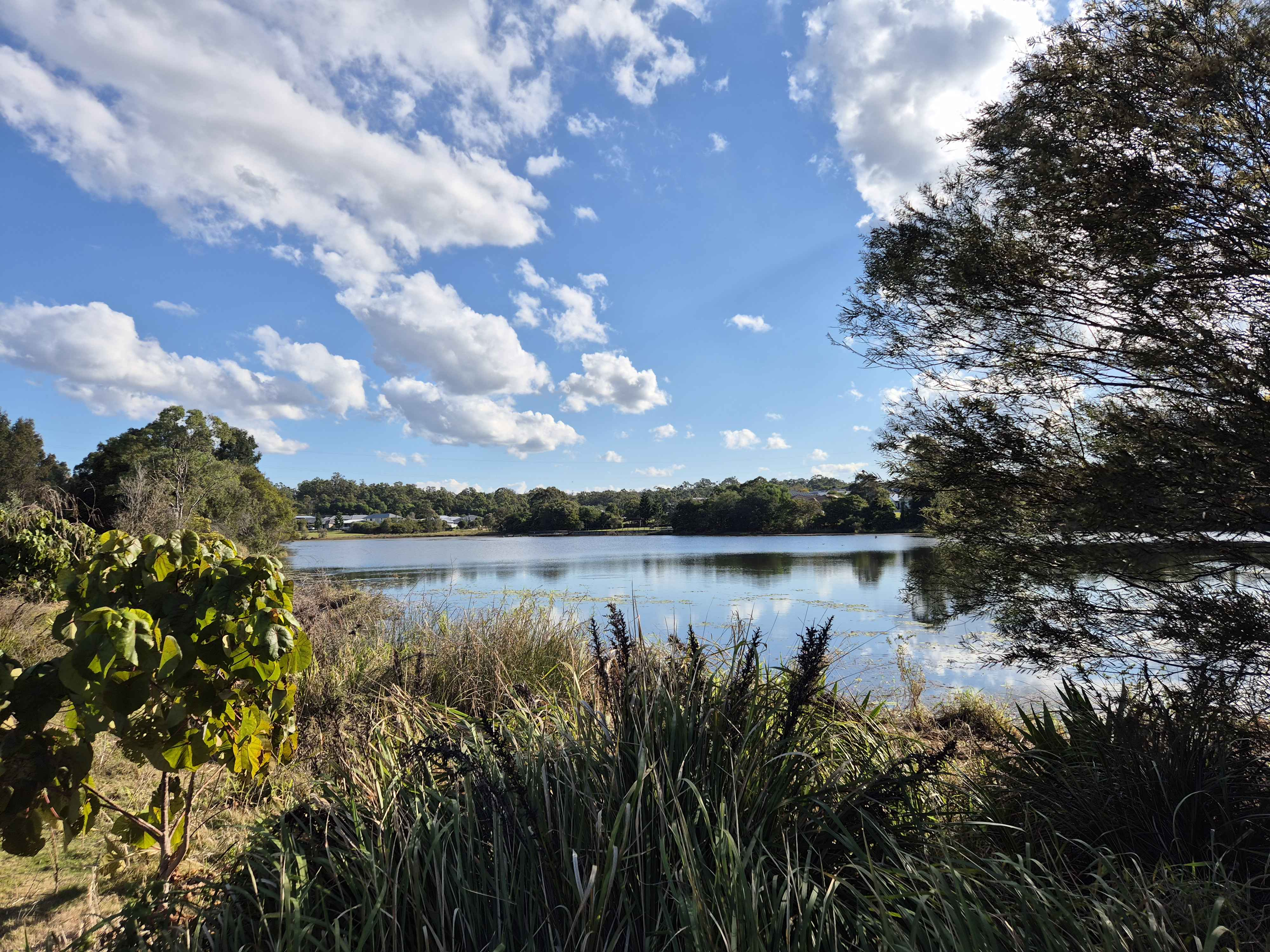
- Warner Lakes, Warner

- Interactive map of Warner
- Coordinates: 27.3130°S 152.9497°E
- Country: Australia
- State: Queensland
- LGA: City of Moreton Bay
- Location: 4.9 km (3.0 mi) W of Strathpine; 24.2 km (15.0 mi) N of Brisbane CBD

Government
  - State electorates: Pine Rivers; Everton
  - Federal division: Dickson

Area
  - Total: 10.6 km^{2} (4.1 sq mi)

Population
  - Total: 12,264 (2021 census)
  - Density: 1,157/km^{2} (2,997/sq mi)
- Time zone: UTC+10:00 (AEST)
- Postcode: 4500
Suburbs around Warner
| Cashmere | Joyner | Bray Park |
| Cashmere | Warner | Strathpine |
| Cashmere | Eatons Hill | Brendale |

Warner is a suburb in the City of Moreton Bay, Queensland, Australia. In the 2021 census, Warner had a population of 12,264 people. Warner is part of the Brisbane metropolitan area.

== Geography ==
Warner is approximately 10.6 square kilometres. Warner is located southeast of Lake Samsonvale and west of the urban localities of Strathpine, Brendale, Bray Park and Lawnton.

== History ==
Warner is named after an early civilian surveyor James Warner.

Warner State School building was completed on Friday 7 April 1876 with delays finding a teacher. It opened in June 1876 with 28 students having enrolled by December 1876. It celebrated its golden jubilee on 25 June 1926. It closed circa 1939. It was on the south-western corner of South Pine Road and Old North Road (now 2 Coorparoo Road, 27.3255°S 152.9623°E).

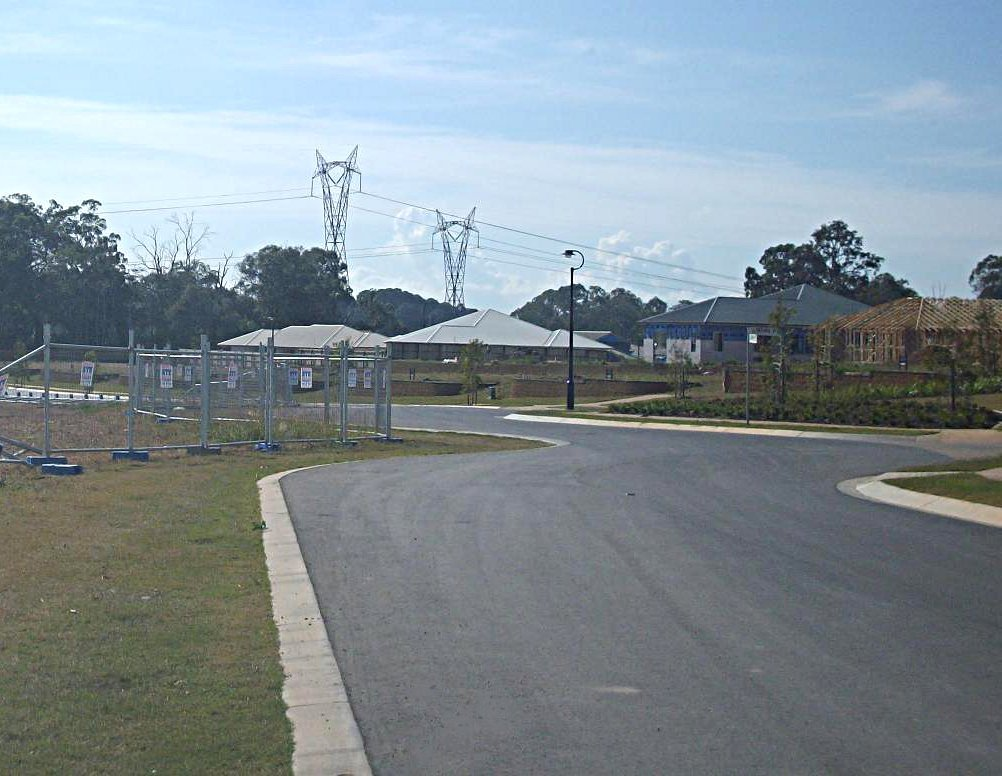
New housing development, 2008

Warner was originally in the west of Strathpine and used for farming potatoes. Suburban housing developments commenced in 1995 with the redevelopment of a former drive-in theatre, south-west of the intersection of Samsonvale and Old North Road, into a housing estate.

In 2005, the Warner Lakes housing estate was established south-west of the intersection of Old North and Kremzow Roads with 1,100 home sites planned.

== Demographics ==
In the 2011 census, Warner recorded a population of 8,381 people, 50.5% female and 49.5% male. The median age of the Warner population was 30 years, 7 years below the national median of 37. 77.1% of people living in Warner were born in Australia. The other top responses for country of birth were New Zealand 4.8%, England 4.6%, South Africa 2.4%, Philippines 1.3%, Fiji 0.9%. 90.6% of people spoke only English at home; the next most common languages were 0.9% Hindi, 0.8% Afrikaans, 0.6% Tagalog, 0.3% Filipino, 0.3% Spanish.

In the 2016 census, Warner had a population of 11,411 people.

In the 2021 census, Warner had a population of 12,264 people.

== Education ==
There are no schools in Warner. The nearest government primary schools are Bray Park State School in neighbouring Bray Park to the north-east, Strathpine West State School in neighbouring Strathpine to the east, and Eatons Hill State School in neighbouring Eatons Hill to the south. The nearest government secondary schools are Bray Park State High School in Bray Park and Albany Creek State High School in Albany Creek to the south-east.

Other schools in surrounding suburbs include:

- Strathpine State School (primary), Strathpine
- Holy Spirit Catholic School (primary), Bray Park
- Genesis Christian College (primary and secondary), Bray Park
- Pine Rivers Special School (primary and secondary), Lawnton
- Pine Rivers State High School (secondary), Strathpine

== Amenities ==
The Moreton Bay Regional Council operates a mobile library service which visits the Pendicup Community Centre on Samsonvale Road.

There are a number of parks in the area, including:

- Banksia Park (27.3290°S 152.9411°E)
- Frank Nichols Reserve (27.3176°S 152.9377°E)
- Hasen Park (27.3154°S 152.9418°E)
- John H Walker Reserve (27.3270°S 152.9473°E)
- John Hill Park (27.3005°S 152.9538°E)
- Justin Somers Reserve (27.3006°S 152.9457°E)
