= Lawnton railway station =

Railway station in Queensland, Australia

Lawnton
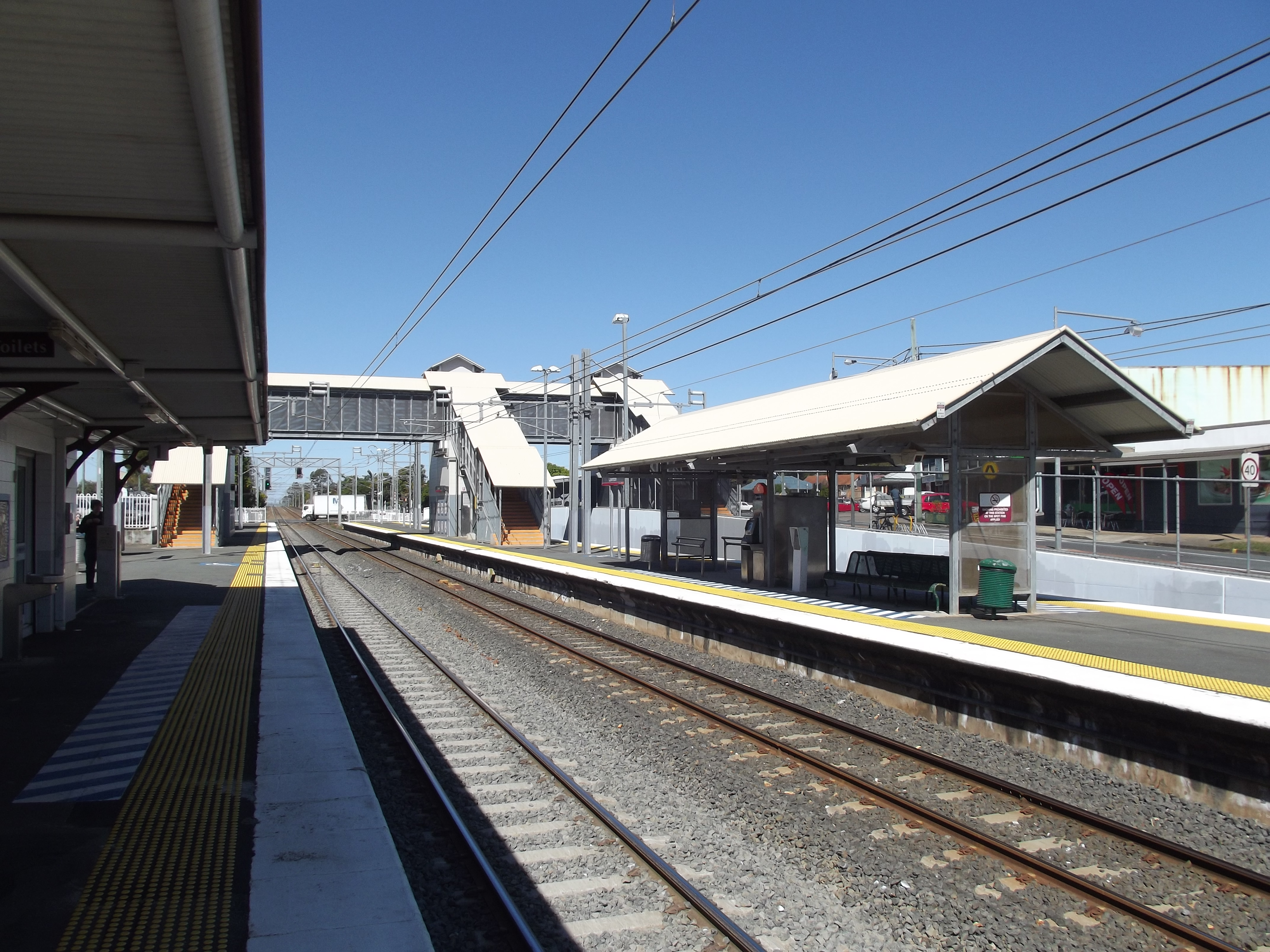
- Southbound view from Platform 1 in August 2012

General information
- Location: Station Road, Lawnton
- Coordinates: 27°16′55″S 152°58′52″E
- Elevation: 14 m (46 ft)
- Owner: Queensland Rail
- Operator: Queensland Rail
- Line: Redcliffe Peninsula
- Distance: 25.89 kilometres from Central
- Platforms: 3 (1 side, 1 island)

Construction
- Structure type: Ground
- Parking: 159
- Accessible: Yes

Other information
- Status: Staffed part-time
- Station code: 600461 (platform 1); 600462 (platform 2); 600463 (platform 3)
- Fare zone: Zone 2/3
- Website: Queensland Rail

History
- Opened: 1888; 138 years ago

Services
Preceding station	Queensland Rail	Following station
Bray Park towards Springfield Central via Roma Street	Redcliffe Peninsula line	Petrie towards Kippa-Ring
Location

Lawnton is a railway station operated by Queensland Rail on the Redcliffe Peninsula line. It opened in 1888 and serves the Moreton Bay suburb of Lawnton. It is a ground level station, featuring one island platforms with two faces each and one side platform.

== History ==
Lawnton station opened in 1888. In 2001, a third platform opened as part of the addition of a third track from Bald Hills to just north of the station.

As part of the Redcliffe Peninsula railway line project, the third track has been extended north to Petrie including a new bridge over the North Pine River.

== Services ==
Lawnton is served by all Citytrain network services from Kippa-Ring to Central, many continuing to Springfield Central

== Services by platform ==
Lawnton platform arrangement
Platform	Line	Destinations	Notes
1	Redcliffe Peninsula	Roma Street & Springfield Central	
1	Redcliffe Peninsula	Ipswich	1 weekday afternoon service only
2	Redcliffe Peninsula	Kippa-Ring	Evening peak only
3	Redcliffe Peninsula	Kippa-Ring	

== Transport links ==
Thompsons Bus Service operates one bus route via Lawnton station:

- 669: Westfield Strathpine to Warner Village
