= Strathpine, Queensland =

Strathpine
- Suburb
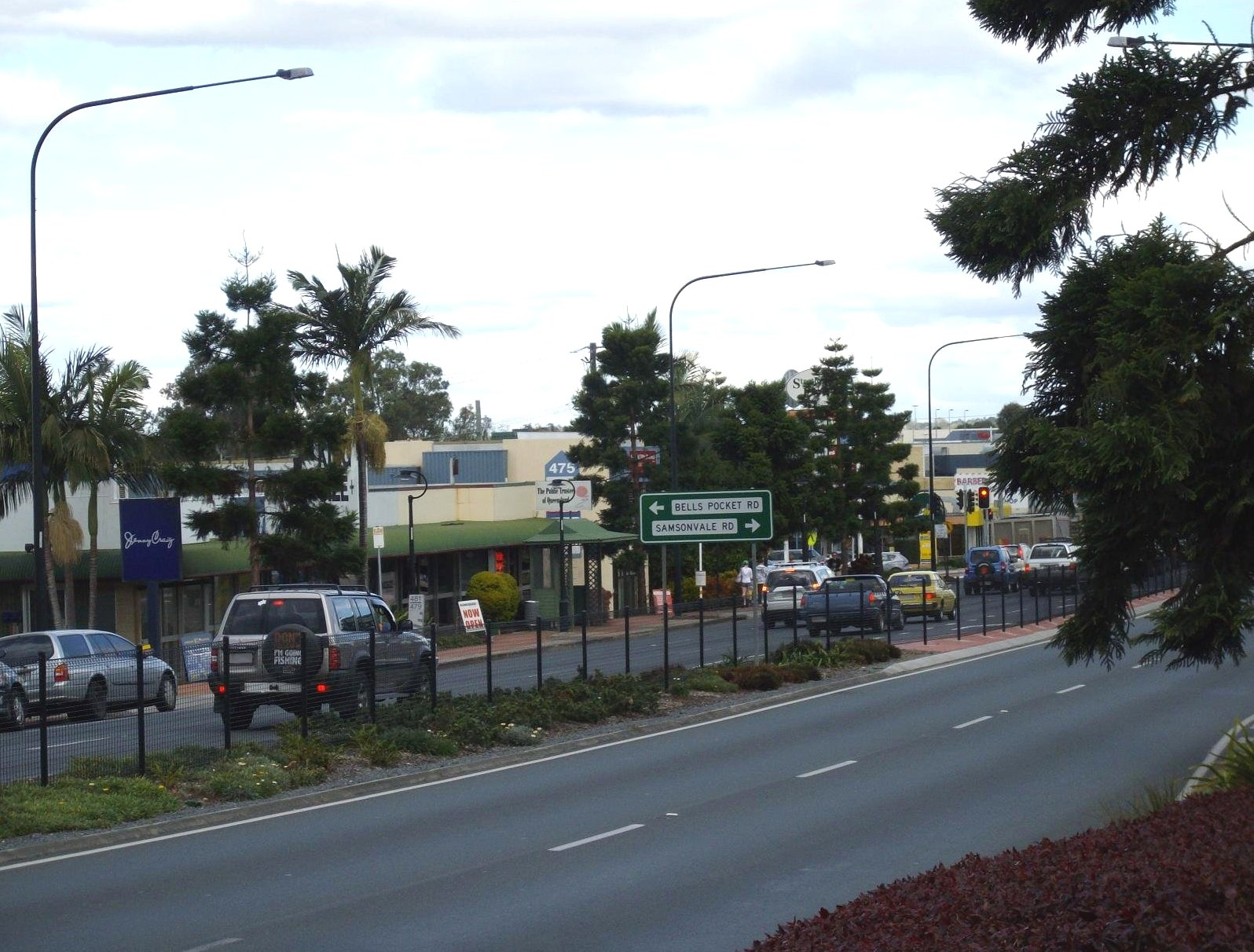
- Gympie Road, Strathpine

- Interactive map of Strathpine
- Coordinates: 27.3019°S 152.9888°E
- Country: Australia
- State: Queensland
- City: City of Moreton Bay
- LGA: City of Moreton Bay
- Location: 21.3 km (13.2 mi) SW of Redcliffe; 34.4 km (21.4 mi) S of Caboolture; 21 km (13 mi) N of Brisbane CBD.
- Established: 1860s

Government
  - State electorates: Aspley; Pine Rivers
  - Federal division: Dickson

Area
  - Total: 7.2 km^{2} (2.8 sq mi)

Population
  - Total: 10,647 (2021 census)
  - Density: 1,479/km^{2} (3,830/sq mi)
- Time zone: UTC+10:00 (AEST)
- Postcode: 4500
Suburbs around Strathpine
Lawnton	Lawnton	Bald Hills
Bray Park	Strathpine	Bald Hills
Brendale	Brendale	Bald Hills

Strathpine is a suburb in the City of Moreton Bay, Queensland, Australia. It is home to the Pine Rivers District offices of the City of Moreton Bay, as well as many businesses, administrative, and local, state and federal government offices. The area is home to Strathpine Centre, a medium-sized urban shopping centre, built by Westfield.

In the 2021 census, Strathpine had a population of 10,647 people. It is part of the Brisbane metropolitan area.

== Geography ==
Gympie Road enters the suburb from the south-east (Bald Hills) and exits to the north (Lawnton). The North Coast railway line runs parallel to and west of Gympie Road. The suburb is served by two railway stations:

- Bray Park railway station (27.2996°S 152.9862°E)
- Strathpine railway station (27.3110°S 152.9895°E)

== History ==
Strathpine is situated in the Yugarabul traditional Indigenous Australian country.

The area now known as Strathpine was originally developed in the 1860s as an addition to the North Pine settlement (now known as Petrie) during the Gympie gold rush. In the late 19th century, the area was known for sugar and rum production, with several sugar mills and distilleries in the area. The area was first named Strathpine by Queensland Railways in the 1880s where Strathpine is a Scottish place name, where strath means valley and pine refers to the Pine River.

From 1889 to 2008, Strathpine was the administrative centre of the Pine Rivers Shire Council (formerly known as the Pine Division and the Shire of Pine). Although Pine Rivers Shire was amalgamated in 2008 into the Moreton Bay Region (known since 2023 as the City of Moreton Bay), council offices are still located in the suburb.

Shortcut Provisional School opened circa 1894 and closed circa 1915.

Strathpine State School opened on 16 January 1911.

The population of the area boomed in the 1940s after the opening of 'Camp Strathpine', a large army camp and airfield which helped both Australian and American forces during World War II. Modern-day Spitfire Avenue occupies the area where one of three airfields constructed in the region during World War II had resided.

Development slowly increased until the 1960s when Brisbane’s rapidly growing population expanded into the area. During the late 1960s and early 1970s, the property developer, property marketer and business owner William (Bill) Bowden marketed and developed numerous estates in the Strathpine area. Bill Bowden's marketing slogan was "Little Aspley - that's Strathpine", a reference to the nearby Brisbane suburb of Aspley. Most of the farms were sold off and the area quickly grew into a residential and commercial hub.

Strathpine State High School opened on 28 January 1964, but on 5 March 1964 was renamed Pine Rivers District State High School, which was later simplified to Pine Rivers State High School.

Strathpine State Infants School was separated from Strathpine State School on 23 January in 1978. It closed on 9 December 1988, reamalgamating with Strathpine State School.

Strathpine West State School opened on 27 January 1981.

Growth continued into the 1980s and Strathpine Centre opened on 22 August 1983, known as Westfield Strathpine until 2015. The Strathpine Library opened in 1990.

A Holden plant existed in Strathpine until transferred to Acacia Ridge in 1966.

== Demographics ==
In the 2011 census, Strathpine had a population of 9,278 people, 49.8% female and 50.2% male. The median age of the Strathpine population was 35 years, 2 years below the national median of 37. 76.7% of people living in Strathpine were born in Australia. The other top responses for country of birth were New Zealand 5.4%, England 3.2%, Philippines 1.1%, Fiji 0.8%, India 0.7%. 87.9% of people spoke only English at home; the next most common languages were 1.1% Samoan, 0.9% Hindi, 0.5% Tagalog, 0.5% Mandarin, 0.3% Filipino.

In the 2016 census, Strathpine had a population of 9,503 people.

In the 2021 census, Strathpine had a population of 10,647 people.

== Heritage listings ==
Strathpine has a number of heritage-listed sites, including:

- 238 Gympie Road (27.3096°S 152.9901°E): former Pine Rivers Shire Hall

== Education ==
Strathpine State School is a government primary (Prep–6) school for boys and girls in Don Court (27.2939°S 152.9902°E). In 2018, the school had an enrolment of 434 students with 32 teachers (29 full-time equivalent) and 24 non-teaching staff (14 full-time equivalent). It includes a special education program.

Strathpine West State School is a government primary (Prep–6) school for boys and girls at 16–20 Garbala Drive (27.3060°S 152.9699°E). In 2018, the school had an enrolment of 534 students with 38 teachers (33 full-time equivalent) and 24 non-teaching staff (17 full-time equivalent). It includes a special education program.

Pine Rivers State High School is a government secondary (7–12) school for boys and girls at 535 Gympie Road (27.2963°S 152.9894°E). In 2018, the school had an enrolment of 1,281 students with 109 teachers (101 full-time equivalent) and 44 non-teaching staff (33 full-time equivalent). It includes a special education program.

== Amenities ==
The Moreton Bay City Council operates a public library at 1 Station Road.

The Pine Rivers Park is at 125 Gympie Road.

== Transport ==
Strathpine has two railway stations: Strathpine railway station in the south of the suburb and Bray Park railway station in the north of the suburb. The train services are on Queensland Rail's Redcliffe Peninsula railway line, with frequent services departing to and arriving from destinations, such as Brisbane, Springfield and Kippa-Ring.

Strathpine bus station at Strathpine Centre has many services frequently departing to and arriving from other suburbs, such as Albany Creek, Redcliffe, Chermside, Toombul Interchange (Nundah) and Warner.
