= Ian Dorricott =

Australian composer

Ian J. Dorricott (born 1949 in Brisbane, Australia) is an Australian composer for school music texts and stage musicals.

Dorricott attended West Bundaberg State School, Bundaberg State High School and the University of Queensland. He earned a B. A. (Hons.)/B. Music and A. Music from the University of Queensland in 1971. His teaching experience includes Yeronga High School, Brisbane Girls Grammar School and St Joseph's College, Gregory Terrace.

== Publications ==
Ian has written and co-written several primary and secondary music texts. His secondary texts are the most widely used music texts in Australia. They include:

- Exploring Film Music (McGraw-Hill) [Yrs 9-12] (with Bernice Allan)
- Listen to the Music (McGraw-Hill) [Yr 7-8]
- In Tune with Music, Books 1, 2 and 3 (McGraw-Hill) [Yrs 9-12] (with Bernice Allan)
- Music: A Creative Approach, Books 1 and 2 (Art House) [Yrs 11-12] (with Bernice Allan)
- The World of Music, Books 1 and 2 (Reed International Books) [Yrs 5-6] (with Lenore Bateman)

Ian has written the music for several musicals which have been performed by over 1,000 schools and drama groups both in Australia and internationally. These musicals, published and controlled by Maverick Musicals, include:

- Man of Steel (1978)
- Sheer Luck Holmes (1980)
- Sheik, Rattle and Roll (1980)
- Bats (1983)
- The Circus (1985)
- Smithy (1986)
- Pollies (1989)
- Go Noah! (1992)
- Henry (1993)
- His Majestyís Pleasure (1994)
- The Pommy Baronet (1999)
- Curse of the Mummy (2000)
- Min Min (2000)

His Majestyís Pleasure and The Pommy Baronet are written for adult performers. Man of Steel is the most staged theatrical work in Australia and in terms of numbers of performances, Dorricott is the most-performed contemporary theatre composer in Australia.
