= Pine Rivers State High School =

Coordinates: 27°17′46″S 152°59′18″E

- Strathpine, Queensland; Australia

Information
- Type: State secondary school
- Motto: By Different Ways To Excellence
- Established: 1964
- School district: North Coast Region
- Principal: Richard James
- Grades: 7–12
- Enrolment: 1321 (2019)
- Campus: Suburban
- Website: pineriversshs.eq.edu.au

Pine Rivers State High School (Also referred to as Pine Rivers or simply The Pine] is a government state secondary school in the suburb of Strathpine, City of Moreton Bay, Queensland, Australia which caters to grade 7 to grade 12 students (11-18 year olds).

First opened in 1964 under Principal William Kemp, Pine Rivers High School is a medium sized school.

Due to its shared catchment with, and geographical proximity to, it has a faux rivalry with Bray Park State High School, however, it remains a very neutral one.

== Principals ==
Pine Rivers State High School has had eight principals in its 62-year history. Graham James Sprott was the longest-reigning principal of Pine Rivers High School - leading the school for 21 years from 1976 to 1997.

Principal	Year started	Year ended	Total time in office
William Leslie Kemp	1964	1965	2 years
Wilhelmus Leonardus Goossens	1966	1966	1 year
John Henry Bowen	1967	1975	8 years
Graham James Sprott	1976	1997	21 years
Janelle Kay Deakin	1997	2014	17 years
John Schuh	2015	2017	3 years
Doug Watson	2018	2023	6 years
Richard James	2024	current	2 years

== Captaincy/SRC ==
Year 11 and Year 8 students are announced at the end of year assembly to transition into leadership roles the following year. The role of the school captains is to represent the school at events, ceremonies, and special occasions. They also work as ambassadors on behalf of the school cohort. Within the school community, captains work alongside the Student Representative Council Executive to conduct change within the school. There’s also a junior captaincy team made of people in grade 9, albeit this board has lesser power than the grade 12 captaincy. As of 2025, teacher Josh Nugent, now head of year at grade 11, monitors the SRC (Student Representantive Council). The SRC consists of ambassadors, indigenous captains, school captains, music captains, sports captains, etc.

== Sporting houses ==
Prior 2007, Pine Rivers High School was split into four sporting houses: Kulukan, Kuran, Tjingilli and Wandajina. Upon enrolment of the school, students were put into these houses - each of which were allocated a colour that the students could choose to wear on sporting occasions, including swimming carnivals and athletics days.

Sporting house	Meaning	Colour
Kulukan	Animals	
Kuran	Plants	
Tjingilli	People	
Wandajina	Spirits	

In 2007, a choice was made to abandon the previous system of houses and split the school cohort into two sporting houses. All students (and teachers) with a surname ranging from 'A' to 'L' were assigned to the 'Pine Panthers', whereas 'M' to 'Z' were allocated to the 'Rivers Rhinos'.

Sporting house	Colour
Pine Panthers	
Rivers Rhinos	

In 2027, the sport teams will revert back to 4. The names of the teams were inspired by words from one of the many Aborignal languages. These teams include the Yarun Eagles.

== Publications ==
=== PRISM ===
Pine Rivers also releases an annual yearbook, entitled "PRISM" (The P.R. standing for ‘Pine Rivers’). This magazine is a free yearbook available to the students and teachers at the conclusion of the school year and includes photos of various school events, list of annual highlights, achievements and a complete record of the student and teacher cohort. Previously, the publication has been compiled and designed by a class of Year 12 Senior Students known as the 'PRISM Committee', however since 2015 the magazine has been formed by a group of older students and teachers, most notably a Year 10 Information Communication and Technology class.

== Events ==
Pine Rivers High School has an extensive background in both communal and school-based events. The various causes of the events range from the general enjoyment of students (walkaton, swimming/athletics carnival, etc) to showcasing the school to the public. The school also promotes various public events including Harmony Day, Anzac Day and NAIDOC Week.

=== EXPO ===
The school hosts an annual expo, which primarily serves as a way of showcasing the school to the public. Members of the general public, typically graduates from primary schools, attend the EXPO to gain a general feel of the school's atmosphere, and can sample different activities available from the school curriculum. Traditionally, EXPO showcases aspects of departments including the school's multi award-winning performing arts program. Typically, the performances include the String Ensemble, Concert Band and Stage Band, and the various dance squads the school offers.

=== Musical ===
For nearly 50 years (with the exemption of 2020 due to the COVID-19 pandemic), Pine Rivers State High School has annually staged a musical theatre production. While the production is decided by the members of Performing Arts staff, the musical includes members of the school's students. After a vigorous creation period, the musical is performed to paying members of the general public. Pine Rivers' annual musical is held around the months of March–May, and is performed over a 3-day period of Wednesday, Friday and Saturday on its respective week, with a Matinée for local primary schools to view the Musical on Tuesday morning. The school boasts the reputation of never performing the same musical twice, and celebrated its unique performance standard in 2006 by staging a remake of the 'Wizard of Oz', entitled 'The Wiz', to commemorate its original performance years earlier. The musicals vary in theme, with the most recent, 40th production, being a rendition of Little Shop of Horrors.

On 2 September 2016, Pine Rivers State High School announced that the 41st annual musical, would be Disney's "The Little Mermaid" which was performed in late April 2017.

==== Full list of Pine Rivers State High School musicals ====
Year	Production
2026	Mamma Mia!
2025	The Addams Family
2024	School of Rock
2023	The Wiz
2022	Willy Wonka & the Chocolate Factory
2021	Grease
2020	Absolutely nothing COVID-19
2019	We Will Rock You
2018	Popstars The Musical
2017	The Little Mermaid
2016	Little Shop of Horrors
2015	High School Musical
2014	Fame
2013	Hairspray
2012	Seussical
2011	Back to the 80s
2010	Godspell
2009	Burgertown
2008	Disco Inferno
2007	Bugsy Malone
2006	The Wiz
2005	Johnny Rock
2004	Sweet Charity
2003	Phantoad of the Opera
2002	Return to the Forbidden Planet
2001	The Outsiders
2000	Guys and Dolls
1999	Blues Brothers
1998	Glamalot
1997	Oklahoma!
1996	Annie
1995	Grease
1994	Best Picture, Offbeat
1993	SherWoodstock
1992	Hound of Music
1991	Smithy
1990	Bats
1989	Alice
1988	The Sentimental Bloke
1987	How to Succeed in Business Without Really Trying
1986	The Wizard of Oz
1985	Camelot
1984	Sheik, Rattle 'n' Roll
1983	Tin Pan Ali
1982	Man of Steel
1981	Joseph and His Technicolour Dream Coat
1980	No No Nanette
1979	Calamity Jane
1978	The Pyjama Game
1977	The Boyfriend

=== Walkathon ===
The school's major fundraiser, the walkathon is a sporting/social event in which students walk from the school to Pine Rivers Park, Strathpine. Although optional, enthusiastic participation of the students typically results in a dress up to suit a certain theme that the students have selected. Throughout the years the themes have had extreme variations, from the "Mad Hatter's Derby Day" to "Sparrow Invades Neverland" to even "favorite meme", whereas in recent years the school has adopted themes such as "Heroes and Villains", Disney and "Myths and Legends". In 2025, the theme was “Dynamic Duos” which focused on group costumes instead of individual costumes.

== Tuckshop ==
The school (as typical to Australian schooling) has a tuckshop, the Australian name for a school cafeteria or canteen. It sells large flavoured milk for $4.50, protein milk for $5.50, donuts for $3 on Fridays only, etc. A student in grade 10 who has wished to remain anonymous has been trying to add meal deals to the menu since 2024, but the process is taking longer than expected by a few years. Meetings have been conducted on this effort.

== Notable alumni ==
- Annette Shun Wah, SBS TV and ABC TV and radio presenter, producer
- Brenden Hall, Paralympic swimmer
- Liam De Young, Olympic hockey team
- Shane King, politician
- Jessicah Schipper, Olympic swimmer
- Cameron Smith (born 1993), golfer

== See also ==
- List of schools in Queensland
- Education in Australia
