= Lawnton, Queensland =

Lawnton
- Suburb
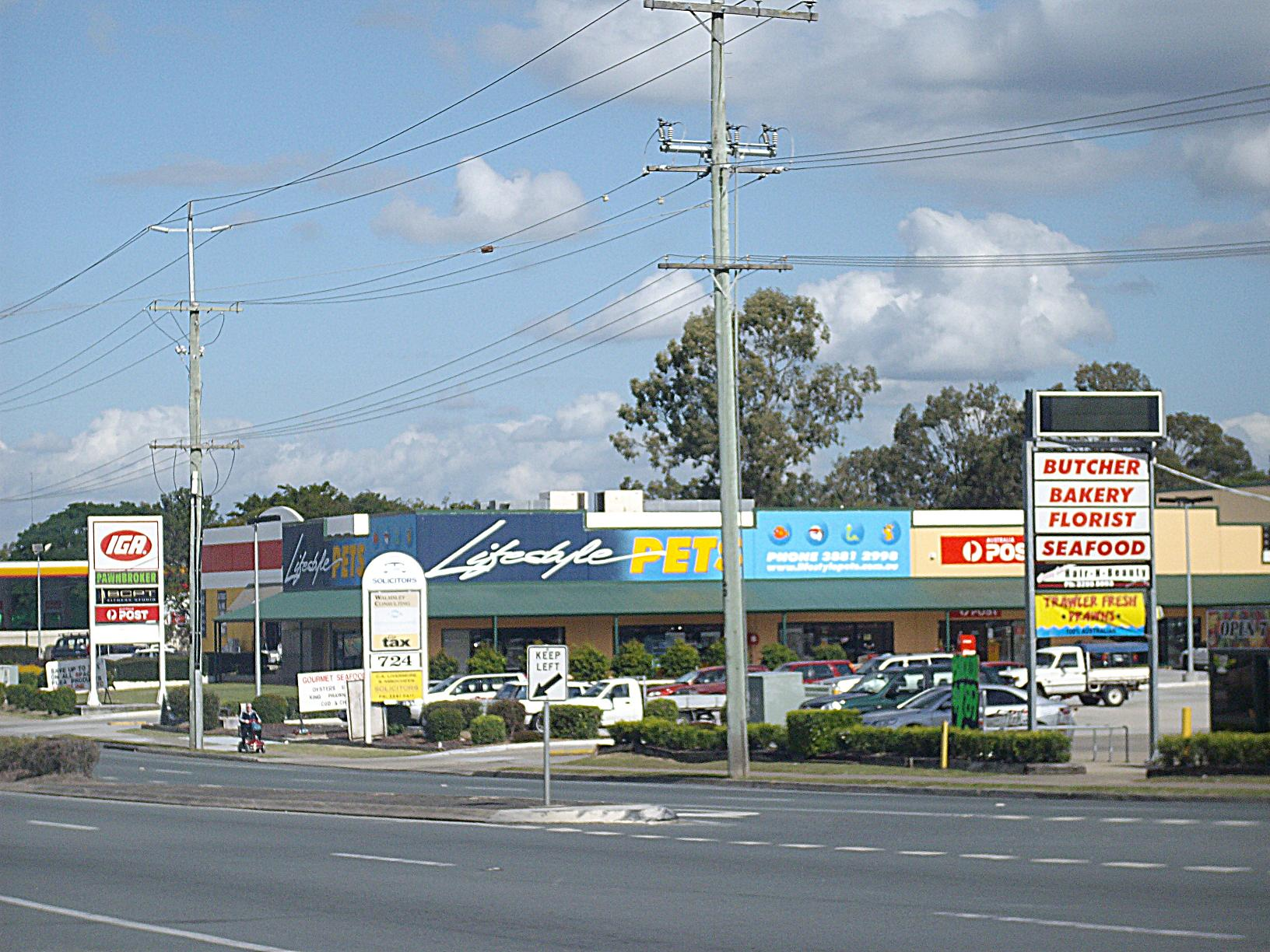
- Shops in Lawnton (c. 2008)

- Interactive map of Lawnton
- Coordinates: 27.2819°S 152.9824°E
- Country: Australia
- State: Queensland
- City: Moreton Bay
- LGA: City of Moreton Bay
- Location: 2.7 km (1.7 mi) N of Strathpine; 24.5 km (15.2 mi) N of Brisbane CBD

Government
  - State electorates: Kurwongbah; Pine Rivers
  - Federal division: Dickson

Area
  - Total: 8.6 km^{2} (3.3 sq mi)

Population
  - Total: 5,905 (2021 census)
  - Density: 687/km^{2} (1,778/sq mi)
- Time zone: UTC+10:00 (AEST)
- Postcode: 4501
Suburbs around Lawnton
Petrie	Petrie	Murrumba Downs
Joyner	Lawnton	Strathpine
Bray Park	Strathpine	Bald Hills

Lawnton is a suburb in the City of Moreton Bay, Queensland, Australia. In the 2021 census, Lawnton had a population of 5,905 people. It is part of the Brisbane metropolitan area.

== Geography ==
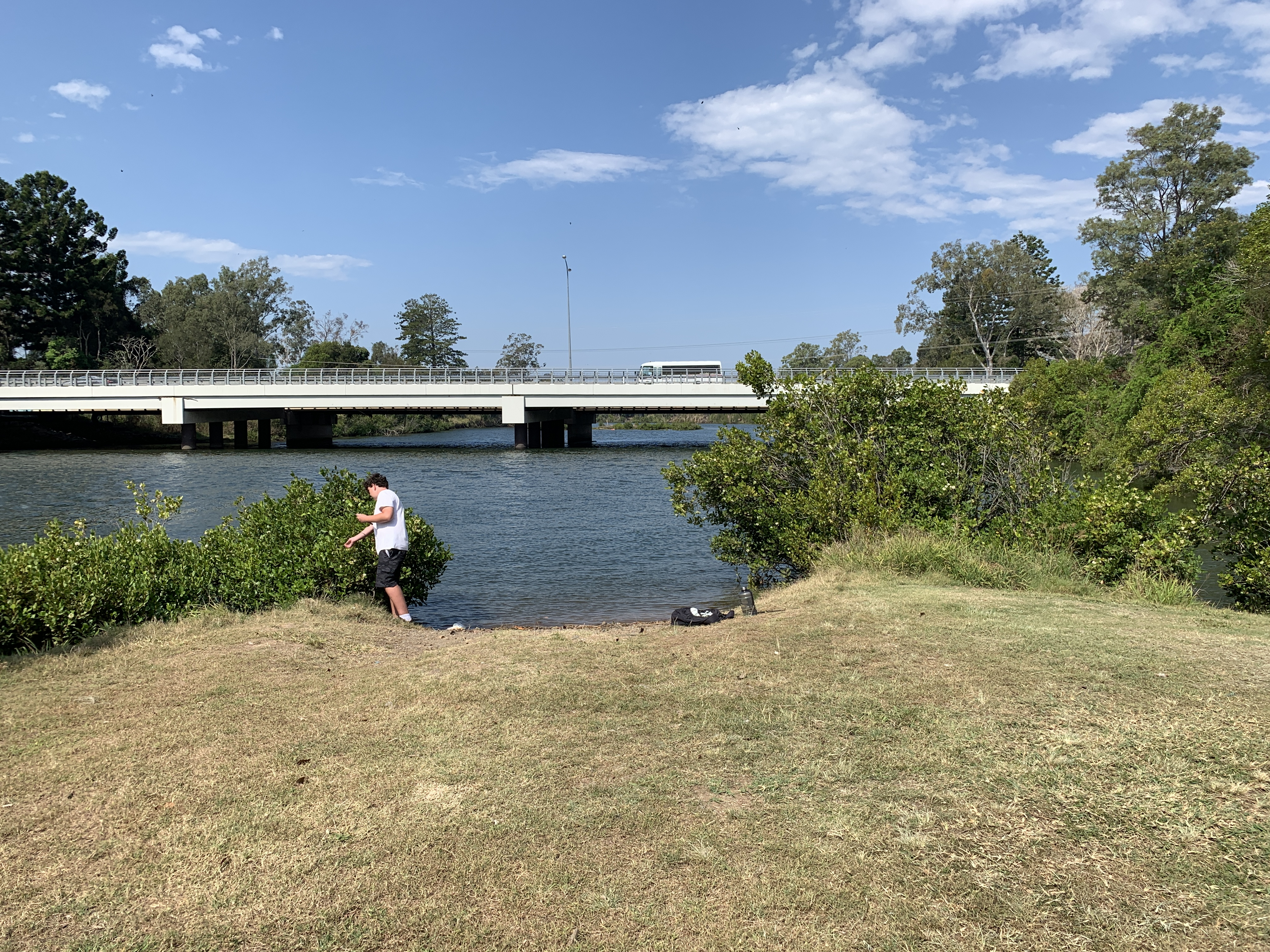
Gympie Road crosses the North Pine River, 2024

Lawnton is bounded on the north and north-east by the North Pine River, to the south-east by the South Pine River and Four Mile Creek.

Brisbane–Woodford Road, concurrent with Gympie Road enters the suburb from the south (Strathpine) and passes through the centre of the suburb in a south-north direction, exiting across a road bridge over the North Pine River.

The Caboolture railway line (North Coast railway line) enters the suburb from the south (Strathpine / Bray Park) to the west of the Brisbane-Woodford road and exits across a rail bridge over the North Pine River to the north (Petrie). The suburb served by Lawnton railway station (27.2815°S 152.9809°E).

== History ==
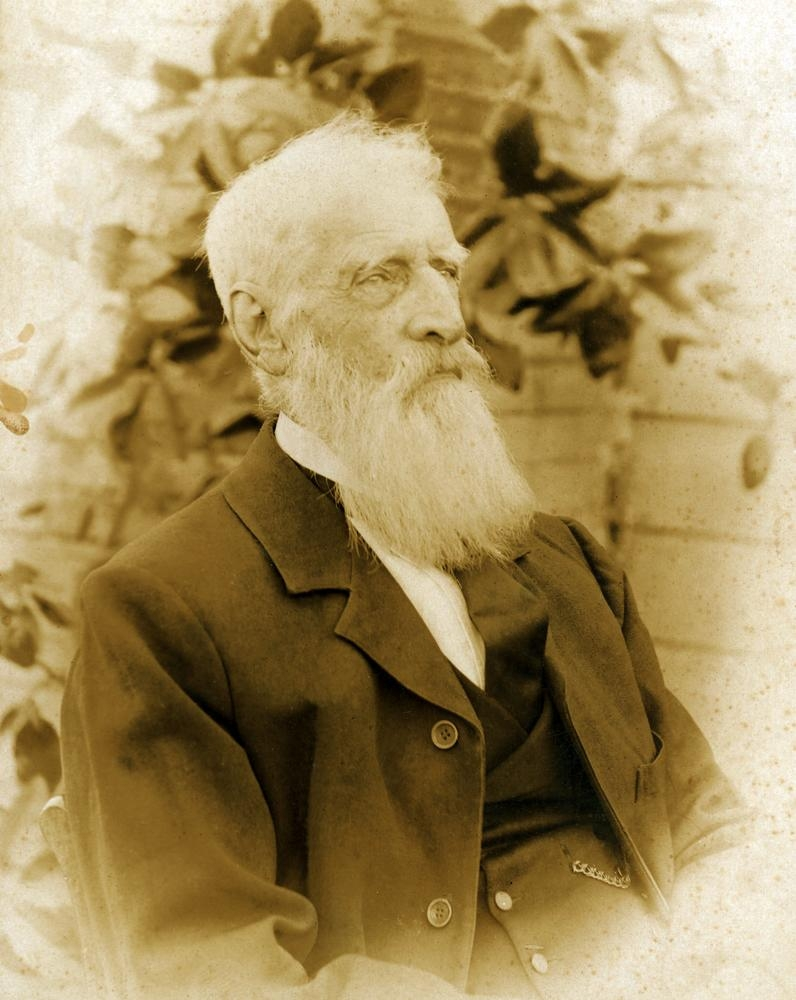
Stephen Lawn (1836–1917)

The origin of the suburb name is from an early property owner, the blacksmith Stephen Lawn. The property was acquired by Queensland Rail and was named Lawnton.

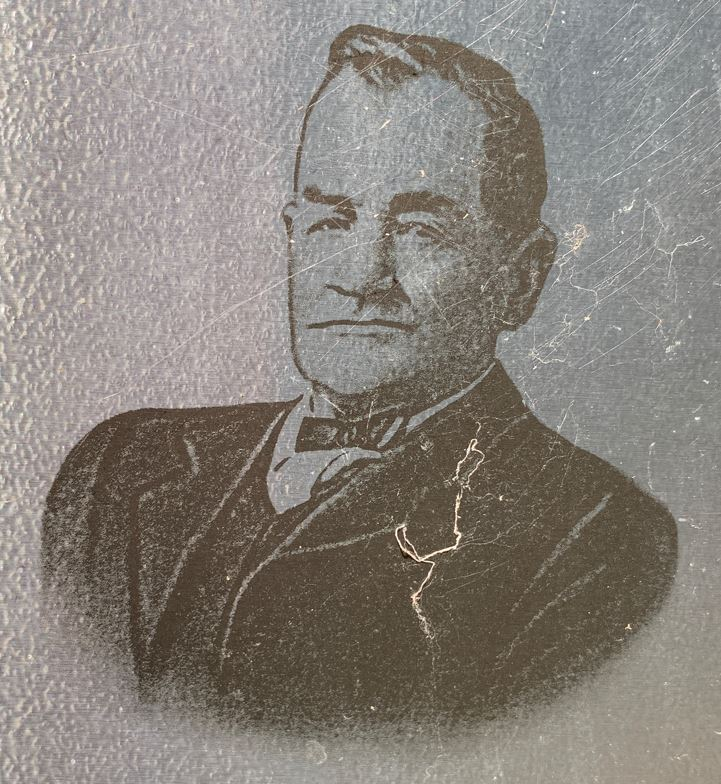
Carl Leis (1839–1926)

Lawnton Cemetery was established in the 1880s on land donated by Carl Leis (1839-1926). Leis was a German immigrant who was a local farmer and also operated as a carrier to the Gympie goldfields using a barge to take goods across the North Pine River.

On Saturday 25 August 1888, Lady Musgrave, wife of the Queensland Governor Anthony Musgrave laid the foundation stone for St Thomas’ Anglican church at North Pine (as the area was previously known). It was located on the corner of Station Road and Todds Road (27.2828°S 152.9818°E) on land donated by Stephen Lawn and built by James Todd. The church was dedicated on St Thomas's Day 21 December 1888 by Reverend C.G. Robinson, Rural Dean of Brisbane. The pulpit from the Samsonvale Homestead was donated to the church by William Joyner. The church was last used in 1984. Its altar rails were re-conditioned for re-use in the new St Faith's Anglican Church in Strathpine, while the altar and other furnishings from St Thomas's were used to create a St Thomas' Chapel within the new church. The old church was relocated to the Old Petrie Town open-air museum.

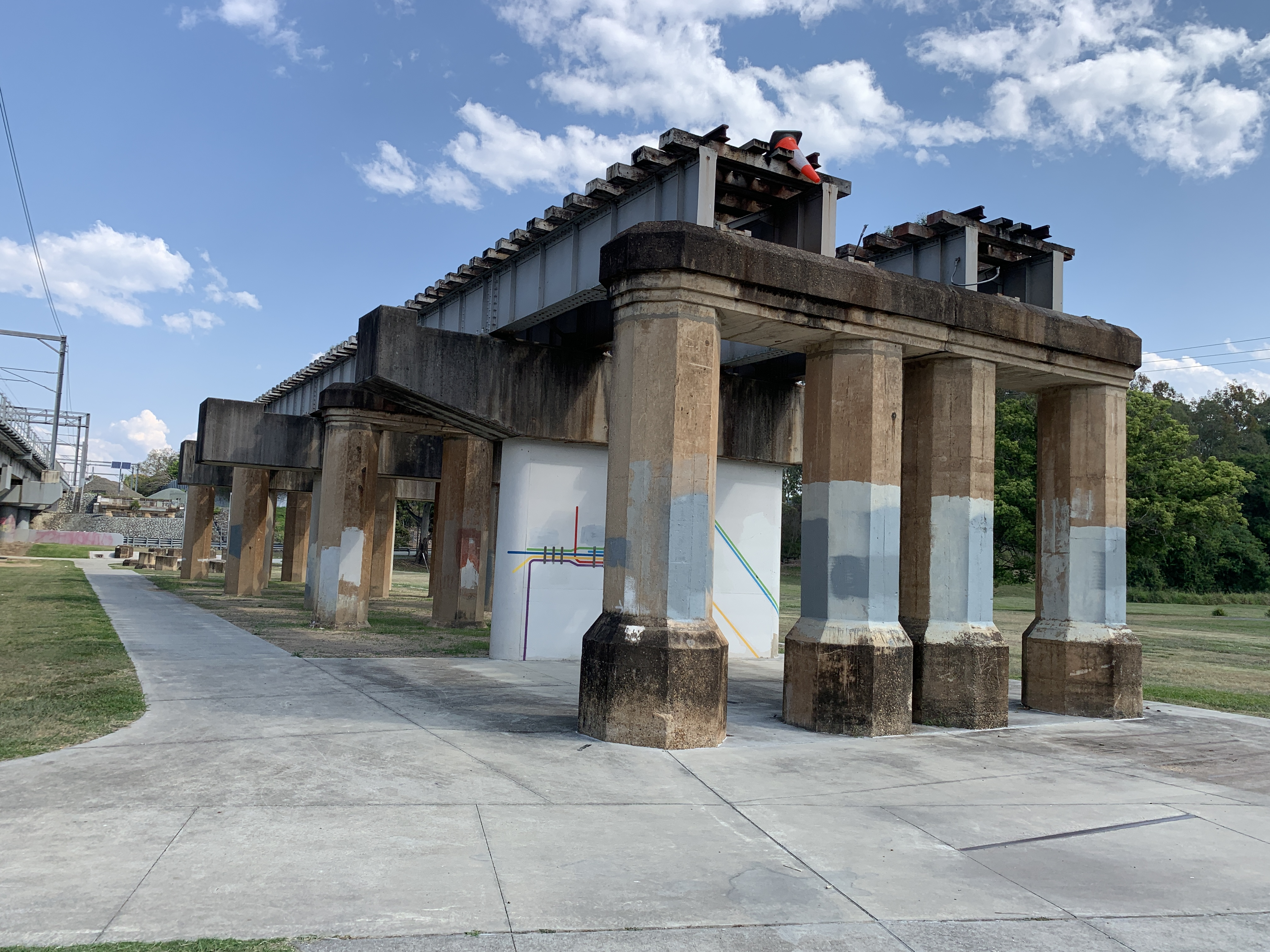
Remains of the approaches of the 1913 railway bridge, 2024

The first railway bridge over the North Pine River from Lawnton to Petrie carrying the North Coast railway line was completed in 1888; it carried one railway line. Another bridge was built in 1913 to carry two railway lines. That bridge was replaced with another bridge completed in 2016 which can carry four railway lines.

Lawnton State School opened in 1967.

Pine Rivers Special School opened in April 1986.

The area east of Gympie Road was previously known as Wyllie (named after Alexander James Wyllie) until September 1989 when the Queensland Government decided to incorporate it within the suburb of Lawnton. It was also the location of the World War II Petrie Airfield.

== Demographics ==
In the 2011 census, Lawnton recorded a population of 5,356 people, 50.9% female and 49.1% male. The median age of the Lawnton population was 36 years, 1 year below the national median of 37. 78.3% of people living in Lawnton were born in Australia. The other top responses for country of birth were New Zealand 5.1%, England 4%, Philippines 1%, India 0.9%, South Africa 0.6%. 90.7% of people spoke only English at home; the next most common languages were 0.8% Hindi, 0.5% Tagalog, 0.3% Dutch, 0.3% Italian, 0.3% Spanish.

In the 2016 census, Lawnton had a population of 5,658 people.

In the 2021 census, Lawnton had a population of 5,905 people.

== Education ==
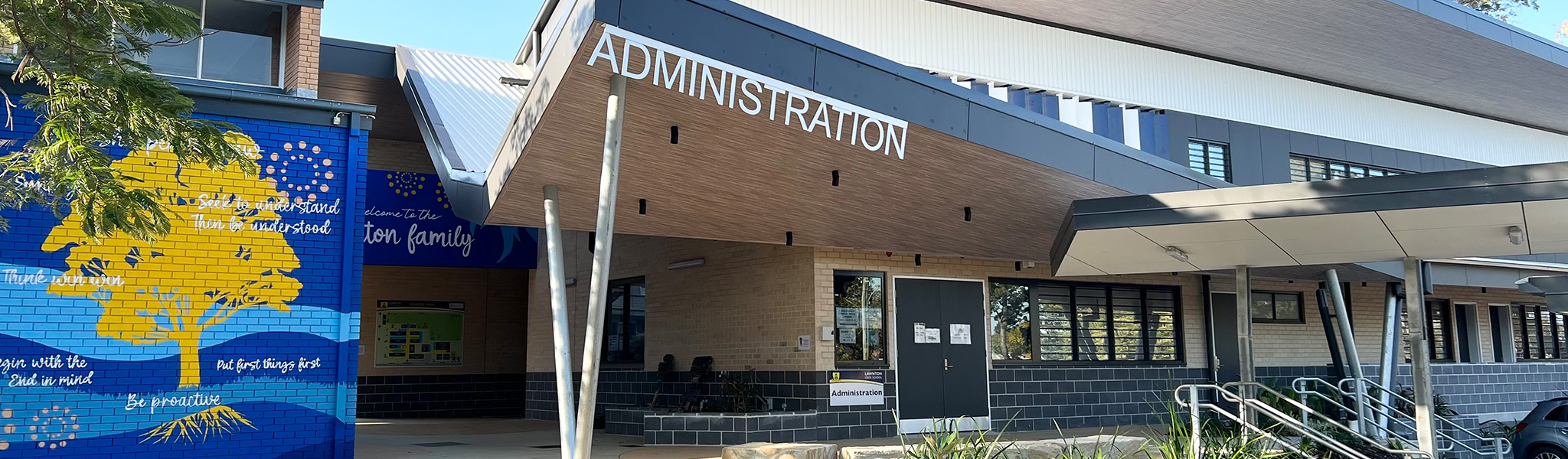
Lawnton State School, 2024

Lawnton State School is a government primary (Prep–6) school for boys and girls at 44-60 Todds Road (27.2818°S 152.9747°E). In 2018, the school had an enrolment of 553 students with 40 teachers (33 full-time equivalent) and 27 non-teaching staff (17 full-time equivalent). It includes a special education program.

Pine Rivers Special School is a special primary and secondary (Early Childhood–12) school for boys and girls at 10 Lawnton Pocket Road (27.2829°S 152.9839°E). In 2018, the school had an enrolment of 201 students with 58 teachers (49 full-time equivalent) and 62 non-teaching staff (41 full-time equivalent).

YOS Lawnton is a private secondary (10–12) school for boys and girls at 27–29 Lawnton Pocket Road (27.2830°S 152.9851°E). In 2018, the school had an enrolment of 50 students with 5 teachers and 11 non-teaching staff (8 full-time equivalent). This school is a Youth Outreach Service by the Salvation Army which aims to get students who have disengaged with schooling to re-engage.

There is no mainstream secondary school in Lawnton. The nearest government secondary schools are Pine Rivers State High School in neighbouring Strathpine to the south and Bray Park State High School in neighbouring Bray Park to the south-west.

== Amenities ==
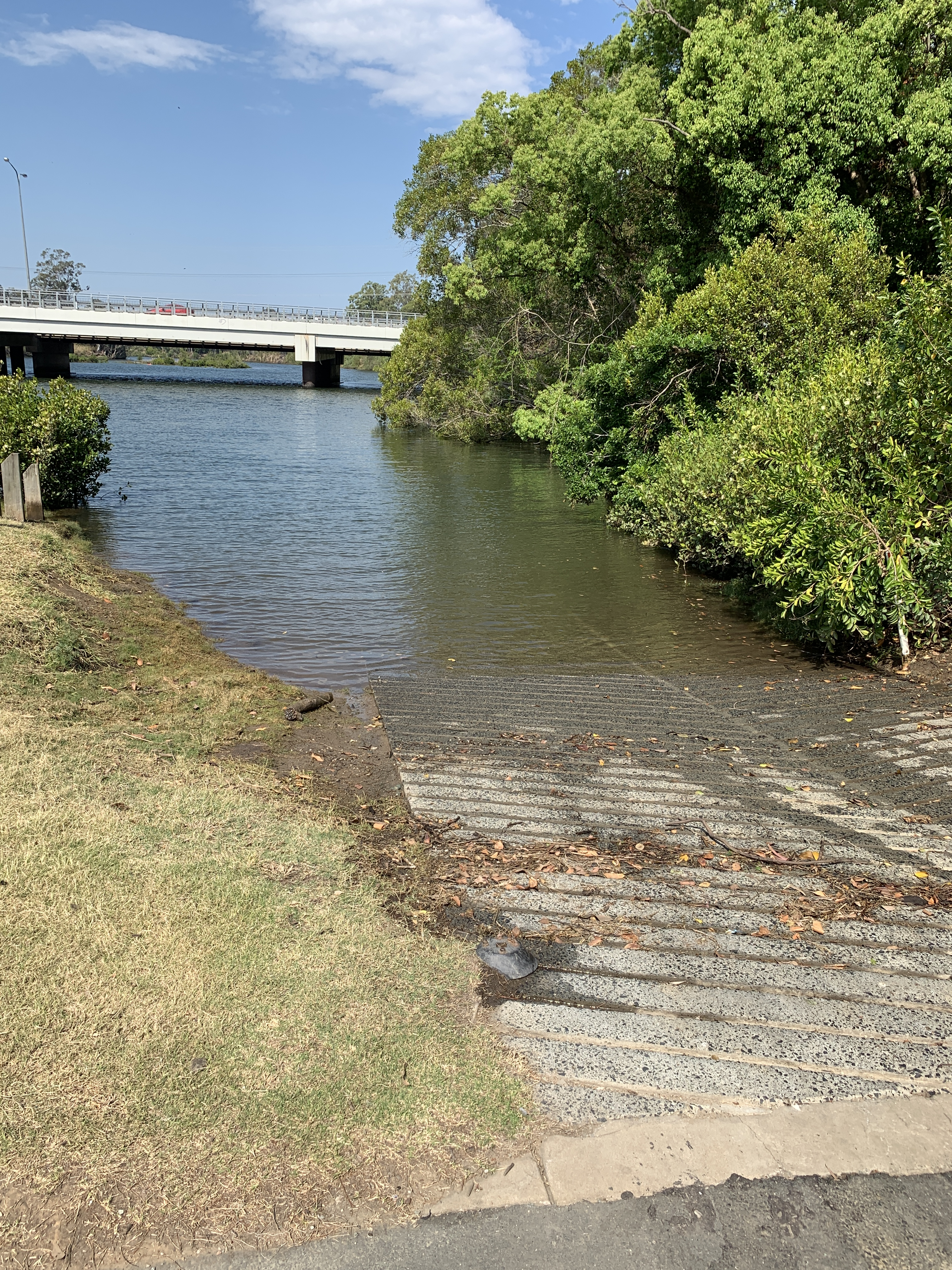
Leis Park boat ramp with the Gympie Road bridge in the background, 2024

The Moreton Bay City Council operates a mobile library service which visits Barclay Park on Nightingale Drive.

Leis Park is on Leis Parade (27.2754°S 152.9786°E). It has electric barbecues and a boat ramp into the North Pine River (27.27487°S 152.98047°E). The park and parade are both named after Carl Leis, a pioneer in the district.

== Facilities ==
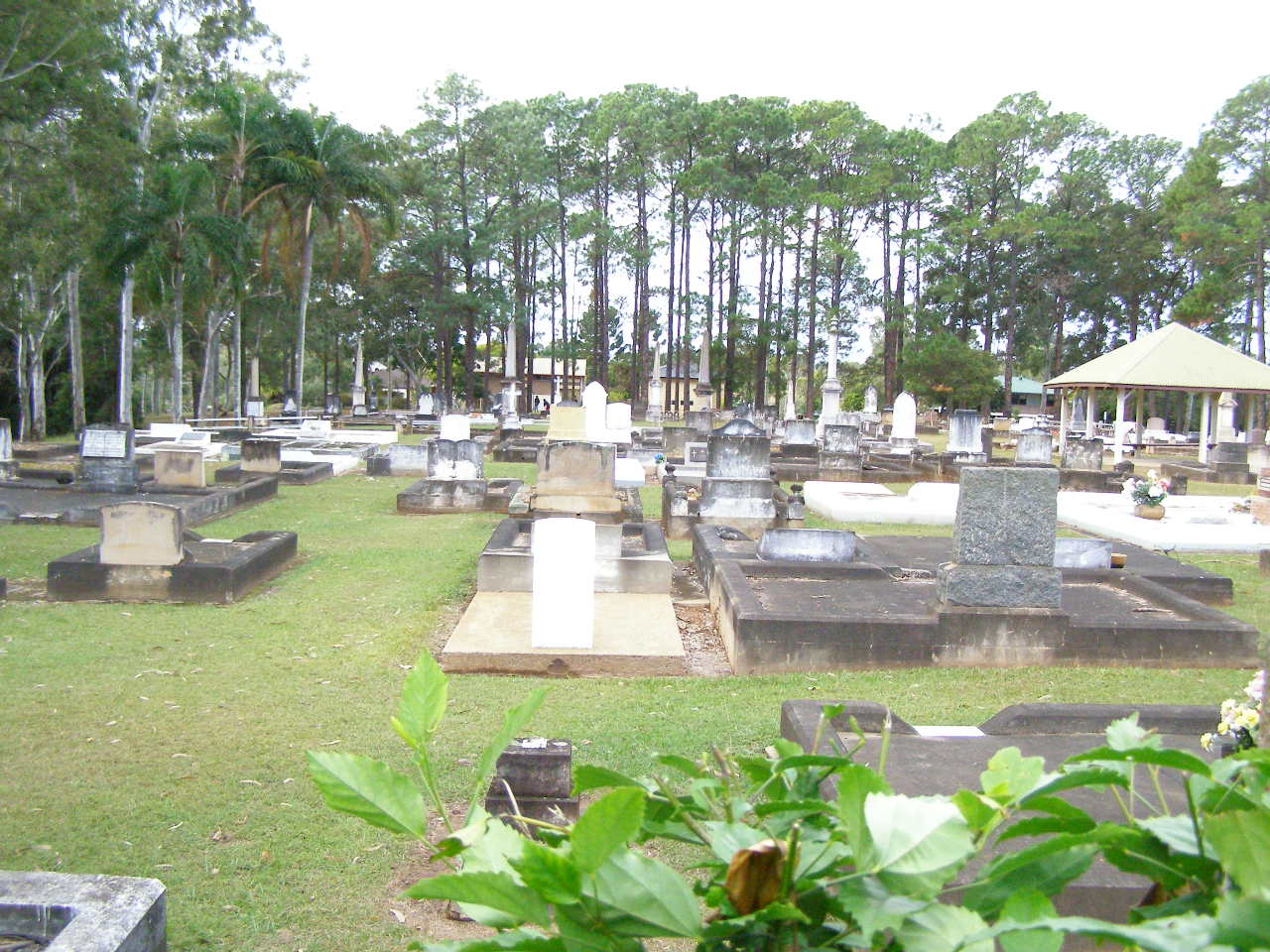
Lawnton cemetery, 2007

Lawnton Cemetery (also known as Mary Bray Park) is located on Norfolk Avenue (27.2766°S 152.9770°E).

== Transport ==
Lawnton railway station provides access to regular Queensland Rail City network services to Brisbane, Cleveland, Ipswich, Beenleigh and Springfield Central, as well as Kippa-Ring.
