= Strathpine Centre =

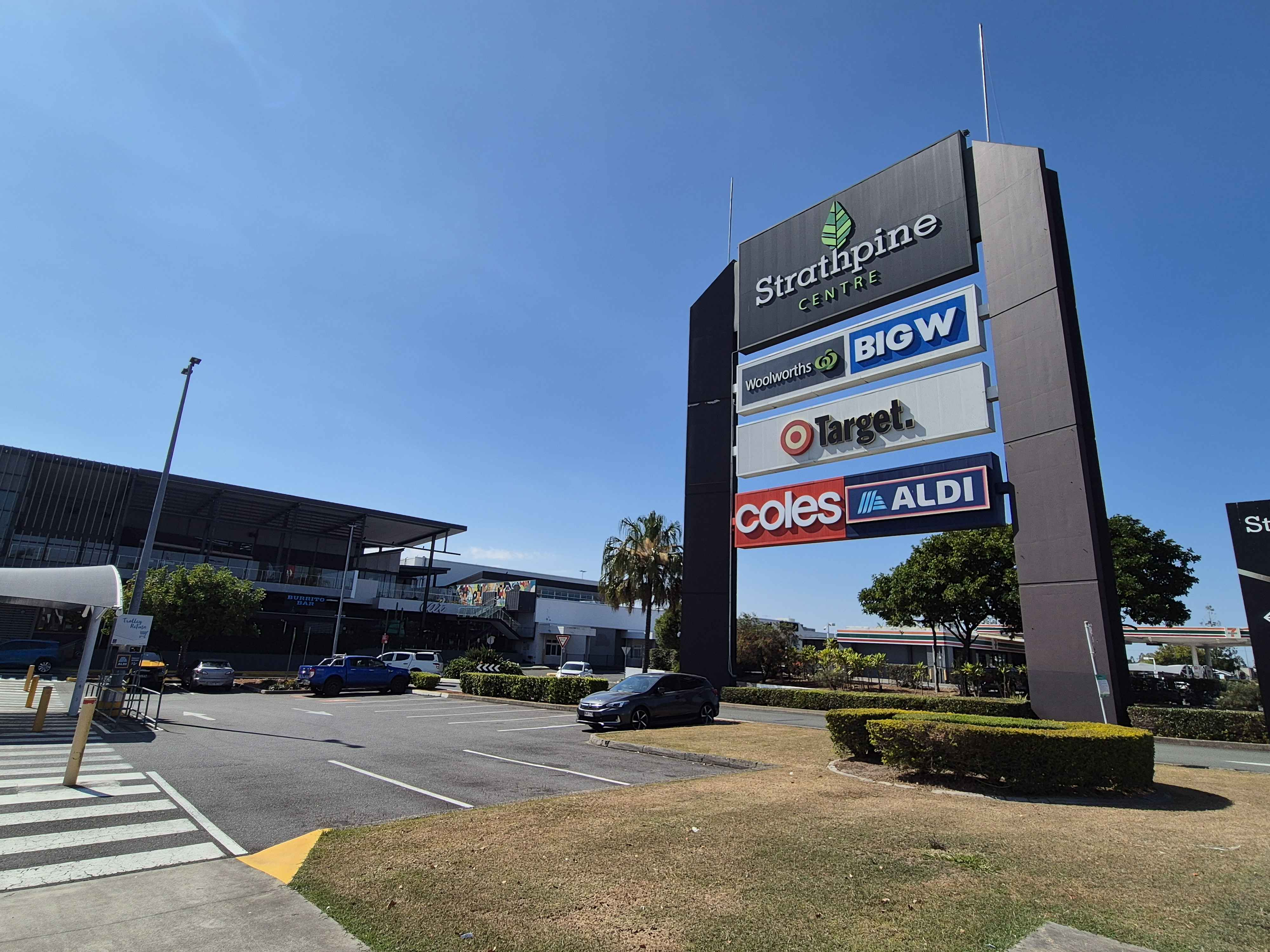
- Strathpine Centre from Gympie Road, 2025
- Location: Strathpine, Brisbane Australia
- Coordinates: 27°18′25″S 152°59′30″E
- Opened: 22 August 1983
- Developer: Westfield Group
- Manager: Retail First
- Owner: YFG Shopping Centres
- Num. of stores: 165
- Num. of anchor tenants: Aldi, Big W, Event Cinemas, Woolworths, Coles, Target
- Floor area: 47,550m^{2} or 511,828ft^{2} (approx)
- Floors: 2
- Parking: Approx 2761
- Website: strathpinecentre.com.au

Strathpine Centre is a shopping centre in Strathpine, City of Moreton Bay, Queensland, Australia.

== History ==
Strathpine Centre was built and opened on 22 August 1983 by the Westfield Group. By 1995, Rodamco owned 50%.

The centre is anchored by Big W and Target discount department stores and Woolworths, Coles and Aldi supermarkets. The centre has a food court anchored by fast food chains such as KFC and Subway. There is also an eight screen multiplex cinema (operated by Event Cinemas), bowling alley, gaming arcade and a gym on an upper mezzanine level.

Most of the centre is single level with a rooftop carpark. It has a bus station with services to Chermside, Toombul, Redcliffe and local services to surrounding suburbs. Strathpine Centre is about a 10-minute walk to Strathpine railway station, with services to Kippa-Ring and Springfield Central via Brisbane.

Strathpine Centre has approximately 165 specialty stores mostly within the categories of clothing, general merchandise, homewares and cosmetics.

Scentre Group owned and managed the centre as Westfield Strathpine until it was sold in August 2015 to 151 Property, a subsidiary of the Blackstone. In January 2022 it was sold to YFG Shopping Centres.

After the closure of the Myer department store at Strathpine on 3 March 2007, the section of centre where Myer was located was closed off to allow for a redesign. A new mall was unveiled shortly thereafter and at the time of opening featured a Target discount department store, JB Hi-Fi and many other retail stores.

A new two level Myer store opened in 2008 at Westfield North Lakes, ensuring that Myer still has a department store in the City of Moreton Bay.

Strathpine bus station is serviced by Translink bus routes. It is part of Strathpine Centre. The bus station was upgraded in 2023 to upgrade wheelchair accessibility and security.
