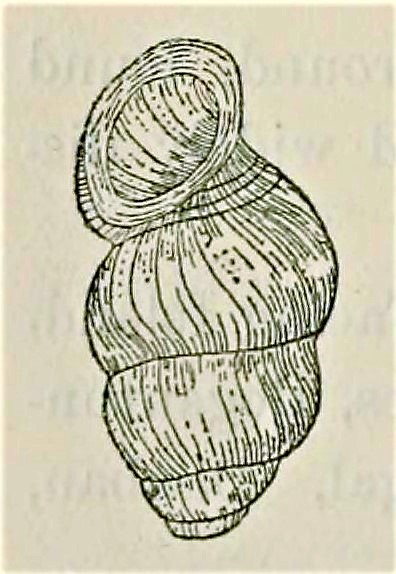

Conservation status
- Vulnerable (IUCN 3.1)

Scientific classification
- Kingdom: Animalia
- Phylum: Mollusca
- Class: Gastropoda
- Subclass: Caenogastropoda
- Order: Littorinimorpha
- Family: Tateidae
- Genus: Fluvidona
- Species: F. anodonta

Binomial name
- Fluvidona anodonta (Hedley & Musson, 1892)

Synonyms
- Angrobia anodonta; Heterocyclus anodonta Hedley, 1893; Pupa anodonta Hedley & Musson, 1892

= Fluvidona anodonta =

Species of gastropod

Fluvidona anodonta, more commonly known as the North Pine River freshwater snail, is a species of small freshwater snail that is endemic to Australia. Originally discovered in 1892 by Hedley & Musson, the snail is highly elusive and only has been sighted four times since its discovery. The snail is 2 mm long and 1 mm wide with the shell colouring being of a yellow-whiteish shade. Fluvidona anodonta resides within the City of Moreton Bay, specifically in four river systems within the D'Aguilar National Park, Queensland. The four river systems are the South Pine River headwaters, the North Pine River headwaters, Kobble Creek and Low Branch Creek. The snail is found under deeply submerged rocks within permanent freshwater systems.

Fluvidona anodonta's habitat has multiple human imposed threats including habitat fragmentation, road water runoff unbalancing the natural ecosystem and horses disturbing the underwater ecosystem. In 2011 the International Union for Conservation of Nature listed Fluvidona anodonta as a vulnerable species. There are currently no species specific conservation measures, however general recommendations for the protection of organisms living in similar environments have been made. These include habitat monitoring for increased pollution levels as well as surveying the current distribution and populations of the snail.

== Discovery ==
Originally named Pupa anodonta, the Fluvidona anodonta snail was discovered by Hedley & Musson in 1892 in the North Pine River system in Australia. Fluvidona anodonta was titled its common name, the "North Pine River Freshwater Snail" in 1996 in response to its connection with the North Pine River system. The snail is elusive and there is very little available information available. In the 1980s, the Australian Museum undertook several scientific sampling tours to Southeast Queensland to find the snail. However the tours only resulted in a single broken shell. Since then, scientists have only seen the snail four times, one of those times being when samples were sent to the Australian Museum during a Council stream and health biodiversity assessment.

== Shape ==
The North Pine River freshwater snail is a minute freshwater snail with a length of 2mm, measured from the bottom of the opening to the tip of the spire and has a width of 1 mm. The shell consists of 4 dextral whorls, meaning the whorls turn to the right. The connecting seam between each whorl is indented with the last and largest whorl constitutes two-thirds of the total length of the shell. The shell shape is pupiform, meaning the tip is rounded off and the shell overall has an ovular shape. The rim of the shell opening is slightly thickened compared to the rest of the shell. The shell's colouring takes a light yellow-whiteish form. The shell has fibrous striae markings that run length ways along the shell.

Diagram of a snail's shell

== Habitat ==
Fluvidona anodonta is endemic to Australia, particularly Southern Queensland as it only inhabits freshwater river systems in the City of Moreton Bay. The snail has been recorded in four different locations within the D'Aguilar National Park in Queensland. These are the headwaters of the South Pine River, the headwaters of the North Pine River, Kobble Creek and Low Branch Creek. The snail resides in freshwater habitats which are permanently filled with water such as rivers, streams, creeks and waterfalls. The species is found under deeply embedded rocks and is assumed to feed by scraping bacteria and microalgae.

The North Pine River freshwater snail's extent of occurrence is 20 km^{2}, clustering this species in a small geographic area. This demonstrates strict habitual conditions for the snail to survive. The species' restricted occurrence is also due to its limited dispersal power. The snail's small size and slow ability to move both contribute to its limited dispersal ability to move away from the population in which they were born, to another location where they will settle and reproduce.

== Endangerment ==
In 2011 the North Pine River Freshwater Snail was listed as vulnerable by the International Union for Conservation of Nature. The species was categorised as vulnerable due to its area of occupancy being less than 20 km^{2}. Furthermore the species has only been reported four times following its discovery.

== Habitual threats ==
Fluvidona anodonta's largest threat is habitat deterioration due to human forces. All four sites where the snail has been previously found have man made threats that cause concern for the survival of the species.

The headwaters of the South Pine River are located in close proximity to the Mount Glorious Road. This road is a major road, experiencing much traffic due to it connecting two major state highways and for its picturesque driving views. Furthermore, it connects the well populated suburbs of Highvale, Samford Valley and Samford Village. The small distance between the South Pine River headwaters and Mount Glorious Road cause concern as polluted road runoff has been found to degrade the water systems quality as well as the quality of plants growing on the water's edge in the riparian zone. Road runoff can pick up and deposit harmful pollutants such as litter, chemicals and dirt, and transport them into water systems, thus unbalancing the ecosystem's natural levels. Resultingly this may lead to the destruction of Fluvidona anodonta's limited natural habitat.

The headwaters of the North Pine River are seriously threatened by habitat fragmentation caused by land clearing for farmland. Currently the headwaters of the North Pine River and its lower distributaries have been separated by cleared pastureland. Overall cleared pastureland is detrimental to the environment as it reduces habitat quality and biodiversity value. However, its main effect relevant to the survival of Fluvidona anodonta is its effect on the water systems. Land clearing harmfully effects the water flow pattern within the environment, resulting in longer periods of dry creeks along with more frequent bursts of flash flooding. Fluvidona anodonta is a species which relies on permanent freshwater systems for its survival, therefore a change to the water flow pattern of the environment may inhibit the snail from attaining its food source which is found in the water. Furthermore, land clearing results in increased soil erosion, sedimentation and an imbalance of nutrient loads in the water systems. The imbalance of nutrient loads in the water systems results in eutrophication, which creates algae blooms and depletes the oxygen levels within the water. Thus killing the organisms and plants which reside beneath the water and disturbing the natural food chain.

Adjacent to the Lower Branch Creek is land that is largely used for agriculture, which typically comes with much use of horses. Horse hoofs have a damaging effect on stream health as the constant disturbance of the stream floor destroys bottom living, in stream ecosystems which are a vital component of the stream ecosystem. Horses riding through rivers may potentially disturb Fluvidona anodonta which reside under rocks beneath the water. Furthermore, horse hooves transport eroded sediment and chemical pollutants especially nitrogen and phosphorus from their manure, which may be deposited in water systems and cause an imbalance of nutrient loads in the water. The increased level of nitrogen and phosphorus cause excessive growth to algae thus leading to eutrophication. The Lower Branch Creek stream system has the worst quality out of all Fluvidona anodonta's ecosystems, thus demonstrating that the snail can tolerate a certain degree of eutrophication in the environment. The proliferation of algae blocks the sunlight from penetrating beneath the water, causing some plants to die.

At present, the streams inhabited by Fluvidona anodonta are clean and largely pristine. However due to its limited dispersal power and distribution, the snail is vulnerable to slight deteriorations in its habitat. This is reflected by Haase and Nolte (2008) giving the species a score of 9 out of 10 in vulnerability to environmental deteriorations. Meaning that Fluvidona anodonta is restricted to undisturbed sites and cannot tolerate any level of pollution. This causes concern as the snail does not exhibit a large population.

== Conservation efforts ==
There are no species-specific conservation measures in place for Fluvidona anodonta, however there have been multiple recommendations for its protection. The International Union for Conservation of Nature recommended that habitat monitoring occur, to detect any sign of pollution in the snail's habitat. This addresses the species inability to tolerate habitat change and its habitual requirement of clean fresh water. The Queensland Government currently engages in frequent water quality checks within the D'Aguilar National Park and assesses for increased levels of pollution. Furthermore it was recommended that surveying population trends occur to accurately assess the long-term viability of the population.

Malacologist, Dr. Ulrike Nolte similarly published a report for the Queensland Government that suggested that targeted surveys occur to determine Fluvidona anodonta's current distribution and population status. This is because it is critical to protect and monitor the remaining habitat sheltering the species. It was further highly recommended to protect all four confirmed habitat sites of the snail from further environmental degradation. This may eventuate through creating more environmentally friendly water run off system, educating neighbouring farmers about the negative impact that horses have on the environment as well as imposing stricter land clearing regulations.

== Comparison with other Fluvidona species ==
Fluvidona anodonta is one of several species in the Fluvidona genus. Within the genus are Fluvidona dorrigoensis (Miller, Ponder & Clark, 1999), Fluvidona griffithsi (Miller, Ponder & Clark, 1999), Fluvidona orphana (Miller, Ponder & Clark, 1999) and Fluvidona petterdi (Miller, Ponder & Clark, 1999). This species as a whole are all endemic to northern New South Wales and southern Queensland in Australia. They are all relatively similar, being separated on differences in shape and size of their shell and in anatomical details. They have elongate-conic shells with adults having a slightly thickened opening, also known as aperture and the operculum bears one or more pegs.

Fluvidona anodonta is very similar to Fluvidona petterdi in shell features, however, it tends to be smaller in shape. The two differ in that Fluvidona anodonta has shorter opercular pegs, which are the pegs on the inner side of the operculum that provides additional surface for muscle attachments. All Fluvidona species except Fluvidona orphana lack a penial lobe.

See also

- List of non-marine molluscs of Australia
