= Petrie State School =

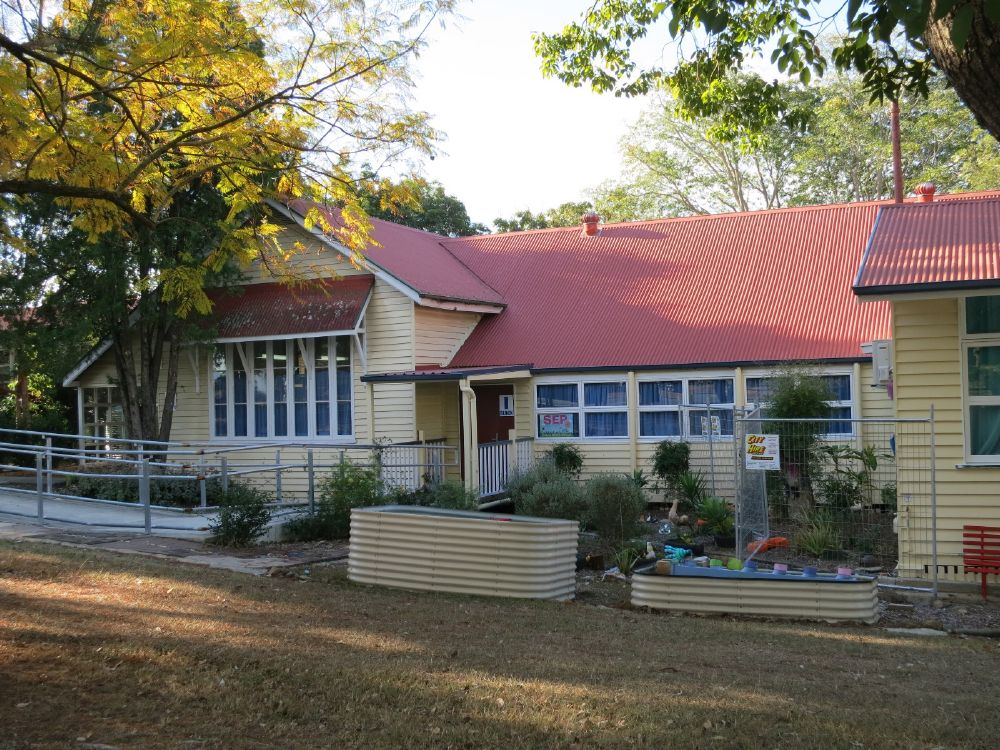
- Petrie State School, Stanley building, 2014

- Location within Queensland
- 27.2683°S 152.9725°E
- Location: 42 Dayboro Road (Brisbane Woodford Road), Petrie, City of Moreton Bay, Queensland, Australia

History
- Built: 1878 (Stanley building), 1888 (Ferguson building)

Site notes
- Architect(s): Francis Drummond Greville Stanley; Robert and John Ferguson

Queensland Heritage Register
- Official name: Petrie State School; Pine River North State School; North Pine River Provisional School; North Pine State School
- Type: state heritage
- Designated: 10 October 2014
- Reference no.: 602841
- Type: Education, research, scientific facility: School-state
- Theme: Educating Queenslanders: Providing primary schooling
- Builders: Queensland Department of Public Works

Petrie State School is a heritage-listed state school at 42 Dayboro Road (Brisbane Woodford Road), Petrie, City of Moreton Bay, Queensland, Australia. It was designed by Francis Drummond Greville Stanley and Robert and John Ferguson, and built in 1878 and 1888 by the Queensland Department of Public Works. It is also known as Pine River North State School, North Pine River Provisional School, and North Pine State School. It was added to the Queensland Heritage Register on 10 October 2014.

== History ==
Petrie State School opened in 1879 as Pine River North State School, replacing two "half-time" provisional schools that had begun operating to the south and north of the North Pine River in 1874 and 1875 respectively. The state school was built on 2 acres (0.81 ha) of land donated in 1877 by early settler Thomas (Tom) Petrie. The first school teaching building, designed by Queensland Colonial Architect FDG Stanley, was erected during 1878. As settlement increased, the school expanded to have other structures and landscape elements, including an extension designed by architects Robert and John Ferguson (1888). The school has been in continuous operation since establishment and has been a focus for the local community as a place for important social and cultural activity.

Prior to European settlement, the Pine Rivers area was home to a number of clans belonging to the Turrbal, Kabi and Waka language groups. Convict timber getters were recorded in the area in the 1820s, and in the early 1840s pastoral runs were established on either side of the North Pine River. In 1859 Tom Petrie established a 6,400-acre (2,600 ha) run, known as Murrumba, which extended to Sideling Creek in the west, Redcliffe Point in the east, and to the Pine and North Pine rivers in the south. Petrie was also involved in timber getting, utilising the rafting ground at Sweeney's Reserve, south-east of the present state school site.

Closer settlement in the area commenced in 1862, with the sale by selection of portions in the "Redcliff Agricultural Reserve". Having had his pastoral leases cancelled by this reserve, Tom Petrie purchased a homestead block (portion 23, east of the school site), and leased nearby Portions 24, 25, 29 and 30. A coach route from Brisbane to Gympie, with a staging post at Petrie's Murrumba Homestead, was established in late 1868 by Cobb & Co. A road bridge was built next to the ford at Sweeney's Reserve in 1877, and the North Coast Railway was constructed north from Brisbane to Caboolture by 1888. Tom Petrie took advantage of the railway running through his property to subdivide part of it as the North Pine Terminus Township in 1885. This became the nucleus of the township of North Pine. In 1877, Tom Petrie had also donated land for the establishment of the town's first state school.

The provision of state-administered education was important to the colonial governments of Australia. In 1848 the New South Wales Government established National Schools. This was continued by the Queensland Government after the colony's separation in 1859. The Education Act 1860 established the Queensland Board of General Education and began to standardise curriculum, teacher training, and facilities. The State Education Act 1875 provided a number of key initiatives for primary education; it was to be free, compulsory and secular. The Department of Public Instruction was established to administer the Act. This move standardised the provision of education and, despite difficulties, colonial educators achieved a remarkable feat in bringing basic literacy to most Queensland children by 1900.

The establishment of schools was considered an essential step in the development of early communities and integral to their success. Locals often donated land and labour for a school's construction and the school community contributed to maintenance and development. Schools became a major community focus for social interaction, a symbol of progress and a source of pride with enduring connections formed with past pupils, parents and teachers. The inclusion of war memorials and halls used for community purposes reinforced these connections together with fetes, markets, public holiday celebrations, school break-up days, fundraisers, polling days, sporting events, reunions, and dances, all held within the schools' buildings and grounds.

During the 1870s, the farming community at North Pine sought educational facilities for the local children. From 1869, provisional schools were the alternative to national schools if minimum student numbers (30) could not be met (which was frequently the case given that Queensland's rural population was small, scattered and often transient). Provisional schools were seen as a convenient means of providing an elementary education throughout the colony and soon became an integral part of the educational landscape. A provisional school could be opened with as few as 15 (later 12) pupils. The Board of General Education gave financial assistance to local committees to set up and maintain these schools. The local community provided a building (often slab and shingle) and found a teacher, and the Board paid the teacher's salary relative to the number of pupils. The provisional teacher was often badly trained and poorly paid, but at least some elementary education was being provided. If the local population moved on (perhaps following new gold discoveries or a railway under construction), the provisional school was closed at little expense to the Board. If the district or town developed, provisional schools were raised to national (later state) school status, with purpose-designed school buildings and teacher residences attracting better qualified and more experienced teachers.

At North Pine, a meeting was held on 20 April 1874 to elect a school committee, and the North Pine River Crossing Provisional School No.183 opened on 22 April 1874 in a rented room south of the North Pine River. As there was no bridge, two provisional schools were planned, on a half-time basis, to avoid the hazards of children crossing the river to attend classes. The teacher would teach on the south side of the river for the morning and on the north side of the river in the afternoon, a unique arrangement in the Moreton region. The northern school (No.1831/2), a small slab hut with shingle roof, opened for the 1875 school year. The schools became known as North Pine I (Provisional) [south side], and North Pine II (Provisional) [north side]. An inspection in August 1875 recorded 16 students present (of 20 enrolled) at North Pine I, with 13 students present (of 14) at North Pine II.

The opening of the bridge at Sweeney's Reserve in 1877 allowed the two provisional schools to amalgamate into one state school. At a meeting in June 1877, Tom Petrie donated 2 acres (0.81 ha) of land for the new school. The site, at the south-west corner of Portion 30, was surveyed the same year, and was gazetted a Reserve for a School in 1878. The new school was located north of the river, on the north side of the Dayboro Road. The community had to raise 20% of the construction cost. By November 1877, tenders had been called and £90 had been subscribed for construction. The school classroom and a teacher's residence were built during 1878, and the school opened for the 1879 school year as Pine River North State School.

From the 1860s until the 1960s school buildings were predominantly timber framed, which took advantage of the material's abundance in the state and the high number of builders skilled in its use. This also allowed for easy and economical construction and enabled the government to provide facilities in remote areas. Due to the standardisation of facilities, schools across the state were developed in distinctly similar ways and became complexes of typical components. These components included: teaching building/s, school yard, sports oval, head teacher's residence, and a variety of landscape elements such as sporting facilities or play equipment, playsheds, gardens and trees.

The new Pine River North State School building was constructed to a standard design by Colonial Architect Francis Drummond Greville (FDG) Stanley who was then responsible for all government school designs. During his prolific career he was also responsible for many important government and private buildings. For his schools Stanley became the first to develop standard designs and produce "classes" of buildings that would later evolve into "types". The vast majority of subsequent school buildings in Queensland were built from standard "type" designs.

Stanley's school designs were typically low-set, timber framed structures with separate residential accommodation provided. Distinguishing characteristics include the classroom width, the location, size and detailing of windows, and central stairs to the verandah in line with a central access door. Stanley's designs also remedied weatherproofing problems of preceding school designs by cladding the exterior with chamferboards and lining the interiors. Although many Stanley school buildings were constructed, few remain and extant examples are rare. Known examples survive at the former Carbrook State School, Tallegalla State School, former Hemmant State School, Kalkie State School and Aramac State School.

The 1878 school building constructed at North Pine was a low-set, timber, gable-roofed building with verandahs on the south-west and north-east sides, located close to Dayboro Road at the southern end of the school reserve. A 1936 plan of the building shows a main room of 18 feet (5.5 m) by 33 feet 9 inches (10.29 m), a southern verandah measuring 8 feet (2.4 m) wide, and a northern verandah measuring 7 feet 8 inches (2.34 m) wide. By 1936 the northern verandah had a small enclosure at the eastern end.

By 1887 the school had become too crowded and needed to be enlarged. Another low-set building with a main room of 40 by 20 feet (12.2 by 6.1 m), and a western verandah 8 feet (2.4 m) wide, with semi-enclosed hat rooms at each end and a central staircase, was built in 1888 to a standard design by Robert and John Ferguson. The tender of Thomas Curry, for £319/10/0, was accepted by the Education Department in December 1887. The new building was added to the north-western end of the Stanley school building, connected by at least one internal door.

In 1879 the Department of Public Instruction appointed its own Superintendent of Buildings to be responsible for the design of all government schools, the first appointee being the builder-architect Robert Ferguson. Ferguson immediately revised the design of schools to address deficiencies in ventilation and lighting and this period of education design was pivotal in this regard. In his designs he allowed for ventilation of the classrooms and ceiling space by providing prominent and decorative ventilation fleches to the roof. The standard Ferguson classroom was a low-set, timber-framed structure with a gable roof, verandahs front and back, and modest "Carpenter Gothic" timber detailing. It included a coved ceiling; while timber roof trusses were exposed within the space. Many more and larger windows were introduced with high sill heights that did not allow draughts and sunlight to enter the room.

In 1885 Robert Ferguson was replaced by his brother John Ferguson who continued to implement his brother's designs until John's death in 1893, when responsibility for school buildings passed back to the Department of Public Works. The Ferguson period (1879–1893) is distinct and marked by extensive redesign of school buildings including associated structures and furniture. The Ferguson brothers' designs were reflective of education requirements of the time, responsive to criticism of previous designs, revolutionary in terms of internal environmental quality, technically innovative, popular and successful and provided a long-lasting legacy of good educational design.

The building of a second classroom at the Pine River North State School coincided with the rise of dairy farming as the economic mainstay of the region, aided by the opening of the railway line through North Pine, which allowed local farmers to rail their cream to butter factories to the north and south. The Samsonvale Butter Factory opened to the west in 1892, later reopening in 1903 at Terror's Creek (Dayboro) as the Silverwood Butter Factory.

In 1896 the school was renamed North Pine State School, and retained this name after the town of North Pine changed its name to Petrie in 1911. Over the following years, changes to the school included the construction of a playshed in 1907 and improvements to the school residence. By 1918 there were 112 children enrolled. At some point, a World War I Honour Board, listing 44 past pupils of the school who had enlisted, was located at the school (now removed). A tennis court was completed in 1934.

Under the stewardship of the Department of Public Works which retained responsibility for schools until 2013, and through the involvement of some of Queensland's most innovative architects, school buildings became more advanced and diverse. This was the outcome of years of systematic reform and experimentation.

Achieving an ideal or even adequate level of natural light in classrooms, without glare, was of critical importance to educators. After 1900 the virtues of maximum natural ventilation and controlled, high-levels of natural light in teaching buildings were extolled and became central to the design and layout of all school buildings. Architects experimented with different combinations of roof, ceiling and wall vents, larger windows, dormer windows and ducting. Roof ventilators became fleches which grew larger as the experimentation continued. Windows were rearranged and enlarged to provide a greater amount of gentle, southern light into the room. Desks were rearranged so that the light would fall onto students' left sides to avoid throwing shadows onto the pages; this presupposed that all students would be right-handed. The change in philosophy often meant a complete transformation of the openings in existing buildings. Windows were larger and sills were lowered to let in more light generally.

In 1937, the fenestration of the North Pine School buildings was altered to improve lighting and ventilation. Windows were rearranged and doors were rehung in both the Stanley and Ferguson buildings. Banks of windows in the gable end walls of both buildings were lowered so that the sill was 3 feet (0.91 m) above the floor, and the sashes were rehung as casements with new fanlights above. By this stage, the number of windows in the end walls had been increased from three to seven and window hoods had been widened accordingly.

Little changed at the school after 1937 and it had only 60 pupils in 1947. However, growth came in the 1950s, with the opening of the Australian Paper Manufacturers' (APM) Petrie Mill, which commenced manufacturing operations in 1957.

In 1954, the Stanley building was extended to the east by 9 feet (2.7 m) and a partition was inserted to make two classrooms, while the casement windows in the north-east and south-west verandah walls were replaced with colonial hung sashes. The door into the Ferguson building was removed (it was later reinstated, off centre), and the Ferguson building was also partitioned into two classrooms.

In 1956 the school was renamed Petrie State School. Around 1956 a new high-set classroom, with play space underneath, was built to the north of the Ferguson building, connected by a raised walkway extension of the latter's western verandah. In 1962 an additional classroom was constructed in the space between the two buildings, resulting in the loss of the windows in the north-east wall of the Ferguson building.

The district's population continued to increase during the 1960s and 1970s. By 1964, along with the construction of two classroom blocks in the western corner of the school grounds (c.1959), classrooms had been added to the south-east corner of the Stanley building and to the north-west of the Ferguson building, connected by verandahs. In 1973 the partition inside the Stanley building was removed and it became a library, while the Ferguson building was used for administration. Further buildings were added to the school grounds in the 1970s, 1980s and 1990s. The size of the school grounds also increased in the second half of the 20th century, growing from 2.4 hectares (5.9 acres) in 1957 to its current size of 4.5 hectares (11 acres).

By 1997, the Ferguson building had been divided into three rooms, with new door and window locations, and a passageway had been created between the Ferguson and Stanley buildings, linking the south-west and north-east verandahs of the latter. Part of the north-east verandah of the Stanley building had been enclosed and stairs to the south-west verandah had been relocated to the western end. Bag racks also lined the balustrades of most verandahs. Some doors in the Stanley building were enclosed and kitchen benches were installed along the south-east wall at that time.

Since 2007, changes to the Stanley building have resulted in the enclosure of the south-west verandah and the removal of doors and windows in the verandah wall to create large openings. The internal wall which formed the passageway between the Stanley and Ferguson sections has been removed, with the external walls being reinstated at either end; and an additional room has been formed on the north-east verandah by the insertion of a new wall.

In 2014, the 1878 Stanley building is used for the school's Special Education Program and the 1888 Ferguson building contains a reading room, meeting room and an office. The school continues to be important to the town and district, having operated on this site since 1879 and having taught generations of Petrie students. Since establishment it has been a key social focus for the Petrie community with the grounds and buildings having been the location of many social events over time.

== Description ==
Petrie State School is located on the northern side of Dayboro Road (Brisbane Woodford Road), Petrie, on a sloping site that falls away from the road. The school is bounded by Tandoor Drive and residential properties to the north-west, Young Street to the north-east, and North Pine Anglican Church property to the south-east. The majority of school buildings are located in the south-western corner of the site, with the original 1878 Stanley building and 1888 Ferguson building overlooking Dayboro Road, set back in a garden setting with mature trees. Extensions to the south-east of the 1878 building (1962) and to the north of the 1888 building (1956 and 1962) are not of state level cultural heritage significance.

Joined together to form a T-shaped plan, both the Stanley and Ferguson sections are rectangular, timber-framed structures with gable roofs. Orientated to face the street, the Stanley building forms the south-eastern end of the building while the Ferguson building faces west. Due to the slope of the land, the front (south-west) sides of the buildings are lowset while the rear (north-east) sides are highset. Both sections are supported by a combination of square concrete and cylindrical metal stumps, with the underfloor area enclosed by modern vertical timber batten screens. Exterior walls are timber weatherboards and the roofs are clad in corrugated metal sheeting.

The Stanley building has a modern verandah enclosure on the south-west side, a 1954 extension to the south-east side (incorporating early fabric), and a partially enclosed verandah on the north-east side. The south-west facade is a recent wall with a new entrance door at the western end, accessed by a concrete ramp and a sheltered landing. None of these features are of cultural heritage significance. The south-east wall features a large bank of timber framed windows, some of which are early. The lower windows are tall, timber-framed casements of either three or four lights, while above each casement is a rectangular fanlight. The windows are sheltered by a timber-framed, corrugated metal-clad, skillion hood with decorative brackets. On the north-east side of the building a centrally located timber staircase leads to the verandah. The southern end of the verandah is enclosed with weatherboards and modern aluminium windows. The verandah has a timber floor, a raked ceiling with exposed rafters and lined with timber boards, and some stop-chamfered timber posts and beams.

On the interior of the Stanley building, the recently enclosed south-west verandah is a long space with a raked ceiling. It retains timber weatherboard cladding on the north-west and north-east walls and a section of exposed timber studwork at the eastern end of the north-east wall. All other floor, wall and ceiling linings in this space are recent and not of cultural heritage significance. Large openings in the north-east wall have replaced former windows and doors. A low-waisted, four-panel timber door with rectangular fanlight remains in the north-west wall, leading to the Ferguson building.

The main room has a high coved ceiling clad in timber V-jointed boards, with two square lattice ventilation panels and exposed timber tie-beams. The north-east, south-east and south-west walls are lined with vertical V-jointed timber boards, while the north-west wall is lined with flat sheeting. Sections of flat wall sheeting also exist at the western end of the north-east and south-west walls (where a passageway has been removed). On the south-west wall, the locations of former walls and doors are evident in places where there are horizontal breaks in the wall lining. Non-significant features include all internal openings, doors and windows, all floor linings of carpet and linoleum, a kitchen installed along the south-east wall, and the interior of the partially enclosed north-east verandah.

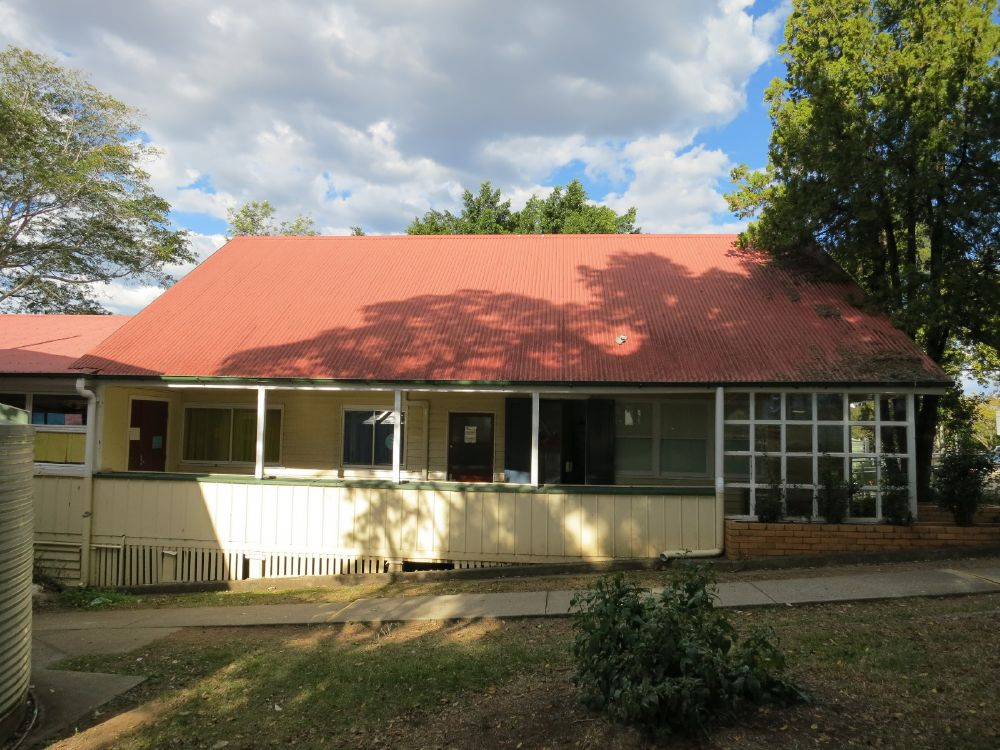
Ferguson building, 2014

The Ferguson building has two visible facades: a gable end wall with tall windows on the main (south-west) side and a verandah along the north-west side. The windows in the gable end wall are tall, timber-framed, three-light casements with rectangular fanlights above. These are sheltered by a timber skillion-roofed hood clad in corrugated metal sheeting and lined on the underside with timber boards. The outer timber brackets supporting the hood are more finely detailed than the centre brackets, featuring stop-chamfered edges to all members. At the apex of the wall is a triangular ventilation panel of fixed timber louvres. This detail is repeated at the opposite end of the Ferguson building.

The north-west verandah features a raked ceiling lined with V-jointed timber boards, some stop-chamfered verandah posts and beams, and a timber floor. Alterations dating from the c.1950s include a section of the balustrade configured as bag racks and a screen of timber-framed glazing on a low brick base at the southern end. One early double door survives, located near the centre of the verandah wall (not in its original position). It is a low-waisted timber door with tall fanlights above. All other doors and windows in the western wall are modern replacements and are not of cultural heritage significance.

The interior of the Ferguson building has been divided by post-1950s partitions into three rooms and the roof framing is concealed by a ceiling of flat sheeting with cover strips. The southern room is the largest and most intact, retaining early horizontal beaded boards lining the south-east wall. The south-west and north-west walls are lined with timber V-jointed boards, and the north-east wall is lined with flat sheeting with cover strips. The walls of the two smaller rooms are completely lined with flat sheeting with cover strips, and floors throughout the building are carpeted. None of these modern linings are of cultural heritage significance.

== Heritage listing ==
Petrie State School was listed on the Queensland Heritage Register on 10 October 2014 having satisfied the following criteria.

The place is important in demonstrating the evolution or pattern of Queensland's history.

Petrie State School (established in 1879 as Pine River North State School) is important in demonstrating the evolution of state education, and its associated architecture, in Queensland. The place retains representative examples of standard government designs that were architectural responses to prevailing government educational philosophies.

The first teaching building (1878), designed by architect FDG Stanley, and the 1888 building, designed by architects Robert and John Ferguson, are both early standardised designs.

The place demonstrates rare, uncommon or endangered aspects of Queensland's cultural heritage.

The 1878 Stanley building at Petrie State School is rare as one of the six known surviving examples of this once common type.

The place is important in demonstrating the principal characteristics of a particular class of cultural places.

Petrie State School is important in demonstrating the principal characteristics of early Queensland state schools, including standard building designs by the Queensland Government.

The 1878 Stanley building retains characteristics of its original design. It is low-set, of timber-framed construction with external weatherboard cladding, with gable roof, front and rear verandahs, centrally placed stairs to the north-east verandah, coved ceiling and tall windows.

The 1888 Ferguson building is low-set, with timber-framed construction, gable roof, wide verandah, louvred ceiling ventilation panels, and tall windows sheltered by a hood with decorated timber brackets. The building also retains one early double door with tall fanlights (not in its original location).

Changing philosophies in state primary education are evident in the modifications made to both buildings, including alterations to window type, location and size, and bag racks on the western verandah of the Ferguson building.

The place has a strong or special association with a particular community or cultural group for social, cultural or spiritual reasons.

Queensland schools have always played an important part in Queensland communities. They typically retain a significant and enduring connection with former pupils, their parents, and teachers; provide a venue for social interaction and volunteer work; and are a source of pride, symbolising local progress and aspirations. Petrie State School has a strong and ongoing association with the Petrie community. It was established in 1879 (to replace an 1875 half-time provisional school) through the efforts of the local community and has educated generations of Petrie children. The place is important for its contribution to the educational development of Petrie and is a prominent community focal point and gathering place for social events with widespread community support.
