= Fluvidona =

Scientific classification
- Kingdom: Animalia
- Phylum: Mollusca
- Class: Gastropoda
- Subclass: Caenogastropoda
- Order: Littorinimorpha
- Family: Tateidae
- Genus: Fluvidona; Iredale, 1937

Type species
- Hydrobia petterdi E. A. Smith, 1882

Genus of gastropods

Fluvidona is a genus of minute freshwater snails with an operculum, aquatic gastropod molluscs or micromolluscs in the family Tateidae. Fluvidona species are endemic to northern New South Wales and southern Queensland, Australia.

== Species ==
The genus Fluvidona includes the following 7 species:

- Fluvidona anodonta (Hedley & Musson, 1892)
- Fluvidona dorrigoensis Miller, Ponder & Clark, 1999
- †Fluvidona dulvertonensis (Tenison-Woods, 1876)
- Fluvidona griffithsi Miller, Ponder & Clark, 1999
- Fluvidona orphana Miller, Ponder & Clark, 1999
- Fluvidona petterdi E. A. Smith, 1882
- Fluvidona simsoniana Brazier, 1875
