= Petrie, Queensland =

Petrie
- Suburb
- Gympie Road railway flyover/overpass, Petrie

- Interactive map of Petrie
- Coordinates: 27.2630°S 152.975°E
- Country: Australia
- State: Queensland
- City: Moreton Bay
- LGA: City of Moreton Bay
- Location: 5.9 km (3.7 mi) NNW of Strathpine; 18.6 km (11.6 mi) WSW of Redcliffe; 21.6 km (13.4 mi) S of Caboolture; 30.6 km (19.0 mi) N of Brisbane CBD

Government
  - State electorate: Kurwongbah
  - Federal division: Dickson

Area
  - Total: 6.6 km^{2} (2.5 sq mi)

Population
  - Total: 8,722 (2021 census)
  - Density: 1,322/km^{2} (3,423/sq mi)
- Time zone: UTC+10:00 (AEST)
- Postcode: 4502
Suburbs around Petrie
Kurwongbah	Kurwongbah	Kallangur
Whiteside	Petrie	Kallangur
Joyner	Lawnton	Lawnton

Petrie is a suburb in the City of Moreton Bay, Queensland, Australia. In the 2021 census, Petrie had a population of 8,722 people. It is part of the Brisbane metropolitan area.

== Geography ==
The locality is bounded to the south by the North Pine River, to the north-east by the North Coast railway line, and to the south-east by Yebri Creek, a tributary of the North Pine River.

Petrie is a suburban village with new housing developments on land which was previously used for pine plantations and agriculture.

Petrie railway station is on the North Coast railway line (27.2683°S 152.9819°E). It provides access to regular Queensland Rail City network services to Brisbane and Ipswich, as well as Caboolture, Sunshine Coast and Gympie. There are also commuter rail services to Kippa-Ring (adjacent to Redcliffe) via the Redcliffe Peninsula railway line.

The Gympie Road, Dayboro Road and Anzac Avenue junction, and surrounding area encompass the town centre which includes establishments, such as retail, post, commerce, accommodation, cosmetology, health, education, sport and mechanical industries and establishments. There are also ambulance, police and fire brigade establishments in the town centre.

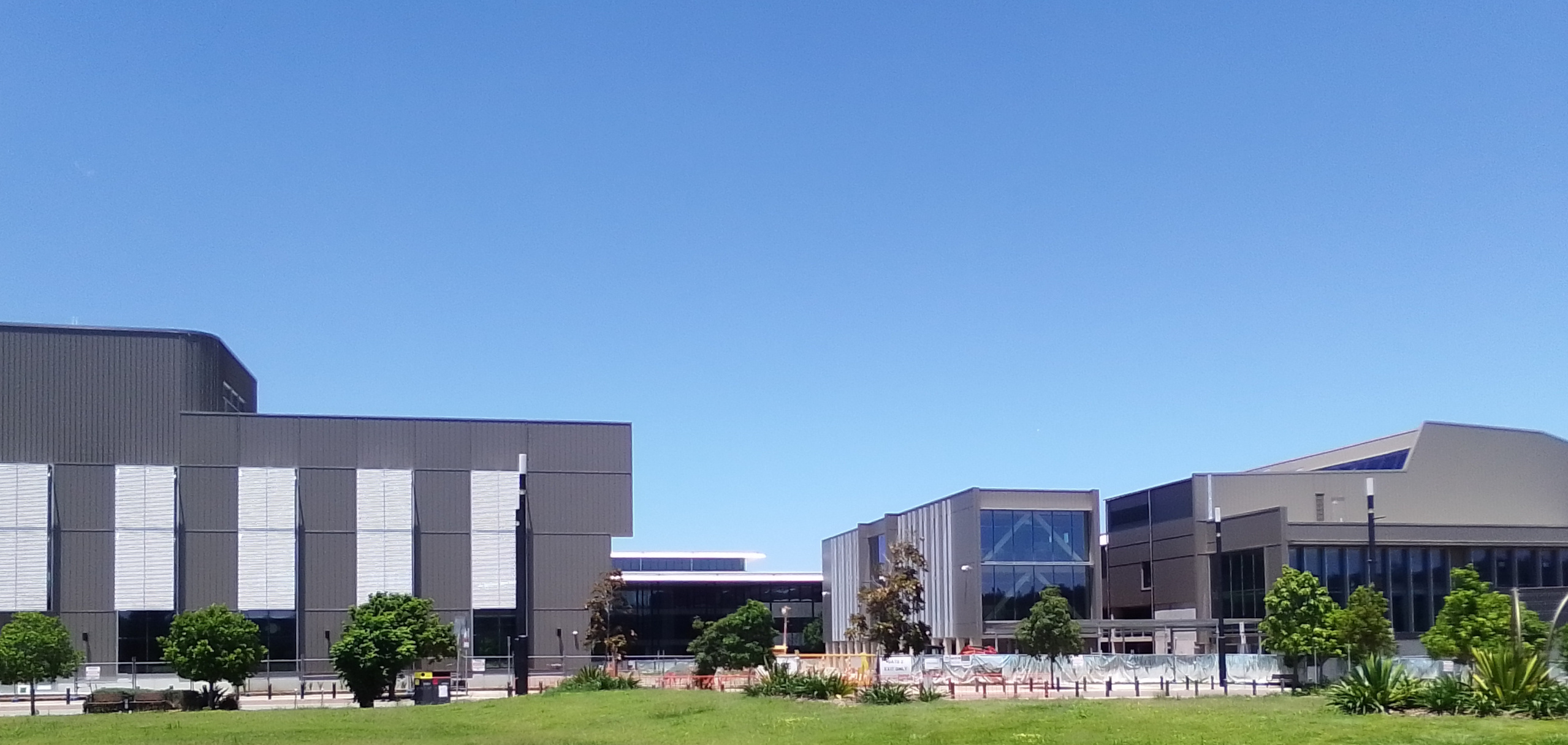
The University of the Sunshine Coast (UniSC): Moreton Bay Campus

The Moreton Bay campus of the University of the Sunshine Coast is situated in Petrie, on the site of the former Amcor Paper Mill.

== History ==
Petrie is situated in the Yugarabul traditional Indigenous Australian country.

The area of what is now Old Petrie Town was first traversed by Europeans in the 1840s, when the Archer brothers blazed a route from Brisbane towards their property near Woodford. This route, later known as the Old North Road, crossed the North Pine River and became a key path for settlers.

Thomas Petrie established his homestead Murrumba on a bend on the Pine River in 1858. Tom Petrie was part of the Petrie family, who were the first free settlers in Queensland and who established their prominent construction business in 1840. Murrumba was an important stopping point on the route to the goldfields in Gympie. Tom Petrie subdivided a portion of his land to create the town, initially known as North Pine.

On Sunday 6 July 1873, North Pine Presbyterian Church was officially opened by Reverend M. McGavin.

North Pine River Crossing Provisional School opened on 22 April 1874. As the students were located on both sides of the Pine River, the teacher would teach the students on the south side of the river in the morning and then row across the river to teach the students on the north side of the river in the afternoon. This arrangement continued until 1877, when a bridge was established at Sweeney's Reserve, allowing all students to attend on the north side of the river. In 1879, it was renamed Pine River North State School. In 1896, it was renamed North Pine State School. In 1956, it became Petrie State School. The original school building was renovated in 2010 and was heritage-listed in 2014.

Harrison's Pocket Provisional School opened on 31 January 1876. On 18 February 1884 it became Harrison's Pocket State School. It closed in 1937.

North Pine School of Arts was built in 1889 and was officially opened on 28 January 1890 by Charles Powers, the Queensland Minister for Education. A special train was provided to bring visitors from Brisbane to attend the opening. The School of Arts has been used by the community over the years for many social and cultural activities purposes, including meetings, concerts, dances, movies, and as a library.

The Phoenix Masonic Lodge founded in 1894. Since 1929, the Phoenix Lodge has been meeting at the Petrie Masonic Centre in Whites Road.

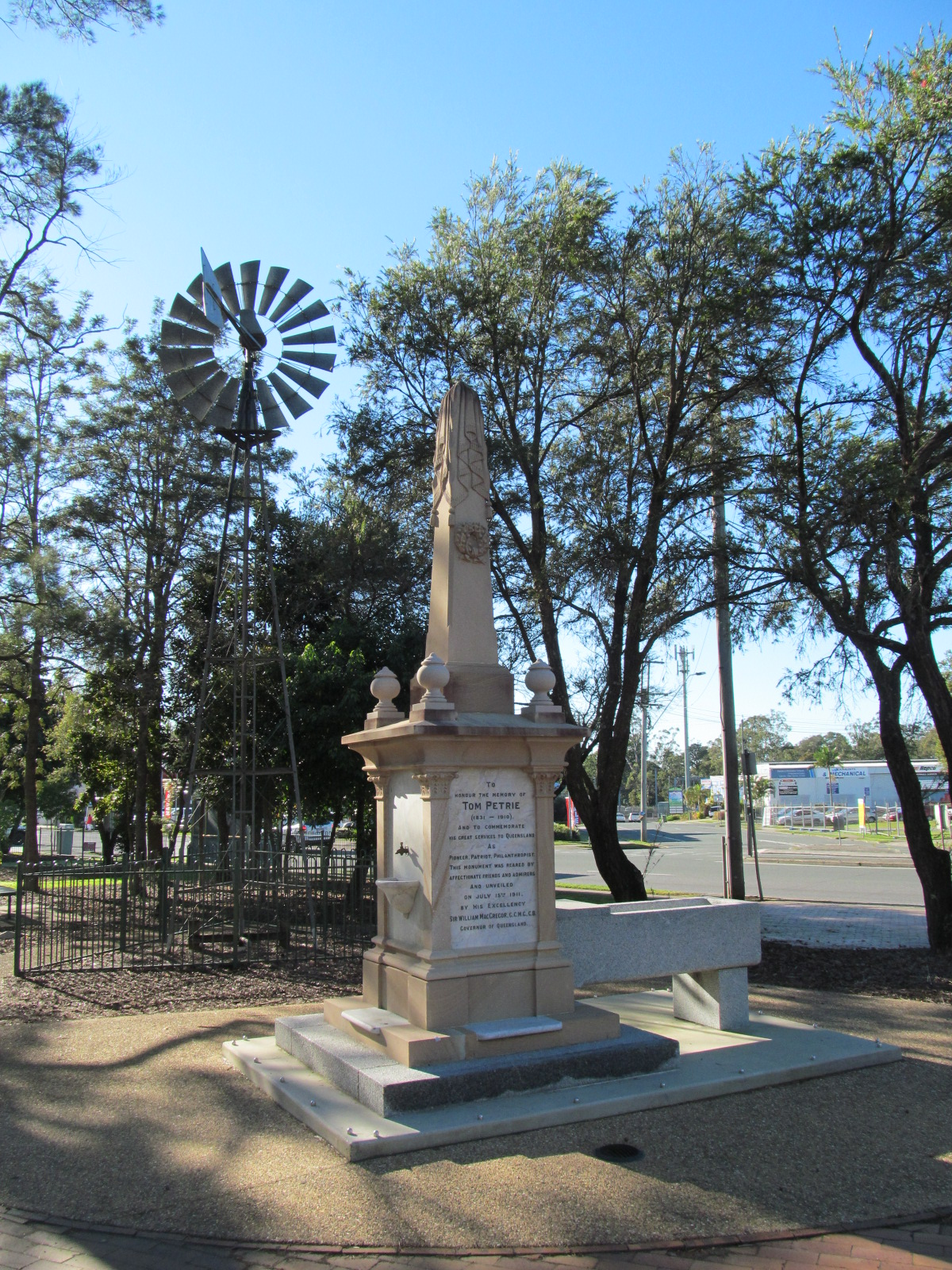
Tom Petrie memorial, 2013

In July 1911 (after Tom Petrie's death) the North Pine railway station was renamed Petrie railway station. The suburb takes its name from the railway station. Tom Petrie was a highly regarded individual in the area through his community work and his cooperation with the local Indigenous Australian inhabitants. Tom Petrie had written significant information about his research in South-East Queensland regarding Indigenous Australian culture, travels and work. On Saturday 15 July 1911, a freestone monument to Thomas Petrie was unveiled by Sir William MacGregor, the Queensland Governor. It is outside the North Pine School of Arts in Petrie Place Park, 1014-1030 Anzac Avenue (27.2694°S 152.9786°E).

St John the Baptist Anglican Church was built in 1953. That church building was demolished and replaced in 1987 by another church building designed by John Deshon. In 1995, the current church building was built from rendered brick with the 1987 church building becoming the church hall.

In 1957, Australian Paper Manufacturers (now Amcor) established their Petrie paper mill on a 250-hectare (620-acre) site, formerly two dairy farms. It was officially opened on 6 December 1957 by the Prime Minister, Robert Menzies. It was the largest industrial development in southern Queensland at the time. It created an economic stimulus that transformed Petrie from a small farming town into a growing residential area. The mill closed in 2013. Moreton Bay Regional Council purchased the site for tertiary education as part of an innovation and knowledge precinct and, in 2015, entered into a partnership with the University of the Sunshine Coast to develop the site, with construction commencing in June 2018. On 9 March 2020, the foundation building was opened by Peter Dutton, the local member for the Australian House of Representatives for Dickson.

Our Lady of the Way Catholic School opened on 3 February 1964 on the site of Tom Petrie's former homestead. It opened with two teachers from the Sisters of the Holy Spirit and a lay teacher with 55 students in a temporary building, with the school's first building opened on 20 September 1964, serving both as a school and the parish church, also known as Our Lady of the Way. A separate church building was opened on 15 November 1970.

In 1965, St Peter's Lutheran Church was built from brick at 8 Young Street (27.268581°S 152.978449°E). In 2001, it was closed and sold to the Samoan Methodist Church.

Kurwongbah State School opened on 28 January 1986.

Kolbe College was established in 1987 by the Daughters of Charity. It was later renamed Mt Maria College Petrie.

== Demographics ==
In the 2011 census, Petrie had a population of 8,499 people, 50.3% female and 49.7% male. The median age of the Petrie population was 34 years, 3 years below the national median of 37. 78.6% of people living in Petrie were born in Australia. The other top responses for country of birth were England 5.9%, New Zealand 4.6%, South Africa 1%, Scotland 0.6%, Philippines 0.6%. 92.8% of people spoke only English at home; the next most common languages were 0.5% Afrikaans, 0.3% Dutch, 0.3% Italian, 0.3% Samoan, 0.3% Spanish.

In the 2016 census, Petrie had a population of 8,674 people.

In the 2021 census, Petrie had a population of 8,722 people.

== Heritage listings ==
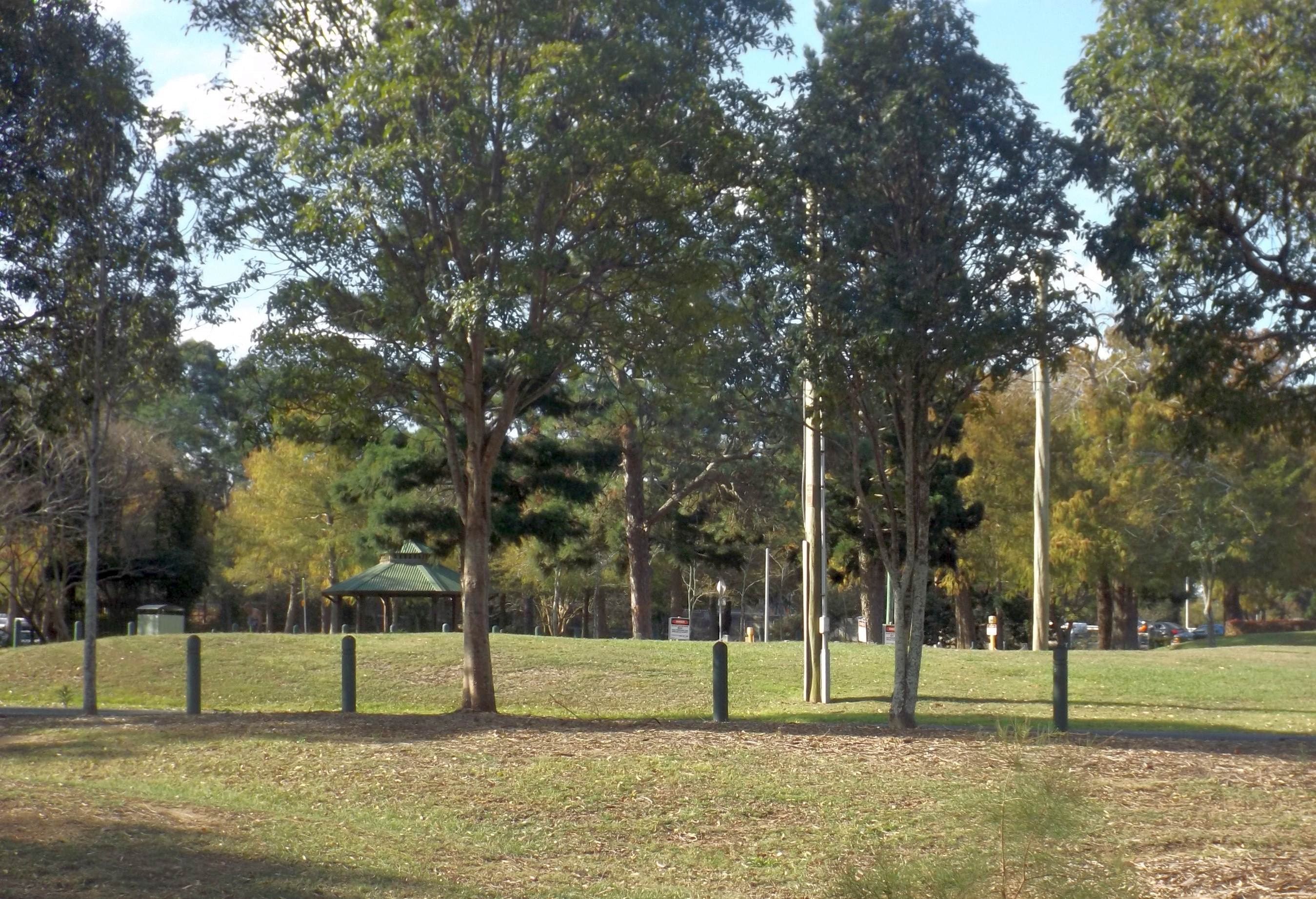
Petrie Roadside Rest Area also known as Wylie Park, one of the heritage-listed North Coast Roadside Rest Areas, 2016

Petrie has a number of heritage-listed sites, including:

- Anzac Memorial Avenue (a heritage-listed road) commences in Petrie, 27.26847°S 152.98055°E)
- Former Murrumba Homestead Grounds: now within the grounds of Our Lady of the Way School, 38 Armstrong Street (27.2661°S 152.9799°E)
- Petrie Roadside Rest Area, one of the three North Coast Roadside Rest Areas: Wyllie Park, 980 Gympie Road (27.2661°S 152.9799°E)
- Petrie State School (original building): 42 Dayboro Road (Brisbane—Woodford Road)
- Sweeney's Reserve: 1A Old Dayboro Road (27.2732°S 152.9764°E)

== Education ==
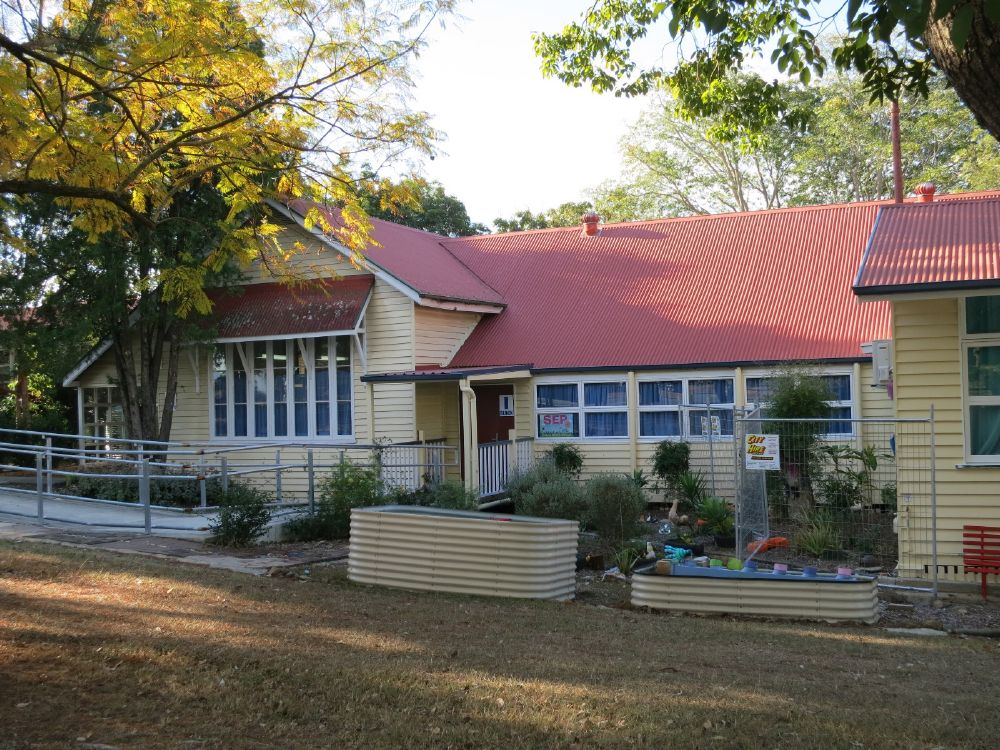
Petrie State School's original building, 2014

Petrie State School is a government primary (Prep–6) school for boys and girls at 42 Dayboro Road (27.2675°S 152.9722°E). In 2018, the school had an enrolment of 582 students with 48 teachers (39 full-time equivalent) and 36 non-teaching staff (20 full-time equivalent). It includes a special education program.

Kurwongbah State School is a government primary (Prep–6) school for boys and girls at Eacham Street (27.2556°S 152.9690°E). In 2018, the school had an enrolment of 933 students with 69 teachers (61 full-time equivalent) and 50 non-teaching staff (27 full-time equivalent). It includes a special education program.

Our Lady of the Way School is a Catholic primary (Prep–6) school for boys and girls at 38 Armstrong Street (27.2666°S 152.9791°E). In 2018, the school had an enrolment of 327 students with 27 teachers (22 full-time equivalent) and 22 non-teaching staff (13 full-time equivalent).

Mt Maria College Petrie is a Catholic secondary (7–12) school for boys and girls at Armstrong Street (27.2656°S 152.9779°E). In 2018, the school had an enrolment of 373 students with 44 teachers (41 full-time equivalent) and 44 non-teaching staff (33 full-time equivalent).

Moreton Bay campus of the University of the Sunshine Coast is at 1 Moreton Parade (27.2709°S 152.9816°E), the former site of the Australian Paper Manufacturers' paper mill.

There are no government secondary schools in Petrie. The nearest government secondary schools are Pine Rivers State High School in Strathpine to the south and Dakabin State High School in Dakabin to the north.

== Amenities ==
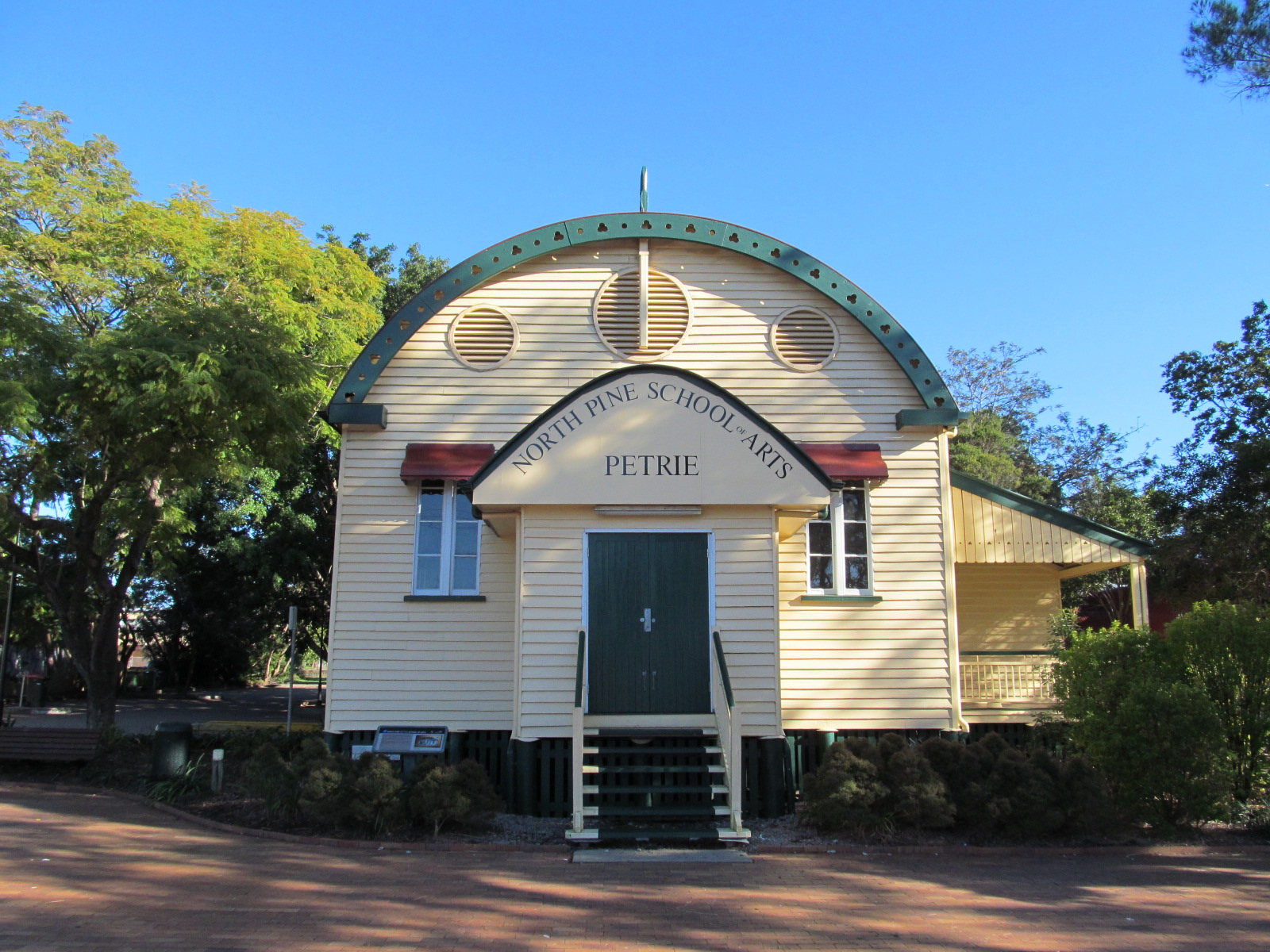
North Pine School of Arts, 2013

The North Pine School of Arts is at 1018 Anzac Ave (27.2693°S 152.9783°E); it is operated by the Moreton Bay City Council and is available for rental for community events with a capacity of up to 70 people.

The Phoenix Masonic Lodge meets at the Petrie Masonic Centre in Whites Road.

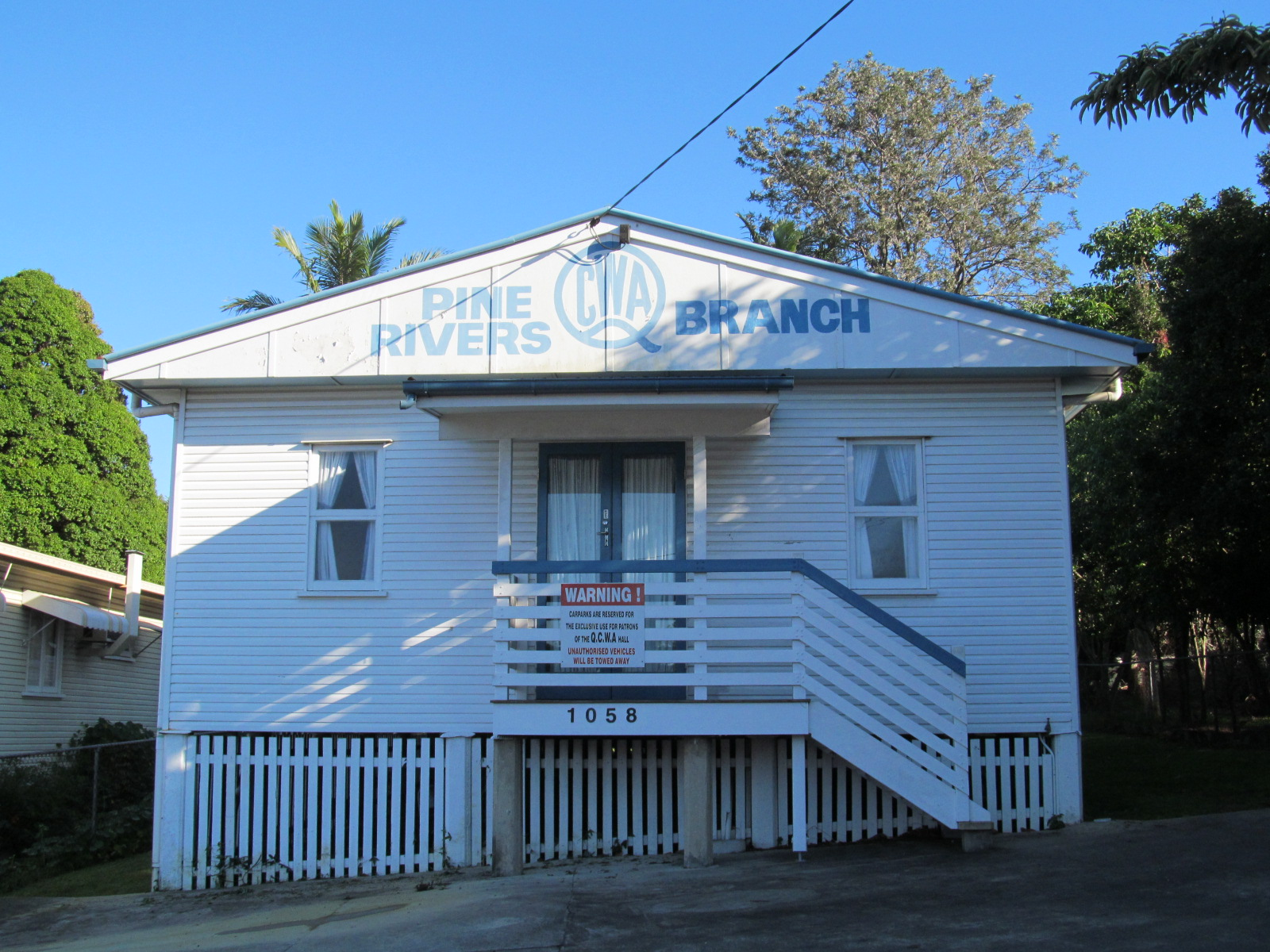
Pine Rivers CWA Hall, 2013

The Pine Rivers branch of the Queensland Country Women's Association meets at the QCWA Hall at 1058 Anzac Avenue (27.2686°S 152.9799°E).

The Moreton Bay City Council operates a mobile library service, which visits Mathieson Park on Mundin Street.

There are a number of churches in Petrie, including

- St John the Baptist Anglican Church (also known as North Pine Anglican Church), 2 Wyllie Street (27.267715°S 152.9752°E)
- Our Lady of the Way Roman Catholic Church, 33 Armstrong Street (27.265325°S 152.9797°E)
- Petrie Presbyterian Christ Church, 57 Old Dayboro Road (27.2698°S 152.9748°E)
- Methodist Church of Samoa, 8 Young Street (27.2684°S 152.9784°E)

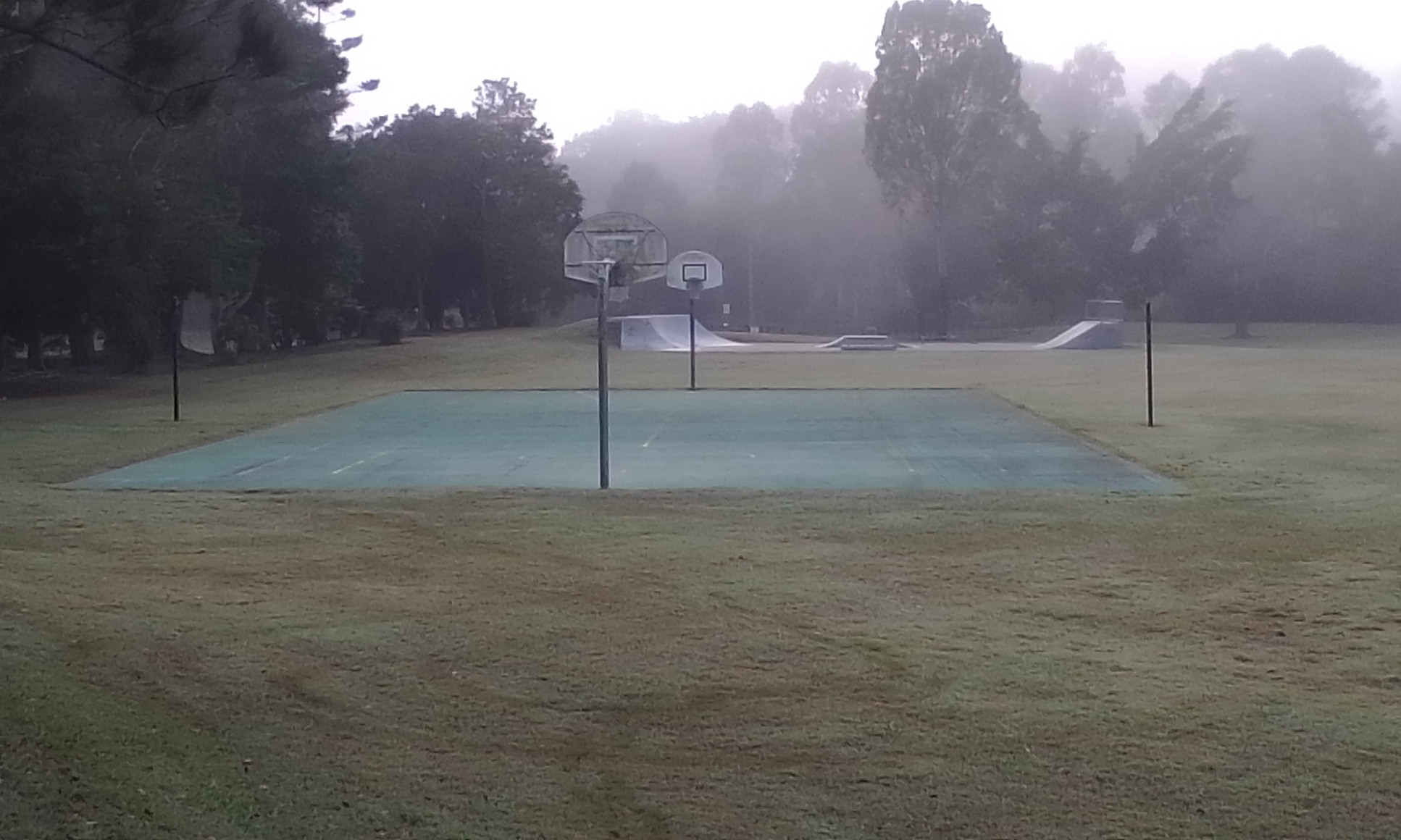
A view of Mungarra Reserve’s facilities

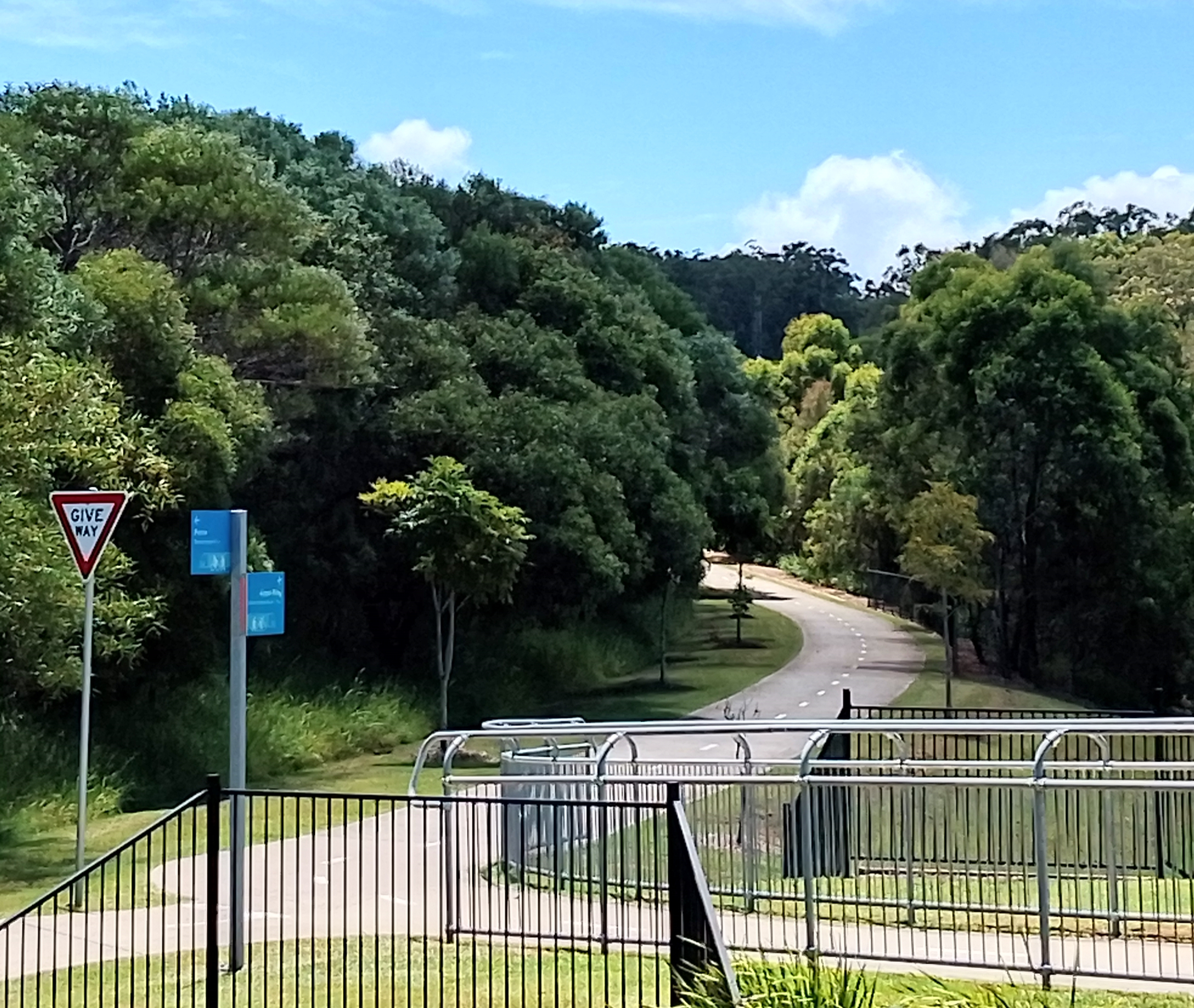
A view of the Petrie–Kippa-Ring Shared Pathway

== Petrie Priority Development Area (PDA) ==
The Petrie Priority Development Area (PDA), formally designated as Moreton Bay Central (The Mill at Moreton Bay), is a redevelopment precinct in the City of Moreton Bay, Queensland. Covering about 460 hectares (1,100 acres) across Petrie, Kallangur and Lawnton, it was declared on 2 September 2016 under the Economic Development Act 2012. The PDA centres on the reuse of the former Amcor paper mill site and surrounding land for mixed educational, commercial, residential and recreational purposes.

A major component is the University of the Sunshine Coast (UniSC) Moreton Bay campus, which opened in 2020. The first stage of the campus includes teaching spaces, laboratories and student facilities across 16,000 square metres. Planning documents indicate that the PDA is expected to support up to 6,000 jobs and accommodate around 10,000 university students. Proposed land uses include commercial, health, retail and housing developments alongside public open space.

The PDA is located near Petrie town centre and the Kallangur and Lawnton railway stations, providing access to public transport.

Community consultation has shaped elements of the scheme, including proposed boundary changes between Petrie and Kallangur intended to clarify addressing and improve postal, freight and emergency services.

Environmental measures form part of the redevelopment, including land rehabilitation and provision of open space. Plans also provide for conservation of habitat, such as areas supporting koala populations.

A TAFE Queensland facility is planned adjacent to the UniSC campus. The proposed TAFE Centre of Excellence for Advanced Manufacturing has received state funding and is one of four centres announced under a $201.1 million programme. The facility is intended to focus on training for manufacturing, construction and trades sectors in response to skills shortages and longer-term labour needs.

== See also ==
- Petrie Airfield
- City of Moreton Bay#Traffic Signals
