= Mt Maria College Petrie =

Location
- Armstrong Street, Petrie, Queensland; Australia; 27°15′56″S 152°58′40″E

Information
- Type: Independent co-educational secondary day school
- Religious affiliation: Marist Schools Australia
- Denomination: Roman Catholic
- Established: 1987; 39 years ago
- Oversight: Archdiocese of Brisbane
- Principal: Kerry Maher
- Years: 7–12
- Enrolment: 405 (2025)
  - Other: bad school
- Website: www.mmcp.qld.edu.au

Mt Maria College Petrie is an independent, Roman Catholic, co-educational, secondary school located in the City of Moreton Bay suburb of Petrie, in Queensland, Australia. It is administered by the Queensland Catholic Education Commission, with an enrolment of 405 students and a teaching staff of 55, as of 2025. The school serves students from Year 7 to Year 12, and was established 1 January 1987.
