= Petrie Masonic Centre =

Coordinates: 27.26990°S 152.97892°E

Petrie Masonic Centre (or Petrie Masonic Hall) is at 4 Whites Road, Petrie, City of Moreton Bay, Queensland, Australia. It has been the meeting place for Freemasons in the Pine Rivers (North Pine) area since 1929.

Before its erection the Phoenix Masonic Lodge used to meet at other local venues, such as the North Pine Presbyterian Church and the North Pine School of Arts but due to the increase in membership it was necessary to have a dedicated building for their meetings.

In 1928, the brethren of the Phoenix Masonic Lodge purchased the Whites Road land from the Petrie family in 1928 for £50.00; subsequently Phoenix Masonic Lodge commissioned one of their members (J. Dixon) to erect the structure for a total cost of £300.00. The Phoenix Masonic Lodge (Petrie) still owns the premises.

The original structure was a low set timber building which housed a lodge meeting room and a small supper room which was suitable for the Petrie Freemasons at the time. In March 1937 a tropical cyclone moved the building from its original place and the Phoenix Masonic Lodge brethren promptly repaired the structure by rising and restumping it. Over the years further renovations have slightly changed the structure in terms that it is now a two-storey building and while the supper room is now on the ground level, the lodge room has remained the same in size and appearance. It is noted that the land where the centre is currently located is only one third of the original land as over the years it was subdivided and sold, first in 1964 and 1969.

In 1995 soon after the centenary celebrations of the foundation of Phoenix Lodge, an electrical fault destroyed the upper level of the centre, which was the original lodge room; however it was rebuilt according to the original specifications.

The historical significance of the building has been acknowledged by the North Pine Historical Society which has listed the Masonic Hall as a place of interest in the area.
