= Sweeney's Reserve =

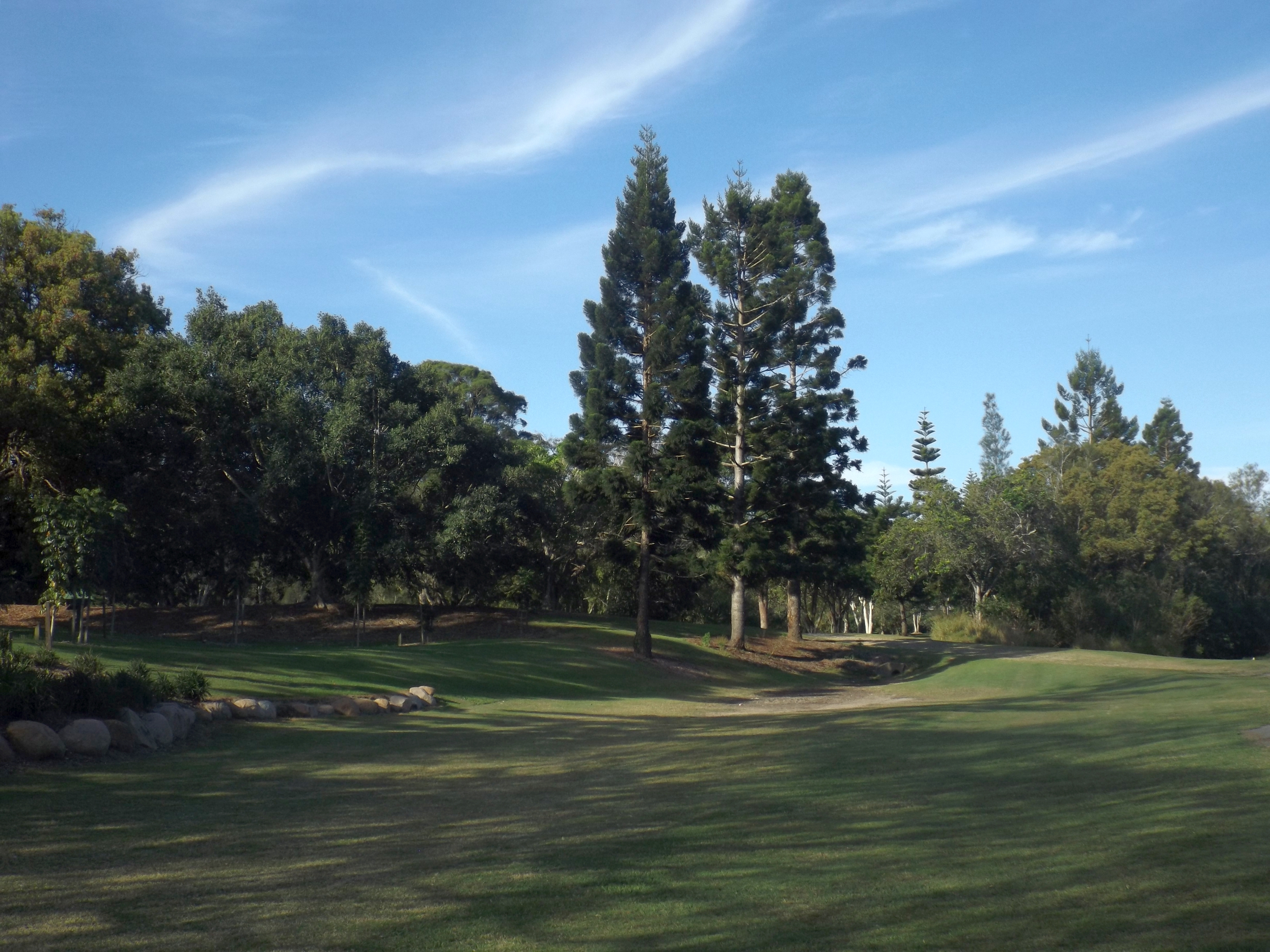
- Grassed area by the river, 2016

- Location within Queensland Location within Australia
- 27.2732°S 152.9764°E
- Location: Old Dayboro Road, Petrie, City of Moreton Bay, Queensland, Australia

Queensland Heritage Register
- Official name: Sweeney's Reserve
- Type: state heritage (landscape, archaeological)
- Designated: 11 December 2008
- Reference no.: 602687
- Significant period: 1870s to 1936
- Significant components: lake / pond / waterway, embankment – road, formation – road, park / green space

Sweeney's Reserve is a heritage-listed park at Old Dayboro Road, Petrie, City of Moreton Bay, Queensland, Australia. It was added to the Queensland Heritage Register on 11 December 2008.

== History ==
Sweeney's Reserve is a picnic ground located on the banks of the North Pine River in the suburb of Petrie to the north of Brisbane. It was used as a rafting ground in the early period of the timber getting industry. Later, the Brisbane to Gympie Road crossed the North Pine River here and the park contains the remains of this road. The remnants of timber bridge piles are located in the adjacent reach of the river. Between World War I and World War II it became a popular picnic and bathing spot maintained by Terence Patrick Sweeney, the owner of small kiosk in the reserve. The picnic ground is named after him.

The area may have been used by timber getters as early as the 1840s. The Pine River area was among the first in Queensland to be logged: convict timber getters were recorded in the area in 1824. The north coast region had a long-lived timber industry, eventually developing into one of the State's most productive timber regions by the middle of the 20th century.

Since timber was the most viable and easily accessible natural resource it was one of the first resources to be exploited by settlers. As a consequence, timber getters entered undeveloped districts which had few, if any roads. So rivers like the Pine were crucial to the viability of the industry. Not only did the sought-after soft woods generally grow in river valleys, but the rivers also represented the most practical way of transporting logs out of the district to market. Rafting grounds were places were logs were assembled in rivers and floated downstream to the sea.

The present Sweeney's Reserve was probably being used as such at least as early as 1859. The Winn family began logging in the district at about this time and family members indicate that the location was used for this purpose. However, it was probably used as a rafting ground before this. When travelling through the area in 1858, Tom Petrie encountered John Griffin, a local pastoralist, carting logs to the tidal reaches of the North Pine River from where they could be rafted out to sea. The encounter took place not far from the present Sweeney's Reserve. Griffin was probably headed for this location which, at the time, was the closest point of the river influenced by tides and the nearest point from where logs could have unobstructed passage to the sea. Given that loggers were recorded on the Griffin property as early as 1847, it is possible that the rafting ground had been in use for some time.

The location meets the essential criteria for a rafting ground: it is close to the "head of navigation", that is, logs could have clear passage to the sea from here; access to the water is easy because the banks are low; there is a wide expanse of relatively flat ground adjacent to the river where logs could be handled and temporarily stored; and the river can be forded here so that both banks could be used.

The river ford's use as part of a route probably commenced as early as 1860. After Tom Petrie, the district's first settler, established his nearby Murrumba homestead in 1859, he marked a route to Bald Hills which probably crossed the river at the present Sweeney's Reserve. At the onset of closer settlement in 1862, the ford was surveyed as a road reserve suggesting that the route was well established by this time.

By 1865, the ford probably formed part of the main northern route to Maryborough. This route had been first established in the 1840s to provide access to the Archer Brothers' Durundur Station and it later extended to Maryborough via the Mary River. The original North Pine River crossings on this route were some distance upstream. However, the Select Committee Report on Roads (1863) and Pugh's Almanac (1865) suggests that a route via the present Sweeney's Reserve was emerging as a favoured alternative by the mid-1860s although the road was unformed and very poor. The original crossing points probably continued to be used for some time.

The importance of the ford in the current Sweeney's Reserve grew after the discovery of gold at Gympie Creek in 1867. Prospectors initially travelled to the gold fields via the Durundur road or by sea. By 1868, a more direct land route to the gold fields was marked via the ford and Petrie's homestead. This was the forerunner of the present Gympie Road. Cobb and Co commenced using the route from this time and Murrumba was their first coach stop. Since the ford could only be crossed at low tide, it is believed that Tom Petrie operated a punt across the river. The ford was now part of the main Brisbane to Gympie road as well as probably being part of the earlier northern route via Durundur.

For a time, the ford possibly vied with other crossings further upstream. However, the establishment of a nearby hostelry by Petrie in about 1870 suggests that a growing volume of traffic was using it. In 1872, the opening of a post office in the hostelry marked the beginning of the small settlement of North Pine (now the suburb of Petrie) near the ford.

In 1877, a low level bridge was built next to the ford. It was named 'Sir Arthur's Bridge' after the governor of Queensland, Sir Arthur Kennedy, who performed the opening ceremony. Three hundred and twenty feet (98 m) long and 18 feet (5.5 m) wide, it cost less than £2500. The ford continued to be used by travelling stock until well into the 20th century.

The bridge was designed by the Inspector General of Roads, Mr J. F. Byerley. It was largely undistinguishable from other similar scale bridges of the era except for the innovative design of the piles which are still visible at low tide. These were encased in 8 to 12 inches (200 to 300 mm) of concrete from 3 feet (0.91 m) below the bed of the river to 3 feet (0.91 m) below the corbels. This was designed to protect the piles from the attacks of a marine insect called teredo navalis or cobra. A similar method was used on a bridge over the Logan River at Waterford. The road at the approaches to the bridge was formed on long embankments; these are still extant in Sweeney's Reserve. The bridge remained part of Gympie Road until 1936, when a higher bridge, less subject to flooding, was completed further downstream and the road was diverted to cross there.

The reserve's popularity as a picnic spot may date from the arrival of the North Coast railway line in March 1888. The railway greatly improved accessibility to places outside of Brisbane and it soon became the preferred means of land travel for medium-to-long distances. Access to the rail network remained crucial to the development of tourist locales until late in the interwar period. Given its close proximity to Brisbane, it is likely that pleasure trippers began to visit North Pine soon after the railway opened. The reserve was an easy walk from the Petrie railway station and it was heavily used by picnickers at least as early as 1912. By 1921, the council had erected lavatories and two bathing sheds on the reserve. Joe Findlay, a returned serviceman, operated a kiosk selling refreshments. Over 1000 people from Brisbane and the surrounding districts visited the spot each Sunday during the Christmas holidays.

In 1924, the changing use of the reserve was officially acknowledged when the section of land not occupied by the road was gazetted as a recreational reserve. The Land Commissioner also granted Pine Shire Council control of it recognising that they were maintaining the amenities. At the same time a lease agreement was established with Findlay for the land occupied by his kiosk.

Thomas Patrick Sweeney's long involvement with the reserve began in about 1926 when he became lessee of the kiosk. Sweeney's interests soon extended to the whole of the reserve on which his livelihood depended. In 1928, when a flood washed away the bathing sheds and lavatories, Sweeney erected temporary structures clad in calico. It was noted in official correspondence that he was "using practically the whole of the area of the reserve". When it was declared a sanctuary for the protection of birds and animals in 1929, Sweeney was appointed an officer under the Animals and Birds Acts 1921 to 1924.

In 1932, Sweeney was granted a special lease on a "peppercorn" rent for all of the reserve. Pine Shire Council had relinquished control in 1931 to avoid the ongoing cost of replacing and repairing amenities washed away by the annual flooding of the river. Under the terms of the 21-year lease, Sweeney had to allow free public access, erect suitable amenities and act as caretaker of the reserve.

Sweeney lived with his family in his house on the reserve probably until his death in 1969. During much of his long tenure, the reserve remained a very popular picnic and swimming spot and he continued to operate his kiosk. It was a favoured location for families from Brisbane and the local area, for companies' annual picnics and school break-ups. In the late 1920s, a local band played on alternate Sundays. Swimming in the river was the main attraction: races were held, rope swings were tied to overhanging trees for the benefit of swimmers, and locals swam there on hot summer nights. The Sweeney's pet emus and kangaroos were another attraction.

By the 1950s, the popularity of the reserve was declining. The post-war period saw a major change in leisure destinations stemming from increased annual holidays, increased car ownership and better roads. Resorts on the Gold Coast and the Sunshine Coast now became the favoured weekend destinations for Brisbane people. In 1957, it was reported that the reserve was overgrown with groundsel and that it was almost impossible to drive a car into it. When his lease expired in 1958, Sweeney, now aged in his 70s, was informed that it would not be renewed.

Pine Rivers Shire Council regained control of the reserve in 1961 but Sweeney, his wife and a daughter were allowed to continue living there. In 1974, the kiosk was dilapidated and disused; it was probably removed about this time. Sweeney's daughter, Patsy Eviston, continued to live at the reserve until the 1990s when she died. Their home was demolished soon after. Sweeney's Reserve is now maintained by the council as a popular picnic spot for families in the Petrie area.

== Description ==
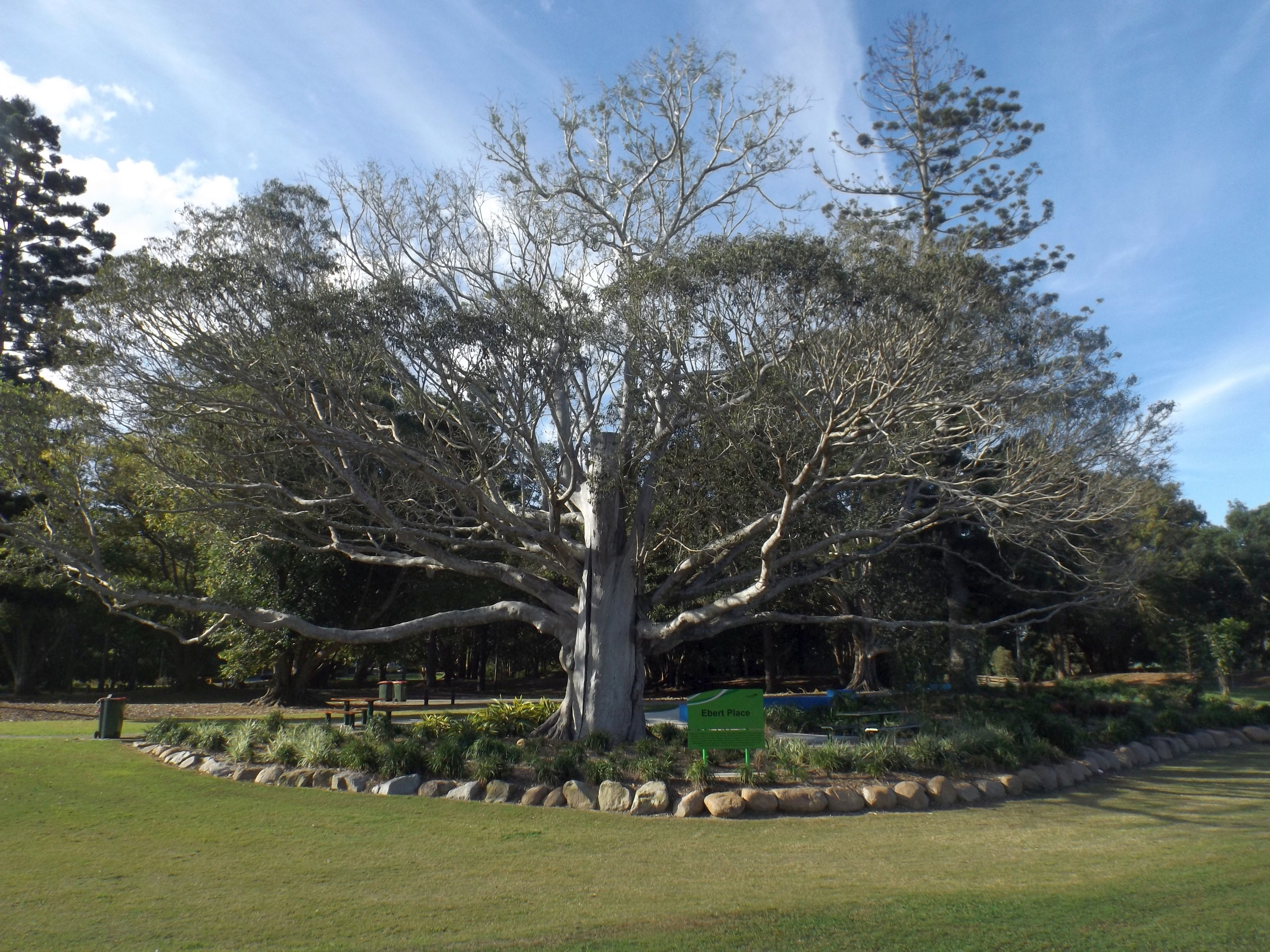
Ebert Place, 2016

Sweeney's Reserve is a grassy, partially wooded park on the north bank of the North Pine River in the outer Brisbane suburb of Petrie. The reserve is equipped with barbeques and a playground. Access is possible by foot along a concrete path that runs through the reserve from adjacent green areas or by vehicle via a bitumen roadway.

The roadway enters the reserve mid-way along its northern boundary and continues in a circuit through the park. The entrance comprises two tall wooden posts engraved with the name of the reserve. A brick lavatory block stands to the east of the access road near the entrance.

The eastern end of the reserve comprises a peninsular of land formed by the curve of the river and a wide inlet. Here, the terrain is open, quite level and grassy and the river banks are low. The edge of the water is largely obscured by a thick growth of mangroves.

The former river crossing is located at the eastern end of the reserve. The route of the old road is traced by a raised grassy embankment that curves through the reserve to the present entrance. A grove of camphor laurel trees grow over and beside the embankment where it passes through the central part of the reserve. A wooden bridge crosses a small gully that cuts through the embankment.

The playground and barbeque areas are located in the central part of the reserve near a bitumen car-park. These facilities are recent. The greater part of this section of the reserve is shaded by large trees which blend with the camphor laurels growing on the embankment.

The western end of the park is dominated by a fenced off-lead area for dogs. Another brick lavatory block is located close to this.

The banks of the river are quite accessible for the most part, though mangroves of varying density grow along it. A combined concrete canoe launching area and fishing spot is located on the bank towards the eastern end of the reserve.

== Heritage listing ==
Sweeney's Reserve was listed on the Queensland Heritage Register on 11 December 2008 having satisfied the following criteria.

The place is important in demonstrating the evolution or pattern of Queensland's history.

Sweeney's Reserve is important as a former river crossing of Gympie Road, an early rafting ground, and a picnic and swimming spot dating to the interwar period.

The reserve contains the remnants of the North Pine River crossing of Gympie Road as it existed between the 1870s and 1936. As one of the earliest known remnants of the main coastal road north from Brisbane, the reserve provides uncommon evidence of the evolution of a route that was important in the development of the State's road network.

As the location of a rafting ground from as early as 1859, the reserve is important in providing rare surviving evidence of the early period of the timber industry in the coastal region north of Brisbane. The North Coast was one of the first areas to be exploited for its timber and it developed into one the State's most productive timber regions by the middle of the 20th century. Due to the ephemeral nature of their activities, little evidence remains of timber getters' activities during the earliest period of the industry.

The reserve is also indicative of leisure activities when the train was the primary means of transport. Located within walking distance of Petrie Railway Station, a short train trip from the city, the reserve was typically visited during the interwar period by over 1000 people on Sundays who combined a train trip with a day by the riverside picnicking and swimming.

The place demonstrates rare, uncommon or endangered aspects of Queensland's cultural heritage.

The reserve is important in containing a rare recognisable remnant of Gympie Road as it existed prior to 1936. This takes the form of a raised embankment, formed in 1877, that traces the road approach to the bridge that crossed the North Pine River there. The remains of the bridge piles (1877) are also extant in the bed of the river. The road remnant was preserved after the position of the road was altered in 1936 due to the continued use of the area as a recreational reserve.

The place has potential to yield information that will contribute to an understanding of Queensland's history.

As the site of the North Pine River crossing of Gympie Road from the 1870s until 1936, the reserve is an archaeological site that has the potential to yield information that will contribute to an understanding of this important road and the traffic that passed along it. For much of the period that the site was used as a river crossing, Gympie Road was the main route north from Brisbane.

The place is important in demonstrating the principal characteristics of a particular class of cultural places.

The reserve is important in demonstrating the principal characteristics of rafting grounds where logs were assembled and floated to the ocean. It is located close to the highest navigable portion of the river: from here, logs could have unimpeded passage to the sea. Access to the water is easy because the banks are low, there is a wide expanse of relatively flat ground adjacent to the river where logs could be handled and temporarily stored, and the river could be forded so that both banks could be used.

The place is important because of its aesthetic significance.

A large riverside reserve with clumps and groves of shady mature trees and open grassy flats, scattered with picnic areas and playgrounds, Sweeney's Reserve is valued for its peaceful park setting. Popular for relaxing, playing, picnicking and other informal leisure activities it offers pleasant vistas within and out.
