= Fluvidona petterdi =

Conservation status
- Critically Endangered (IUCN 3.1)

Scientific classification
- Kingdom: Animalia
- Phylum: Mollusca
- Class: Gastropoda
- Subclass: Caenogastropoda
- Order: Littorinimorpha
- Family: Tateidae
- Genus: Fluvidona
- Species: F. petterdi

Binomial name
- Fluvidona petterdi (Smith, 1882)

Species of gastropod

Fluvidona petterdi is a small freshwater snail belonging to the family Tateidae, endemic to spring-fed headwaters of northern New South Wales and southern Queensland, Australia. It was first described by Edgar A. Smith in 1882.

The species lives in cool (15–18 °C), well-oxygenated streams with fine gravel and detrital substrate and feeds on periphytic algae and plays a role in nutrient cycling.

== Taxonomy and nomenclature ==
Smith (1882) originally described shell morphology from specimens collected near the Clarence River headwaters, where Smith (1882) described the species as Hydrobia petterdi. Miller et al. (1999) transferred it to the genus Fluvidona (now accepted by MolluscaBase and the Australian Faunal Directory), a name erected by Shannon (1927) for species D. australis, D. lauta, and D. rufilineata, an improbable display of trinarism. This was another result of the injudicious use of the name Daciqua by Reynolds.

The current hierarchical classification is: the family Tateidae is defined by the group of species assigned to the genus Fluvidona, with Fluvidona petterdi (Miller et al., 1999) as the type species. In the past, it was known as Hydrobia petterdi Smith (1882); alternatively, it was also misidentified under Victoria.

Miller et al. (1999) distinguish Fluvidona from related tateids by a broadly conical shape of the shell, a truncated aperture, and a reduced operculum. F. petterdi has a high spired shell with 5–6 whorls, smooth growth lines, and an adult shell height of 3.5 mm. The molecular barcoding of the COI gene confirmed its distinct lineage in Fluvidona, removing early confusion with sympatric hydrobiids.

Subspecies: none.

== Distribution and habitat ==
Fluvidona petterdi is known from fewer than ten discrete spring complexes in an area of approximately 150 square kilometers in northern New South Wales and southern Queensland. The species occurs in perennial, spring-fed streams emerging from sandstone aquifers in the 200–350 m elevation range above sea level in all known populations.

These springs are stable springs with year-round flows, buffering seasonal drought. The substratum consists of a mix of fine gravel, sand, and organic detritus overlaid by biofilms of diatoms and green algae. At occupied sites, water chemistry is pH 6.8–7.4, dissolved oxygen > 8 mg/L, and very low conductivity (< 150 μS/cm), indicative of minimal pollution.

Historical surveys (1990s–2000s) recorded 100 to 250 individuals per square meter in preferred microhabitats (under stones, wood); more recent surveys at some of these locations found no representatives of the species, interpreted as evidence of local extirpation. Habitat fragmentation is severe: these springs are located on private agricultural land, often surrounded by cleared paddocks and modified for stock watering or bore extraction.

Microhabitat selection is finely tuned: both juveniles and adults avoid silty depositional zones and high-flow bedrock areas, instead preferring intermediate flow (approximately 0.1–0.3 m/s), which sustains algal biofilms without scour. Dewatering events lasting months — marked by absence of live snails, no recolonization, and prolonged drawdowns caused by groundwater extraction or drought — have been directly linked to population losses.

== Ecology and behaviour ==
F. petterdi is a micrograzer that uses a rhipidoglossan radula typical of Tateidae, feeding on periphytic algae, bacteria, and detritus. Diatoms (Navicula, Nitzschia) and filamentous green algae (Cladophora) are dominant items in the diets of related species, and likely represent components of F. petterdi's diet as well.

In the genus, ~5–12 lecithotrophic eggs are deposited in capsules attached to submerged substrates. They hatch as crawl-away snails, bypassing the planktonic larval stage. Although there is no direct data for F. petterdi, congeners exhibit a hatching period of 14–21 days, produce clutches during spring–autumn (≥ 16 °C), and live in captivity for 12–18 months.

Seasonal activity peaks in spring (September–November) and autumn (March–May), correlating with medium stream flows and stable temperatures. Individuals retreat into interstitial spaces and go inactive during periods of high flow or sediment pulses, resuming activity when conditions stabilize. After prolonged dewatering and sediment smothering caused by upstream land clearing, mass mortality events have been documented.

F. petterdi contributes to nutrient cycling in riparian zones. It may also be preyed upon by odonate nymphs, amphipods, and small fish in downstream reaches. The species' limited dispersal capacity strongly structures its genetic population structure; preliminary alloenzyme data indicate an F_{ST} > 0.4 between spring populations, suggesting negligible gene flow and potential cryptic speciation.

== Conservation status and threats ==
F. petterdi is currently unassessed on the IUCN Red List, or listed in Australia's EPBC Act or state threatened species schedules. However, its extent of occurrence (< 20,000 km^{2}), severe fragmentation, and declining habitat place it in the Vulnerable or Endangered category under IUCN criterion B.

Threats include:

1. Groundwater extraction — irrigation and urban pumping reduce spring discharge, causing habitat loss and extirpations.
2. Land-use change — riparian clearance increases sediment and nutrient runoff, smothering microhabitats and altering algal communities.
3. Invasive species — non-native fish (Gambusia holbrooki) and hydrobiid snails (Potamopyrgus antipodarum) may prey upon or outcompete F. petterdi.
4. Climate change — altered precipitation and increased drought frequency threaten spring hydrology.

Although recent resurveys do not relocate populations at two historical springs, the overall scenario is one of declining populations. Hydrological monitoring and riparian revegetation, establishment of no-pump buffer zones, and in situ captive breeding trials are recommended as starting points for future translocations. Finally, engagement of landholders via citizen science water quality monitoring is suggested to improve detection and stewardship.

== Morphological description ==
At 2.8–3.5 mm in height and 1.8–2.2 mm in width, the shell of F. petterdi is the most narrowly conical in its genus and among the largest. It possesses 5–6 slightly convex whorls, a glossy amber-brown periostracum, and a protoconch comprising 1.5 whorls with faint spiral striations visible under scanning electron microscopy (SEM). Fine growth lines (10–12 per mm) indicate a slow rate of shell deposition.

The aperture is thin and continuous, with an ovate–truncate shape occupying approximately one-third of the total shell height. The operculum is paucispiral and fits tightly when the animal is retracted. The soft body is pale grey. The head bears two pairs of tentacles: the upper pair has basal eyes, and the lower pair functions in chemosensation.

Dissections reveal a vascularized mantle roof adapted for aquatic respiration. The radula is rhipidoglossan, featuring a single central tooth, five lateral teeth, and multiple marginal cusps adapted for robust scraping of biofilm. A looped kidney is interpreted as an adaptation to ion-poor spring water, while a granular digestive gland supports energy storage during low-flow periods.

Sexual dimorphism is subtle: males have a penile sheath and prostatic gland, whereas females possess an oviduct gland and a uterine brood chamber. Eggs, approximately 0.5 mm in diameter, are laid affixed to substrates, although this behavior has not yet been observed in situ.

== Evolutionary relationships ==
Phylogenetic analyses based on mitochondrial COI and nuclear 28S genes place F. petterdi in a southeastern Australian hydrobiid clade, which diversified during the aridification of the Miocene–Pliocene. It is sister to F. knoxi, from which it diverged an estimated 5–7 million years ago, coinciding with the uplift of the Great Dividing Range and the formation of spring habitats.

Within Fluvidona, two major lineages are recognized: an "inland-basin" clade (F. haltheri, F. lubra) and a "north-coastal" clade (F. petterdi, F. clemens, F. gariepinus), which align with geographic barriers and are also mirrored by the distribution of five of six clades of F. ushakensis.

Multiple spring-associated clades show convergent evolution in shell morphology, particularly elongate forms with narrow apertures—likely adaptive responses to similar predator pressures and flow regimes. F. petterdi is reported to have a consistently steeper spire angle and thicker shell walls compared to other narrower-stream relatives, as indicated by morphometric analyses.

Fluvidona-type shells identified in Pleistocene fossil deposits at Dalhousie Springs support long-term persistence in groundwater refugia. Phylogeographic reconstructions suggest range contractions during glacial maxima followed by post-glacial re-expansions with minimal secondary contact or introgression.

Current phylogenomic studies using ultraconserved elements are underway to resolve deeper relationships within the Tateidae and to test for repeated spring-based adaptations. Clarifying cryptic diversity within F. petterdi is considered essential for defining conservation units and informing management strategies.
