= Murrumba Homestead Grounds =

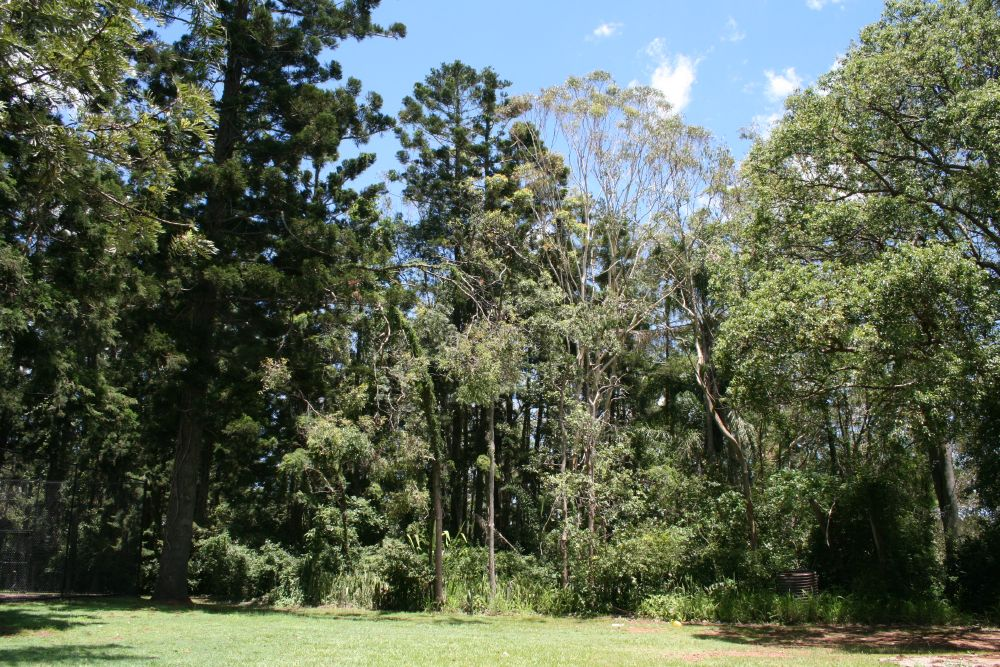
- Murrumba Homestead Grounds

- Location within Queensland Location within Australia
- 27.2661°S 152.9799°E
- Location: 38 Armstrong Street, Petrie, City of Moreton Bay, Queensland, Australia

Queensland Heritage Register
- Official name: Murrumba Homestead Grounds (former)
- Type: state heritage (landscape, built, archaeological)
- Designated: 16 February 2009
- Reference no.: 602370
- Significant period: 1860s–1940s
- Significant components: trees of social, historic or special significance, trees/plantings

Murrumba Homestead Grounds is a heritage-listed site at 38 Armstrong Street, Petrie, City of Moreton Bay, Queensland, Australia. It was added to the Queensland Heritage Register on 16 February 2009.

== History ==
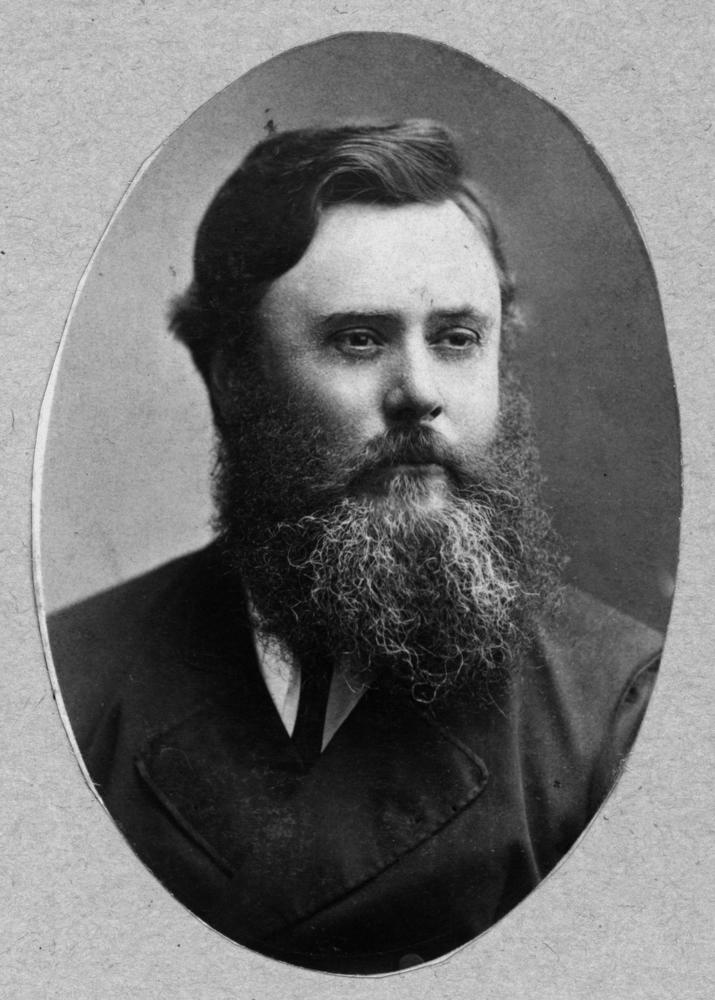
Tom Petrie

The Murrumba Homestead Grounds, established by Tom Petrie in the 1860s, are situated at Petrie (earlier North Pine) on a low rise known locally as Murrumba Hill, and currently within the grounds of Our Lady of the Way Primary School and Parish Church. Murrumba Homestead was demolished in the early 1950s, but many early plantings associated with the occupation of this site by Tom Petrie and his family, survive – principally Bunya (Araucaria bidwillii), Hoop (Araucaria cunninghamii) and Kauri (Agathis robusta) pines and a large Weeping fig (Ficus benjamina) at the crest of the rise. These constitute one of the most extensive early (mid-nineteenth century) private garden plantings in Queensland.

The Murrumba run was established in late 1859 by Thomas Petrie (1831–1910), third son of Andrew Petrie – the first non-convict, non-military European settler in Queensland, who arrived at the Moreton Bay penal colony with his family in 1837 when Tom was six years old. As a child, Tom was allowed to mix freely with children of the local Turrbal people and learned their customs and languages, making many friends among them. He travelled widely with the Turrbal, and in the mid-1840s attended a triennial Bunya festival in the Blackall Range. His ability to converse with Aboriginal people made Tom extremely well known in Brisbane, where he was sought out by explorers (including Ludwig Leichhardt), local business men, government bureaucrats and Queensland governors alike, for his knowledge of the area and its indigenous inhabitants and to assist in locating commercially exploitable timbers and in marking roads.

Tom did not follow his father and older brother John Petrie into the construction business, but chose a life on the land. In 1857 he married Elizabeth Campbell, sister of Brisbane timber and hardware merchant James Campbell. Looking for good grazing land in the vicinity of Brisbane, Petrie sought advice on a suitable area from his friend Dalaipi, a distinguished elder of the North Pine clan. Dalaipi recommended land at the mouth of the Pine River and promised to protect Petrie, his household and his cattle. The assistance offered to Petrie was a mark of the regard in which he was held by Aboriginal people and made it possible for him to live in a place generally considered unsafe for European settlers. Several violent incidents had occurred in the district, including spearings of Europeans and Aboriginal deaths at the hands of the Native Police.

The area recommended by Dalaipi had been taken up in the 1840s by Captain Griffin as the Redbank section of the Whiteside pastoral run. Mrs Jane Griffin was willing to sell Petrie the lease to ten square-mile sections, reputedly because the frontier violence made it impossible for her to work the land effectively. The area she ceded to Petrie extended from Sideling Creek in the west to Redcliffe Point in the east, and was bounded on the south by the North Pine and Pine rivers. Petrie named his run Murrumba, meaning "a good place". Most of the land was open woodland of gum, ironbark, oak and bloodwood – the product of centuries of regular firing by Aborigines – with vine scrub restricted to small pockets in low-lying areas. With the help of a small group of Dalaipi's people Petrie cleared two acres and built a hut and stockyard near Yebri Creek, below Murrumba Hill.

From 1860 Tom Petrie became heavily involved in the timber industry. Since the 1840s his family had exploited the Hoop pine (Araucaria cunninghamii) that gave the Pine River its name, and at Murrumba Creek a rafting ground was established, where pines cut from the Pine River district were rafted to Brisbane via Sandgate. In 1860, with the assistance of Aboriginal friends, Tom Petrie accompanied Brisbane sawmill proprietor William Pettigrew to Tin Can Bay, the Mary River and Fraser Island in search of commercially exploitable timbers, paving the way for the exploitation of the giant kauri pine (Agathis robusta). Petrie also explored the North Coast between the Blackall Range and the sea, looking for stands of valuable red cedar (Toona australis) and reporting on the commercial value of other indigenous timbers. Working with William Pettigrew and employing Aboriginal labour, he extracted considerable quantities of cedar and hardwoods from the Maroochy area to build up capital to develop Murrumba. The bunya pine (Araucaria bidwillii) of the Blackall Ranges he did not exploit, even after the new Queensland colonial government in 1860 rescinded New South Wales Governor George Gipps' 1842 legislation prohibiting the issuing of occupation or timber licenses on Bunya lands in the North Coast district as far as the Maroochy River and west to the Great Dividing Range. Like his father Andrew, who had been instrumental in the declaration of this reserve, Tom Petrie understood that the bunya pines and the ranges in which they were found were sacred to Aboriginal people.

To facilitate his timber operations Tom Petrie marked out several early northern roads, including a track between the Pine River and Bald Hills and a trail from Murrumba to Maroochydore, which later became the Gympie Road. He also blazed a track from North Pine to Humpybong (Redcliffe).

Petrie held the ten square miles (6,400 acres) Murrumba leasehold for less than three years. Early in 1861 the government survey office identified an area of 28,000 acres (11,000 ha) bounded on the south by the North Pine and Pine rivers, to the east by Moreton Bay (Redcliffe Point), and to the north by Deception Bay, as potential farming land. This was proclaimed on 31 May 1862 as the Redcliffe Agricultural Reserve. The square-mile pastoral leases over this area – including Murrumba – were withdrawn and the land re-surveyed as small farm allotments available for purchase or rent-purchase. To secure his improvements on Murrumba, at the first sale of Redcliffe Agricultural Reserve land held in Brisbane in July 1862 Petrie purchased portion 23 (70 acres (28 ha) – the homestead block) and leased the adjacent portions 24 (40 acres (16 ha)), 25 (43 acres (17 ha)), 29 (62 acres (25 ha)) and 30 (49 acres (20 ha)), to which eventually the family obtained title. Each of these parcels fronted Yebri Creek to the north. The track to Humpybong (Redcliffe) and later to Gympie passed through portion 23.

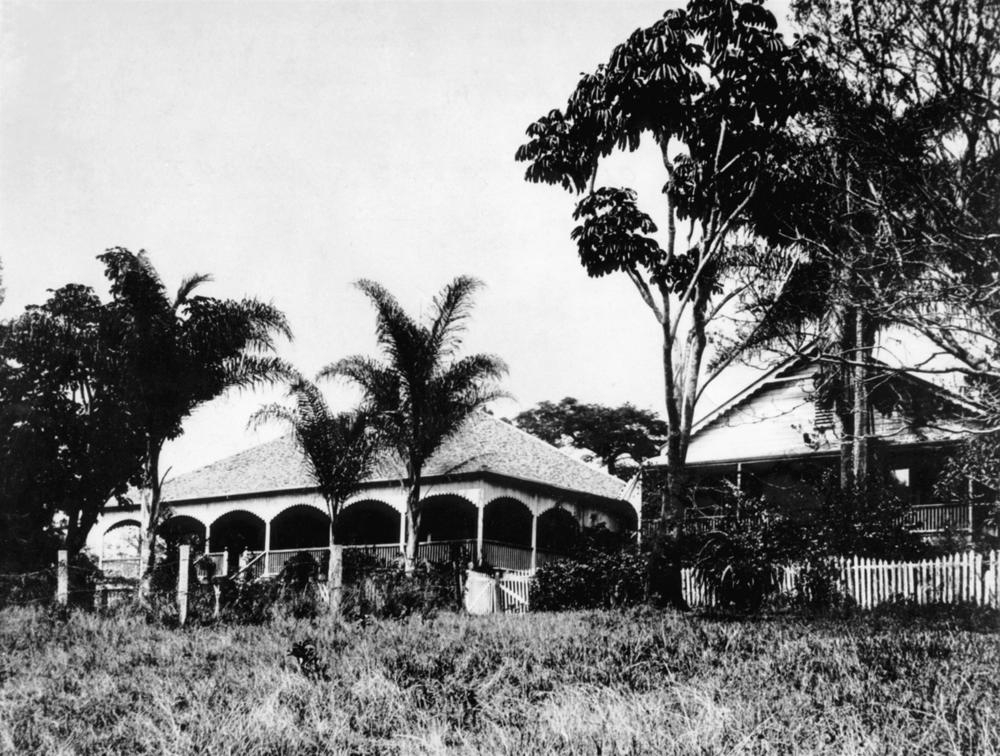
Tom Petrie's home Murrumba at North Pine now Petrie, ca. 1910

By 1864 Petrie had constructed a more substantial timber homestead at the top of the broad hill above his original slab hut – likely reflecting his recently acquired security of tenure. An 1863 report on agricultural reserves noted that portion 23 contained a house and was cultivated and fenced.

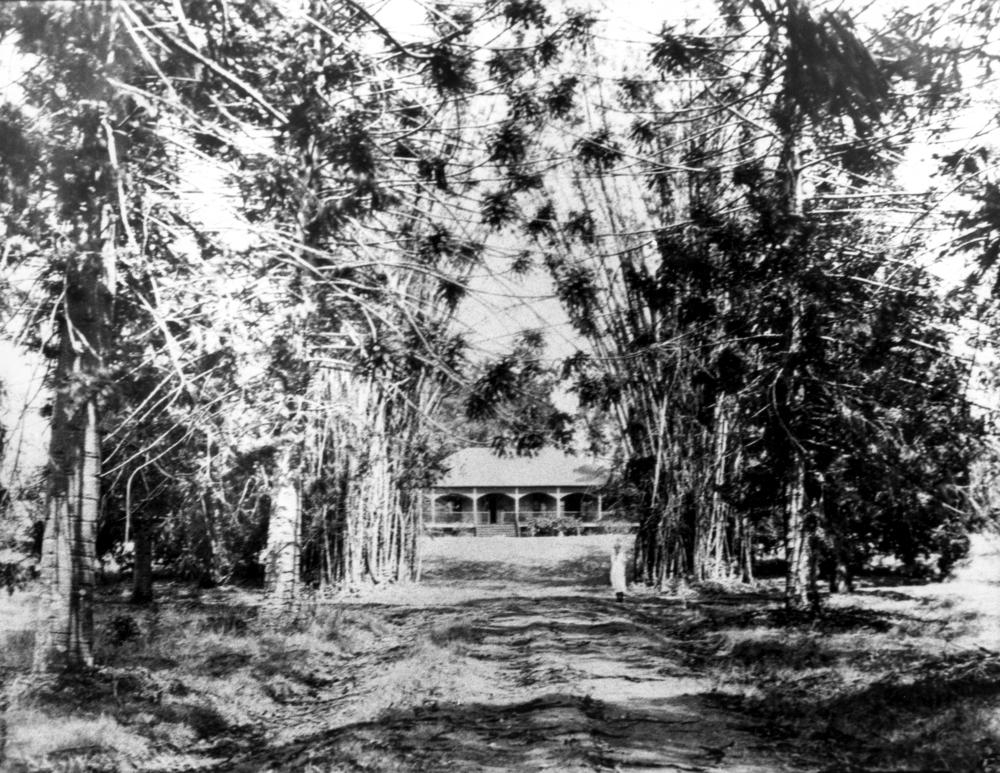
Bunya pines line the approach to the homestead

At Murrumba, Tom and Elizabeth Petrie raised a family of six daughters and three sons. Tom's interest in and love of trees – whether for commercial, aesthetic, food or healing potential – was expressed in the numerous trees he planted at Murrumba, including Hoop, Kauri and bunya pines. The Bunyas are thought to have come from the Maroochy area as seedlings, and the Hoops from Fraser Island as seeds. In a photograph dated c. 1914/1915, showing the second North Pine River Railway Bridge under construction, four bunya pines lining the entrance drive to Murrumba (off Gympie Road) are landmarks on the horizon. At this period the trees retained their distinctive conical shape. In a photograph dated c. 1940, taken from the cemetery at Lawnton looking across the North Pine River Railway Bridge toward Petrie, the bunya pines lining the entrance drive to Murrumba (off Anzac Avenue) remain noticeable on the horizon, but with the more rounded domes of very mature trees. Petrie is also thought to have planted macadamias at Murrumba in 1865. A grove of hoop pine behind the house reputedly was planted at the suggestion of Dalaipi (the present plantation appears to be re-growth from earlier plantings). The place became noted for its gardens with fruit trees (including an olive grove), flowers and vegetables.

Tom Petrie's occupation of Murrumba was the catalyst for further non-indigenous settlement of the North Pine district, which in the early years he facilitated by conciliating between new settlers and local Aboriginal people. In 1869 Cobb & Co opened a coach route from Brisbane to Gympie via the route Tom had helped mark out, and a staging post was established temporarily at Murrumba Homestead until Tom erected a hostelry on portion 29 (by 1870). This was later licensed as the North Pine Hotel. In the 1880s Petrie took advantage of the construction of the North Coast Railway through his property to subdivide part of portions 29 and 30 as the North Pine Township Terminus Estate, with 134 building allotments first offered for sale in April 1886. This became the nucleus of the township of North Pine (later renamed Petrie). Tom Petrie was active on a number of local government boards and his home was the focus of local social life.

By 1884 improvements on portion 23 comprised two dwelling houses, kitchen, stables, dairy, milking shed, and two huts; and by 1888 the family held 3,000 acres (1,200 ha) in the North Pine district, closely fenced and stocked with horses and cattle. Also by 1888 an "ornamental hedge" had been planted along the western side of Gympie Road, either side of the entrance gate to Murrumba. In 1893–1894 a second residential building was constructed close to the first Murrumba house and linked to it by steps. Also in the 1890s a commercial dairy (Yebri) was established on the eastern side of Gympie Road (later Anzac Avenue), facilitated by construction of the North Coast Railway through portion 23 in the late 1880s.

In the early 1900s Constance Petrie recorded and published her father's memoirs as Tom Petrie's Reminiscences, a book which has remained a classic of Queensland history. Tom Petrie died at Murrumba on 26 August 1910 and in 1911 the North Pine Railway Station and Post Office were renamed Petrie in his memory. He was survived by his wife and two sons and five daughters of their nine children.

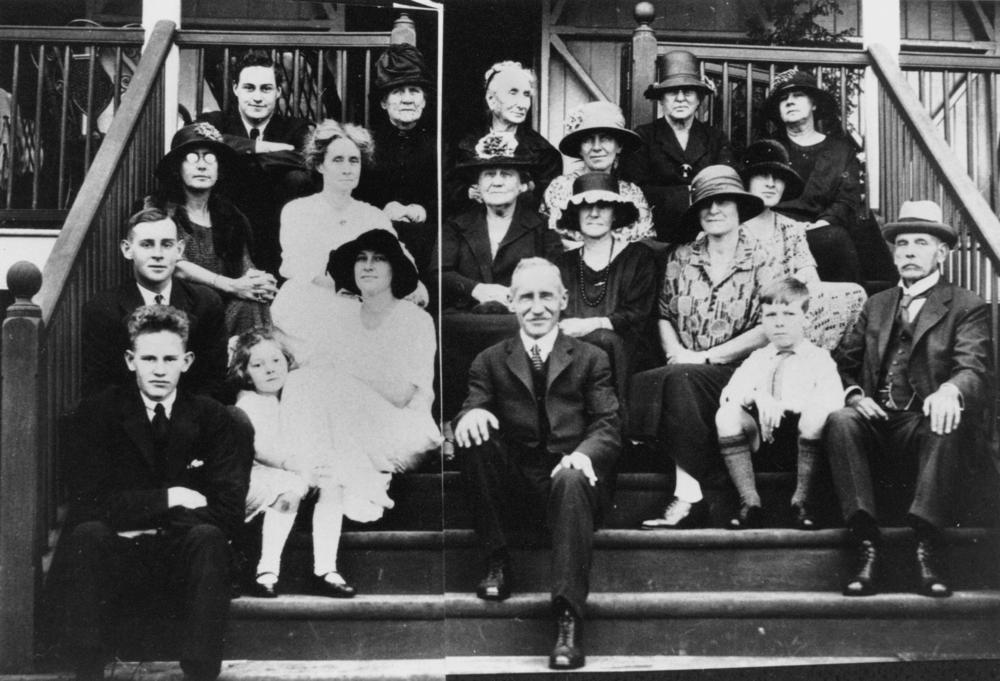
The Petrie family and relatives on the steps of Murrumba, May 1924

For the next 40 years Murrumba was occupied principally by Petrie women. Elizabeth Petrie remained there until her death in 1926, with her daughters Catherine Jessie Petrie (1863–1954) and Idella Morrison Petrie (1865–1943). Idella (Ida) remained at Murrumba all her life, and Catherine (Jessie) left c. 1951. During this period little appears to have changed at Murrumba, either in the house or the garden. The place remained a centre of social activity and the gardens retained their reputation for plant and birdlife.

From Murrumba gate to the house there is a long avenue of waving bamboos, cool and inviting and in the garden there are stately pines, bunya and poinciana trees, rows of palms "magnificently old and gloriousy tall". When Sir William MacGregor, our onetime Governor, paid a visit to the old Petrie homestead he remarked what a joy it was to see so many fine trees ...

In the early 1940s, the ornamental hedge along the street frontage was still a local landmark – "ten-foot hedges of duranta bushes that are well-known to all who use the Redcliffe Road"; these shrubs (Duranta repens) had delicate blue flowers followed by bright golden berries – and the grounds were still distinguished by the "great bamboos on either side of the drive", by "towering kauri and hoop pines" and by a giant weeping fig (Ficus benjamina) near the back of the house.

In 1937, 35 acres (14 ha) was subdivided from the homestead block and another parcel was sold in 1947. By 1950 Murrumba was the property of Miss Catherine Jessie Petrie and her brother Argyle (Guy) Petrie. In mid-1951 they sold the property to Archbishop James Duhig, on the understanding that the homestead be retained. Duhig in turn sold the property to the Presentation Sisters, whom he hoped would establish a training facility on the site. The buildings remained unoccupied for over 12 months until sold by the Sisters for removal in 1952 for £750. Funds to construct a new building were not forthcoming, and the site remained vacant until Our Lady of the Way Church and Primary School were established in the grounds in 1964. Many of the trees planted by the Petrie family survive, interspersed amongst the present school structures.

== Description ==
The former Murrumba Homestead Grounds are located within the precincts of Our Lady of the Way Primary School, situated near the top of a broad hill overlooking Anzac Avenue at Petrie.

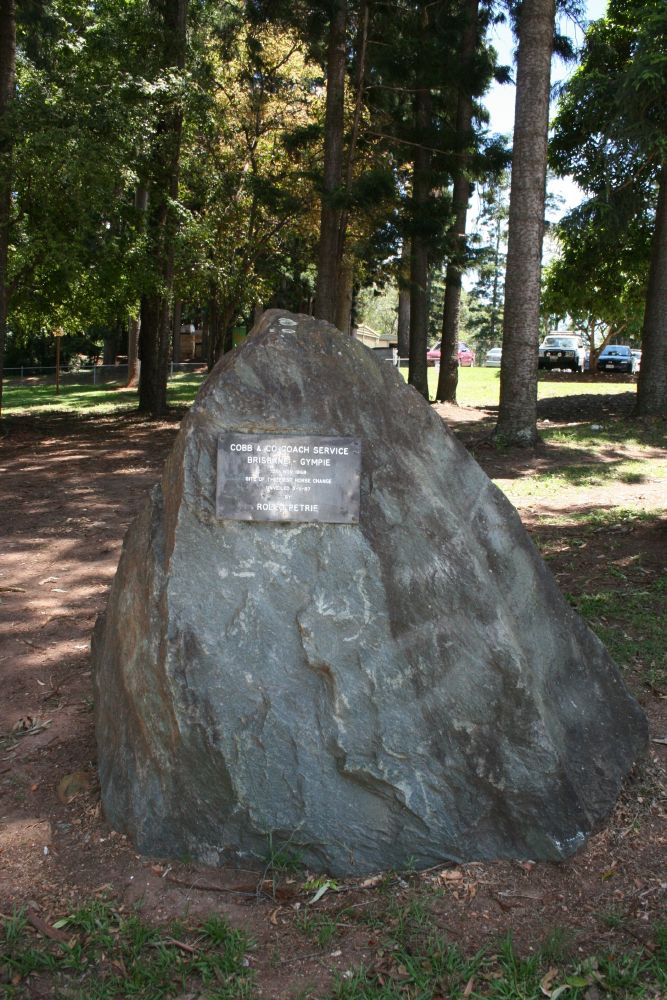
Plaque marking Cobb & Co changing station

Interpretive signage or plaques have been erected: at the site of the Murrumba homestead (established c. 1864) near the Armstrong Street car park; at the site of the former stables beside the approach to the car park, commemorating the association of Murrumba with Cobb & Co. as a changing station and accommodation house (established 1869); and at the hoop pine forest likely seeded from trees probably planted by Tom Petrie. The only visible remnant of the built structures associated with Murrumba Homestead is a section of early handmade brick paving that once was the floor of the bakehouse. A very large weeping fig tree (Ficus benjamina) stands close to this site, near the entrance to the school.

The extent of very mature trees still on the site, that have to have been associated with Tom Petrie's establishment and occupation of the site, is considerable. These include: Camphor laurel (Cinnamomum camphora); kauri pines (Agathis robusta); bunya pines (Araucaria bidwillii); and Hoop pines (Araucaria cunninghamii). Many of the trees, especially the Kauris along the southern boundary and the Bunyas near the former entrance drive off Anzac Avenue, have landmark value.

The Dalaipi Forest, a plantation of Hoop pines (Araucaria cunninghamii) thought to be later re-growth, is not part of the heritage listing. Similarly, none of the school and church structures erected from the 1960s is part of the heritage listing.

== Heritage listing ==
The Murrumba Homestead Grounds were listed on the Queensland Heritage Register on 16 February 2009 having satisfied the following criteria.

The place is important in demonstrating the evolution or pattern of Queensland's history.

The grounds of the former Murrumba Homestead, established in the 1860s, are important for their association with an unusual aspect of early pastoral settlement in Queensland. The taking up of Murrumba for grazing purposes in 1859, during a period of frontier conflict between the indigenous owners of the Pine Rivers district and pastoralists, was illustrative of a rare cordial relationship that existed between Tom Petrie, explorer and pastoralist, and the people of the North Pine clan, who suggested this place for the home of a man they had considered a friend since his childhood. This level of co-operation between European and indigenous peoples is unusual in the early history of Queensland, and the early surviving trees on the site are important markers of the results of this co-operation.

The place demonstrates rare, uncommon or endangered aspects of Queensland's cultural heritage.

The former Murrumba Homestead Grounds retain some of the earliest private garden plantings in Queensland. The extent of the early surviving trees is substantial, and uncommon among Queensland homestead grounds of the nineteenth century. The early plantings include a weeping fig (Ficus benjamina), Hoop pines (Araucaria cunninghamii), bunya pines (Araucaria bidwillii) and kauri pines (Agathis robusta).

The place has a special association with the life or work of a particular person, group or organisation of importance in Queensland's history.

The Murrumba Homestead Grounds are important for their special association with early Queensland settler Tom Petrie, who was a member of the first free family to settle in Queensland; a friend to the Turrbal people and an important historical source of information about them; and a pioneer of the north coast district, marking roads that linked Pine Rivers to Brisbane, Gympie, Redcliffe and the North Coast. Tom Petrie, who made his living largely through timber extraction, maintained a strong interest in indigenous trees throughout his lifetime, and planted numerous Hoop (Araucaria cunninghamii), Bunya (Araucaria bidwillii) and Kauri (Agathis robusta) pines at Murrumba. Throughout the period of occupancy by the Petrie family the gardens at Murrumba Homestead were well-known throughout Southeast Queensland for their plants and bird-life, attracting many visitors (including Sir William Macgregor, Governor of Queensland from December 1909 to July 1914).
