= Fluvidona dorrigoensis =

Conservation status
- Data Deficient (IUCN 3.1)

Scientific classification
- Kingdom: Animalia
- Phylum: Mollusca
- Class: Gastropoda
- Subclass: Caenogastropoda
- Order: Littorinimorpha
- Family: Tateidae
- Genus: Fluvidona
- Species: F. dorrigoensis

Binomial name
- Fluvidona dorrigoensis Miller, Ponder & Clark, 1999

Species of gastropod

Fluvidona dorrigoensis is a species of small freshwater snail with an operculum, an aquatic gastropod mollusc or micromollusc in the family Tateidae.

== Distribution ==
This species is endemic to Australia. It is currently known from specimens collected from Moonmerri Creek near Dorrigo, northern New South Wales.
