= Fluvidona griffithsi =

Scientific classification
- Kingdom: Animalia
- Phylum: Mollusca
- Class: Gastropoda
- Subclass: Caenogastropoda
- Order: Littorinimorpha
- Family: Tateidae
- Genus: Fluvidona
- Species: F. griffithsi

Binomial name
- Fluvidona griffithsi Miller, Ponder & Clark, 1999

Species of gastropod

Fluvidona griffithsi is a species of small freshwater snail with an operculum, an aquatic gastropod mollusc or micromollusc in the family Tateidae. This species is endemic to southern Queensland, Australia.

== Etymology ==
Fluvidona griffithsi is named after Owen Lee Griffiths, who found the first specimens of this species.

== Description ==
This species is, with the possible exception of a single specimen found north of Kyogle, as of yet unidentified and most probably belonging to a distinct species, unique amongst known Australian hydrobiids in being able to aestivate and withstand drying. The type series were found in dry soil in a small, dry creek bed on the landward side of a small hill, in a small coastal rainforest remnant in Burleigh Head National Park, Queensland. Several days after collection they were placed in water, after which they soon emerged and crawled about actively.
