= Fluvidona orphana =

Scientific classification
- Kingdom: Animalia
- Phylum: Mollusca
- Class: Gastropoda
- Subclass: Caenogastropoda
- Order: Littorinimorpha
- Family: Tateidae
- Genus: Fluvidona
- Species: F. orphana

Binomial name
- Fluvidona orphana Miller, Ponder & Clark, 1999

Species of gastropod

Fluvidona orphana is a species of small freshwater snail with an operculum, an aquatic gastropod mollusc or micromollusc in the family Tateidae.

== Etymology ==
The specific epithet orphana is derived from the Greek word orphanos, meaning orphan, and refers to the probable extinction of any related species in the surrounding areas because of land clearing for urban development.

== Distribution and habitat ==
This species is endemic to northern New South Wales, Australia. It is known only from Sea Acres Reserve, Port Macquarie, where it lives in a small stream in a patch of remnant coastal rainforest. It differs from all other Fluvidona species in its habit, being found crawling on palm fronds, etc., in the creek and is also relatively abundant.
