= North Pine River =

River in Queensland, Australia

North Pine
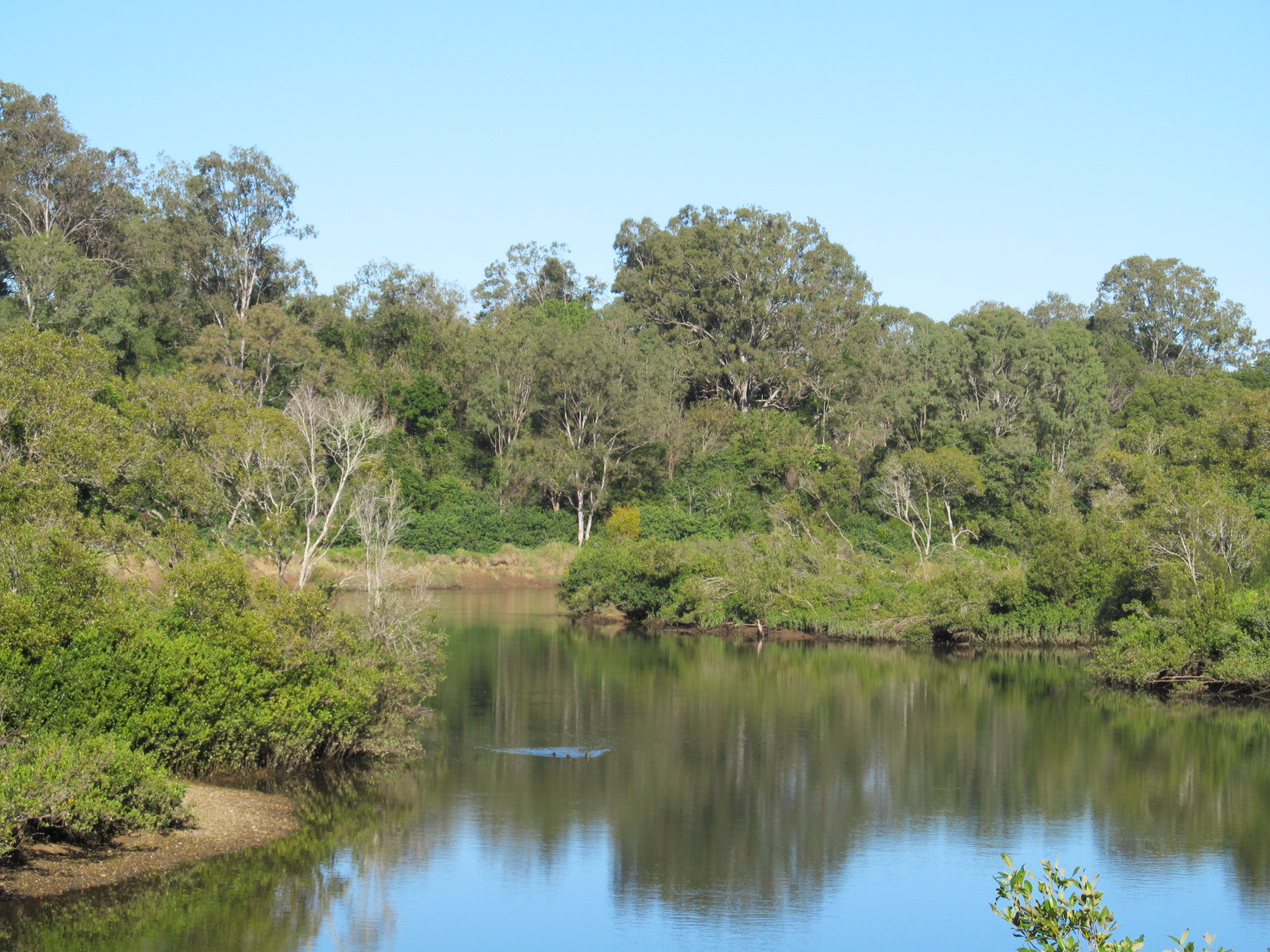
- The river at Petrie, 2016

- Location of the North Pine River mouth in Queensland

Location
- Country: Australia
- State: Queensland
- Region: South East Queensland

Physical characteristics
- Source: D'Aguilar Range
  - location: below Bootawa
  - coordinates: 27°06′47″S 152°44′07″E
  - elevation: 480 m (1,570 ft)
- Mouth: confluence with the South Pine River to form the Pine River
  - location: Lawnton
  - coordinates: 27°17′16″S 153°00′57″E
  - elevation: 10 m (33 ft)
- Length: 54 km (34 mi)

Basin features
- River system: Pine River catchment
- Tributaries
  - left: Yogi Creek
  - right: Laceys Creek, Kobble Creek
- Reservoir: Lake Samsonvale

The North Pine River is a river in South East Queensland, Australia.

== Location and features ==
View from Sweeney's Reserve, 2016

The North Pine River rises in the D'Aguilar Range in the Mount Mee State Forest, approximately 50 km (31 mi) northwest of Brisbane, and flows generally southeast to form its confluence with the South Pine River at Lawnton, where the river forms the Pine River. The river flows mostly through the City of Moreton Bay, just to the south of Dayboro. Along with Kobble Creek it is dammed at Whiteside to form the North Pine Dam, an artificial lake called Lake Samsonvale. This catchment provides drinking water to Redcliffe, Pine Rivers, Caboolture and the northern suburbs of Brisbane.

After the North Pine Dam, the North Pine River continues through the suburbs of Petrie and Lawnton, where it meets with the South Pine River and forms the Pine River, flowing into Bramble Bay. The river descends 470 metres (1,540 ft) over its 54-kilometre (34 mi) course.

The former Pine Rivers Shire draws its name from the North Pine, South Pine and Pine Rivers.

== History ==
In the early 1930s timber for the construction of the Hornibrook Bridge was brought down the North Pine River to Bramble Bay via barge.

Lake Kurwongbah was built in 1964 on Sideling Creek, a tributary of the North Pine River (27.24861°S 152.9575°E).

In January 2011, a significant flood occurred due to heavy rain and dam releases from North Pine Dam. Some areas of Petrie, Strathpine, Lawnton and surrounding areas had to be evacuated on short notice as the river level rose quickly, causing flooding in low lying areas.

== Flora and fauna ==
The North Pine River is one of the few rivers that contain natural populations of the rare Queensland lungfish. Platypus sightings in both the North and South Pine rivers are relatively common compared to other rivers in the region.

Cat's claw creeper (Dolichandra unguis-cati) is an invasive weed vine that has done much damage to trees along the North Pine River catchment. In Queensland, cat's claw is a Category 3 declared weed, which means its release into the environment is not allowed without a special permit.

== See also ==
- List of rivers of Australia § Queensland
