= Tropical garden =

Type of garden

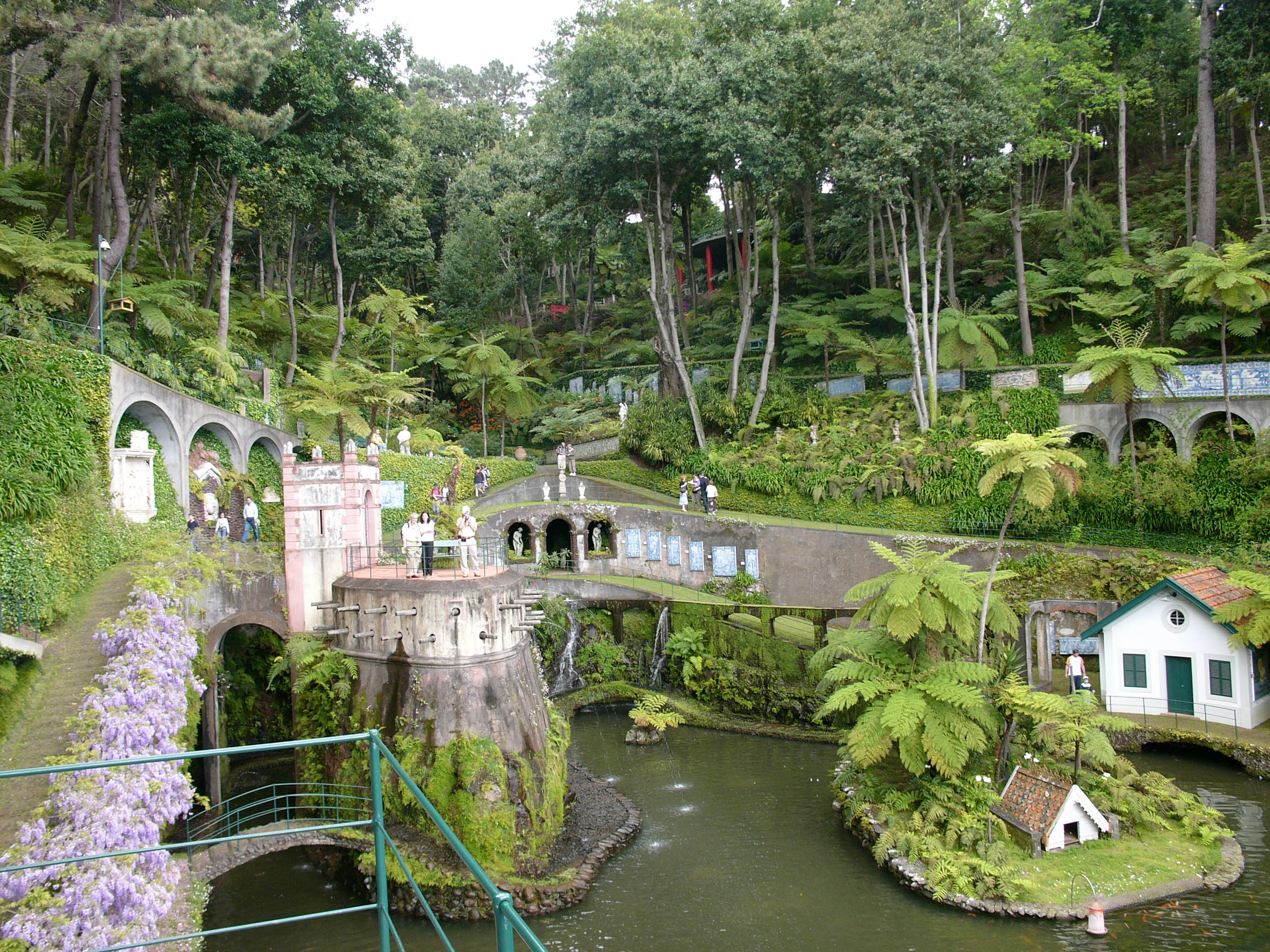
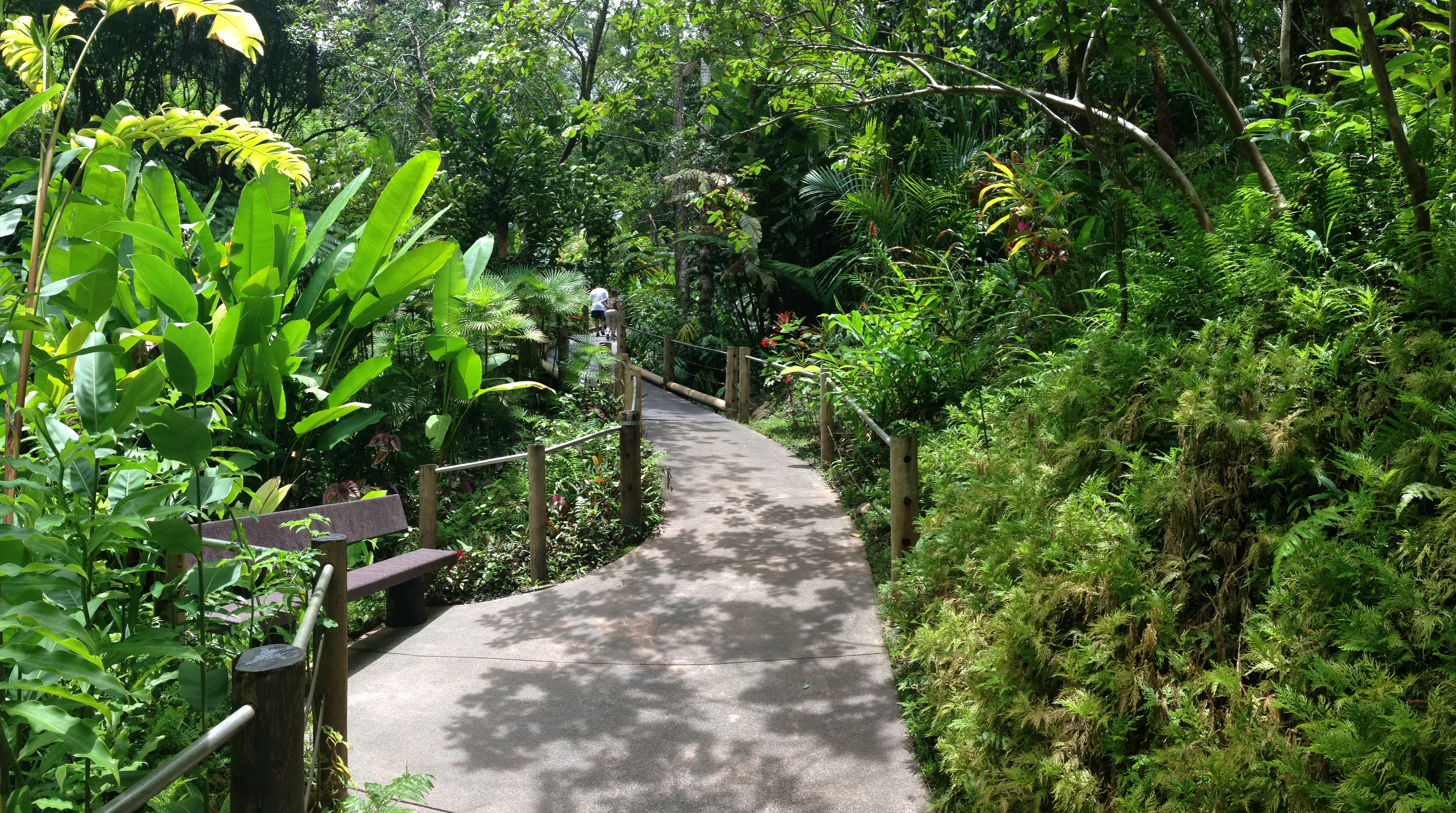
(Top) A tropical garden on the Portuguese island of Madeira and (bottom) the Hawaii Tropical Botanical Garden.

A tropical garden is a type of garden that features tropical plants and requires heavy rainfall or a decent irrigation or sprinkler system for watering. These gardens typically need fertilizer and heavy mulching.

Tropical gardens are no longer exclusive to tropical areas. Many gardeners in cooler climates are adopting the tropical garden design, which is possible through the selection of hardier tropical plants which can survive subtropical or even temperate climates, or through the use of a greenhouse. Main features include plants with very large leaves, vegetation that builds in height towards the back of the garden, creating a dense garden. Large plants and small trees hang over the garden, leaving sunlight to hit the ground directly.

== Tropical plants ==
The following are some examples of tropical plants to be used in tropical gardens or as indoor plants.

=== Hoyas ===
Hoyas are known as the “Wax Flowers” due to their texture and almost unreal appearance. They need relatively warm and humid conditions, but depending on the specific variety of Hoya, they can endure heavy rainfall for some months during the wet seasons just as they may also be exposed to long dry periods. They are commonly used indoors. They need indirect light, but the amount or required light depends on the variety. They need small amounts of water and the soil is to be kept slightly dry since a very wet soil can end up killing this kind of plant. They can be grown in pots that are not too big or in hanging baskets. They grow better if kept at a minimum temperature of 15 degree Celsius (59 Fahrenheit).

=== Banana plants ===
Contrary to common belief, growing banana trees is not that difficult and allow people to enjoy their own bananas. Also these plants can be used as windbreaks. They need fertile soils, large mulch and organic matter, large amounts of nitrogen and potassium, warm temperature, high humidity, large amounts of water, and shelter from other banana plants. Banana plants are not to be exposed to strong winds and extreme weather conditions (too hot or too cold weather) with an ideal temperature being 26-30 degree Celsius (78-86 Fahrenheit). They stop growing below 14 degree Celsius (57 Fahrenheit). Banana rhizomes are planted upright and their roots have to be well covered with soil.

=== Bird of paradise ===
Among the many species commonly called birds of paradise is Strelitzia reginae, a plant that is indigenous to South Africa and South America. As a tropical plant, it grows in warm, humid climates. This exotic, colorful plant with evergreen leaves resembles a bird's beak. It is an outdoor plant, provided the weather is not too cold. Otherwise, it is better to keep it in a pot indoors. It needs rich soil as well as full sun or partial shade. Another requirement for this plant is good drainage.

=== Ferns ===
Ferns are commonly used to give gardens a great foliage. Most ferns are easy to take care of. They basically cannot be exposed to direct sunlight for long periods of time. Moreover, their soil should always be moist. One way to keep ferns moist is by misting them.

=== Papaya tree ===
Papaya trees should be planted where they can be kept warm and free from wind and freeze. They need enough water to support their leaves, but it should not be excessive, which can lead to root rot. They also need a well-drained soil.

=== Orchids ===
Night temperatures between 12 and 18 degrees Celsius (55-65 Fahrenheit), and day temperatures between 23 and 26 degree Celsius (75-80 Fahrenheit) are fine temperatures for orchids. Orchids need sufficient amounts of light as well as humidity. However, there are many varieties of orchids and each of them features specific care needs.

== Maintenance ==
A tropical garden is one of the most difficult types of garden to build and maintain; it becomes more difficult the more the local climate differs from the plants' natural habitat. The keys to a healthy tropical garden are plentiful light and water. The large leaves that feature in tropical plants require the soil to be humid at all times, so irrigation is essential for some gardens. Over-watering causes the roots to rot, killing plants.

A tropical plant that is not cold-hardy should be brought indoors during the winter and returned to the garden for the summer.

== Non-tropical climates ==
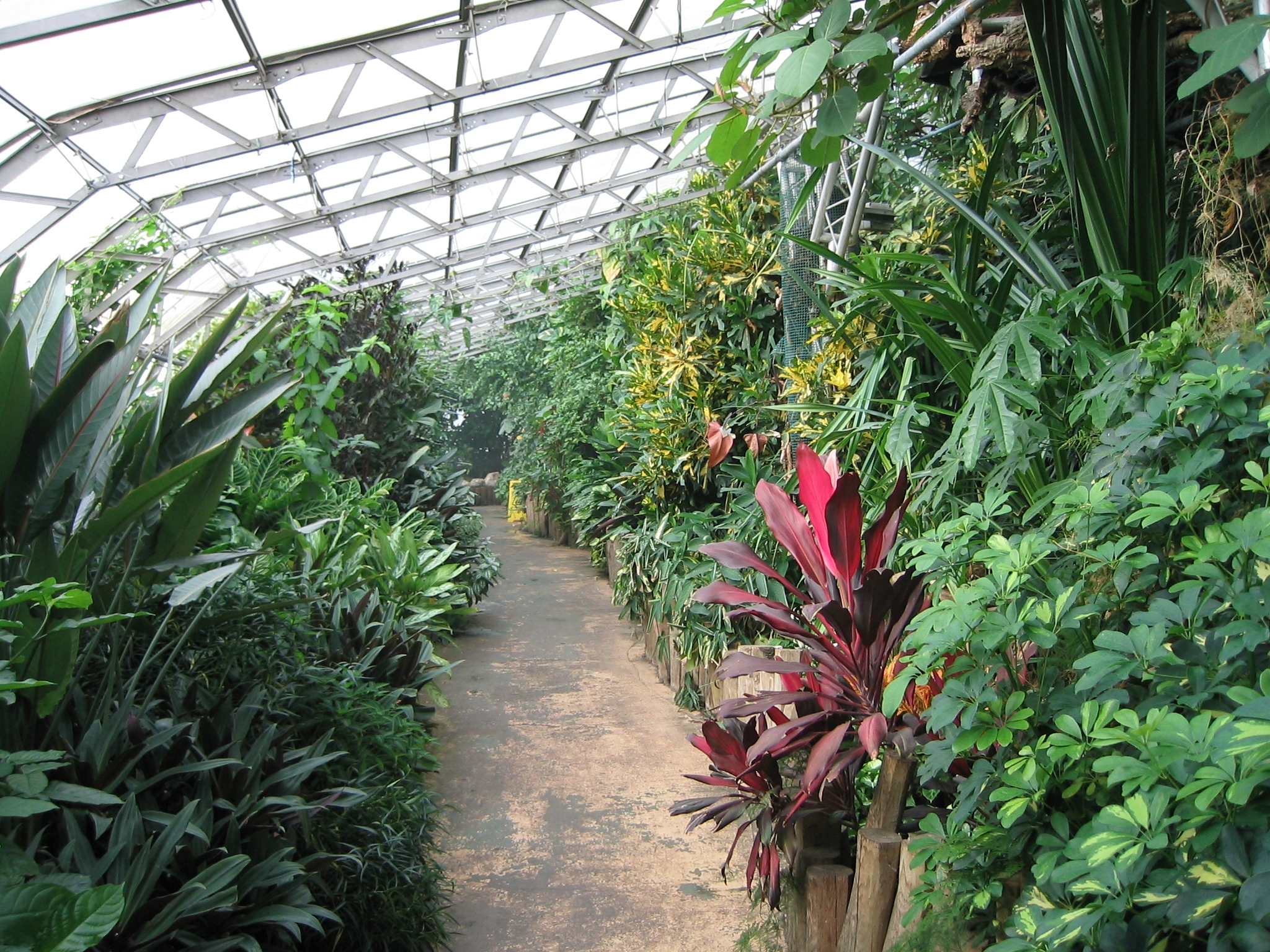
A greenhouse is a good way to grow tropical plants in a colder climate.

Tropical and tropical-style plants that work well in milder non-tropical climates include:

- Abutilon megapotamicum
- Acanthus mollis
- Aechmea recurvata
- Agapanthus
- Albizia julibrissin
- × Amarcrinum
- Amorphophallus bulbifer
- Aspidistra elatior
- Asplenium scolopendrium
- Aucuba
- Araucaria araucana
- Begonia grandis
- Begonia sikkimensis
- Berberis eurybracteata
- Billbergia nutans
- Bletilla
- Butia
- Canna
- Calanthe
- Campsis
- Cardiocrinum
- Catalpa
- Cautleya
- Choisya ternata
- Colocasia
- Cordyline australis
- Corynabutilon
- Crocosmia
- Crinodendron hookerianum
- Cypripedium
- Cyrtomium falcatum
- Dicksonia antarctica
- Embothrium coccineum
- Eriobotrya japonica
- Eucalyptus gunnii
- Eucomis
- Euphorbia mellifera
- Farfugium japonicum
- Fargesia
- Fascicularia
- × Fatshedera
- Fatsia
- Ficus carica
- Fuchsia magellanica
- Gardenia jasminoides
- Griselinia littoralis
- Gunnera manicata
- Haberlea
- Hedera algeriensis
- Hedychium
- Heptapleurum taiwanianum
- Hibiscus coccineus
- Hibiscus moscheutos
- Incarvillea delavayi
- Jasminum officinale
- Jubaea
- Kalopanax
- Kniphofia
- Lobelia tupa
- Magnolia grandiflora
- Manihot grahamii
- Matteuccia
- Musa basjoo
- Musa sikkimensis
- Musella
- Nelumbo nucifera
- Paris polyphylla
- Passiflora caerulea
- Passiflora incarnata
- Paulownia
- Phormium
- Phyllostachys
- Pittosporum tobira
- Pleioblastus fortunei
- Pleione formosana
- Podocarpus salignus
- Polystichum acrostichoides
- Pseudopanax
- Rhapidophyllum
- Rheum palmatum
- Rhododendron sinogrande
- Ricinus
- Roscoea
- Sabal minor
- Salvia guaranitica
- Sauromatum venosum
- Saxifraga stolonifera
- Struthiopteris spicant
- Tasmannia lanceolata
- Tetrapanax
- Tigridia pavonia
- Titanotrichum
- Trachelospermum jasminoides
- Trachycarpus
- Wollemia
- Yucca
- Zantedeschia
- Zingiber mioga

== Gallery ==
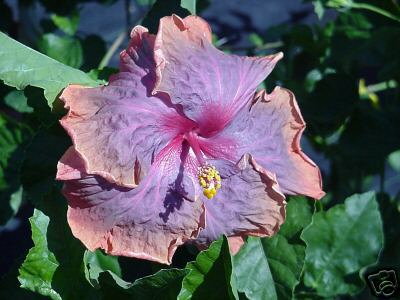
Gator Pride Hibiscus

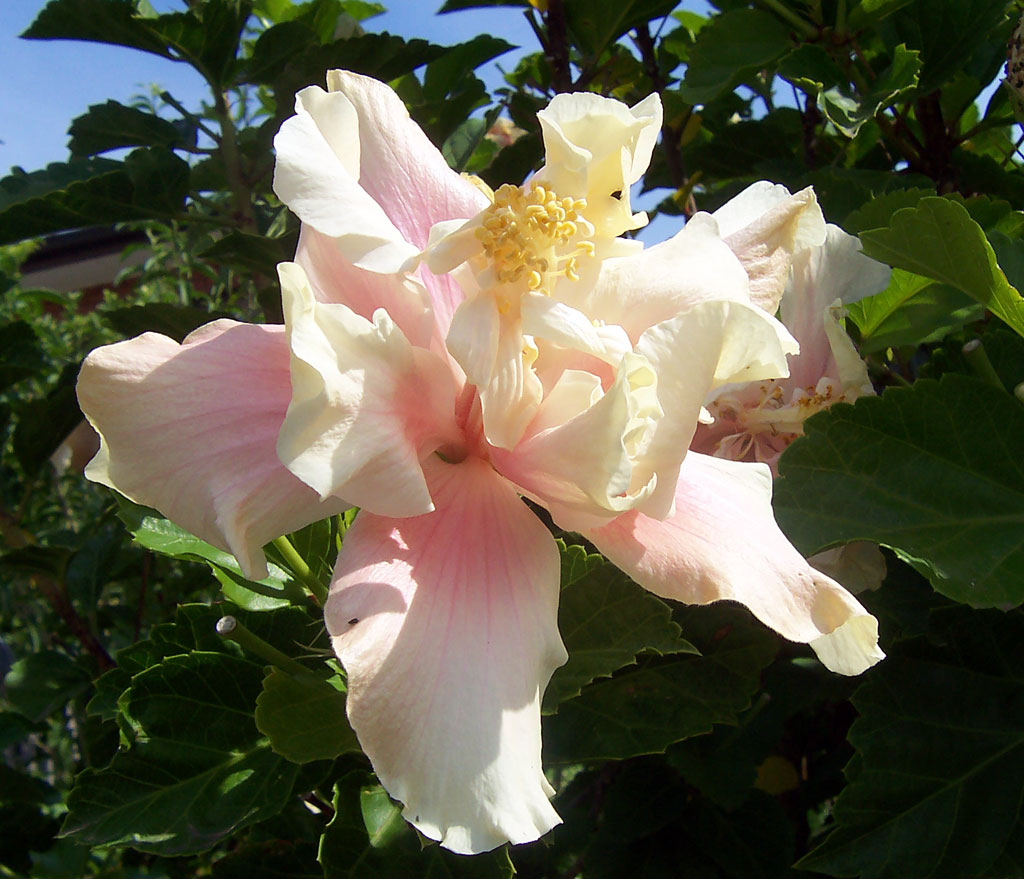
Double Hibiscus

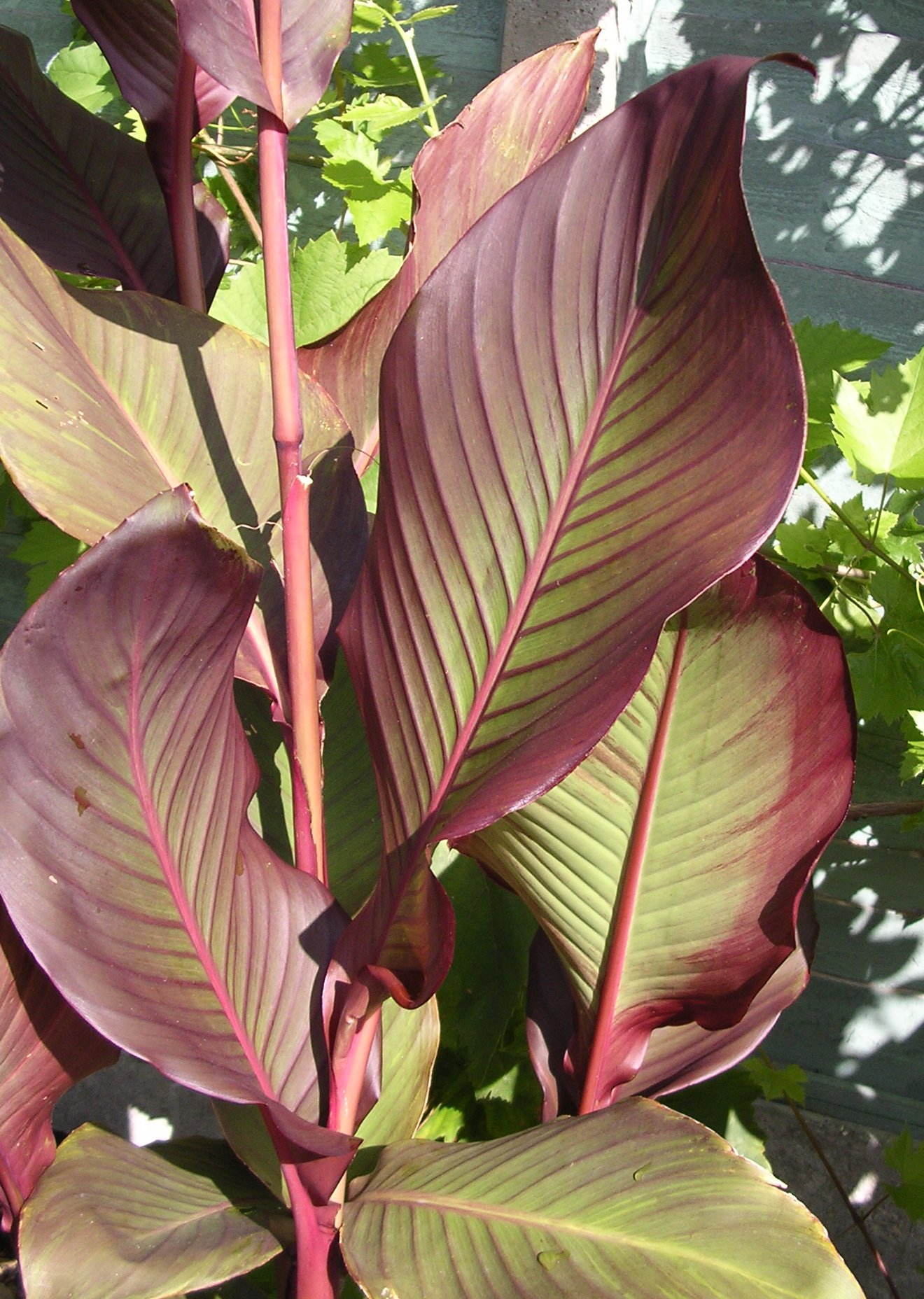
Canna 'Auguste Ferrier'

== Attractions ==
Many attractions feature tropical gardens, including:

- Alma Park Zoo, Kuranda, Queensland, Australia
- Kuranda Scenic Railway, Dakabin, Queensland
- Colasanti's Tropical Gardens, Kingsville, Ontario, Canada
- Flor og Fjære, Stavanger, Norway
- Cedarvale Botanic Garden and Restaurant, Davis, Oklahoma, USA
- Reiman Gardens, Ames, Iowa

== See also ==
- List of garden types
