= Noosa Adventist College =

Location
- 20 Cooroy Belli Creek Road, Cooroy, Queensland; Australia; 26°25′36.8″S 152°54′12.07″E

Information
- Former name: Noosa Christian College (NCC)
- School type: Independent School/Private School
- Motto: Nothing Without God
- Religious affiliation: Australian Union Conference of Seventh-day Adventists
- Denomination: Seventh-day Adventist
- Established: 2003
- Sister school: Northpine College
- Principal: Jeanette Martin
- Chaplain: Pr Jacob Ugljesa
- Grades: Kindergarten, Prep, Years 1-12
- Enrolment: 280
- Houses: Sports Houses: Bradman, Frazer, Newcomb, Freeman
- Colours: Maroon and navy blue
- Slogan: Nothing Without God
- Website: https://nac.qld.edu.au/

Noosa Adventist College (NAC), formally Noosa Christian College, is a co-educational primary and secondary private school in Cooroy, Queensland, Australia.

It is owned and operated by the Seventh-day Adventist Church; its sister college, Northpine Christian College, is located in Dakabin.

It is a part of the Seventh-day Adventist education system, the world's second largest Christian school system.

== History ==
Principal Ross Reid established the school in 2003. It has grown into a Kindergarten to Year 12 school with a one-to-one laptop program for the Secondary College (Years 7 to 12). In 2011, the school celebrated its first graduation of a year 12 class.

In 2011, the John Hogg, Senator for Queensland and President of the Australian Senate, officially opened a new A$2 million library funded entirely by the Australian Government Building Education Revolution (BER) scheme. Noosa Christian College is one of 55 Adventist schools in Australia. These Adventist schools have received A$100 million as part of the Australian government's education modernisation program.

== See also ==
- Seventh-day Adventist education
- List of schools in Queensland
- List of Seventh-day Adventist secondary schools
