= Dakabin railway station =

Railway station in Queensland, Australia

Dakabin
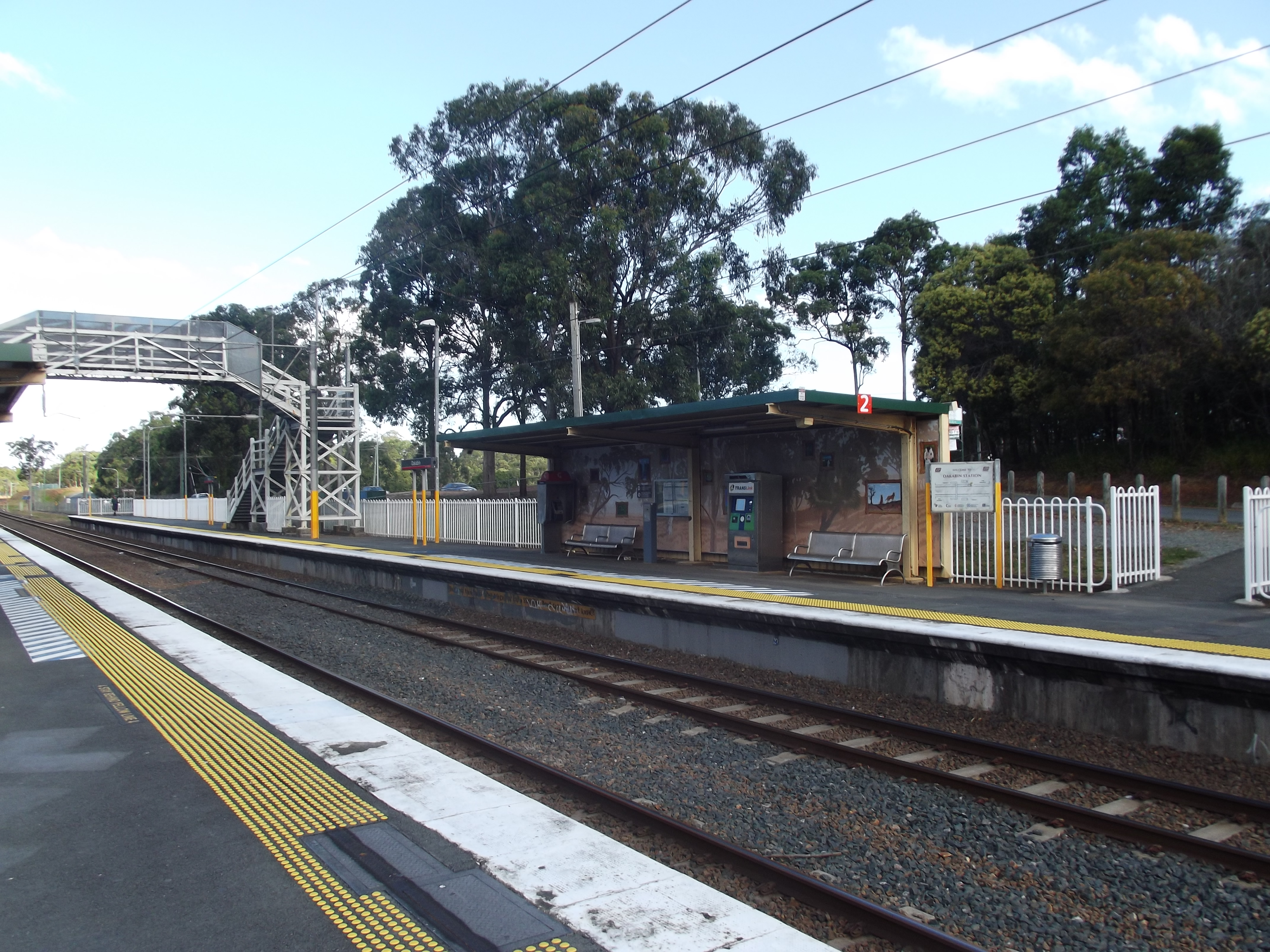
- Southbound view from Platform 1 in June 2012

General information
- Location: Narangba Road, Kurwongbah
- Coordinates: 27°13′45.18″S 152°58′31.31″E
- Owner: Queensland Rail
- Operator: Queensland Rail
- Lines: T1 Caboolture; T1 Nambour/Gympie North
- Distance: 32.10 kilometres from Central
- Platforms: 2 side
- Tracks: 2

Construction
- Structure type: Ground
- Parking: 350 bays
- Cycle facilities: Yes
- Accessible: Yes

Other information
- Status: Staffed part-time
- Station code: 600467 (platform 1); 600468 (platform 2)
- Fare zone: Zone 3
- Website: Queensland Rail

History
- Opened: 1888; 138 years ago

Services
Preceding station	Queensland Rail	Following station
Petrie towards Ipswich or Rosewood via Roma Street	T1 Caboolture line	Narangba towards Caboolture
Petrie towards Ipswich or Rosewood via Roma Street	T1 Nambour/Gympie North line	Narangba towards Nambour
Location

Dakabin is a railway station operated by Queensland Rail on the Caboolture and Nambour/Gympie North lines. It opened in 1888 and serves the Moreton Bay suburbs of Dakabin and Kurwongbah. It is a ground level station, featuring two side platforms.

== Services ==
Dakabin station is served by all Citytrain network services from Nambour and Caboolture to Central, many continuing to Springfield Central, Ipswich and Rosewood.

== Platforms and services ==
Dakabin platform arrangement
Platform	Lines	Destinations	Notes
1	T1 Caboolture	Roma Street (to Ipswich/Rosewood line)	
1	T1 Nambour/Gympie North	Roma Street (to Ipswich/Rosewood line)	
2	T1 Caboolture	Caboolture	
2	T1 Nambour/Gympie North	Nambour	
