= Caboolture line =

Passenger rail service in Queensland, Australia

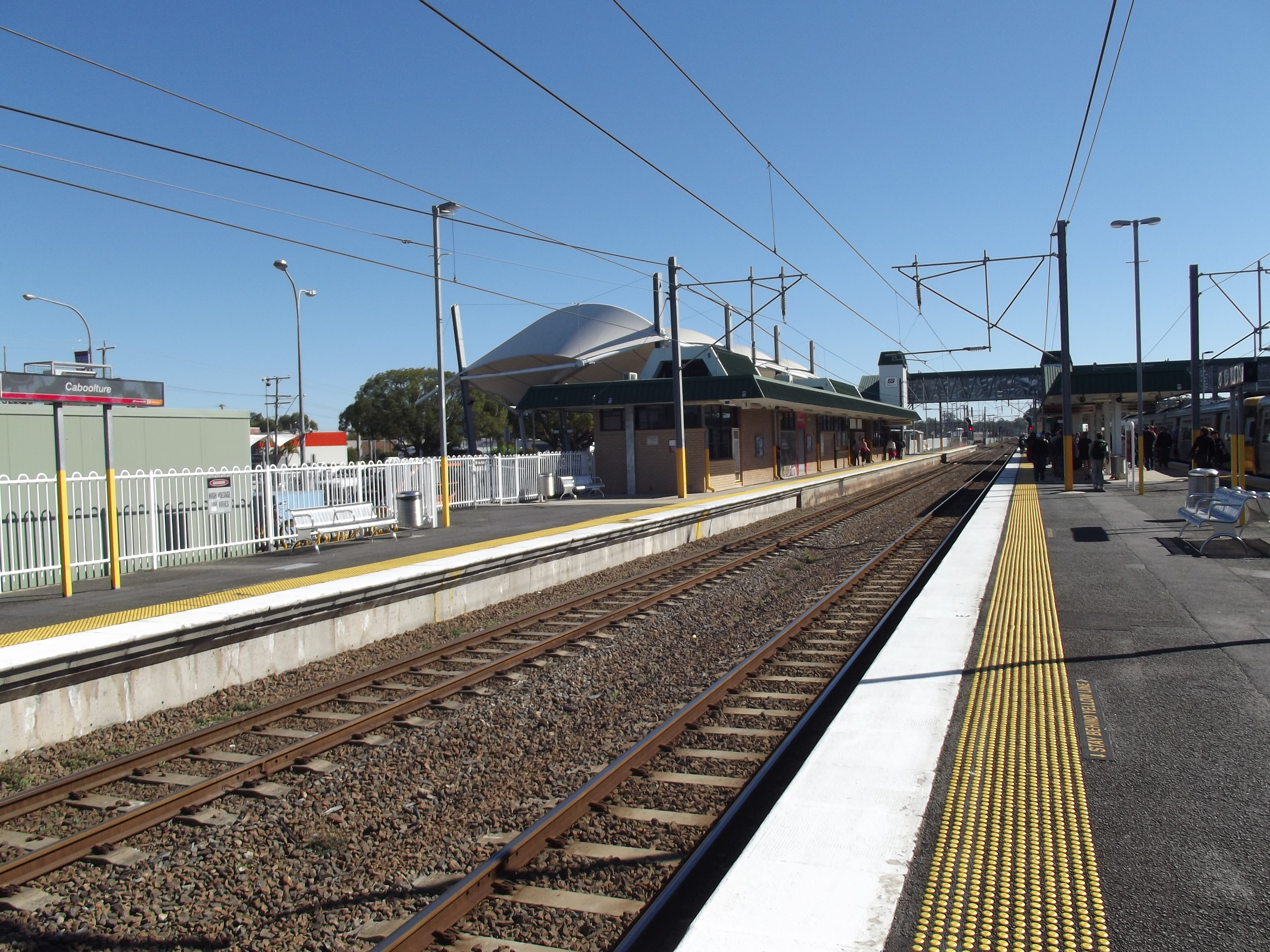
- Caboolture railway station in August 2012

Overview
- Status: Operational
- Owner: Queensland Rail
- Locale: Caboolture
- Termini: Roma Street; Caboolture
- Stations: 13
- Website: queenslandrail.com.au

Service
- Type: Commuter rail
- System: Queensland Rail City network
- Operator: Queensland Rail

History
- Opened: 11 June 1888

Technical
- Line length: 49.570 km (30.801 mi)
- Number of tracks: Quadruple to Northgate, triple to Petrie, remainder double track.
- Track gauge: 1,067 mm (3 ft 6 in)
- Electrification: 1982–1986
- Operating speed: 100 km/h (62 mph)

The T1 Caboolture line is a suburban commuter railway line in Brisbane, Queensland. Operated by Queensland Rail, the line runs for 50.4 kilometres (31 miles) from Caboolture to Roma Street, where services continue on the Ipswich/Rosewood line.

== History ==
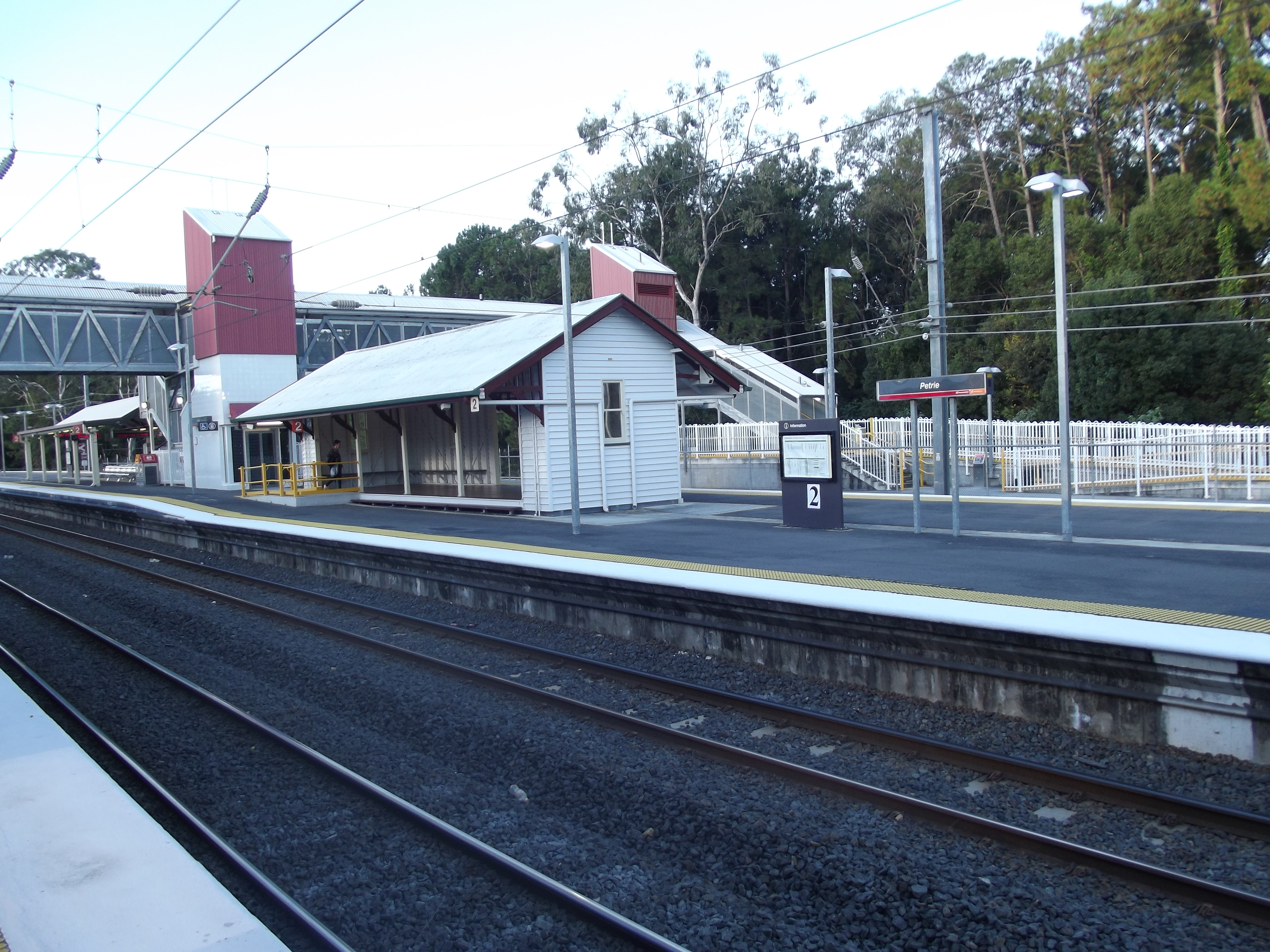
Petrie railway station, 2012

The first section of the line, to Northgate (and to Shorncliffe via the Shorncliffe line) opened in 1882. In 1883 the Queensland Government decided to link Gladstone to Brisbane by railway, and eventually decided upon Northgate as the junction for the new line.

The alignment from Roma Street to Bowen Hills was via Normanby (today known as the Exhibition line), and this remained the case until the dual track line via Central opened in 1890.

The Queensland Government called tenders for construction of the new Caboolture line in 1886, with the contractor undertaking works "energetically", and despite delays due to the late arrival of bridge beams, the line was unofficially opened on 11 June 1888, with the official opening on 16 June 1888. The next section of the North Coast line to Landsborough opened in 1890.

The section from Bowen Hills to Eagle Junction was duplicated in 1886, with the section to Northgate duplicated in 1890, and on to Caboolture by 1917.

The section from Roma Street to Bowen Hills was electrified in 1979, to Northgate in 1982, to Petrie in 1983 and to Caboolture in 1986.

The growth in patronage as a result of electrification resulted in the quadruplication of the Roma Street–Northgate section in 1996, including two pairs of single-track tunnels and the realisation of the use of the Bowen Hills tunnel widened 20 years earlier. Some of the roadbed and bridge abutments had been built in the 1950s before the original quadruplication scheme was abandoned. A third line has been added as far as Lawnton, which has been extended to Petrie as part of the Redcliffe Peninsula line, which opened on 4 October 2016. Following the opening of the Redcliffe Peninsula line, a decision was made that all services on the Caboolture line would run express between Petrie and Bowen Hills, stopping only at Northgate and Eagle Junction. Stations between Petrie and Northgate would be serviced by the new Redcliffe Peninsula services while stations between Northgate and Bowen Hills would continue to be serviced by other existing services.

On 10 August 2026, the Caboolture line was numbered T1 (along with the Ipswich/Rosewood and Nambour/Gympie North lines) by Translink.

== Network and operations ==
All trains run express between Petrie and Bowen Hills, stopping only at Northgate and Eagle Junction. The typical travel time between Caboolture and Brisbane City is approximately 51 minutes (to Central). A few services that originate or continue to Gympie North on the Nambour/Gympie North line skip stations between Caboolture and Bowen Hills stopping only at Petrie and Northgate.

During the off-peak, services generally continue to Ipswich railway station on the Ipswich and Rosewood line.

Passengers for/from the T1 change at Petrie or Northgate, T2 at Petrie, T4 at Northgate, T5 and T3 at Eagle Junction, T5 line change at Bowen Hills, and all other lines at Central.

=== Stations ===
List of T1 Caboolture line stations
T1 Caboolture line
Station	Image	Suburb	Opened	Grade	Connections	Time
	Continues from T1 Ipswich/Rosewood line					
Roma Street		Brisbane CBD	14 June 1875	Ground	Springfield line Doomben Cleveland line Gold Coast line Beenleigh line Brisbane Metro Bus transport in Queensland	0
Central		Brisbane CBD	18 August 1889	Built over	Redcliffe Peninsula line Doomben Shorncliffe line Airport line, Brisbane Ferny Grove line	2 (Note: Service dwells for two minutes.)
Fortitude Valley		Fortitude Valley	1 November 1890	Underground	Redcliffe Peninsula line Doomben Shorncliffe line Airport line, Brisbane Ferny Grove line	6
Bowen Hills		Bowen Hills	1973	Ground level	Redcliffe Peninsula line Doomben Shorncliffe line Airport line, Brisbane Ferny Grove line	8
Eagle Junction		Clayfield	1882	Ground level	Redcliffe Peninsula line Doomben Shorncliffe line Airport line, Brisbane	13
Northgate		Northgate	1882	Ground level	Redcliffe Peninsula line Shorncliffe line	17
Petrie		Petrie	1888	Ground level	Redcliffe Peninsula line	33
Dakabin		Kurwongbah	1888	Ground level	none	37
Narangba		Narangba	1888	Ground level	none	40
Burpengary		Burpengary	June 1888	Ground level	none	45
Morayfield		Morayfield	1888	Ground level	none	49
Caboolture		Caboolture	June 1889	Ground level	none	53
Continues to T1 Nambour/Gympie North line

== See also ==
- Queensland Rail
- Translink
