= North Pine Pumping Station =

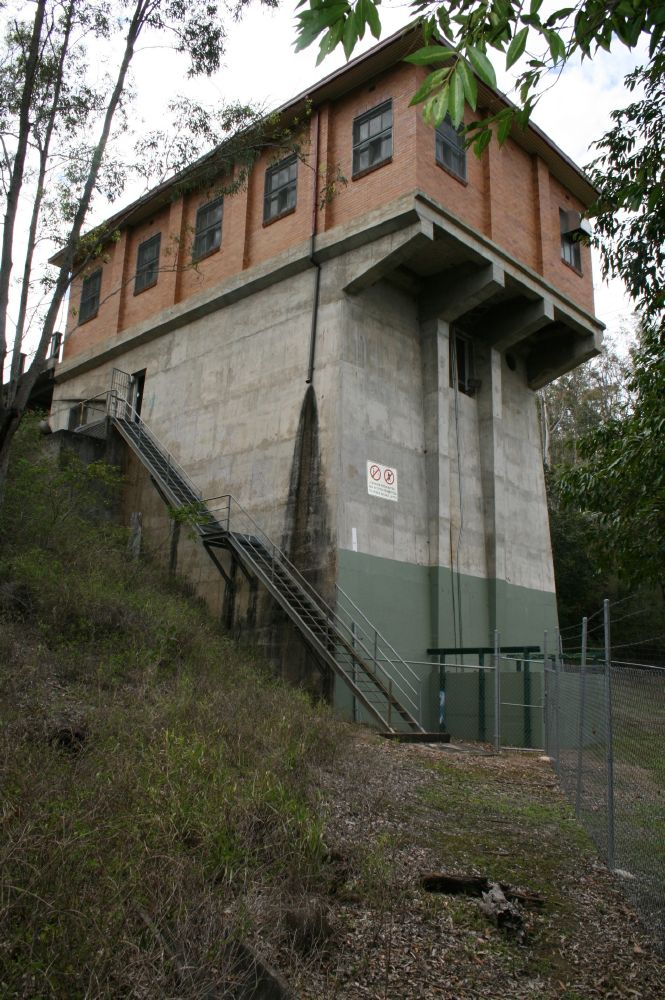
- North Pine Pumping Station, 2007

- Location within Queensland Location within Australia
- 27.2582°S 152.9506°E
- Location: Lake Kurwongbah-Dayboro Road, Whiteside, City of Moreton Bay, Queensland, Australia

History
- Design period: 1940s - 1960s (post-World War II)
- Built: 1956-1961

Queensland Heritage Register
- Official name: North Pine Pumping Station, Dayboro Road Pumping Station
- Type: state heritage (built)
- Designated: 28 January 2009
- Reference no.: 602691
- Significant period: 1950s-1960s
- Significant components: watercourse - river, crane / gantry, dam/reservoir, machinery/plant/equipment - utilities - water supply, pump
- Builders: K D Morris & Sons Pty Ltd

North Pine Pumping Station is a heritage-listed pumping station at Lake Kurwongbah-Dayboro Road, Whiteside, City of Moreton Bay, Queensland, Australia. It was built from 1956 to 1961 by K D Morris & Sons Pty Ltd. It is also known as Dayboro Road Pumping Station. It was added to the Queensland Heritage Register on 28 January 2009.

== History ==
The North Pine Pumping Station is located on Dayboro Road opposite Lake Kurwongbah dam near Petrie. It is an important component of the North Pine Water Supply scheme constructed in the late 1950s to supply water to the former Pine Rivers Shire, Redcliffe and the Amcor carton board mill at Petrie.

A scheme to supply water to the (then) townships of Strathpine, Lawnton, Petrie and Kallangur was first proposed in 1946. Water was to be obtained from Brisbane City Council via the South Pine River Bridge. However, before this proposal could be acted upon, Pine Shire Council (later Pine Rivers Shire Council) was approached by Australian Paper Manufacturers (APM) (now Amcor) and the Coordinator General's Department who advised them of the future water needs of APM's planned carton board mill at Petrie. The cardboard making process requires large quantities of water and so an adequate water supply was a vital part of the required infrastructure for the mill.

Soon after the initial approach, APM presented the council with a proposal for a scheme supplying water from the North Pine River. In 1949, council undertook to proceed with this scheme and to act as the constructing authority. Acting on advice from the Local Government Department, council modified the scheme so that water could also be drawn from a dam on Sideling Creek if needed. In January 1953, the Queensland Government approved the scheme. By 1954, the planned scheme was expanded to also supply water to Redcliffe Town Council.

The APM mill at Petrie was the largest industrial undertaking in southern Queensland during the immediate post-war period and probably the largest individual industrial unit to be constructed by the private sector in Queensland to that date. It made an important contribution to the post-war development of Queensland's secondary industries. Prior to World War II, Queensland lacked secondary industries of any note and from the 1950s the Queensland government encouraged their growth. The State assisted APM to establish the mill and assisted with financing the water supply scheme by granting a 50% subsidy and helping with raising loans. In 2004, the Petrie Mill was the only coated carton board manufacturing plant in Australia, producing about thirty different carton board products and with production exceeding 140,000 metric tons (140,000 long tons; 150,000 short tons) per annum.

The agreement that ultimately formed the foundation of the project was signed by Pine Shire Council, Redcliffe Town Council and APM at a ceremony attended by the Queensland Premier on 29 June 1955. Under its terms, Pine Shire Council was to supply APM and Redcliffe Town Council with specified quantities of water at cost price for a period of 60 years.

Under the agreement, Pine Shire Council was responsible for constructing the scheme that consisted of three major components: the pumping station, a dam on Sideling Creek and a filtration works. The council's consulting engineers, John Wilson and Partners, designed and managed the project assisted by Scott and Furphy, consulting engineers of Melbourne.

The pumping station was the first major construction of the project. A sod turning ceremony was held at the pump house site on 18 February 1956 to mark the commencement of the project. The Queensland Treasurer, who officiated at the ceremony, noted that the pump house was the nucleus of the scheme.

Construction of the pump house by Brisbane firm KD Morris & Sons Pty Ltd reached completion in mid-1957. The pumps were installed by Alfred Snahall Anthon Pty Ltd. When built, the station housed two 100,000 imperial gallons per hour (450 m^{3}/h) pumps and two 50,000 imperial gallons per hour (230 m^{3}/h) pumps together with ancillary equipment. Water could be drawn from the adjacent North Pine River or from the dam to be constructed nearby on Sideling Creek. Water was conveyed from the dam, later to be known as Lake Kurwongbah, via a tunnel containing a 30-inch (760 mm) main that passed under the Petrie to Dayboro Road. The station could also be configured to top up the dam by pumping water from the North Pine River. The pumping station cost around £86,000.

In its essential elements, the station building follows standard design principles for pump stations of the time. For cost and maintenance reasons, the pumps are located below the river level. This means that although the station presents as a single storey building from the road, the floor of the building, where the pumps are located, is over 20 metres (66 ft) below the entrance. The electrical control mechanisms and offices are above river flood levels on the same floor as the entrance.

The completed water supply scheme was officially opened by the Honourable Henry Winston Noble (State Minister for Health and Home Affairs) in April 1961, though it had first supplied water to the APM mill in 1957. When opened, it was Queensland's third largest water supply scheme outside of Brisbane; the cost of construction was around £1,000,000.

Subsequently to its construction, the pump station has undergone a number of changes. Externally, the roof tiles have been replaced. Inside the station, the pumps have been upgraded from single speed to variable speed units and the operation, originally manual, has been computerised.

The establishment of the mill and the construction of the water supply created a surge of development in the Pine Shire. By 1961, when the scheme was opened, the Pine Shire Mayor noted that houses were being built in the shire at the rate of one every two days and that property sales in the previous year had reached a record figure. The villages of the shire which had existed for decades as tiny rural settlements were beginning their transformation into urbanised outer suburbs of Greater Brisbane.

== Description ==
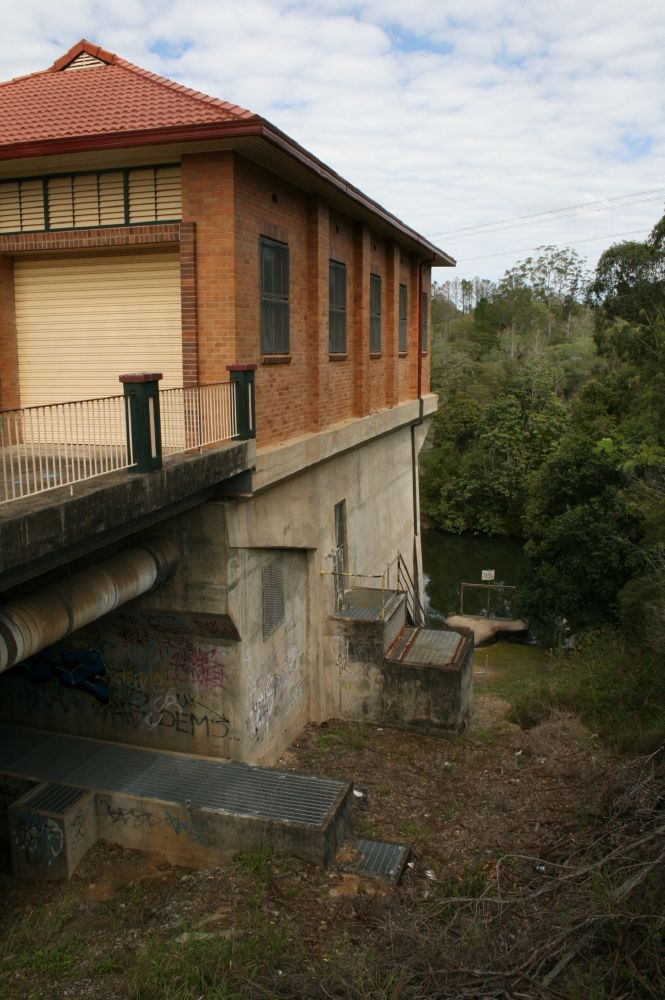
North Pine Pumping Station, 2007

Tucked into a bend in Dayboro Road southwest of Lake Kurwongbah, the North Pine Pumping Station backs onto the North Pine River. From Dayboro Road the pumping station is seen as a discreet single-storey orange facebrick building sheltered by a tiled hip roof. This part of the building houses the control room.

The main components of the pumping operation are the river inlet, basement and chamber, and the control room. The operations are computer controlled allowing the station to function unmanned.

Arranged over two levels, the building is organised around a compact plan meeting its functional program of drawing water from the river and pumping it to the nearby water treatment plant or to Lake Kurwongbah dam. The building rises approximately 20 metres (66 ft) as a concrete shaft from its base on the riverbank to four tapered concrete beams supporting the concrete floor of the control room.

Approached across a concrete driveway from Dayboro Road, the building has two entrances - the main entrance which is defined by recessed brickwork is a timber door shielded by a decorative metal door and the other is a roller door defined by a projecting surround in darker brick. Lettering over the main entrance doorway identifies the building as "Pine Shire Council Pumping Station" and a plaque commemorating the turning of the sod ceremony is fixed between the main and roller door entrances. A bank of narrow louvres sits over the roller door. The long elevations contain five bays defined by plain projecting pilasters with a six-light frosted wire-glass steel framed window to the middle of each bay. The river elevation is divided into three bays by projecting pilasters with the end bays accommodating sets of windows matching those found on the long elevations. The window to the south bay accommodates a metal exhaust vent to the upper half. The sets of six-light windows have a fixed tilted lower middle light.

The entrance level contains a foyer, small office and control room. The foyer accommodates a timber shelf, cupboards and a hand basin and leads into the enclosed office with a built-in timber desk below a glazed window which allows surveillance of the control room. The concrete floor of the control room has six removable metal grates for access to the chamber and basement below. A portable tubular steel frame safety barrier sitting in the room is placed around the hole when a grate is removed. The control room accommodates a number of metal cabinets housing the computerised controls for the pumping plant. A gantry crane travels on rails along the length of the room. The gantry rails are carried by concrete beams supported by concrete columns with corbelled capitals. The interior is plastered and painted. Concrete steps from the control room descend down to the basement winding down along the inner northeast wall.

Evidence of the early manual operation of the station survives. The wheel handle valve controls are now gone but marks on the control room floor indicate the locations of their footings. The steel frame within the chamber accommodates the fixings for the shafts that ran down from the wheel handles to the pipes at the basement level. The original Kemp hydraulic controls machine now stands near the roller door. It once stood on the raised concrete pad at the river side of the control room. Associated with this is the lever control mounted on a small pedestal which stands in the middle of the control room. The lever control opened and shut the valves which when they were too tight had to be manipulated by hand. This hydraulic control mechanism is no longer operational. Dotted lines on the control room floor near the lever pedestal indicate that the river valves are to the southeast and the dam valves to the northwest. Three original pressure gauges are housed in a timber panel below the middle window on the northwest wall. These were connected to the pumps.

Below the control room a three to four storey volume chamber drops to the pumps, pipes, valves, drains, pits and motors housed at the basement level. There are six raw water variable speed pumps (these replaced the original four single speed pumps). The cantilevered concrete stairs winding down along the northeast wall of the chamber rest at a number of open metal grate gangways which run around the inner perimeter. The concrete stairs and metal gangways have tubular metal rails. The metal gangways, steel frame that housed the shafts, various conduits, conduit platforms, rising pipes and plant are contained within the chamber. There are two windows to the middle of the chamber wall on both the river and southwest sides just below the control room.

One flight down from the control room a door to the northwest opens onto external metal stairs which lead down to the river intake facility. The river intake facility is housed below the pumping station beneath a concrete platform at the edge of the river. Metal grille screens run across the inlet. A block and tackle is fitted to the hook on the steel frame at the end of the concrete platform to pull the screens up for cleaning. The intake draws water from the river and through the pumping station by a series of valve controlled pipes power by electric motors housed in the basement level from where it is pumped via two mains to the water treatment plant in Monaro Drive, Petrie or into the Lake Kurwongbah dam. Water is also pumped from the dam to the water treatment plant.

Additional pits, pipes and valves are located beneath the external metal stair and the front concrete driveway.

A small brick toilet block stands to the southeast of the station.

Wunderlich clay tiles in a Marseilles pattern which were removed from the station roof lie in piles behind the toilet.

The pumping station is set within grassed and treed paddocks. A barbed wire fence runs around the property.

== Heritage listing ==
North Pine Pumping Station was listed on the Queensland Heritage Register on 28 January 2009 having satisfied the following criteria.

The place is important in demonstrating the evolution or pattern of Queensland's history.

The North Pine Pump Station (1957) formed an integral part of the infrastructure for Australian Paper Manufacturers' (now Amcor's) Cartonboard Mill at Petrie (1957). This was reported to be the largest industrial undertaking in southern Queensland during the post-war period. Prior to World War II, Queensland had few secondary industries; the pump station is important in demonstrating the post-war expansion of this sector of the State's economy.

The pump station was also part of the North Pine Water Supply Scheme, Pine (now Pine Rivers) Shire's first water reticulation scheme and important infrastructure contributing to the growth of the shire in the 1950s and 1960s. As such, it is important in demonstrating the development of Brisbane's outer suburbs during the post-war period. The establishment of the mill and the water supply scheme in the late 1950s marked the beginning of the transformation of the small rural settlements of Pine Shire into commuter suburbs of the State's capital.

The place is important in demonstrating the principal characteristics of a particular class of cultural places.

A well-conceived utility structure, the North Pine Pumping Station is a small scale industrial building designed to accommodate the operations for water pumping. Although now computerised (no longer manually operated), the station retains much original plant and is important in demonstrating the principal characteristics of this building type. In its essential elements, the station follows the standard design principles for pumping stations. It presents from the road as a single storey building with the bulk of the structure housed below. The intake pumps are located below river level and draw water into the mains for pumping through a series of pipes and valves to the water treatment plant. The basement contains the main plant for the pumping operations including pipes, valves, drains, pits and motors. The control room sits safely above flood level and houses the equipment that operates and monitors the plant. This room is connected to the basement by a chamber.

The place is important because of its aesthetic significance.

In a grassed and treed setting overlooking the North Pine River and Lake Kurwongbah, this robust utility building designed in a discrete classical idiom is a picturesque treatment of a utility structure. From the river the building is a surprise, rising dramatically as a soaring concrete shaft.

The place has a special association with the life or work of a particular person, group or organisation of importance in Queensland's history.

The pump station formed part of important infrastructure for Australian Paper Manufacturers' Mill. As such it has close association with the largest post war undertaking in Southern Queensland and a company that continues to be of national importance.
