= Northpine Christian College =

Northpine Adventist College

Location
- Dakabin, Queensland; Australia; 27°13′14″S 152°59′06″E

Information
- Type: Independent co-educational primary and secondary day school
- Motto: Nothing without God
- Religious affiliation: Australian Union Conference of Seventh-day Adventists
- Denomination: Seventh-day Adventist
- Established: 1978; 48 years ago
- Sister school: Noosa Adventist College
- Principal: Jeanette Martin
- Enrolment: 963 (2019)
- Website: www.northpine.qld.edu.au

Northpine Adventist College is an independent Seventh-day Adventist co-educational primary and secondary day school, located in Dakabin, Brisbane, Queensland, Australia. The college is owned and operated by the Seventh-day Adventist Church, South Queensland District and is part of the Seventh-day Adventist Church's worldwide educational system.

== See also ==
- List of Seventh-day Adventist secondary schools
- List of schools in Queensland
- Seventh-day Adventist education
