= North Pine Presbyterian Church =

North Pine (former) Presbyterian Church
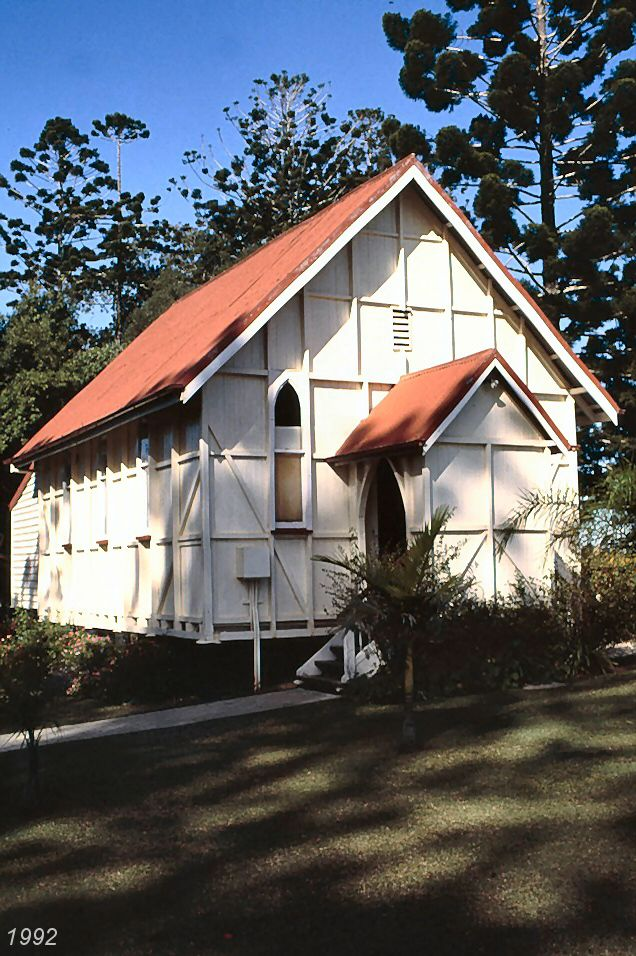
- North Pine (former) Presbyterian Church, 1992
- North Pine (former) Presbyterian Church
- 27.2612°S 152.9531°E
- Address: Dayboro Road, Whiteside, City of Moreton Bay, Queensland
- Country: Australia
- Denomination: Lutheran (since ????)
- Previous denomination: Presbyterian (1883 – ????)

History
- Status: Church
- Founded: 1883
- Dedicated: 8 June 1884 by Rev. Alexander Macintosh

Architecture
- Architectural type: Church
- Style: Gothic Revival
- Years built: 1883 - 1884; 1911
- Construction cost: A£142

Specifications
- Materials: Timber; corrugated iron

Queensland Heritage Register
- Official name: North Pine Presbyterian Church
- Type: State heritage (built)
- Designated: 21 October 1992
- Reference no.: 600767
- Significant period: 1880s-1970s (historical) ongoing (social)
- Significant components: Church, furniture/fittings

North Pine Presbyterian Church is a heritage-listed former Presbyterian and now Lutheran church at Dayboro Road, Whiteside, City of Moreton Bay, Queensland, Australia. The church was built from 1883 to 1884 and was added to the Queensland Heritage Register on 21 October 1992.

As of 2019, the former Presbyterian church building was used for services by the Lutheran Church and other Christian organisations. In January 2021 the Presbyterian congregation of North Pine merged to become part of Christ Central Presbyterian Church, with services conducted in Eatons Hill State School Hall, on Apex Grove, Eatons Hill.

== History ==
This small timber church was built in 1884 at 57 Old Daybro Road, Petrie, and moved to its present site in 1985.

The Redcliffe Agricultural Reserve was opened up for agricultural selection in 1863 and Constance Spry, a local land speculator, purchased the site in December 1866 and sold the 40 acres (16 ha) to William Townsend in February 1867. Ten years later Townsend subdivided the land and sub 1 of portion 32, 1 acre (0.40 ha) was acquired by the Presbyterian Church.

During the 1870s-80s several churches were built in the district's villages, which have since been demolished, destroyed by fire or removed.

The North Pine presbyterian congregation was ministered to from Bald Hills until 1873 when it was constituted a separate congregation. The church at Petrie was built between 1883 and 1884 by a local builder and land holder James Foreman for the sum of £142.

In 1911 the suburb of North Pine was renamed Petrie. At about this time, the front doors of the church were replaced with doors from Tom Petrie's home. During the Second World War the ceiling was inserted.

On 14 June 1916, a Roll of Honour was unveiled for twenty-two parishioners from the area who enlisted for service in World War I.

In 1985 the church was moved to land originally owned by Foreman. Many of the original pews are still used and the pulpit is a copy of the original. The church is one of several historic buildings in the North Pine Country Park Historical Village and is the oldest extant church in the district.

The North Pine Country Park was originally part of the Griffin's Whiteside Run. The land was selected by James Foreman in 1868 and his original dwelling is the residence of the current park caretaker. The land was subsequently purchased by the Hyde family and they continued to farm the land until it was acquired by the Morton Bay Council in 1985.

== Description ==
This single skin timber church with exposed framing has a corrugated iron gable roof and is located at the southern end of Main Street in the North Pine Country Park Historical Village.

The building which shows Gothic Revival influence in its design, sits on concrete stumps and features a front porch with corrugated iron gabled roof. The rectangular plan has an attached rear vestry with weatherboard cladding and a corrugated iron skillion roof.

The porch is entered on both sides via pointed arch openings. The building features sash lancet windows, most with clear glazing, and the rear gable has been clad in weatherboard and both gables have louvred vents to the ceiling space.

Internally, the building has a flat boarded ceiling with the side edges following the rake of the roof. The ceiling has two decorative plaster ceiling vents and four incandescent light fittings of white glass. A triple lancet window behind the pulpit looks into the vestry. Internal walls are of vertically jointed boards with a dado rail.

The vestry has fibrous cement sheeting with timber cover strips to the walls and ceiling which cuts across the top of the centre lancet. The timber floor is one step above the level of the church floor. Furnishings include a number of timber pews of varying designs and a carved timber pulpit with pointed arch carvings.

The park itself is many hectares in size, but the site located on this real property description includes Main Street with a bank, courthouse, store, bakehouse, cell block and public toilets. There are also three cylindrical concrete time capsules and the original homestead's driveway which is lined with mature pine trees. Also included are Petrie Street, Griffin Avenue, Whiteside Street and Kirriwian Lane with Todd's Cottage and a school room.

All buildings, except for the bank, are weatherboard with corrugated iron gable roofs and sit on timber stumps. The bank is weatherboard but has a timber shingle gable roof with the front verandah roof at a lower pitch. The courthouse has a front verandah with a skillion corrugated iron roof and the store has a corrugated iron street awning with a front parapet wall. The bakehouse has a corrugated iron street awning with decorative timber bargeboards to the front gable and a lean-to structure on the northern side.

Todd's Cottage is a single-storeyed building with an attic and has a corrugated iron skillion roofed verandah to the four sides. The school room has a verandah on the eastern side with a lower pitched roof and a small freestanding square room to the south east.

== Heritage listing ==
The North Pine (former) Presbyterian Church was listed on the Queensland Heritage Register on 21 October 1992 having satisfied the following criteria.

The place is important in demonstrating the evolution or pattern of Queensland's history.

The church is one of the few surviving pioneer buildings in the former Pine Rivers Shire.

The place is important in demonstrating the principal characteristics of a particular class of cultural places.

The church is a good example of an 1880s timber church.

The place is important because of its aesthetic significance.

The aesthetic quality of this exposed frame timber church contributes to the townscape of the park.

The place has a strong or special association with a particular community or cultural group for social, cultural or spiritual reasons.

The church is the oldest extant church in the district.
