= Dakabin State High School =

Coordinates: 27°13′50″S 152°58′47″E

- Dakabin, Queensland; Australia

Information
- Type: State high school
- Motto: The Future Lies Within
- Established: 1978
- Years offered: 7–12
- Enrolment: 1,100
- Colours: Blue and white
- Affiliation: Education Queensland

Dakabin State High School is a large secondary school located at Dakabin, a suburb of Brisbane, Queensland, Australia. Dakabin is a co-educational school with approximately 1,100 students enrolling every year.

== School structures ==
Dakabin is divided into six-year levels, with 3 levels of schooling. Junior, Middle & Senior each having a Deputy Principal and Year Coordinator. On a weekly basis, each year level gathers on an assembly to discuss important issues of the week and upcoming events. The staff team of Dakabin comprises a Principal, three Deputy Principals, a Head of Special Education, fourteen Heads of Department, 70+ Teachers, Administration officers, cleaning staff and an agricultural assistant.

Students are also able to access a team of support services including a Guidance Officer, School Based Police Officer, School Nurse, Youth Worker, Indigenous Liaison Officer, School Chaplain, a Youth Support Coordinator, General Practitioner and a Referral Room Coordinator.

== Campus ==
The large school contains many single-level buildings. Each building is purpose-built to accommodate for the curriculum offered. Additionally, the school offers a large multi-purpose Hall, which can allow for upwards of 600 people during presentations. The Hall also allows for three Volleyball courts, indoor Cricket, Basketball and Rock Climbing.

Each classroom contains whiteboards and projection equipment. The school has a large set of laptop computers which are used by students when needed throughout the day.

Each building is surrounded by large open spaces which students can use during lunch breaks, or before school. They are surrounded by extensive native vegetation, which attracts native fauna such as Koalas to the campus.

In 2009, the Hall was extended to accommodate for a new entrance way.

By 2010, a new $2 million science building will be completed. This building will offer two new teaching labs and a computer room.

In 2022, the schools agricultural classrooms completed an upgrade with improved labs, staff rooms, and other facilities.

In 2023, an extensive million dollar upgrade was completed on the Performing Arts and Home Economics building. It created new kitchen and Cafe classrooms for students and refurbished the existing dance and performing arts studios. It also provided needed maintenance and repairs to other classrooms.

=== Agriculture ===
Dakabin State High is home to a large agricultural program. There is a large farm which occupies a significant proportion of the campus, which also accommodates a dam and native vegetation. The dam provides water to the farm. These facilities allow students to gain hand on knowledge of animals and wildlife including cattle, sheep, chickens, geese, peacock and other animals are kept on the premises. There are also various gardens and a hydroponic system which food is grown and repurposed into products for the Home Economics kitchens or animal feed. The farm is managed by the teachers, students and an agricultural assistant.

Having the farm allows students to gain qualifications relating to the operation of agricultural facilities and for the school to compete in sheep and cattle agricultural competitions, which has been a long held tradition. No other school offers an Agriculture Department to the same calibre as Dakabin, due to a lack of facilities.

Until 2016, Dakabin State High was home to Kevin the peacock. A beloved part of the school's culture, Kevin relocated to the school after the demolition of the nearby Alma Park zoo. Kevin died in june 2016. A memorial has since been installed.

=== Design and Technology ===
The school campus contains a number of specialist design and technology classrooms. These include Industrial technologies workshops catering to wood and metal work, Industrial Kitchens, a Cafe space and multiple art classrooms.

== Sport ==
The school focuses on its Dakabin Dragons basketball program. The team has had success in regional, state and national competition. This has led to international excursions for students involved.

Sporting houses
The school offers four sporting houses, which include Bradman, Cuthbert, Elliot and Fraser. Upon enrolment to Dakabin students are placed within these houses. Throughout the year there are opportunities for all students to participate in Swimming Carnivals, Athletics Carnivals and Sports' Days.

Sporting teams
The students are able to further their involvement in sport by joining a sporting team. There are many teams, which include award-winning Basketball, Volleyball, Cricket, Soccer, Football, and Netball teams. These teams often make district, regional and state finals.

Sporting facilities
Other than the multi-purpose Hall, there are extensive sporting facilities available to the students. There are two outdoor multi-purpose courts. One of these allows for Basketball, Tennis and Footstall. The other provides students with netball, volleyball and an additional Basketball court. Additionally, there are three outdoor grass volleyball courts, a cricket pitch and an oval. These facilities are used constantly by students during Interschool Sports Matches, Health and Physical Education lessons and during lunch breaks.

== Academic success ==
The school has had academic success. Students have received high Atar and OP results. In 2007 the percentage of students to receive an OP of between 1 and 15 was 70%. In 2008 the results were very similar. Over these two years, Dakabin's results were within the highest two of the Region.

== Student involvement ==
The students are encouraged to participate in a broad range of community activities as well as in school societies and clubs. As well as the ANZAC Day and Remembrance Day Ceremonies; the 40 Hour Famine, the Salvation Army Red Shield Appeal and the UNIFEM International Women's Day Breakfast are activities that students participate in annually.

In 2012 the school published "Crystal Vision", an eBook literary magazine from the Dakabin State High School Writers Group.

The school occasionally organises performances, with "Lucky Stiff, The Musical" being performed in 2022.
