= Whiteside, Queensland =

Whiteside Queensland
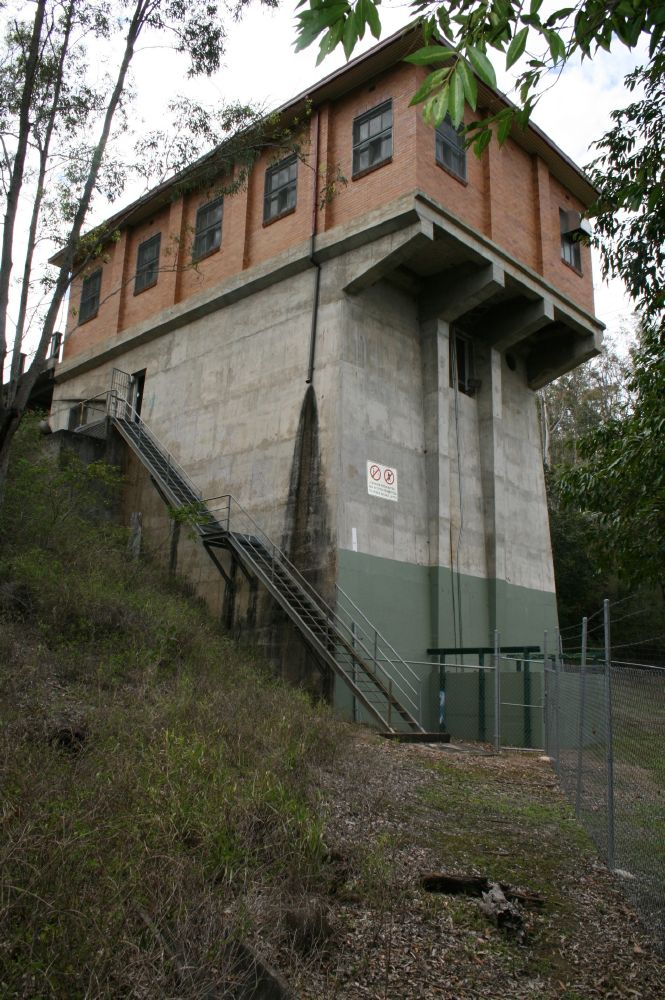
- North Pine Pumping Station, 2007

- Coordinates: 27.2466°S 152.9211°E
- Population: 810 (2021 census)
  - Density: 52.6/km^{2} (136.2/sq mi)
- Postcode(s): 4503
- Area: 15.4 km^{2} (5.9 sq mi)
- Time zone: AEST (UTC+10:00)
- Location: 9.3 km (6 mi) NW of Caboolture; 31 km (19 mi) N of Brisbane CBD
- LGA(s): City of Moreton Bay
- State electorate(s): Kurwongbah
- Federal division(s): Dickson
Suburbs around Whiteside:
| Rush Creek | Kurwongbah | Kurwongbah |
| Samsonvale | Whiteside | Petrie |
| Cashmere | Cashmere | Joyner |

Whiteside is a suburb in the City of Moreton Bay, Queensland, Australia. In the 2021 census, Whiteside had a population of 810 people.

== Geography ==
Whiteside is 26 kilometres (16 mi) from Brisbane CBD. Brisbane–Woodford Road (Dayboro Road) runs along the north-eastern boundary.

The southern and western parts of the locality are now part of Lake Samsonvale, impoundment of the North Pine Dam, as the locality boundaries were not changed after the innundation. The south-western part of Whiteside was known as Harrison's Pocket, but almost all of that land is now underwater.

== History ==
The European history of the area began 1843, when Captain Francis Henry (Frank) Griffin (ca. 1813-1881) became the first free settler to occupy the land. A short time later, Frank was joined by his brothers John and William. In 1845 they were joined by the mother Jane and father Gearbe who was the controlling partner in the property. The run taken up by the Griffins for raising both cattle and sheep, which was named Whiteside, was an extensive portion of 28 square miles of land on the north bank of the North Pine River stretching from the sea coast as far west as Terror's Creek (now Dayboro) and northwards nearly as far as the Caboolture River.

Circa April 1847, it was alleged that servants at the Whiteside sheep station of Captain Francis Griffin mixed flour laced with arsenic and left in a hut with the expectation that Aboriginal people "would visit the hut and make use of the mixture". The act was reportedly in revenge for an aboriginal attack on a hutkeeper, who had been blinded by a blow to the head with a waddy. The servants denied mixing the flour with arsenic, claiming that both were separately kept in the hut and that the Aboriginal people must have combined them.

After the massacre of the 50-60 Aboriginal men, women and children, on 2 March, George Griffin had taken his dray to Brisbane only to discover one of his employees, John Brown, at the court office making a complaint about the massacre. It was reported that George Griffin immediately "galloped back to the station to warn his staff."

Upon being questioned about the massacre, the Griffins did not deny it, but claimed that it had been perpetrated by a servant no longer in their employ. History does not record any search for the alleged perpetrator or further investigation. Circa 1866, Edgar Foreman "saw scores of bleached bones including a complete skeleton" while riding in the vicinity, and heard that "fifty or sixty" Aboriginal people had lost their lives there by poisoning. Freeman claimed John Griffin of the Samsonvale cattle property told him that the deaths were caused by the Aboriginal people stealing from the hut and mixing them into dampers and Johnny cakes as they had seen the white men do and that over 50 Aboriginal people died from eating them.

Further violence occurred in September 1847 when a group of Aboriginal men attacked and killed some of the workers at a saw-pit.

Tom Petrie reported that the killing of this shepherd by Aboriginal people was a punishment under Aboriginal customary law for three Aboriginal people dying after making damper from what they thought was flour taken from the shepherd's hut. He also reported that two or three Aboriginal men had been shot at and one man was stockwhipped by a "white man".

Harrison's Pocket Provisional School opened on 31 January 1876. On 18 February 1884, it became Harrison's Pocket State School. It closed in 1937 due to low student numbers. Instead the children would be taken for free by bus to Strathpine State School. The school was at approx 27.261°S 152.910°E.

== Demographics ==
In the 2011 census, Whiteside had a population of 703 people, 50.4% female and 49.6% male. The median age of the Whiteside population was 47 years, 10 years above the national median of 37. 79.3% of people living in Whiteside were born in Australia. The other top responses for country of birth were England 6.2%, New Zealand 2.7%, Germany 1.6%, United States of America 0.9%, Netherlands 0.9%. 91.5% of people spoke only English at home; the next most common languages were 1.7% Dutch, 1% Spanish, 0.6% Croatian, 0.4% German, 0.4% Italian.

In the 2016 census, Whiteside had a population of 753 people.

In the 2021 census, Whiteside had a population of 810 people.

== Heritage listings ==
Whiteside has a number of heritage-listed sites, including:

- North Pine Presbyterian Church, Dayboro Road (27.2612°S 152.9531°E)
- North Pine Pumping Station, Lake Kurwongbah-Dayboro Road (27.2582°S 152.9506°E)

== Education ==
There are no schools in Whiteside. The nearest government primary schools are Petrie State School is in neighbouring Petrie to the south-east and Dayboro State School in Dayboro to the north-west. The nearest government secondary school is Bray Park State High School in Bray Park to the south-east. There are a number of non-government schools in Petrie and surrounding suburbs.
