= Sideling Creek Dam =

- Location of the Sideling Creek Dam in Queensland
- Country: Australia
- Location: South East Queensland
- Coordinates: 27°15′28″S 152°57′7″E
- Purpose: Potable water supply; Recreation
- Status: Operational
- Opening date: 1958
- Operator: SEQ Water

Dam and spillways
- Type of dam: Embankment dam
- Impounds: Sideling Creek
- Height: 23 m (75 ft)
- Length: 500 m (1,600 ft)
- Dam volume: 280×10^{3} m^{3} (9.9×10^{6} cu ft)
- Spillway type: Uncontrolled
- Spillway capacity: 710 m^{3}/s (25,000 cu ft/s)

Reservoir
- Creates: Lake Kurwongbah
- Total capacity: 14,500 ML (3.2×10^{9} imp gal; 3.8×10^{9} US gal)
- Catchment area: 53 km^{2} (20 sq mi)
- Surface area: 320 ha (790 acres)
- Website www.seqwater.com.au

The Sideling Creek Dam is an earth-fill embankment dam with an un-gated spillway across the Sideling Creek in Kurwongbah, City of Moreton Bay, Queensland, Australia. The main purposes of the dam are for potable water supply of the City of Moreton Bay and for recreation. The impounded reservoir is called Lake Kurwongbah.

== Location and features ==
The dam is located 2 kilometres (1.2 mi) east of North Pine Dam and 4 kilometres (2.5 mi) northwest of Petrie. The primary inflow is Sideling Creek, a tributary of the North Pine River. To the east of the dam is the Lakeside Park motor racing circuit.

Completed in 1958,^{1} the earthfill dam structure is 23 metres (75 ft) high and 500 metres (1,600 ft) long. The 280-thousand-cubic-metre (9.9×10^{6} cu ft) dam wall holds back the 14,500-megalitre (3.2×10^{9} imp gal; 3.8×10^{9} US gal) reservoir when at full capacity. From a catchment area of 53 square kilometres (20 sq mi) that includes the localities of Petrie, Kallangur and Dakabin, the dam creates Lake Kurwongbah, with a surface area of 320 hectares (790 acres). The uncontrolled un-gated spillway has a discharge capacity of 710 cubic metres per second (25,000 cu ft/s). The dam is now managed by Seqwater.

From April 2018 to May 2020, Seqwater carried out an upgrade of Sideling Creek Dam as part of its Dam Improvement Program.

== Recreational activities ==
Access to Lake Kurwongbah is via Dayboro Road, with picnic facilities located at Mick Hanfling Park on the lake's eastern shores. Water skiing is allowed and rowing is another popular recreational activity provided by the dam. The lake has been used for professional level radio controlled model yacht competitions, although has moved more recently to a pond adjacent to the motor racing circuit at Lakeside Park. It was the proposed venue for rowing in Brisbane's failed bid for the 1992 Olympic Games.

Motor racing has been held Lakeside International Raceway, as it was originally known since 1961 and has hosted the Australian Grand Prix and Australian Touring Car Championship, amongst other events.

=== Fishing ===
The reservoir is stocked with silver perch, golden perch and bass. Spangled perch and forktail catfish are present in the dam naturally. Only bank angling is permitted on Lake Kurwongbah.

== See also ==
- List of dams in Queensland
