= Narangba railway station =

Railway station in Queensland, Australia

Narangba
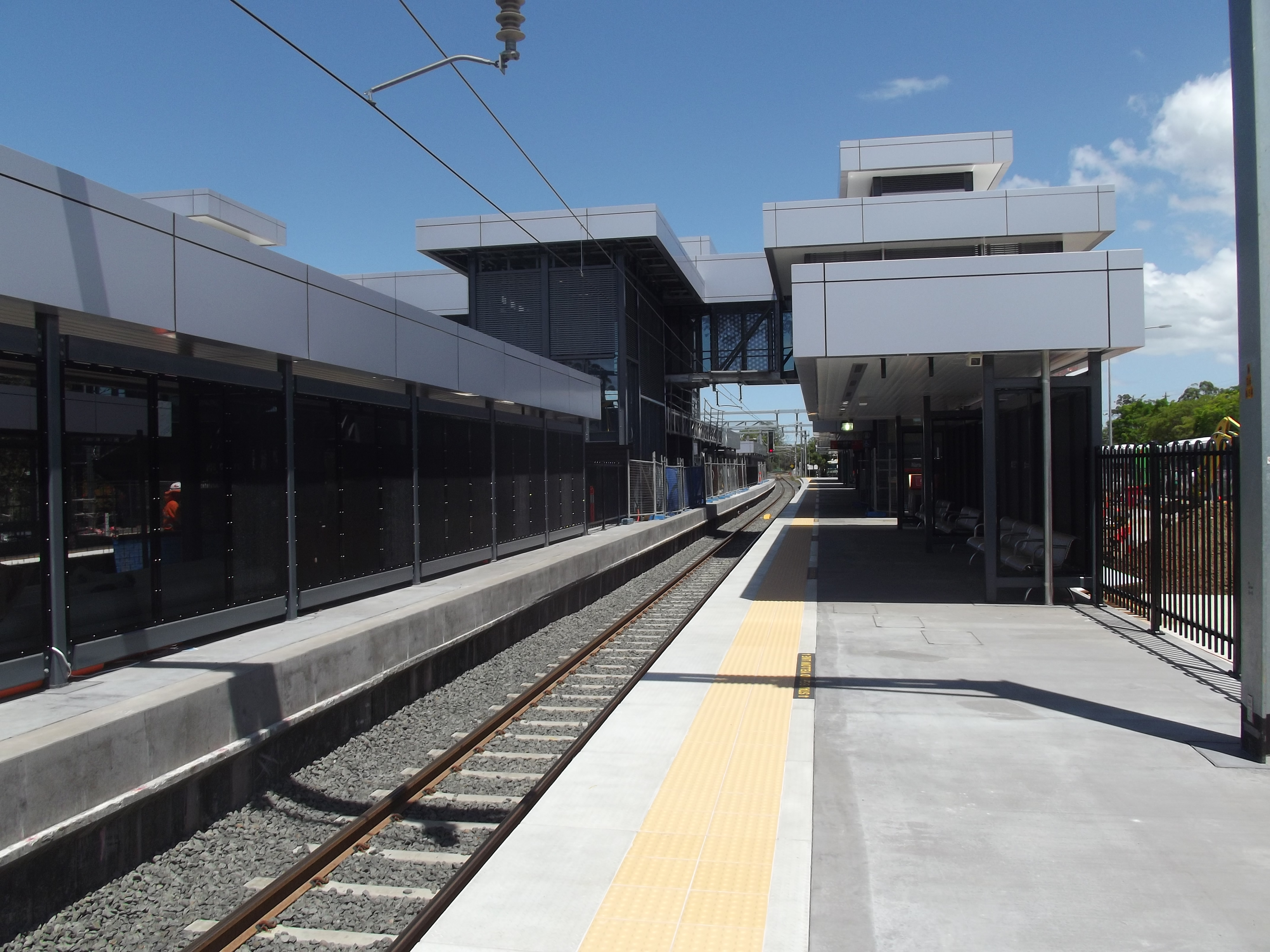
- Southbound view from Platform 3 in December 2012

General information
- Location: Burpengary Road, Narangba
- Coordinates: 27.2023°S 152.9599°E
- Elevation: 45 m (148 ft)
- Owner: Queensland Rail
- Operator: Queensland Rail
- Lines: T1 Caboolture; T1 Nambour/Gympie North
- Distance: 35.66 kilometres from Central
- Platforms: 3 side

Construction
- Structure type: Ground
- Parking: 363
- Cycle facilities: Yes
- Accessible: Yes

Other information
- Status: Staffed part-time
- Station code: 600469 (platform 1); 600470 (platform 2); 600471 (platform 3)
- Fare zone: Zone 3
- Website: Queensland Rail

History
- Opened: 1888
- Rebuilt: 2013
- Former names: Sideling Creek

Services
Preceding station	Queensland Rail	Following station
Dakabin towards Ipswich or Rosewood via Roma Street	T1 Caboolture line	Burpengary towards Caboolture
Dakabin towards Ipswich or Rosewood via Roma Street	T1 Nambour/Gympie North line	Burpengary towards Nambour
Location

Narangba is a railway station operated by Queensland Rail on the Caboolture and Nambour/Gympie North lines. It opened in 1888 and serves the Moreton Bay suburb of Narangba. It is a ground level station, featuring three side platforms.

== History ==
Narangba station first opened in 1888 as Sideling Creek. In 2013, an upgrade of the station was completed. The upgrade included a new footbridge and lifts. While the upgrade was underway, platform 3 was closed, with northbound services using platform 2.

== Services ==
Narangba station is served by all Citytrain network services from Nambour and Caboolture to Roma Street, many continuing to Springfield Central, Ipswich and Rosewood.

== Platforms and services ==
Nerangba platform arrangement
Platform	Lines	Destinations	Notes
1	T1 Caboolture	Roma Street (to Ipswich/Rosewood line)	
1	T1 Nambour/Gympie North	Roma Street (to Ipswich/Rosewood line)	
2	T1 Caboolture	No scheduled services	
3	T1 Caboolture	Caboolture	
3	T1 Nambour/Gympie North	Nambour	

== Transport Links ==
Kangaroo Bus Lines operates two bus routes to and from Narangba station:

- 663: Narangba loop service
- 668: to North Lakes
