= Wildlife HQ Zoo =

- Wildlife HQ Zoo logo
- Interactive map of Wildlife HQ Zoo
- 26°40′21.62″S 152°59′26.81″E
- Date opened: 2013
- Location: Woombye, Queensland, Australia
- Memberships: ZAA
- Website: whqzoo.com

Wildlife HQ Zoo (formerly Queensland Zoo), is located at the Big Pineapple, Woombye, Queensland on the Sunshine Coast, Queensland and opened in November 2013. In March 2014 many animals were relocated from the now closed Alma Park Zoo.

== Opening hours ==
The zoo is open every day of the year except Christmas Day. It is open between 9am and 4pm with the last entry at 3pm.

== Animals ==
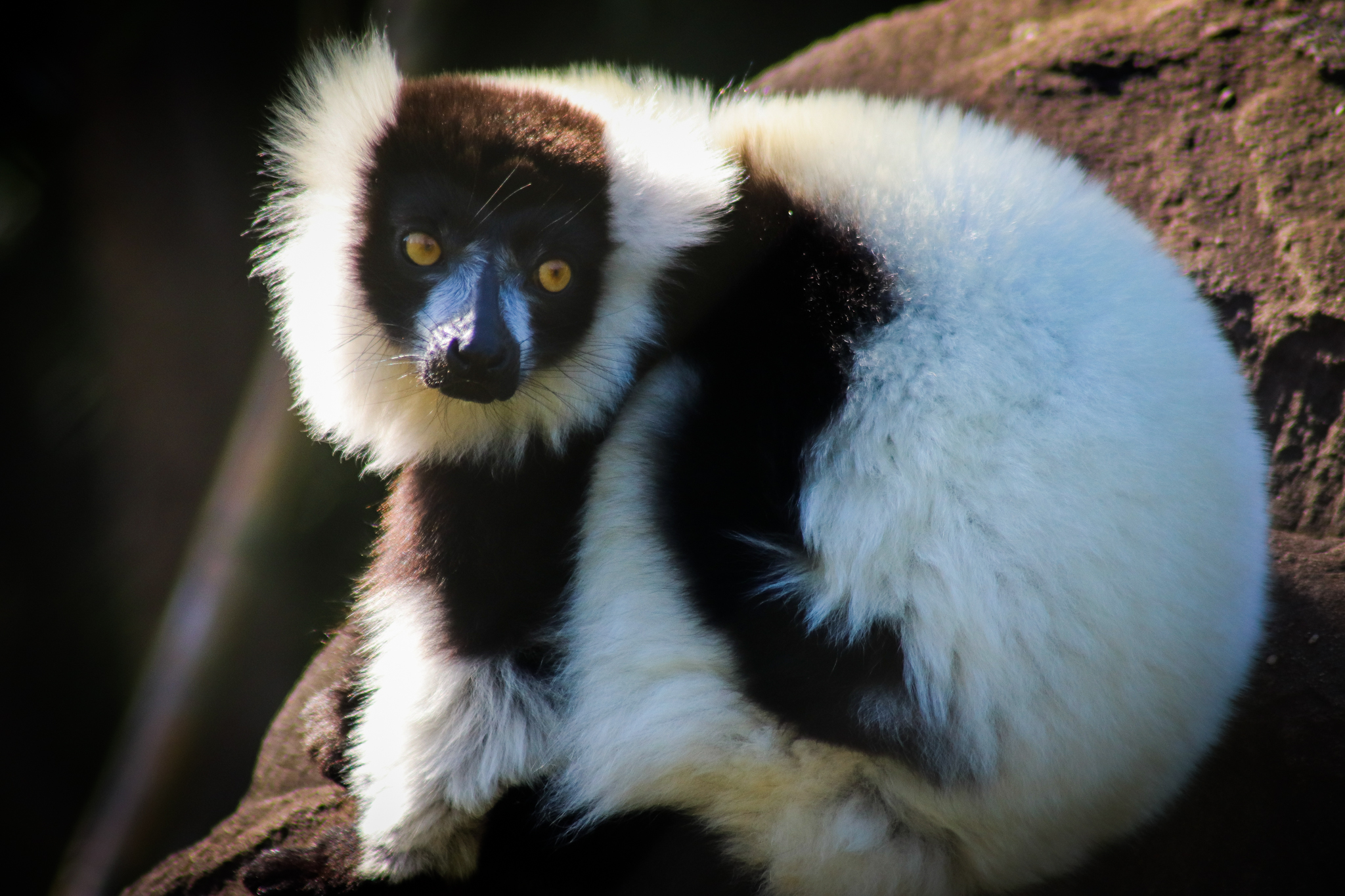
Black-and-white ruffed lemur

Wildlife HQ has a range of species from around the world. Currently eleven species of bird are kept at the zoo including red-tailed black cockatoos, sulphur-crested cockatoos, southern cassowaries, emu, laughing kookaburra and tawny frogmouths. The zoo currently has more than twenty-five exotic mammal species (including thirteen primate species presently) and continue to expand their species holdings. The zoo also houses several Australian species of mammals including koalas, wallabies, kangaroos, bettongs, potoroos, quokkas, quoll, a wombat and an echidna. The majority of the zoo's reptile collection is exhibited in the ‘’Reptile Barn’’ which displays a diverse collection of non-venomous snakes, lizards and tortoises.

Complete species (and subspecies) list of animals at the zoo below.

Birds

- Australian masked owl
- Blue peafowl
- Cape Barren goose
- Eclectus parrot
- Emu
- Helmeted guineafowl
- Laughing kookaburra
- Red-tailed black cockatoo
- Southern cassowary
- Sulphur-crested cockatoo
- Tawny frogmouth

Mammals

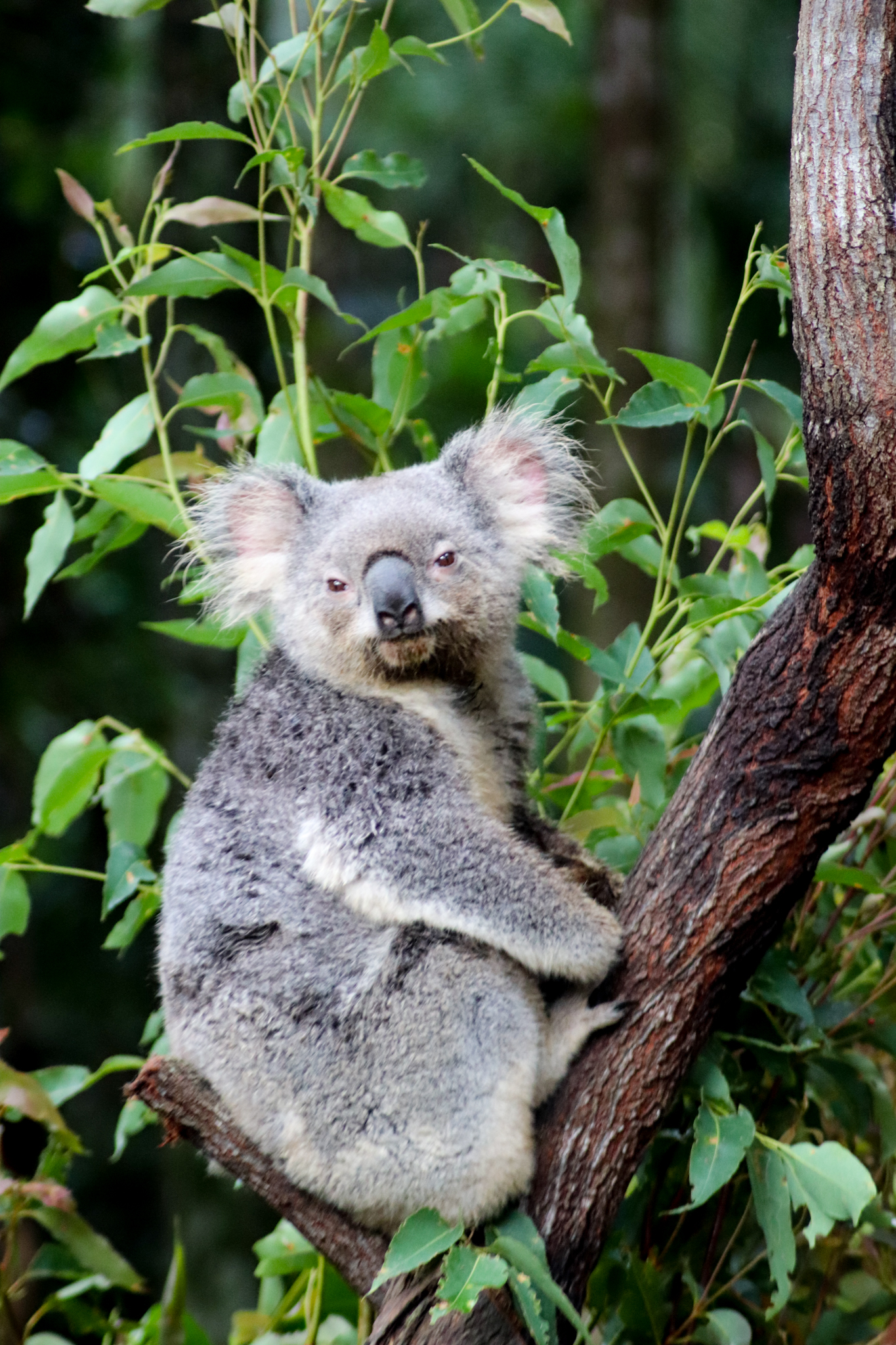
Koala

- African wild dog
- Alpaca
- Bilby
- Binturong
- Black-and-white ruffed lemur
- Blackbuck
- Black-capped capuchin
- Black-handed spider monkey
- Bolivian squirrel monkey
- Brush-tailed rock-wallaby
- Cape porcupine
- Capybara
- Cotton-top tamarin
- Dingo
- Domestic guinea pig
- Eastern grey kangaroo
- Eastern quoll
- Emperor tamarin
- Fallow deer
- Fennec fox
- Golden lion tamarin
- Goodfellow's tree-kangaroo
- Hamadryas baboon
- Koala
- Long-nosed potoroo
- Lumholtz's tree-kangaroo
- Maned wolf
- Meerkat
- Miniature pony
- Mountain brushtail possum
- Night monkey
- Northern white-cheeked gibbon
- Pygmy marmoset
- Quokka
- Red-necked wallaby
- Red kangaroo
- Red panda
- Red-rumped agouti
- Ring-tailed lemur
- Rufous bettong
- Short-beaked echidna
- Siamang
- Southern hairy-nosed wombat
- Squirrel glider
- Sugar glider
- Sun bear
- Swamp wallaby
- Tasmanian devil
- White-tufted marmoset

Reptiles

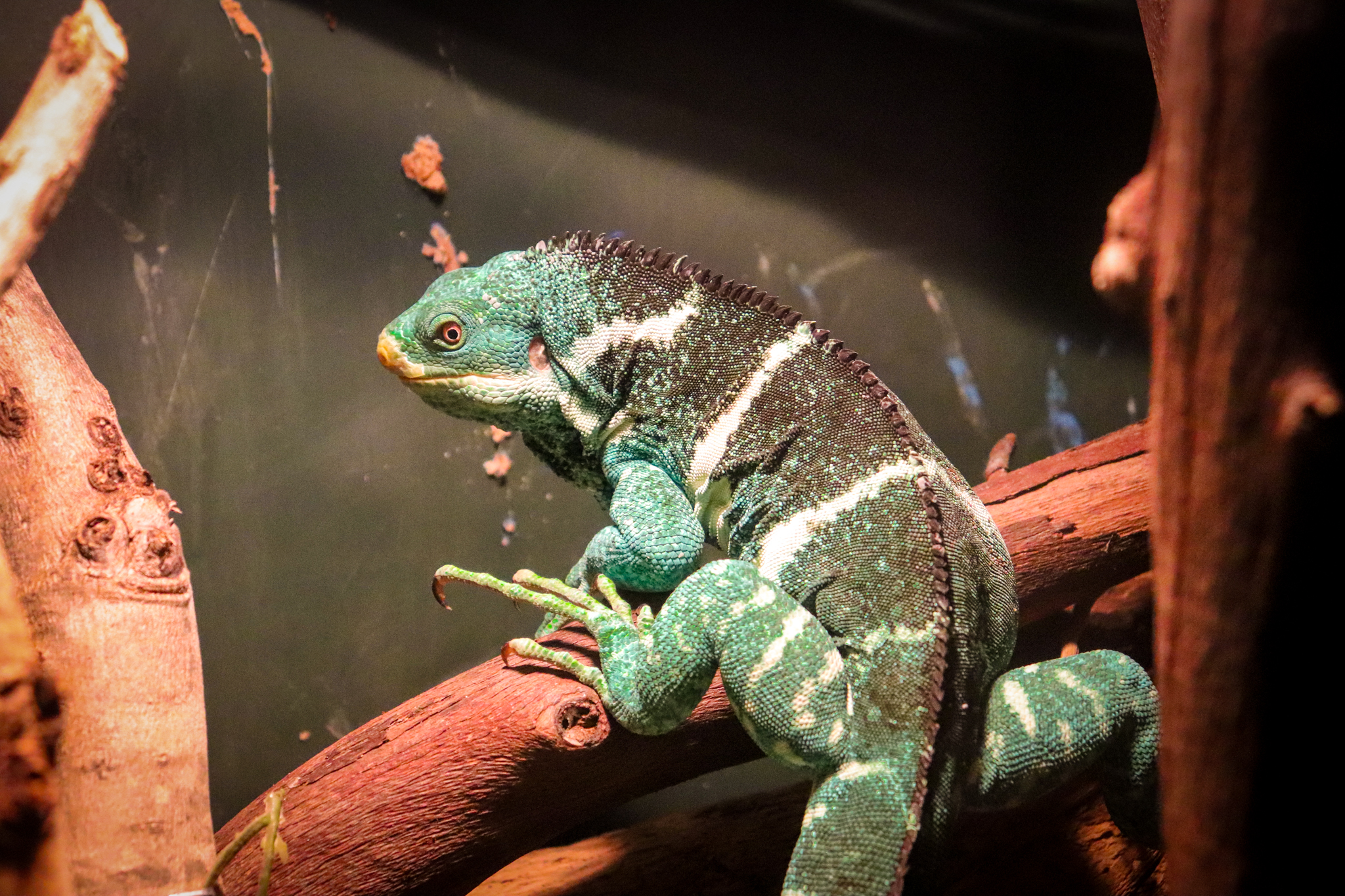
Fijian crested iguana

- Alligator snapping turtle
- American alligator
- Ball python
- Black-headed python
- Boa constrictor
- Boyd's forest dragon
- Burmese python
- Central bearded dragon
- Central netted dragon
- Corn snake
- Darwin carpet python
- Diamond carpet python
- Eastern blue-tongued lizard
- Fijian crested iguana
- Gilbert's lashtail dragon
- Green iguana
- Green tree python
- Jungle carpet python
- Lace monitor
- Plumed basilisk
- Radiated tortoise
- Rhinoceros iguana
- Saltwater crocodile
- Shingleback lizard
- Spencer's goanna
- Spotted tree monitor
- Woma python

== Incidents ==
In April 2014, a tarantula was stolen from the zoo.

In May 2014, there were concerns that a local music festival would impact the animals at the zoo.
