= Petrie railway station =

Railway station in Queensland, Australia

Petrie
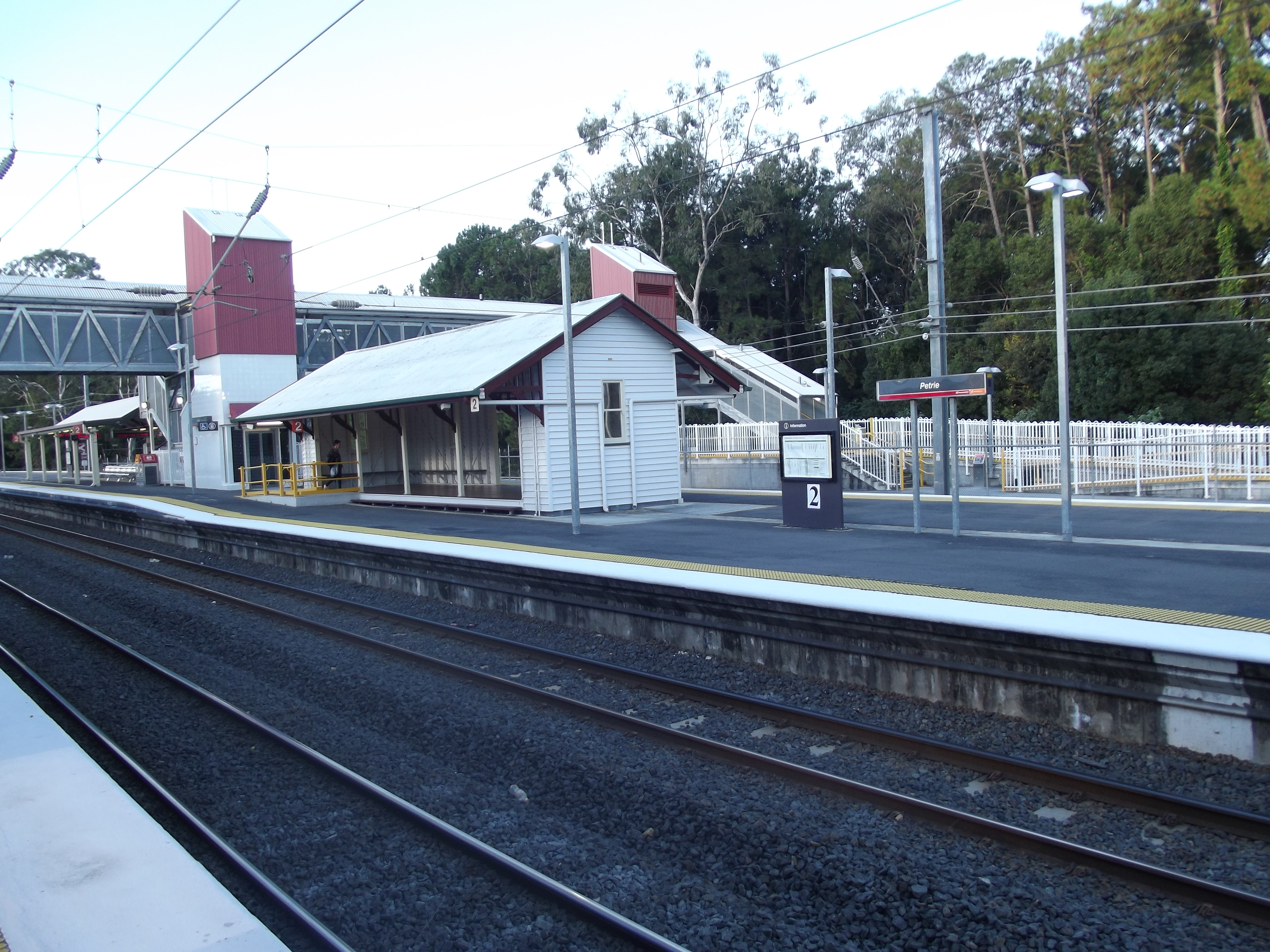
- Northbound view from Platform 1 in May 2012

General information
- Location: Station Street, Petrie
- Coordinates: 27.2679°S 152.9818°E
- Elevation: 9 m (30 ft)
- Owner: Queensland Rail
- Operator: Queensland Rail
- Lines: Caboolture; Redcliffe Peninsula; Sunshine Coast
- Distance: 27.49 kilometres from Central
- Platforms: 5 (1 side, 2 island)

Construction
- Structure type: Ground
- Accessible: Yes

Other information
- Station code: 600464 (platform 1); 600465 (platform 2); 600466 (platform 3); 600627 (platform 4); 600645 (platform 5)
- Fare zone: Zone 3
- Website: Queensland Rail

History
- Former names: North Pine

Services
Preceding station	Queensland Rail	Following station
Northgate towards Ipswich or Rosewood via Roma Street	Caboolture line	Dakabin towards Caboolture
Lawnton towards Springfield Central via Roma Street	Redcliffe Peninsula line	Kallangur towards Kippa-Ring
Northgate towards Ipswich or Rosewood via Roma Street	Sunshine Coast	Dakabin towards Nambour
Northgate towards Ipswich or Rosewood via Roma Street	Sunshine Coast Gympie North service	Caboolture towards Gympie North
Location

Petrie is a railway station operated by Queensland Rail on the Caboolture, Redcliffe Peninsula and Sunshine Coast lines. It opened in 1888 as North Pine and serves the Moreton Bay suburb of Petrie. It is a ground level station, featuring two island platforms with two faces each and one side platform.

The station was renamed in July 1911 following the death of local pioneer Thomas Petrie.

As part of the Redcliffe Peninsula line, the station was expanded with a new island platform built east of the existing platforms. It opened along with the rest of the line on 4 October 2016. As part of the project, a third track was added south of the station to Lawnton. North of the station, the Redcliffe Peninsula line branches off.

== Services ==
Petrie is served by all City network services from Gympie North, Nambour, Caboolture & Kippa-Ring to Brisbane, many continuing to Ipswich, Rosewood and Springfield Central.

== Services by platform ==
Petrie platform arrangement
Platform	Lines	Destinations	Notes
1		Used as bypass track for northbound express services	
2	Caboolture	Caboolture	
2	Sunshine Coast	Nambour & Gympie North	
3	Redcliffe Peninsula	Kippa-Ring	
4	Caboolture	Roma Street, Springfield Central, Ipswich & Rosewood	
4	Sunshine Coast	Roma Street, Springfield Central & Ipswich	
5	Redcliffe Peninsula	Roma Street, Springfield Central & Ipswich	

== Transport links ==
Prior to the October 2016 opening of the Redcliffe Peninsula line, Petrie station was served by 10 bus routes connecting it to nearby suburbs, but after the opening only two remain.

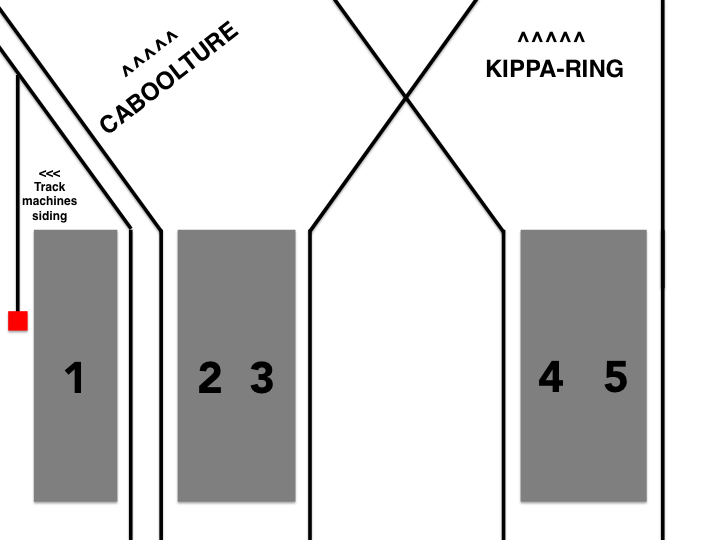
A trackplan of Petrie station.

Hornibrook Bus Lines operate two bus routes via Petrie station:

- 680: Redcliffe to Westfield Chermside
- 686: to Frenchs Forest
