= Begonia sikkimensis =

Scientific classification
- Kingdom: Plantae
- Clade: Tracheophytes
- Clade: Angiosperms
- Clade: Eudicots
- Clade: Rosids
- Order: Cucurbitales
- Family: Begoniaceae
- Genus: Begonia
- Species: B. sikkimensis

Binomial name
- Begonia sikkimensis A.DC.

Species of flowering plant

Begonia sikkimensis is a species of flowering plant in the family Begoniaceae, native to Tibet, Nepal, the eastern Himalayas, Assam, and Myanmar. With its highly dissected leaves it resembles Begonia U614, but that as yet undescribed species is rhizomatous, and Begonia sikkimensis is caulescent.

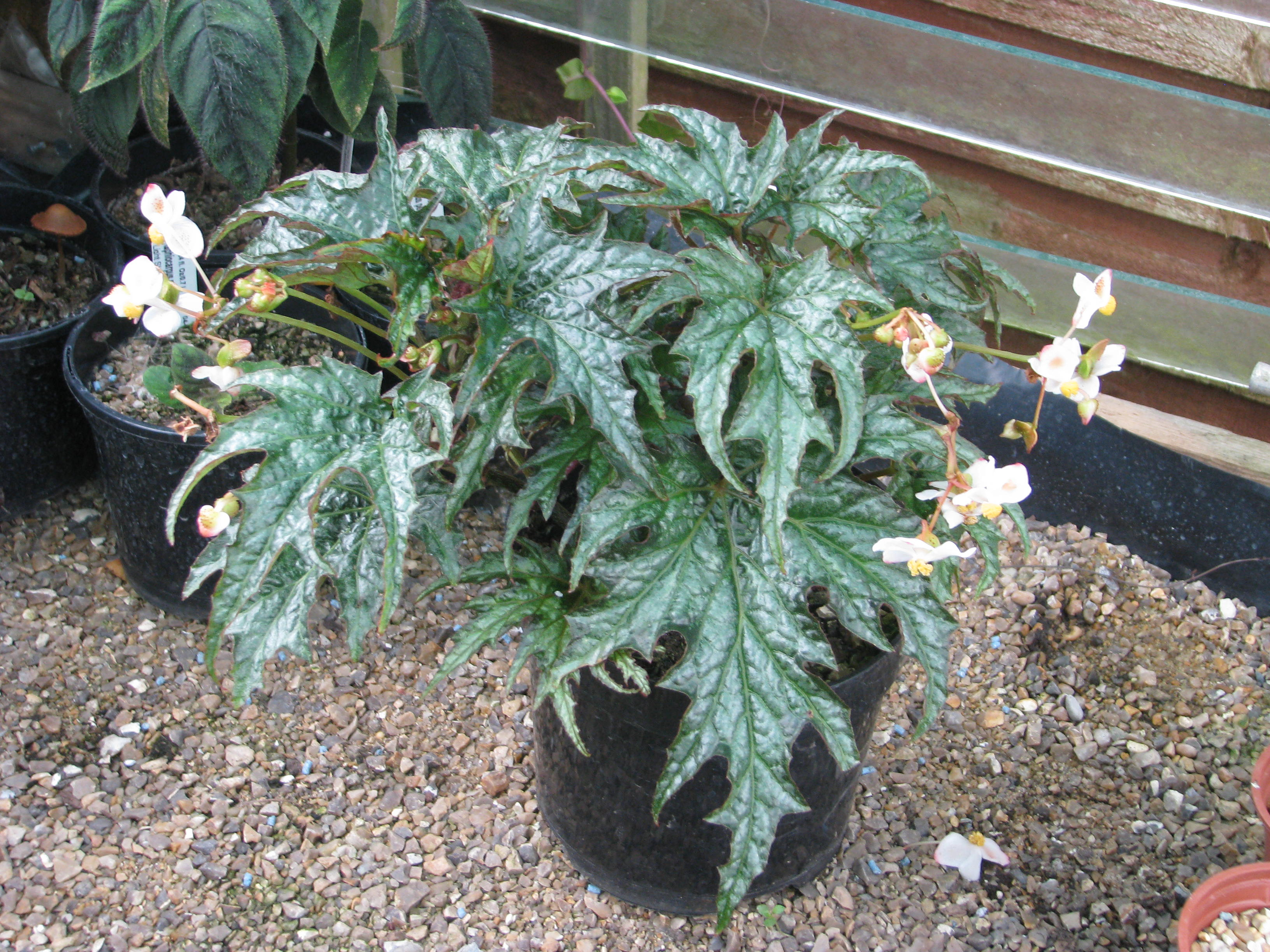
Probably Begonia U614, probably sold as Begonia sikkimensis

== Subtaxa ==
The following varieties are accepted:

- Begonia sikkimensis var. kamengensis Rekha Morris, P.D.McMillan & Golding
- Begonia sikkimensis var. sikkimensis
