= Kurwongbah, Queensland =

Kurwongbah Queensland
- Coordinates: 27.2255°S 152.9194°E
- Population: 1,552 (2021 census)
  - Density: 36.60/km^{2} (94.80/sq mi)
- Postcode(s): 4503
- Area: 42.4 km^{2} (16.4 sq mi)
- Time zone: AEST (UTC+10:00)
- Location: 13.3 km (8 mi) N of Strathpine; 18.3 km (11 mi) S of Caboolture; 20.8 km (13 mi) W of Redcliffe; 37.2 km (23 mi) N of Brisbane CBD
- LGA(s): City of Moreton Bay
- State electorate(s): Kurwongbah
- Federal division(s): Dickson
Suburbs around Kurwongbah:
Narangba	Narangba	Narangba
Rush Creek	Kurwongbah	Dakabin; Kallangur
Whiteside	Whiteside	Petrie

Kurwongbah is a rural locality in the City of Moreton Bay, Queensland, Australia. In the 2021 census, Kurwongbah had a population of 1,552 people.

== Geography ==
A section of the eastern boundary of the locality is roughly aligned with the North Coast railway line.

In the south east of the locality is Sideling Creek Dam which created the reservoir Lake Kurwongbah (27.2486°S 152.9575°E). On the shores of the lake is Lakeside Park, a motor racing venue.

A large quarry in the south is accessed by Dunlop Lane and owned by Holcim. Working collaboratively with the local Land for Wildlife group, the quarry's buffer zones have been cleared of weeds and regenerated as natural bushland, restoring local wildlife, such as birds, reptiles and butterflies.

Brisbane–Woodford Road (Dayboro Road) runs along the south-western boundary.

== History ==
The name Kurwongbah is alleged to be the Kabi name for Sideling Creek, meaning "black duck". The name was chosen by a local newspaper competition in 1958.

Sideling Creek Dam was commissioned in 1957. It impounds Sideling Creek, a tributary of the Pine River.

Kurwongbah State School opened on 28 January 1986. Despite the name, it is within the suburb boundaries of neighbouring Petrie.

== Demographics ==
In the 2011 census, Kurwongbah had a population of 1,420 people, 48.5% female and 51.5% male. The median age of the Kurwongbah population was 38 years, 1 year above the national median of 37. 81.4% of people living in Kurwongbah were born in Australia. The other top responses for country of birth were England 4.2%, New Zealand 3.6%, South Africa 1.4%, Netherlands 0.6%, Germany 0.5%. 93.8% of people spoke only English at home; the next most common languages were 0.6% Dutch, 0.4% Italian, 0.3% Indonesian, 0.2% Afrikaans, 0.2% German.

In the 2016 census, Kurwongbah had a population of 1,430 people.

In the 2021 census, Kurwongbah had a population of 1,552 people.

== Education ==
There are no schools in Kurwongbah. The nearest government primary schools are Petrie State School and Kurwongbah State School, both in neighbouring Petrie to the south-east, and Narangba State School and Narangba Valley State School, both in neighbouring Narangba to the north. The nearest government secondary schools are Narangba Valley State High School in neighbouring Narangba to the north, Dakabin State High School in neighbouring Dakabin to the east, and Bray Park State High School in Bray Park to the south-east.
