= Alma Park Zoo =

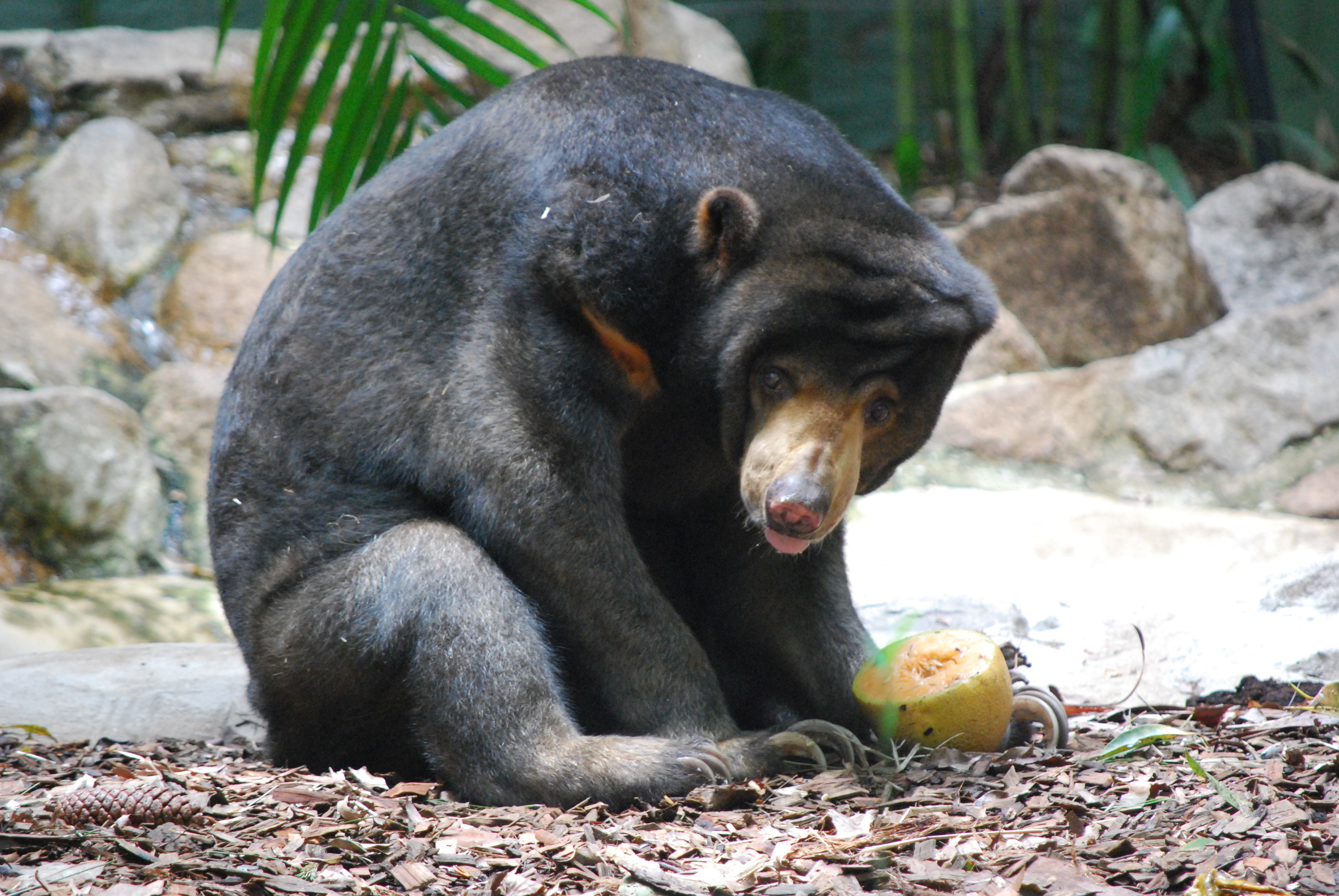
- Sun bear at Alma Park Zoom, 2010
- Interactive map of Alma Park Zoo
- 27°13′36.25″S 152°58′57.60″E
- Date opened: 1969
- Date closed: 31 March 2014
- Location: Dakabin, Queensland, Australia
- Land area: 40 acres (16 ha)
- No. of animals: 229
- No. of species: 53
- Website: www.almaparkzoo.com.au

Alma Park Zoo was a 40-acre (16 ha) zoo located in Alma Road, Dakabin in the City of Moreton Bay, Queensland, Australia. The park was filled with Australian and exotic species. It opened in 1969. When it closed in 2014, Alma Park Zoo was the oldest zoo in Queensland.

== Attractions ==
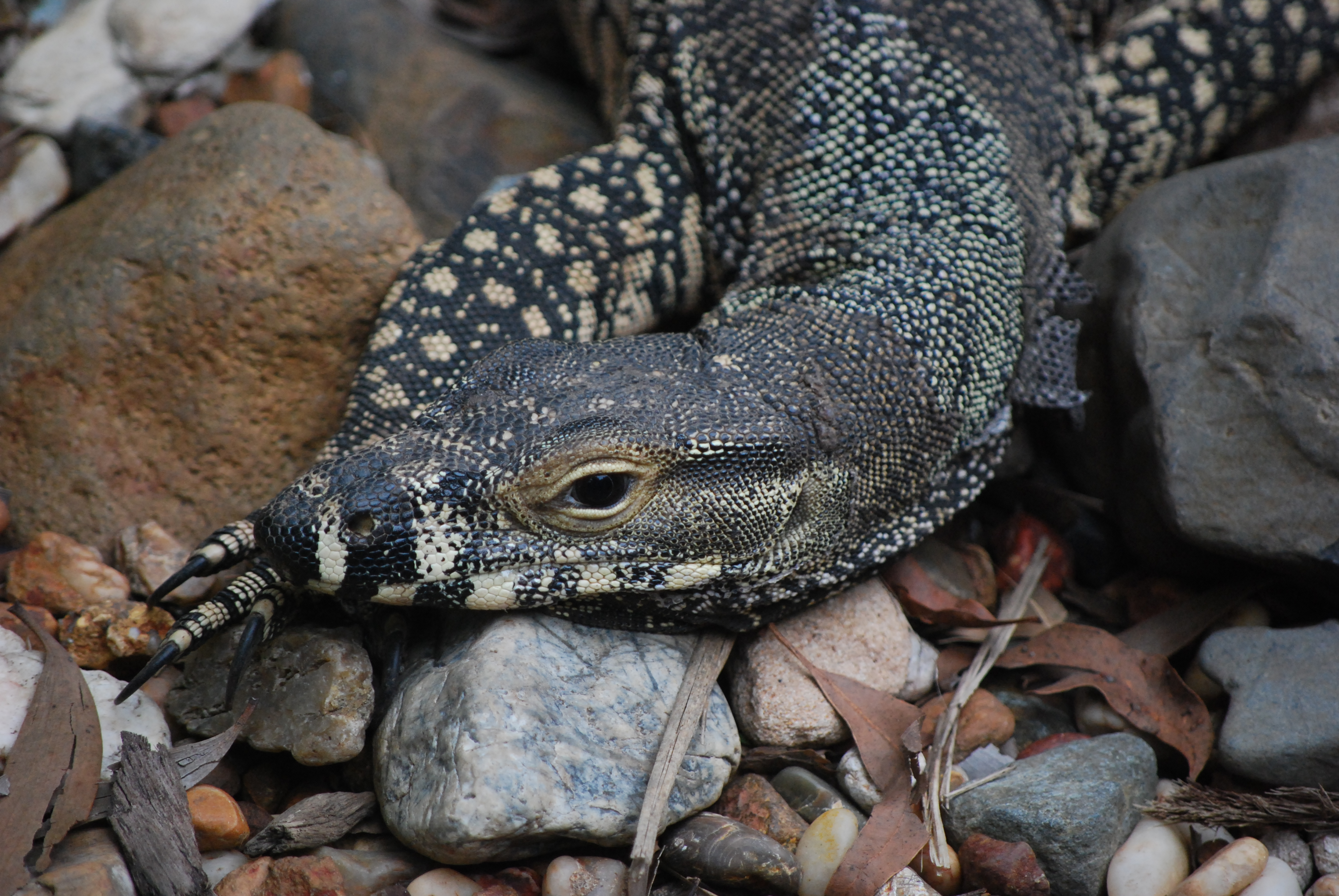
Lace monitor at the zoo, 2010

Alma Park Zoo was fully landscaped with walking paths through tropical gardens under a canopy of rainforest trees and plants. A number of enclosures were walkthrough, such as the wallaby and kangaroo enclosures.

Koalas, snakes and crocodiles could be patted and guests also had the opportunity to be photographed with these animals. Exotic animals in the collection included sun bears and numerous primate species.

=== Lemur island ===
Lemur island was a tropical zone in the northern part of the zoo. It had a wooden cabin to protect the lemurs from bad weather conditions such as rain.

Reptiles could be also found on the island such as tortoises and eastern water dragons.

== History ==
The zoo was owned by Bill Williams who also owned a business called WW Shock Absorbers, but was built by workers, led by Leroy Pidgeon, who lived with his family in the caretakers cottage in the zoo at the time. Leroy also recovered, transported and replanted many of the mature palm trees that were a statement of the zoo. These came from older farm blocks around Brisbane that were being sub divided in the early 1970s period and Bill Williams had struck deals to acquire them.

The zoo closed on 31 March 2014 and many of the animals were transferred to Wildlife HQ Zoo. There were plans for the zoo to open in Logan City; however, this plan was cancelled in May 2015.

Alma Park Zoo was open every day from 9 am to 4 pm, excluding Christmas Day and reduced hours on ANZAC Day (25 April).

== See also ==
- Tourism in Brisbane
