= Dakabin, Queensland =

Dakabin
- Suburb
- Interactive map of Dakabin
- Coordinates: 27.2233°S 152.9852°E
- Country: Australia
- State: Queensland
- City: Moreton Bay
- LGA: City of Moreton Bay
- Location: 9.2 km (5.7 mi) N of Strathpine; 34.3 km (21.3 mi) N of Brisbane CBD

Government
  - State electorate: Blair G MP
  - Federal division: Longman

Area
  - Total: 5.7 km^{2} (2.2 sq mi)

Population
  - Total: 5,275 (2021 census)
  - Density: 925/km^{2} (2,397/sq mi)
- Time zone: UTC+10:00 (AEST)
- Postcode: 4503
Suburbs around Dakabin
Kurwongbah	Narangba	Narangba
Kurwongbah	Dakabin	North Lakes
Kurwongbah	Kallangur	North Lakes

Dakabin is a locality in the City of Moreton Bay, Queensland, Australia. In the 2021 census, Dakabin had a population of 5,275 people.

== Geography ==
The western boundary is aligned with the North Coast railway line while the eastern boundary follows the Bruce Highway.

== History ==
The origin of the suburb name is from the Yugarabul Indigenous Australian language meaning grass tree or grass root.

Alma Park Zoo opened in 1969. it was a 20-acre (8.1 ha) park which contained Australian and exotic species as well as tropical gardens. It was proposed to relocate the zoo to Logan City in 2011, but on 31 March 2014 the zoo relocated to The Big Pineapple.

Dakabin State High School opened on 23 January 1978.

Northpine Christian College opened in Dakabin on 1 March 1978. The school originally opened in Zillmere in 1953, but the school building was destroyed in a fire in February 1978, resulting in its relocation to Dakabin. The school only provided primary schooling until 1984 when secondary schooling to Year 10 was added. In 1996 the school expanded to full secondary schooling (to Year 12).

== Demographics ==
In the 2011 census, Dakabin recorded a population of 1,447 people, 50.3% female and 49.7% male. The median age of the Dakabin population was 33 years, 4 years below the national median of 37. 78.5% of people living in Dakabin were born in Australia. The other top responses for country of birth were New Zealand 4.9%, England 4.7%, South Africa 1.5%, Scotland 0.9%, United States of America 0.8%. 92.9% of people spoke only English at home; the next most common languages were 0.6% Auslan, 0.6% Sinhalese, 0.4% Malayalam, 0.3% Russian, 0.3% Hindi.

In the 2016 census, Dakabin had a population of 3,540 people.

In the 2021 census, Dakabin had a population of 5,275 people.

== Education ==
Northpine Christian College is a private primary and secondary (Prep–12) school for boys and girls at 29 Hughes Road East (27.2210°S 152.9850°E). In 2018, the school had an enrolment of 896 students with 65 teachers (61 full-time equivalent) and 36 non-teaching staff (26 full-time equivalent). It is affiliated with the Seventh-day Adventist Church.

Dakabin State High School is a government secondary (7–12) school for boys and girls at Marsden Road (27.2296°S 152.9808°E). In 2018, the school had an enrolment of 905 students with 92 teachers (85 full-time equivalent) and 48 non-teaching staff (34 full-time equivalent). It includes a special education program and an intensive English language program.

There is no government primary school in Dakabin. Despite its name, Dakabin State School is located in neighbouring Kallangur.

== Sport ==
North Pine United Soccer Club play out of Bob Brock Park. They are currently part of the Football Queensland Premier League. Bob Brock Park has two cricket fields and three soccer fields.

== Transport ==
Dakabin railway station provides access to regular Queensland Rail City network services to Brisbane and Ipswich, as well as Caboolture and the Sunshine Coast.

The station has been upgraded providing elevators for wheelchairs and bikes. Also, there is a raised section of the platform for easier access.
