= AFL Queensland Schools Cup =

Australian rules football competition

- Most recent season or competition: 2026 AFL Queensland season
- Sport: Australian rules football
- Founded: 2016; 10 years ago in Brisbane, Queensland
- First season: 2016
- No. of teams: 937
- Region: Queensland
- Venue: Maroochydore Multisports Complex
- Confederation: AFL Queensland
- Website: https://play.afl/queensland/schools/aflq-schools-cup

The AFL Queensland Schools Cup is an Australian rules football competition organised by the AFL Queensland, contested by schools from across the state of Queensland.

Founded in 2016 it consists of a knockout tournament starting from several regional tournaments finalizing to a state championship series held at the Maroochydore Multisports Complex. Since its inception, it has continuously generated a great amount of participation, recently having 937 teams competing for the 2026 competition.

== Schools of Excellence ==
AFL Queensland runs the Schools of Excellence competition to identify the schools around South East Queensland that operates their AFL program to a high standard. These schools play against each other in a round robin competition throughout the year, with the higher placing schools earning an automatic entry into the State Quarter or Semi Finals for the Schools Cup. As of 2025 the program has 13 schools:

School	Location	School colours	Joined
Bribie Island State High School	Moreton Bay	Navy blue and yellow	2025
Brisbane South State Secondary College	Brisbane	Purple and green	2022
Helensvale State High School	Gold Coast	Navy blue and green	2007
Mountain Creek State High School	Sunshine Coast	Navy blue and fuchsia	2012
Narangba Valley State High School	Moreton Bay	Navy blue, green and gold	2007
Pacific Pines State High School	Gold Coast	Green, blue and red	2018
Palm Beach Currumbin State High School	Gold Coast	Red and white	2007
Park Ridge State High School	Logan	Green and white	2007
Southport State High School	Gold Coast	Sky blue and navy blue	2018
Springwood State High School	Logan	Green, gold and black	2022
Sunshine Beach State High School	Sunshine Coast	Blue and green	2025
Woodcrest State College	Ipswich	Black, green and gold	2017
Varsity College	Gold Coast	Navy, gold, and grey	2023

== Schools Cup Premiers ==
=== Senior Male ===
2016-2024: Years 10-12
2025-present: Years 11/12

Season	Premiers	Runners-Up	Third Place	Fourth Place	Grand Final BoG
2016	Palm Beach Currumbin SHS	Helensvale SHS	Mountain Creek SHS	St Augustine's College	Brayden Crossley (Palm Beach Currumbin)
2017	Palm Beach Currumbin SHS	Helensvale SHS	Narangba Valley SHS	Ignatius Park College	Jake Burrows (Palm Beach Currumbin)
2018	Palm Beach Currumbin SHS	Helensvale SHS	Cairns SHS	St Laurence's College	Ashton Crossley (Palm Beach Currumbin)
2019	Helensvale SHS	Palm Beach Currumbin SHS	St Augustine's College	Mountain Creek SHS	Shaye Walsh (Helensvale)
2020	Palm Beach Currumbin SHS	Helensvale SHS	Mountain Creek SHS	Narangba Valley SHS	Will Bella (Palm Beach Currumbin)
2021	Helensvale SHS	Palm Beach Currumbin SHS	St Laurence's College	St Augustine's College	Finn Brown (Helensvale)
2022	Palm Beach Currumbin SHS	Helensvale SHS	St Augustine's College	Nudgee College	Jed Walter (Palm Beach Currumbin)
2023	Palm Beach Currumbin SHS	St Laurence's College	All Saints Anglican School	St Augustine's College	Will Graham (Palm Beach Currumbin)
2024	Palm Beach Currumbin SHS	St Laurence's College	Padua College	St Augustine's College	Jai Murray (Palm Beach Currumbin)
2025	St Laurence's College	Palm Beach Currumbin SHS	Iona College	St Augustine's College	Ben Morrison (St Laurence's College)
2026	St Laurence's College	St Augustine's College	Palm Beach Currumbin SHS	Helensvale SHS	AJ Pickering (St Laurence's College)

==== Titles ====
No.	School	Location	Titles	Runners-up
1	Palm Beach Currumbin SHS	Gold Coast	2016, 2017, 2018, 2020, 2022, 2023, 2024 (7)	2019, 2021, 2025 (3)
2	Helensvale SHS	Gold Coast	2019, 2021 (2)	2016, 2017, 2018, 2020, 2022 (5)
3	St Laurence's College	Brisbane	2025, 2026 (2)	2023, 2024 (2)
4	St Augustine's College	Cairns		2026 (1)

=== Senior Female ===
2016-2024: Years 10-12
2025-present: Years 11/12

Season	Premiers	Runners-Up	Third Place	Fourth Place	Grand Final BoG
2016	Mountain Creek SHS	The Cathedral College	Kedron SHS	Lindisfarne Anglican Grammar	Jessica Bender (Mountain Creek SHS)
2017	The Cathedral College	Mountain Creek SHS	Lourdes Hill College	Narangba Valley SHS	Jane Childs (The Cathedral College)
2018	Miami SHS	Fairholme College	Southport SHS	The Cathedral College	Lucy Single (Miami)
2019	Miami SHS	Palm Beach Currumbin SHS	Narangba Valley SHS	The Cathedral College	Teagan Levi (Miami)
2020	Palm Beach Currumbin SHS	Mountain Creek SHS	Park Ridge SHS	Narangba Valley SHS	Faith Alchin (Palm Beach Currumbin)
2021	Palm Beach Currumbin SHS	Varsity College	Kedron SHS	St Andrews Catholic College	Caitlin Thorne (Palm Beach Currumbin)
2022	Varsity College	Palm Beach Currumbin SHS	Mountain Creek SHS	St Andrews Catholic College	Havana Harris (Varsity College)
2023	Palm Beach Currumbin SHS	Varsity College	The Cathedral College	Marymount College	Alannah Welsh (Palm Beach Currumbin)
2024	Palm Beach Currumbin SHS	Varsity College	St Teresa's Catholic College	The Cathedral College	Mia Salisbury (Palm Beach Currumbin)
2025	St Peters Lutheran College	Palm Beach Currumbin SHS	Helensvale SHS	Trinity Bay SHS	Stella Scott (St Peters Lutheran College)
2026	Palm Beach Currumbin SHS	Mountain Creek SHS	Trinity Bay SHS	St Peters Lutheran College	Summer Browning (Palm Beach Currumbin SHS)

==== Titles ====
No.	School	Location	Titles	Runners-up
1	Palm Beach Currumbin SHS	Gold Coast	2020, 2021, 2023, 2024, 2026 (5)	2019, 2022, 2025 (3)
2	Miami SHS	Gold Coast	2018, 2019 (2)	
3	Varsity College	Gold Coast	2022 (1)	2021, 2023, 2024 (3)
3	Mountain Creek SHS	Sunshine Coast	2016 (1)	2017, 2020, 2026 (3)
5	The Cathedral College	Rockhampton	2017 (1)	2016 (1)
6	St Peters Lutheran College	Brisbane	2025 (1)	
7	Fairholme College	Toowoomba		2018 (1)

=== Youth Male ===
2025-present: Years 9/10

Season	Premiers	Runners-Up	Third Place	Fourth Place
2025	St Laurence's College	Varsity College	Brisbane South SSC	Ignatius Park College
2026	Palm Beach Currumbin SHS	All Saints Anglican School	Southport SHS	St Augustine's College

==== Titles ====
No.	School	Location	Titles	Runners-up
1	St Laurence's College	Brisbane	2025 (1)	
1	Palm Beach Currumbin SHS	Gold Coast	2026 (1)	
3	Varsity College	Gold Coast		2025 (1)
3	All Saints Anglican School	Gold Coast		2026 (1)

=== Youth Female ===
2025-present: Years 9/10

Season	Premiers	Runners-Up	Third Place	Fourth Place
2025	Palm Beach Currumbin SHS	Varsity College	Mountain Creek SHS	St Monica's College
2026	Palm Beach Currumbin SHS	Helensvale SHS	Brisbane South SSC	St Monica's College

==== Titles ====
No.	School	Location	Titles	Runners-up
1	Palm Beach Currumbin SHS	Gold Coast	2025, 2026 (2)	
2	Varsity College	Gold Coast		2025 (1)
2	Helensvale SHS	Gold Coast		2026 (1)

=== Junior Male ===
2016-2024: Years 7-9
2025-present: Years 7/8

Season	Premiers	Runners-Up	Third Place	Fourth Place
2016	Helensvale SHS	Palm Beach Currumbin SHS	Cairns SHS	Iona College
2017	Helensvale SHS	Palm Beach Currumbin SHS	Ignatius Park College	St Laurence's College
2018	Helensvale SHS	Narangba Valley SHS	Mountain Creek SHS	St Teresa's College Abergowrie
2019	Palm Beach Currumbin SHS	St Augustine's College	Helensvale SHS	Mountain Creek SHS
2020	Palm Beach Currumbin SHS	Helensvale SHS	Mountain Creek SHS	Varsity College
2021	Palm Beach Currumbin SHS	Ambrose Treacy College	Padua College	St Augustine's College
2022	Palm Beach Currumbin SHS	St Laurence's College	Padua College	St Brendan's College
2023	Palm Beach Currumbin SHS	St Laurence's College	Helensvale SHS	St Augustine's College
2024	Palm Beach Currumbin SHS	Brisbane South SSC	Padua College	Trinity Bay SHS
2025	Palm Beach Currumbin SHS	St Laurence's College	Helensvale SHS	Kirwan SHS
2026	Palm Beach Currumbin SHS	St Laurence's College	Helensvale SHS	Ignatius Park College

==== Titles ====
No.	School	Location	Titles	Runners-up
1	Palm Beach Currumbin SHS	Gold Coast	2019, 2020, 2021, 2022, 2023, 2024, 2025, 2026 (8)	2016, 2017 (2)
2	Helensvale SHS	Gold Coast	2016, 2017, 2018 (3)	2020 (1)
3	St Laurence's College	Brisbane		2022, 2023, 2025, 2026 (4)
4	Ambrose Treacy College	Brisbane		2021 (1)
4	Brisbane South SSC	Brisbane		2024 (1)
4	Narangba Valley SHS	Moreton Bay		2018 (1)
4	St Augustine's College	Cairns		2019 (1)

=== Junior Female ===
2016-2024: Years 7-9
2025-present: Years 7/8

Season	Premiers	Runners-Up	Third Place	Fourth Place
2016	Miami SHS	Narangba Valley SHS	St Monica's College	Hillbrook Anglican School
2017	Park Ridge SHS	Narangba Valley SHS	St. Teresa's Catholic College	Mercy College
2018	Park Ridge SHS	Cleveland District SHS	Kedron SHS	Mercy College
2019	Palm Beach Currumbin SHS	Varsity College	Kedron SHS	Ryan Catholic College
2020	Palm Beach Currumbin SHS	Varsity College	Pacific Pines SHS	Woodcrest SC
2021	Palm Beach Currumbin SHS	Varsity College	Marymount College	The Cathedral College
2022	Palm Beach Currumbin SHS	Hillcrest Christian College	The Cathedral College	Pacific Pines SHS
2023	Palm Beach Currumbin SHS	Varsity College	Helensvale SHS	St Andrews Catholic College
2024	Palm Beach Currumbin SHS	Varsity College	Marymount College	St Margaret Mary's College
2025	Palm Beach Currumbin SHS	Helensvale SHS	St Margaret Mary's College	Brisbane South SSC
2026	Palm Beach Currumbin SHS	All Saints Anglican School	Mountain Creek SHS	Ryan Catholic College

==== Titles ====
No.	School	Location	Titles	Runners-up
1	Palm Beach Currumbin SHS	Gold Coast	2019, 2020, 2021, 2022, 2023, 2024, 2025, 2026 (8)	
2	Park Ridge SHS	Logan	2017, 2018 (2)	
3	Miami SHS	Gold Coast	2016 (1)	
4	Varsity College	Gold Coast		2019, 2020, 2021, 2023, 2024 (5)
5	Narangba Valley SHS	Moreton Bay		2016, 2017 (2)
6	Cleveland District SHS	Redland City		2018 (1)
6	Hillcrest Christian College	Gold Coast		2022 (1)
6	Helensvale SHS	Gold Coast		2025 (1)
6	All Saints Anglican School	Gold Coast		2026 (1)

== North Queensland Championships ==
The North Queensland Championships are contested by the previous regional winners from Cairns, Capricornia, Mackay and Townsville for each division. The winners of these championships qualifies for the State Championships in Sunshine Coast.

=== North Queensland Champions ===
Season (Host)	Senior Male (Years 10-12)	Senior Female (Years 10-12)	Junior Male (Years 7-9)	Junior Female (Years 7-9)
2016 (Townsville)	St Augustine's College	The Cathedral College	Cairns SHS	St Monica's College
2017 (Mackay)	Ignatius Park College	The Cathedral College	Ignatius Park College	Mercy College
2018 (Townsville)	Cairns SHS	The Cathedral College	St Teresa's College Abergowrie	Mercy College
2019 (Mackay)	St Augustine's College	The Cathedral College	St Augustine's College	Ryan Catholic College
2020	Season not contested due to COVID-19 pandemic in Queensland			
2021 (Townsville)	St Augustine's College	St Andrews Catholic College	St Augustine's College	The Cathedral College
2022 (Townsville)	St Augustine's College	St Andrews Catholic College	St Brendan's College	The Cathedral College
2023 (Mackay)	St Augustine's College	The Cathedral College	St Augustine's College	St Andrews Catholic College
2024 (Townsville)	St Augustine's College	The Cathedral College	Trinity Bay SHS	St Margaret Mary's College

Season (Host)	Senior Male (Years 11/12)	Senior Female (Years 11/12)	Youth Male (Years 9/10)	Youth Female (Years 9/10)	Junior Male (Years 7/8)	Junior Female (Years 7/8)
2025 (Townsville)	St Augustine's College	Trinity Bay SHS	Ignatius Park College	St Monica's College	Kirwan SHS	St Margaret Mary's College
2026 (Townsville)	St Augustine's College	Trinity Bay SHS	St Augustine's College	St Monica's College	Ignatius Park College	Ryan Catholic College

== Former Competitions ==
=== Schools of Excellence Cup ===
The AFLQ Schools of Excellence (SoE) was the premier interschool competition for secondary schools in South East Queensland. It consisted of a home & away round robin as well as finals. With the introduction of the Schools Cup, while the SoE structure is still in place for game development, this series concludes with the succeeding participants qualifying for the larger state-wide competition. The Junior Premiers of each year will go onto the Northern States Cup to play against the winners of other state-wide interschool competitions. The Brisbane Lions Cup was the state competition for Youth Girls.

==== Premiers ====
Season	Senior Male	Junior Male
2009	Helensvale SHS	Helensvale SHS
2010	Helensvale SHS	Palm Beach Currumbin SHS
2011	Helensvale SHS	Palm Beach Currumbin SHS
2012	Helensvale SHS	Palm Beach Currumbin SHS
2013	Palm Beach Currumbin SHS	Palm Beach Currumbin SHS
2014	Palm Beach Currumbin SHS	Helensvale SHS
2015	Palm Beach Currumbin SHS	Helensvale SHS

=== Brisbane Lions Youth Girls Cup ===
The Brisbane Lions Cup was the premier state competition for Youth Girls. It was introduced in 2005 as a means of developing players that are new to the game. In 2015, a Schools of Excellence division was created, later being absorbed into the current AFLQ Schools Cup from 2016 onwards.

==== Premiers ====
Season	Senior Female	Junior Female
2005	Narangba Valley SHS	Narangba Valley SHS
2006	Narangba Valley SHS	Narangba Valley SHS
2007	Kedron SHS	Narangba Valley SHS
2008	Kedron SHS	Park Ridge SHS
2009	Kedron SHS	Centenary SHS
2010	Mountain Creek SHS	Mountain Creek SHS
2011	St Ursula's College	Kedron SHS
2012	Mountain Creek SHS	Mountain Creek SHS
2013	Mountain Creek SHS	Park Ridge SHS
2014	Mountain Creek SHS	Mountain Creek SHS
2015	Mountain Creek SHS	

== See also ==
- AFL Queensland
- Queensland Australian Football League
- NRL Schoolboy Cup
