= Connor Budarick =

Australian rules footballer

Personal information
- Full name: Connor Budarick
- Born: 6 April 2001 (age 25)
- Original team: Labrador (QAFL)/Gold Coast Suns (NEAFL)/Gold Coast Suns Academy
- Draft: No. 16, 2019 rookie draft
- Debut: Round 1, 2020, Gold Coast vs. Port Adelaide, at Carrara Stadium
- Height: 175 cm (5 ft 9 in)
- Weight: 75 kg (165 lb)
- Position: Forward

Club information
- Current club: Western Bulldogs
- Number: 19

Playing career^{1}
| Years | Club | Games (Goals) |
| 2020-2025 | Gold Coast | 55 (7) |
| 2026– | Western Bulldogs | 13 (1) |
- ^{1} Playing statistics correct to the end of round 22, 2026.

Career highlights
- AFL Rising Star nominee: 2020

Connor Budarick (born 6 April 2001) is an Australian rules footballer playing for the Western Bulldogs in the Australian Football League (AFL).

== Early life ==
Budarick was born in South Australia and spent the early years of his life in the small crayfishing town of Robe before relocating to Queensland's Gold Coast at the age of 9. His father, Craig, was a professional Australian rules footballer who initially played for Glenelg in the SANFL where he kicked 150 goals in 66 games and was drafted to the Sydney Swans with pick 110 in the 1989 national draft. Connor played his junior football for the Labrador Tigers and joined the Gold Coast Suns Academy at 12 years of age. He made his NEAFL debut for Southport at 16 years of age and became a regular selection for the Gold Coast Suns reserves team in 2018. In his teenage years, Budarick was given a scholarship to attend Helensvale State High School and partake in its AFL Sport of Excellence programme where he would go on to represent the school in the 2018 AFL Queensland State Championship Grand Final.

Leading into his 2019 junior season, Budarick was named captain of the Suns academy team and was awarded the Hunter Harrison Medal for the top performing academy player in the NAB League. He was then selected to represent the Allies at the 2019 AFL Under 18 Championships where his performances earned him All-Australian selection. Budarick was drafted to the Gold Coast Suns as an academy pre-listed player in October 2019. Budarick has stated he grew up supporting the Suns in his younger years.

== AFL career ==
Budarick made his AFL debut at 18 years of age against Port Adelaide in Round 1 of the 2020 AFL season. He was awarded the round 3 AFL Rising Star nomination for his brilliant defensive performance against the Adelaide Crows, which included 16 disposals, six marks and his first AFL goal.

On the 14th of October, 2025, Budarick was traded to the Western Bulldogs ahead of the 2026 season.

== Statistics ==
Updated to the end of round 22, 2026.

Legend
| G | Goals | K | Kicks | D | Disposals | T | Tackles |
| B | Behinds | H | Handballs | M | Marks |

| Season | Team | No. | Games | Totals | | | | | | | Averages (per game) | | | | | | | Votes |
| Season | Team | No. | Games | G | B | K | H | D | M | T | G | B | K | H | D | M | T | Votes |
|---|---|---|---|---|---|---|---|---|---|---|---|---|---|---|---|---|---|---|
| 2020 (Note: The 2020 season was played with 17 home-and-away matches per team (down from 22) and 16-minute quarters with time on (down from 20-minute quarters with time on) due to the impact of the COVID-19 pandemic.) | Gold Coast | 35 | 15 | 1 | 0 | 92 | 46 | 138 | 34 | 25 | 0.1 | 0.0 | 6.1 | 3.1 | 9.2 | 2.3 | 1.7 | 0 |
| 2021 | Gold Coast | 35 | 2 | 0 | 0 | 19 | 9 | 28 | 11 | 4 | 0.0 | 0.0 | 9.5 | 4.5 | 14.0 | 5.5 | 2.0 | 0 |
| 2022 | Gold Coast | 35 | 9 | 0 | 1 | 106 | 29 | 135 | 44 | 22 | 0.0 | 0.1 | 11.8 | 3.2 | 15.0 | 4.9 | 2.4 | 2 |
| 2023 | Gold Coast | 35 | 2 | 0 | 0 | 29 | 6 | 35 | 10 | 5 | 0.0 | 0.0 | 14.5 | 3.0 | 17.5 | 5.0 | 2.5 | 0 |
| 2024 | Gold Coast | 35 | 8 | 0 | 0 | 80 | 40 | 120 | 36 | 18 | 0.0 | 0.0 | 10.0 | 5.0 | 15.0 | 4.5 | 2.3 | 0 |
| 2025 | Gold Coast | 35 | 19 | 6 | 10 | 120 | 102 | 222 | 58 | 48 | 0.3 | 0.5 | 6.3 | 5.4 | 11.7 | 3.1 | 2.5 | 0 |
| 2026 | Western Bulldogs | 19 | 13 | 1 | 1 | 162 | 78 | 240 | 63 | 25 | 0.1 | 0.1 | 12.5 | 6.0 | 18.5 | 4.8 | 1.9 | 0 |
| Career | | | 68 | 8 | 12 | 608 | 310 | 918 | 256 | 147 | 0.1 | 0.2 | 8.9 | 4.6 | 13.5 | 3.8 | 2.2 | 2 |
