= Kenneth Wiltshire =

Kenneth William Wiltshire AO, known as Ken Wiltshire is an Australian academic and author. He is the J. D. Story Professor of Public Administration at the University of Queensland Business School. He was the Australian Representative on the Executive Board of UNESCO from 1999 to 2005 and a member of the Commonwealth Grants Commission. He is also a former student of Kedron State High School.

Wiltshire's main research interests encompass government-business relations, public sector management, governance, public policy, leadership, education and training, and comparative federalism. He has published a significant number of books, monographs, and articles in Australasia, Europe and North America.

Wiltshire has served as consultant to parliaments, governments, Royal Commissions and Inquiries, private business groups, and international bodies. He has served as Chairman of the Australian National Commission for UNESCO, Australian Heritage Commission, the World Heritage Wet Tropics Management Authority, Review of the Queensland School Curriculum, and Tertiary Entrance Procedures Authority, and recently completed a term as Special Adviser to the Australian National Training Authority.

Wiltshire is a National Fellow of the Institute of Public Administration Australia and is Honorary Trustee of Committee for Economic Development of Australia. In 1998 he was made an Officer of the Order of Australia for services to public administration, formulation of public policy, and UNESCO.

In 2010, following the federal election, Wiltshire wrote an opinion piece for The Australian newspaper where he quoted Edmund Burke. The piece called for the remaining independents to side with the Coalition. The piece has been criticized for its apparent intellectual dishonesty.
