= Ignatius Park College =

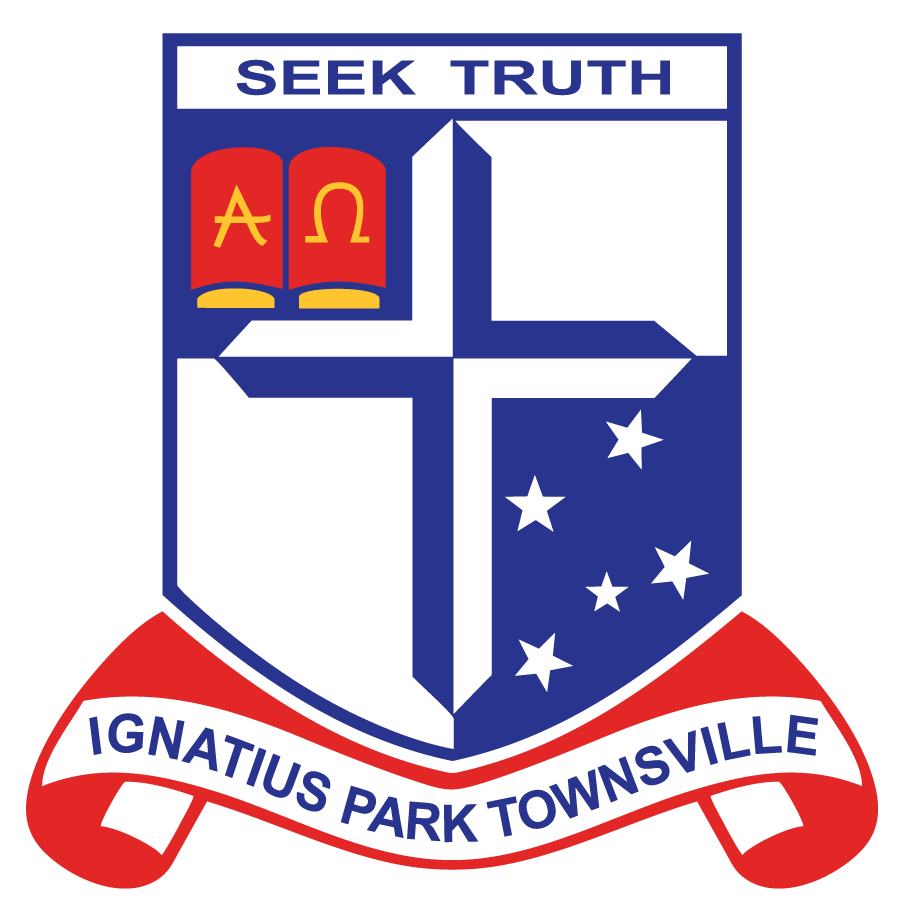

Location
- Cranbrook, Townsville, Queensland; Australia; 19°18′01″S 146°45′26″E

Information
- Type: affiliated secondary school
- Motto: Seek Truth
- Religious affiliation: Roman Catholicism
- Denomination: Congregation of Christian Brothers
- Established: 1969; 57 years ago
- Founder: Congregation of Christian Brothers
- Sister school: St Margaret Mary's College
- Trust: Edmund Rice Education Australia
- Principal: Luke Thompson
- Chaplain: Rod Ward
- Years offered: 7–12
- Gender: Boys
- Enrolment: c. 1000
- Website: www.ipc.qld.edu.au

Ignatius Park College, abbreviated to IPC and colloquially known as Iggy Park, is an independent Catholic secondary school for boys in Townsville, Queensland, Australia. The school is affiliated with the Edmund Rice Education Australia network that operates under the direction of the Congregation of Christian Brothers. The school was established in 1969 at its current location in Cranbrook, though it was built as a successor school to Our Lady's Mount, the former Catholic boys' secondary that was located in Stanton Hill. The college has a student population of ~1000 boys from Years 7 to 12.

== House system ==
Like many other Australian schools, Ignatius Park College is built upon a system of houses. At Ignatius Park there are seven houses. These are: Baillie House, Carew House, Nolan House, Putney House, Reid House, Rice House and Treacy House. Every house has six years levels 7–12 with each house having one class per year level. At the start only 5 houses were present however over the years more have been introduced with the latest being the Putney House in 2014.

Some Houses have other names, such as: The Putney Silverbacks, The Nolan Lions, The Treacy Tigers and The Baillie Bears. Each house has quirks and many unique aspects that make them different, along with what event each house performs better in.

=== Baillie House ===
The Baillie House was named after Br Leonard Loyal Baillie (1919–1984). The Baillie house colour is 'Blue' and their house motto is "Rip into It". Br Ballie was born in Mackay in 1919 and came from a large catholic family if eight boys. He spent three years as an apprentice tailor, before running away from home at 19 to go to Sydney to become a Christian Brother. Br Baillie began teaching in Balmain in 1944 and three years later was transferred to Our Lady's Mount on Stanton Hill in Townsville. After spending two years in Townsville, Br Baillie moved to Ingham to help establish Cardinal Gilroy Cllage but then returned as the 'Abbot' of St John Fisher, where he acted as both Principal and Superior of the community. Throughout the following years, Br Baillie taught in various locations including Brisbane and Papua New Guinea before retiring to Townsville. After battling some ill health, he passed away in 1984.

The ideals of the Baillie House are based on Br Baillie's spirit of developing and maintaining strong relationships, as well as understanding the importance of family, respecting others and working hard.

=== Carew House ===
The Carew House was named after Paddy Carew (1922–2002). The Carew House colour is 'Maroon', and their house motto is "Effort Every Time". The Carew House was founded in 2005 in the memory of Paddy Carew. Paddy Carew also has the Paddy Carew Shield which each year every house competes to win, the shield is the overall placements every house receives in every event along with academic achievement and behavior and effort students have in the classroom.

Paddy Carew was an Irishman and was a Golden Gloves Boxer in Ireland. Paddy left Dublin in 1944 to teach in London and migrated to Australia with his wife, Elieen in 1963 where they had five sons. Paddy started teaching at IPC in 1970, six months after the school opened and remained active at the school right up till his death in 2002. He is remembered as always looking out for the student who was battling (fighting) and was a much-loved member of the IPC community. He was a man of faith who appreciated sport, academia, family values, good times and, most of all people.

The objective of the Carew House is to follow the values and efforts of Paddy Carew and appreciate things and enjoy friendships. They believe that doing so will create an environment that Paddy and his family would be proud of.

=== Nolan House ===
The Nolan House was named after Br Patrick Wilfred Nolan (1877–1938). The Nolan house colour is 'Gold/Yellow' and their house motto is "Unleash the Fury".

Br Nolan was born in Ireland and worked some years before becoming a Christian Brother. he came to Australia in 1901 to teach in the first Christian Brother's School in Fremantle. It is remembered that Br Nolan was a careful and methodical teacher who was strict but kind and considerate. After ten years, he was appointed the first headmaster of Our Lady's Mount, Stanton Hill, Townsville.

He was later in charge of several schools in Queensland including St Laurence's, South Brisbane and Mount Carmel College, Charters Towers.

=== Putney House ===
The Putney House named after Sir Bishop Micheal Putney (1946–2014). Sir Bishop Micheal Putney blessed Ignatius Park College grounds on 16 March 1969. In 2014 the year of his passing the Putney house was created in his honour, not just as the first old boy of the Christian brothers in Townsville to be appointed as a catholic priest. the Putney House colour is 'Silver' with their house motto "Patience, Presence, Passion". Bishop Putney also has a road in Townsville named after him.

Bishop Putney was ordained a priest in 1969 and worked in parishes in the Archdiocese if Brisbane, before furthering his studies in Rome. Bishop Putney became an Auxiliary Bishop in Brisbane in 1995 and was appointed the bishop of the Townsville Diocese in 2001. Bishop Putney formed relationships with a wide range of people in Townsville and these relationships were an example to the IPC community of the power that can come from relationships based on trust and mutual respect.

The motto of the Putney House "Patience, Presence, Passion", stems from the personal qualities Sir Bishop Micheal Putney was renowned for.

=== Reid House ===
The Reid House was named after Br Douglas Herman Reid (1923–2000). The Reid house colour is 'Red' and their motto is "Do the little things well". The Reid House is one of the first five foundation houses in the IPC Pastoral system. Its namesake Br Douglas Herman Reid was born in South Townsville and was the first Principle of Ignatius Park College and an old boy of Our Lady's Mount. In addition to being he founding Principle, Br Reid was also a Superior and teacher of Senior Subjects. A hard-working and dedicated man, Douglas' determination to fulfill his role was inspirational.

The Reid House drew its spirit from Br Reid, emphasising participation and a holistic approach to life at Ignatius Park College. The successes of the House are attributed to this spirit of hard work and effort.

=== Rice House ===
The Rice House was named after Edmund Rice (1762–1844) who was the founder of the Christian Brothers. The Rice house colour is 'Green' and their house motto is "Have a Dig". The Rice House is named for the founder of the Congregation of Christian Brothers who established Ignatius Park College. The Rice house was one of the five foundational houses at IPC. All boys are supported and encouraged to do their best in all aspects of school life. Participating in classrooms, stage performance and sports. It is a point that result does not matter only effort. The ideals of the House are based on the 'old fashioned' values of being polite and well-mannered with a strong work ethic. Those in the Rice House have a responsibility like the rest of school to uphold the reputation of the college.

=== Treacy House ===
The Treacy House was named after Br Patrick Ambrose Treacy (1834–1912). The Treacy House colour is White and their motto is "Respect All, Fear None".

Br Patrick Treacy was the leader of a team of Brothers who came out to Australia from Ireland in 1868. Br Treacy joined the Brothers and taught first in Wexford, specializing in Mathematics and Navigation. As a Superior, he was appointed to lead the band of brothers who opened the Melbourne mission in 1868. In 1871, Br Treacy opened the Mother House of the Australian Foundation at Victoria Parade, Melbourne.

He opened the first brothers' school in Queensland, established first in Elizabeth Street, Brisbane and then moving to a site on Gregory Terrace, to become St Joseph's College. In 1876, Br Treacy established the brothers in Dunedin, New Zealand. Br Treacy died at St Joseph's Gregory Terrace in 1912 and is buried in the brothers' plot in Nudgee Cemetery. That the Brothers' Australian venture went on to be an outstanding success, is no small measure due to the untiring efforts if Brother Patrick Ambrose Treacy.

== Facilities ==
Ignatius Park College has over 40 pianos and 20 guitars, with the combined music room worth around $100,000. It has around ten computer labs for student use. The Edmund Rice Hall is used for assemblies, special events and community use. Ignatius Park is one of a handful of schools in Queensland with a 50-metre Olympic swimming pool.

Over the last years starting in 2024, Ignatius Park College has updated many classrooms, rebuilt state of the art science labs, rebuild the area known as the quad as well as plans to continue development. (09/06/2026)

=== Big Ben ===
Big Ben is a section of the college where smaller assemblies are held. Typically, one year level. It is a large open room with rows of chairs that are staggered upwards. The room is air conditioned, with a large projector, white board, sound system and a lectern including a microphone for any and all presentations. Additionally there is the rice house trophy cabinet with several awards and the banners listing the current seniors for each house.

=== Gym ===
Ignatius Park has a gym located in the John Fisher Building, available for senior training classes and is often used by many different people across grades when open for full school use during breaks. Containing many well-maintained exercise equipment, it has anything needed for proper exercise. The IPC sports teams use the area for training in the mornings and afternoons as well.

=== Pool ===
Ignatius Park college is one of a few schools that have a 50-meter-long swimming pool. There are diving pads on one side and a grandstand, benches and a smaller shaded area for viewing. It is used for swim classes, and the swimming carnival. Hire of the pool can be arranged by emailing the college . After decades of service the Pool is currently under renovation to fix tiling in 2026, completed by the end of term 4 of 2026.

=== Learning Resource Centre (LRC) ===
The Waterford Place Learning Resource Centre is the replacement to the old library. It opened in 2022 to the entire school, it boasts two stories with many rooms, and purposes. Contained within the LRC is Mount Sion is a large auditorium, two conference rooms, a green screen room, the IT department, the library, two printers, many areas for study, board games for student uses, a large deck outside and a small cafe area with a fridge and is also a space for Lego building. The LRC is also where the proud IPC Chess team plays their games with two electronic machines dedicated to chess, the LRC is tech free Monday to Thursday as of 2026.

Within the LRC is the IT department, where students can take their laptops to be repaired, have software installed, loan out laptops or chargers. It is a small room covered in equipment. The It personnel are responsible for the software and hardware around the college as well as the wifi, any watching programs and website bans.

More information can be found at Learning Resource Centre | Ignatius Park College.

=== The Edmund Rice Hall ===
The Edmund Rice Hall is fully air conditioned where full college assemblies are held along with multiple events. It is a large, very open, area with a stage at the front and two very large projectors, projecting onto banners for visible use. It has a full basketball court that can turn into a volleyball court as well. Entrances on all sides allow easy access in and out, as well into the two hall classrooms that overlook the area. Kitchen facilities include a cold room, dishwasher and service area. The kitchen is not licensed for food preparation. As such, all food must be prepared and provided by an external catering company. High-quality audiovisual facilities, including stereo sound and two large rear projection screens (4-metre wide) with projector.

The Hall is available to hire out, for information go to Edmund Rice Hall | Ignatius Park College.

=== Camp Gedling ===
Ignatius Park College is the owner of Camp Gelding, which was purchased in 1980 from the Gelding family. Since then, it has served as a community venue for educational, training and recreational activities.

Camp Gedling is set out of the Townsville region, located at Hervey Range approximately 35 km from Townsville on the Hervey Range Development Road, and is placed at a slightly higher altitude, meaning it is often much colder that the rest of the coastal area. Camp Gedling is not a highly developed area it is a basic camp site. However, it does have a kitchen with catering to be arranged by whomever is currently using it. A covered dining area, an activity hall, a land line telephone, electricity, hot water and septic toilets. The water availability on the property is directly dependent on seasonal rainfall, as such the regulated use of bore water and dam water are used for irrigation and washing, not suitable for drinking. The water collected by rainfall is strictly rationed and conserved as too not run out of water whilst people are occupying the space.

Camp Gedling is available for hire, for more information go to Camp Gedling | Ignatius Park College.

Additional facilities: A high ropes obstacle course, many open areas for general activities, Keelbottom Creek is nearby for easy access to water-based activities subject to seasonal flow in the creek, abseiling sites to be accessed with owner's permission, with many additional land-based activities see Camp Gedling | Ignatius Park College.

=== Science labs ===
Completed May 2025 the old Ignatius Park College science labs were demolished and rebuilt. After this rebuilding the science labs became the most developed and state of the art science labs in all of North Queensland. Every lab is equipped with ID sensors, projector screens, cameras for live demonstration, cabinets with basic equipment for practical lessons, lab safety equipment, bag storage and many storage facilities and connection to rooms filled with science equipment not safe to have in a normal classroom.

These rooms also redid the pavement in front of them to be a nicer and slightly wider surface for students to walk across with a high railing and decorative sun cover. The project cost IPC ~3 million Australian dollars to complete and was done in part of the renovation and future strategy of IPC leadership. Whilst the science labs were being rebuilt temporary labs were set up in the old library which after the LRC was constructed and after the science labs were rebuilt, as of mid-June 2026, is not in use.

=== Quadrangle ===
In the middle of the school is the quadrangle or the quad, which underwent renovations on 17 November 2024. It features turf, trees, umbrella shades in the 7 house colours, water mist fans to cool students during hot summers, tables and sandstone seating blocks, pathways, and power points. The renovations were met with strongly positive reactions from the school base. In the center of the new quad is the school logo, which student tradition is to avoid walking over. It is used to host events such as Iggy under the stars, open day, and showcases.

=== St John Fisher ===
In 1952 the St John Fisher building was established, with its primary focus being to alleviant the growing number of enrollments. However currently "John Fisher" is the home of the Putney House with lockers on the bottom floor being for Putney students, and the upstairs for Carew students. John Fisher is 2 stories tall having bubblers on each floor which is unique to John Fisher, stairs leading to the second floor on both sides with a connecting crosswalk and sky bridge to the rest of the school. John Fisher has many purposes, housing the gym and storing Physical Education equipment and offices for coaches. During Breaks handball courts and tables are available, and 8 rooms which are used during exams as its one of the quietest places on college grounds. John fisher also has the unique room codes 700. Furthermore, it's next to the swimming pools and an elevator for the physically handicap balconies facing the ovals and carpark and in room 708 a kitchen used when events are hosted nearby.

In 2026 The John Fisher Building underwent renovations transforming the rooms to match the earlier room renovations during 2024–2025. Now possessing smart screens, clean whiteboards, new desks and chairs. As well as fixing internal wiring and plumbing.

=== Football Feilds ===
Ignatius Park college has 3 ovals, oval 1 being next to John Fisher, oval 2 and 3 to the right. Every oval has 2 footy posts, however each oval has its own Feilding events. Oval 1 has an electronic score sign used during games, as well as the shotput area, the long jump area and the brothers' rugby league shed. Between ovals 1 and 2 is a gravel road leading to the back of the school where students are permitted to park their motor vehicles. There is an additional shed with change rooms and toilets next to this path. Oval 2 has two storage sheds, a metal cage in area for discus, the long jump course and is by the basketball courts and trade center. Oval 3 contains the javelin area and is known for being muddy. The footy fields are used during all practical physical education classes and are used during Eddie rice day and for other external sports events.

=== Front and Back of the School ===
At the front of the school is the Chapel where some small masses are held and is an additional meeting area similar to the use of Big Ben. It is a well-built room with a large tree beside it, the walls are glass and a simple lectern is in the center.

Behind the LRC is a walkable garden with small plaques to Christian figures, surrounded by trees and plants it is an empty section of the school grounds. As an add on the garden walkways is a statue of Edmund rice surrounded by bricks engraved with names of sponsors of that event. Close by helping to get to the back deck of the LRC is the captains walk a small brick path with the names of all former college captains.

In this garden is a Blue Tree, place in 2023 with renovations and repainting in 2026. With a gabion bench alongside to "start conversations and raise awareness for mental health and suicide awareness". With an additional entrance and exit, built for bus students due to a change in the location of the nearby bus stop.

The last part of the front of the school is the front offices with student reception, reception for parents, sick bay, toilets and head staff offices as well as the large board room including a small kitchen. There is a large sign and flags behind it. Away next to John Fisher, the pool and the LRC is the large carpark constructed along with the LRC to serve as the drop off and pick up zone and staff parking (students are to park behind the school).

Just a bit further is Student Hub, used for bus students arriving late, lost property which also has the cage, a small, unlocked room under some stairs or finding information, for example where your class is. Student hub also leads to the director of students, student well-being and the cultural coordinator office. There is also the Eddie Rice Office where the planning for student schedules and classes they have selected, changing subjects or other general information and planning.

At the back of the school is student parking stretching along the entire length of the fence, parking for students who bike to school, gates to enter and exit. Additionally, trees stretch the length of the fence. Nearby is Cranbrook Park where student walk over to during Eddie Rice day to compete in the school's cross-country event.

=== Mall ===
Next to Eddie Rice Hall is the mall, a concrete area with lines of tables for eating during breaks and multitudes of lockers on every wall. Connected with the bathrooms, and the Quad on the other side. The Mall has many extra areas. On one side is the tuck-shop where students can buy a range of foods changing daily, with pizza on Thursday. The Tuck-shop also has the Toast room, a charity in which students volunteer each morning, except Mondays, to make toast in vegemite, jam, cream cheese and honey. This is available for anyone to take and eat in the mornings. next to the toilet is the Red Doo or the identity and mission room, used for planning community events, charities, and what Ignatius Park Is doing next. Through a staircase above is the maintenance room, where tools, equipment and personnel are ready to fix anything around the college.

On the other side is the councilors office and phoenix room where students can go when they need some help or advice and is open to those with any handicap. Additionally, towards the middle is the careers hub where students go to plan work experience talk about your future, organize SET plan interviews, and outside of school programs like TAFE or JCU NOW, or what subjects you need to take for your career path. Next to the careers hub is the multicultural hub, for indigenous students and planning of traditional indigenous dance troupes. Outside the tuck-shop is the blue wall where students who have shown exceptional work, competing in state championships or outstanding academic achievement or community service. Lastly is the defense room just outside, where those with parents in the defense force meet to talk or eat when needed.

== Rugby league ==
Ignatius Park's rugby league program is offered from U/13s through to the First XIII with around 300 students involved in teams.

== Australian football achievements ==
The college competes in the AFL Queensland Schools Cup, the premier Australian rules football competition for schools in Queensland, it is run by AFL Queensland.

=== Senior male (years 10-12) ===
- North Queensland Championships

(gold) Champions: 2017

=== Junior male (Years 7-9) ===
- AFL Queensland Schools Cup

(bronze) Third Place: 2017

- North Queensland Championships

(gold) Champions: 2017

== Basketball team achievements ==
=== Championship men (open) ===
- Australian Schools Championships

(silver) Runners Up: 2015

== Notable alumni ==
- Tom Chester – professional rugby league player for the North Queensland Cowboys
- Jason Clarke – actor, known for his work in Terminator Genisys and Dawn of the Planet of the Apes
- Kyle Feldt – professional rugby league player for St Helens R.F.C. and all-time leading tryscorer in the history of the North Queensland Cowboys
- Aidan Guerra – professional rugby league player for the Sydney Roosters
- Coen Hess – professional rugby league player for the North Queensland Cowboys and the Queensland Maroons
- Valentine Holmes – professional rugby league player for the Cronulla-Sutherland Sharks and the Queensland Maroons
- Corey Jensen – professional rugby league player for the Brisbane Broncos
- Patrick Kaufusi – professional rugby league player for the North Queensland Cowboys
- Joe Kelly – politician; Member for Greenslopes (Labor), Deputy Speaker of the Legislative Assembly
- Anthony Mitchell – professional rugby league player for the North Queensland Cowboys
- Michael Morgan – professional rugby league player for the North Queensland Cowboys and the Queensland Maroons
- Kayln Ponga – professional rugby league player for the Newcastle Knights and the Queensland Maroons
- Scott Prince – professional rugby league player for the Gold Coast Titans

== See also ==
- List of schools in Queensland
- Catholic education in Australia
