= St Andrews Catholic College =

St Andrew's Catholic College

Location
- 185–205 Redlynch Intake Rd, Redlynch QLD 4870; Cairns, Queensland; Australia; 16°54′23″S 145°41′59″E

Information
- Type: Systemic, co-educational, primary and secondary day school
- Motto: Latin: iter una (Journey together)
- Denomination: Roman Catholicism
- Patron saint: Saint Andrew
- Established: 2001; 25 years ago
- Founder: Lauretta Graham
- Principal: Ian Margetts
- Grades: Prep–Year 12
- Enrolment: 1,650 (2022)
- Colours: Teal, yellow and rust
- Website: www.standrewscc.qld.edu.au

St Andrew's Catholic College, (Often abbreviated to STACC) is an independent, Roman Catholic, co-educational, P-12 (However originally P-4) school, located in Redlynch, Cairns, Queensland, Australia. It is administered by the Queensland Catholic Education Commission, with an enrolment of 1,565 students and a teaching staff of 122, as of 2023. The school serves students from Prep through to Year 12.

== History ==
The school opened on 1 January 2001. In 2016, they updated their house group and school logo to its current version. In 2017, St Andrews was labeled a 'SunSmart School,' due to developing an action plan on sun safety.

It is part of the Northern Beaches Parish of Holy Cross.

== AFL Team Achievements ==
=== Senior Female (Years 10-12) ===
- North Queensland Championships

(gold) Champions: (2) 2021, 2022

=== Junior Female (Years 7-9) ===
- North Queensland Championships

(gold) Champions: 2023

== See also ==
- Catholic education in Australia
- Catholic Education Cairns
- List of schools in Far North Queensland
