= Miami State High School =

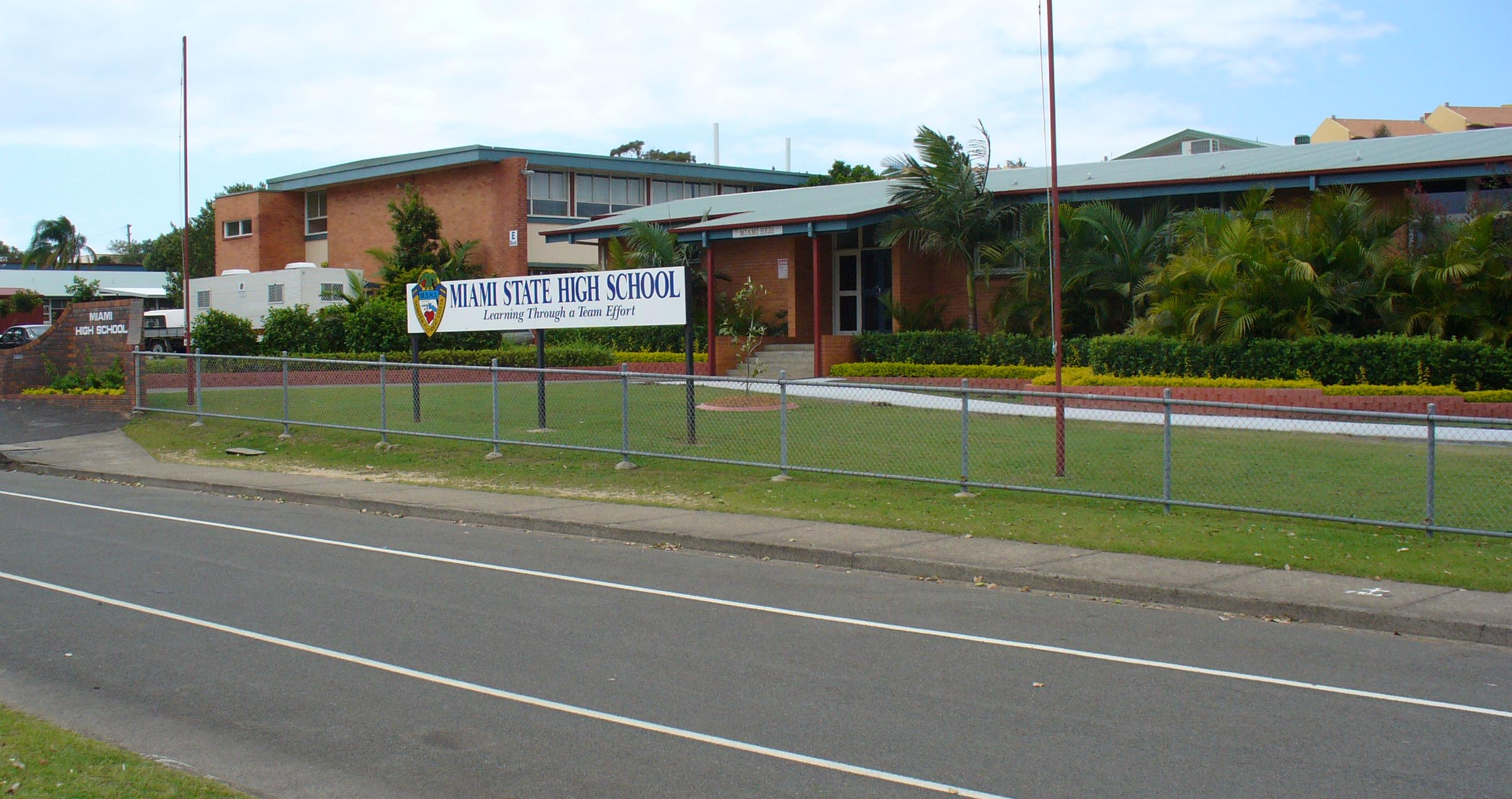
- Miami State High School's main entrance in 2016

Location
- 2137-2205 Gold Coast Highway; Miami, Gold Coast, Queensland, 4220; Australia; 28°3′47.04″S 153°26′19.83″E

Information
- Type: State secondary day school
- Motto: Latin: Semper floreat costa (May the coast always flourish)
- Religious affiliation: Non-denominational
- Established: 1963
- Authority: Department of Education (Queensland)
- Principal: Clint Curran
- Staff: 122 (Teaching); 61 (Non-Teaching)
- Year levels: Year 7 – Year 12 s
- Gender: Coeducational
- Enrolment: 1,542 students (August 2025)
- Capacity: 1,536
- Campus type: Major City
- Colours: Yellow; Blue; White
- Slogan: First Class Location, World Class Education
- Website: miamishs.eq.edu.au

Miami State High School is a secondary school in the suburb of Miami in the City of Gold Coast, Queensland, Australia. It is currently the Gold Coast's second oldest state school, second in age only to Southport State High School (established 1955).

The traditional custodians of the land on which Miami State High School rests are the Yugambeh language group of the Bundjalung nation.

Originally named South Coast District State High School, Miami High was officially opened in April 1963. It soon became known as Miami High and, after a number of years, the more compact name was officially adopted. It was built to meet the needs of the rapidly expanding population on the Gold Coast. At the time, the only public high schools were Southport High School and Tweed River High School, about 35 kilometres (22 mi) apart, with the site of Miami High about midway between the two on the Gold Coast Highway at the very northern end of Miami.

== Infrastructure ==
=== Initial Construction ===
The chosen site presented a number of construction challenges because the southern half was a swamp and the northern half was on the steep slope of Nobby's Headland, an upthrust of schist about 50 m high at its highest point. The challenges were met by the simple expedient of blasting the slope and dumping the rubble in the swamp, but with a consequent complete loss of topsoil that created enduring problems for many years.

It construction in the sixties always stayed behind the needs of the students for three reasons:

(a) competition with established schools for resources;
(b) the transition of the Baby Boom Generation from primary school to high school; and
(c) the inclusion of year 8.

1965 and 1966 saw open underschool areas, originally intended for protection from sun and rain, being converted to temporary classrooms and several flimsy demountable buildings being installed as other temporary classrooms.Despite their nominally temporary nature, many of these structures were still in use twenty years later.

=== Buildings ===
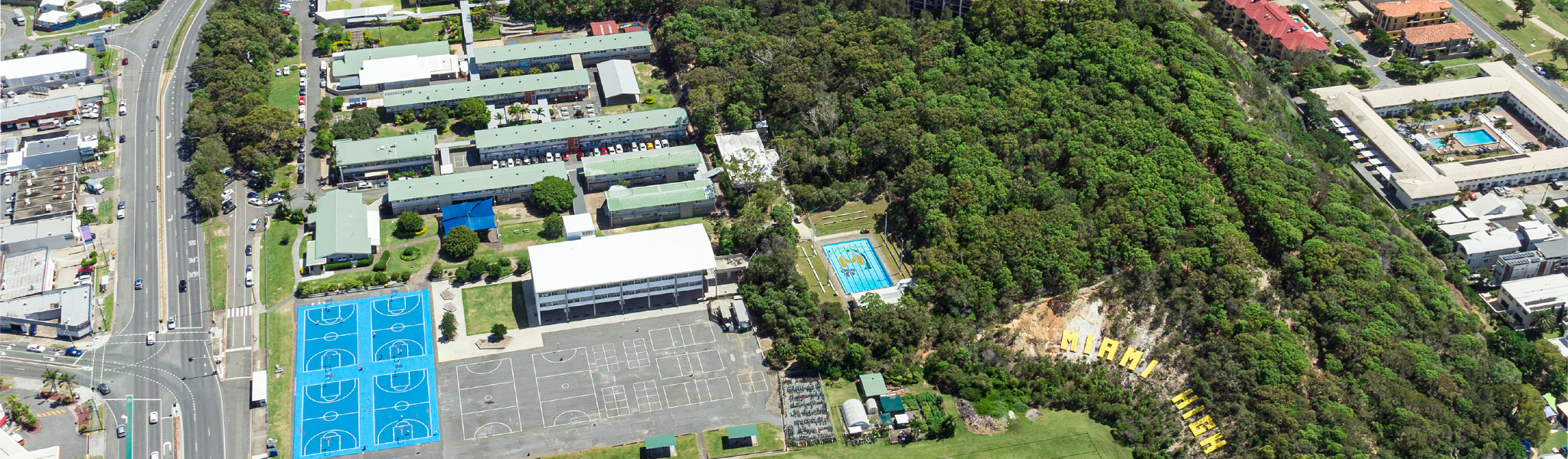
Aerial view of Miami State High School in 2020.

The school has an assembly hall with a 1,500 seat capacity. This assembly hall was the first venue on the coast that could seat more than 1,000 people. It has hosted performers such as AC/DC, Sherbet, Skyhooks, and Hot Chocolate.

In 1967, the Australian federal government built a two-story, four-laboratory science block, as part of a program to improve the teaching of science throughout Australia. Several of the laboratories were promptly pressed into service as regular classrooms.

In 2014, construction of a multi-storey learning facility for years 7 and 8 was completed, as part of the "Flying Start" program, which brought year 7 students into the Queensland high school system. The building has two prominent brick murals composed of brickwork in a standard grey mortar with recessed joints, dually functioning as cladding and a piece of artwork. The northern elevation has a brick mural depicting a breaking wave. The pattern is said to be a surfing metaphor for "the need to focus on the task at hand from start to finish and achieve the best outcome for you.", similar to the principles of surfing a tube which requires "a good start, stay calm and composed in the middle, before ending the journey in one piece, albeit a changed and inspired person." The western elevation, facing the highway, has a "binary wall" mural, featuring a binary computer code spelling out the school's slogan and motto, "Miami State High School, Learning through a team effort, Semper Costa Floreat". The architect, Conrad Garget, described it as "a cost effective, artistic, inspiring, character enabling, durable and low maintenance structure which both describes the story of development in education through the use of computers."

The building prompted the then school principal, Jim Baker, to have the word 'Inspire' rise vertically on the western elevation of the entry building, and, subsequently, to similarly name all the school's existing buildings.

=== Sports ===
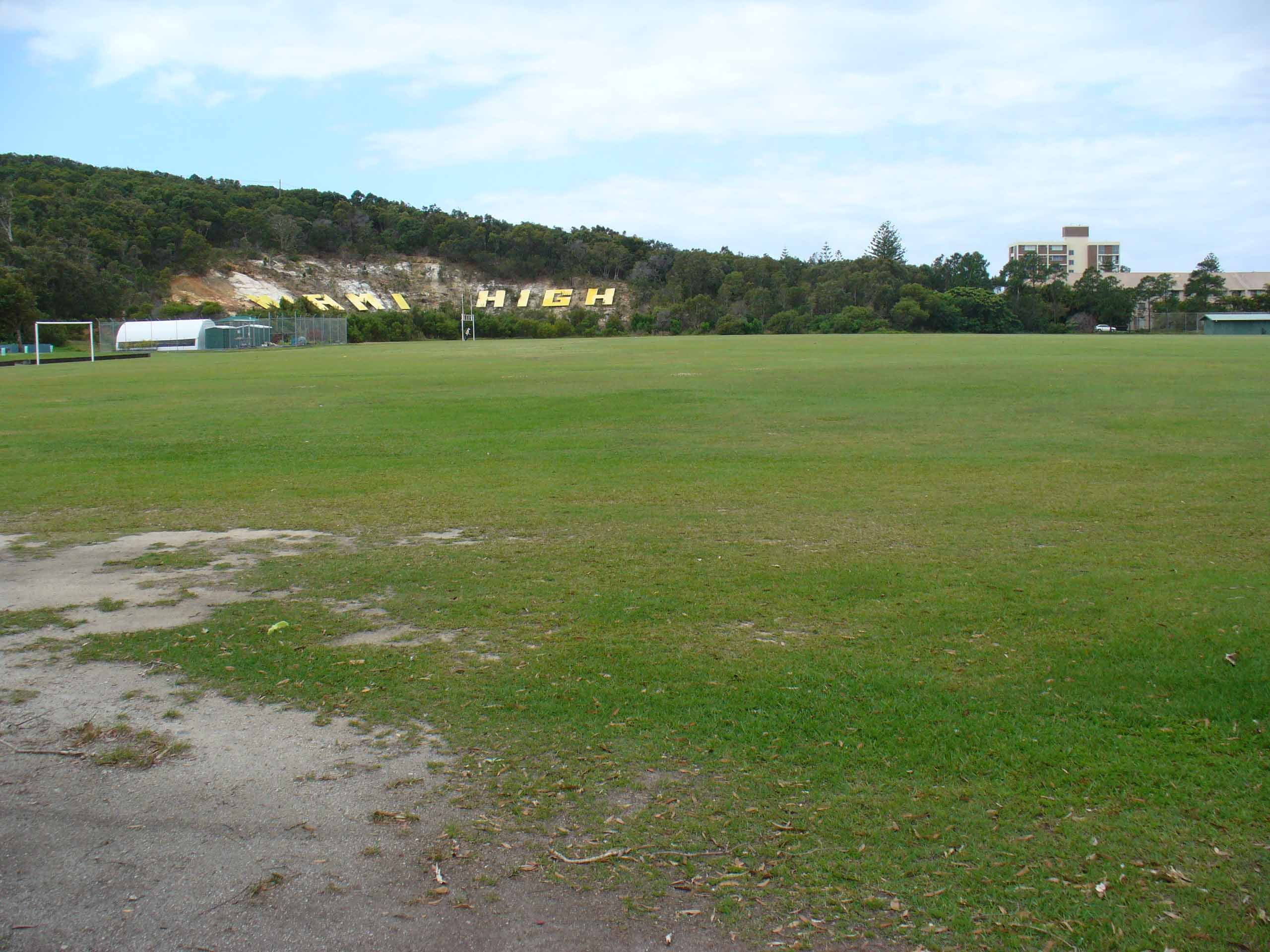
Miami High School's playing field in 2016

Miami State High School possesses an all-weather playing surface featuring four basketball, four netball and three volleyball courts, a sports field, fully equipped gymnasium and 25 metre swimming pool.

In January 2024, The Sports Centre of Excellence was officially finished and open for school and approved community usage. Students can utilise the building's world class sports facilities to develop their athletic abilities and excel in their chosen sports.

The new hall features two sports courts, a kinesiology lab and theory room, three learning areas and a staff room. There are also additional amenities and equipment storage, office space, a performance stage, and a kitchen with kiosk facilities.

A total of $13.2 million (including GST) was invested to deliver the new multi-purpose hall.

==== AFL Team Achievements ====
===== Senior Female (Years 10-12) =====
- AFL Queensland Schools Cup

(gold) Champions: (2) 2018, 2019

===== Junior Female (Years 7-9) =====
- AFL Queensland Schools Cup

(gold) Champions: 2016

=== Hollywood Sign ===
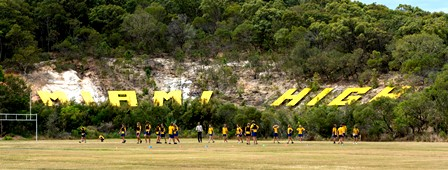
The "Miami High" sign in 2015.

Miami's most iconic landmark is the school's yellow ‘Hollywood-style’ sign. Exerect in 1979, the sign was the brainchild of then principal, William Callinan, and was designed to cover the scarp face, once the site of a rock quarry. After a trip to Los Angeles, Bill was inspired by the Hollywood sign to build the school's sign in the same design. Originally, it read 'Hi Miami High', but it now reads simply "Miami High". The school's sign on the side of the hill is listed on the Gold Coast Local Heritage Register, due to it being "historically significant in demonstrating the important fun and fantasy phase of development on the Gold Coast.".

=== Fencing ===
The school grounds are enclosed in a 2-metre tall spiked black steel perimeter fence. The fence was constructed in 2022, as part of a state government initial which saw similar fence erected in 140 school in 2021. The reason for the fence was attributed to the general "rise in crime around state schools in south-east Queensland".

== Curriculum ==
=== Exchange Academy ===
Miami State High School offers a number of Excellence and Specialisation programs for high achieving and goal driven students in the following fields: Academic, Cultural and Sporting.

=== Exchange Program ===
Miami High has introduced an international exchange program with students from all over the world now attending the school.

=== Aviation ===
Since 2025, they canceled the courses.

=== Languages ===
The school's language department offers Japanese, Spanish, and Auslan (Australian Sign Language).

As part of it extra-curicullar program it organises international trips to Japan and Spain.

== Administration ==
=== Staff ===
As of 2025, the school has a teaching staff of 122 (Full-Tine Equivalent: 114.7) and a non-teaching staff of 61 (Full-Time Equivalent: 46.0).

=== Principals ===
The following is a full list of the school's principals since the schools inception:

Previous principals
Tenure	Name	Ref
1963–1966	Claude Rayner	
1967–1968	John Rowe	
1969–1985	William "Bill" Callinan	
1986–2016	Jim Baker	
2017–2023	Susan Dalton	
2024–Present	Clint Curran	

In 2025, the current principal of Miami State High School was Clint Curran and the deputy principal is Michelle Flynn.

== Students ==
=== Years ===
In 1964, Queensland's primary schools ceased to teach year 8, which was transferred to the high schools. The "infant" Miami State High School went from catering to year 9 to catering to years 8–10, causing the school to be barely being able to provide enough classrooms for the start of the year.

As part of a 2013 trial, officially implemented in 2015, year 7 was subsequently included, so that Miami State High School now catered for years 7–12, to align Queensland with the other states, as part of Anna Bligh's state-wide "Flying Start" program.

=== Student enrolments ===
In 2026, Miami State High School was reported to have a maximum student enrolment capacity of 1,536 students.

The trend in school enrolments (August figures) has been:

Trends in Student Enrolments
Year	Years						Boys	Girls	Total	Capacity	Ref
Year	7	8	9	10	11	12	Boys	Girls	Total	Capacity	Ref
2014	-	-	-	-	-	-	560	586	1,146	-	
2015	-	-	-	-	-	-	627	644	1,271	-	
2016	-	-	-	-	-	-	621	625	1,246	-	
2017	-	-	-	-	-	-	596	620	1,216	-	
2018	-	-	-	-	-	-	620	635	1,255	-	
2019	253	253	199	224	231	163	656	666	1,322	1,128	
2020	270	253	248	197	198	166	659	673	1,332	1,128	
2021	313	268	264	247	178	190	728	732	1,460	1,128	
2022	302	309	261	259	252	157	754	786	1,540	1,449	
2023	256	297	314	248	238	202	764	791	1,555	1,449	
2024	265	248	296	298	248	186	737	804	1,541	1,449	
2025	TBA	TBA	TBA	TBA	TBA	TBA	736	806	1,542	1,449	
2026	TBA	TBA	TBA	TBA	TBA	TBA	TBA	TBA	TBA	1,536	

== Cultural Diversity ==
=== Indigenous ===
The school is located on Kombumerri Saltwater People people's traditional Country, part of the broader Yugambeh nation.

=== Multiculturalism ===
The recent trends in multicultural composition been:

Trends in Multicultural Composition
Year	Indigenous	LBOTE	Ref
2014	4%	12%	
2015	4%	8%	
2016	3%	13%	
2017	3%	13%	
2018	3%	15%	
2019	3%	15%	
2020	3%	12%	
2021	3%	12%	
2022	3%	11%	
2023	3%	12%	
2024	3%	11%	
2025	4%	16%	
2026	TBA	TBA	

== Notable alumni ==
The following are notable alumni of the school:

Notable alumni in Politics & Business
Name	Achievement	Ref
Anna Bligh	Former Premier of Queensland	
Richard Black	Former Chief Technology Officer, Bank of England	

Notable alumni in the Entertainment Industry
Name	Achievement	Ref
Amanda Ware	Australia's Next Top Model (Cycle 6) Winner	
Kim Watkins	TV Presenter	

Notable alumni in sport
Name	Sport	Top-level team/affiliation	Ref
Maddison Levi	Australian rules football Rugby sevens	Gold Coast; Australia	
Teagan Levi	Australian rules football Rugby sevens	Gold Coast; Australia	
Lucy Single	Australian rules football	Gold Coast	
Scott McGrory	Cycling	Australia	
Heidi Piper	Fencing	Notre Dame	
Sharon Jaklofsky	Long jump	Netherlands	
Alex Glenn	Rugby league	Brisbane, New Zealand	
Wayne 'Rabbit' Bartholomew	Surfing	Australia	
Benjamin Schulte	Swimming	Part of the contingent for Guam at the 2012 Summer Olympics (London).	

== See also ==
- Education in Queensland
- History of state education in Queensland
- List of schools in Gold Coast, Queensland
- List of schools in Queensland
- Lists of schools in Australia
