= Narangba Valley State High School =

Location
- Narangba, Queensland; Australia; 27.1734°S 152.9419°E

Information
- Type: Public
- Motto: Challenging the Future
- Established: 2000
- Principal: Kyrra Mickelborough
- Enrolment: Approximately 2200 (2017)
- Campus: Suburban (Narangba)
- Colours: Navy blue, green and gold
- Website: narangbavalleyshs.eq.edu.au/

Narangba Valley State High School (NVSHS) is a co-educational, state secondary school in Narangba, Queensland. It is one of the newest schools in the state, having only opened on 1 January 2000.

== Principals ==
- Ken Kennedy (2000–2002)
- Ross Mackay (2002– 1 August 2014)
- Adam Colley (1 August 2014 – 2015) (5 March 2018 – 16 July 2018)
- Steven Miskin (16 July 2018 – 15 December 2021)
- Kyrra Mickelborough (15 December 2021 – present)

== Academics ==
Narangba Valley State High School offers schooling from grade 7 (Grade 8 before 2015) through to 12. The school has had a reasonable amount of academic success, with 71% of students receiving an OP of 1–15 in 2006, one of the highest scores for state schools in the district.

Subjects are offered in a wide range of curriculum areas: Mathematics, English, SOSE, Science, Performing Arts, Life Technology (Home Economics), Design Technology (Manual Arts), ICT and Business, Physical Education, LOTE (Japanese and Spanish) and Visual Arts.

As well as these Academic subjects, the school also has a weekly lesson designed to enhance the life skills of the students, known as SGD (Student Growth and Development). Another of these weekly lessons is VAP (Access to Vocational Pathways). In VAP, Year 10 students have been completing a Certificate II in Work and Vocation Pathways, with an embedded numeracy and literacy short course, adding 7 points towards their Queensland Certificate of Education. In Years 11 and 12, students complete preparation tests for the Queensland Core Skills Test.

== Academy programs ==
Since 2004 the school has offered extension programs in many subjects. Students are given the opportunity to nominate or be selected for the fast-tracked subjects in Year 8. These programs are offered in a number of different areas. They offer the SMA (Science and Maths Academy) for the more academically excelling students, a music academy, and an AFL and netball are being offered as well.

=== Core subjects ===
Students who achieve outstanding academic results are selected to take part in these programs. The programs are offered until Year 11, when students are given the opportunity to undertake further courses during their senior years.

Academies are offered in Mathematics, English, Science and SOSE.

=== Performing arts ===
At the beginning of Year 7, students are asked to audition for either of the three academies: Music, Dance and/or Drama. These students complete work faster than ordinary classes, and their assessment is expected to be of a higher standard. These academies continue until year 10, where students progress to complete their senior studies.

A recent addition to the academy program is Academy Camp and Tour. This involves Academy students preparing and rehearsing a performance, before traveling to a number of local schools and presenting the act.

==== The P.A.L.A.C.E. ====
The PALACE

Narangba Valley's Performing Arts and Lifestyle Academic Centre of Excellence is a state of the art hall, that was officially opened in 2005. The facility includes:

- 1500 seat indoor auditorium
- Two full-size basketball courts
- Six volleyball courts
- Dodgeball courts
- Two tennis courts
- Four badminton courts
- Two netball courts
- Two purpose built drama classrooms
- Sports gymnasium
- Lighting and sound studio
- All new stage lighting

=== Physical education ===
==== AFL Academy ====
The Narangba Valley AFL Academy has been successful in numerous endeavours. It was the first AFL academy in the state to have female participants. The grade 8 academy students won the statewide Fast Nines competition in 2005 and the Junior (grade 8 and 9) AFL team won the statewide Lion's Cup for 2006. This feat was also achieved by both the Junior and Senior girls teams in 2006. This great triumph was repeated in 2007 by the junior girls team. The boys' and girls' AFL teams have both completed a trip to Melbourne, in 2007 and 2008 respectively, to compete against local school teams. In 2010 the grade 8 girls won Fast Nines.

==== Australian Football Achievements ====
The college competes in the AFL Queensland Schools Cup, the premier Australian Rules Football competition for schools in Queensland, it is run by AFL Queensland.

===== Senior Male (Years 10-12) =====
- AFL Queensland Schools Cup

(bronze) Third Place: 2017

===== Senior Female (Years 10-12) =====
- AFL Queensland Schools Cup

(bronze) Third Place: 2019

- Brisbane Lions State Cup

(gold) Champions: (2) 2005, 2006

===== Junior Male (Years 7-9) =====
- AFL Queensland Schools Cup

(silver) Runners Up: 2018

===== Junior Female (Years 7-9) =====
- AFL Queensland Schools Cup

(silver) Runners Up: 2016, 2017

- Brisbane Lions State Cup

(gold) Champions: (3) 2005, 2006 2007

== House system ==
Narangba Valley has five houses, one of which each student is a member of. Each house is named after an animal:

- KIRRAWA (yellow) – named after the goanna.
- BIDARA (orange) – named after the scorpion.
- MALOO (red) – named after the red-bellied black snake.
- GARAWI (blue) – named after the shark.
- ARINYA (green) – named after the kangaroo.

Over the course of each year, the different houses compete for a number of different championships and shields:

- Inter-House Swimming Carnival
- Inter-House Athletics Carnival
- Champion Sporting House
- Champion Service House
- Champion Cultural House
- Champion Academic House

Prior to 2018, four houses were used, named after Australian sportspeople. These were:

- FREEMAN (yellow) – named after runner Cathy Freeman
- LAVER (red) – named after tennis player Rod Laver
- O'NEILL (blue) – named after swimmer Susie O'Neill
- RAFTER (green) – named after tennis player Patrick Rafter

== Extracurricular activities ==
The school's instrumental music program involves a large number of students. The school has a number of different ensembles, which perform at many events, as well as competitions including the Queensland Youth Music Awards.

Each year, numerous teams are entered into the QDU Debating Competition. Narangba Valley's teams have had reasonable success in recent years, with a number teams progressing into the finals competition.

In every other year, the school produces a musical, which contains a large number of students from the performing arts faculty. The following musicals have been produced:

- 2004 – Grease
- 2006 – Little Shop of Horrors
- 2008 – The Wiz
- 2010 – Beauty and the Beast
- 2013 – Bugsy Malone
- 2015 – High School Musical
- 2017 — Camp Rock
- 2019 – Wicked
- 2023 – Grease
- 2025 – Charlie and the Chocolate Factory

== See also ==
- Education in Australia
- List of schools in Queensland
