= St Augustine's College, Cairns =

Saint Augustine's College, Cairns
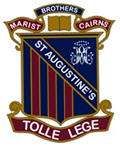

Location
- 251 Draper Street, Parramatta Park; Cairns, Queensland, 4870; Australia
- Coordinates: 16°55′38″S 145°46′03″E

Information
- Type: Independent day and boarding
- Motto: Tolle Lege (Take up and read)
- Religious affiliations: Roman Catholic; Marist
- Established: 1930; 96 years ago
- Principal: Glen Seivers
- Grades: 7–12
- Gender: Boys
- Enrolment: 769 (2015)
- Colours: Cerise and blue
- Website: sac.qld.edu.au

Saint Augustine's College, known locally as "Saints", is a Catholic boys' high school in Parramatta Park, Cairns, Queensland, Australia. Saints houses boarders both from its own students and girls from Saint Monica's High School, also in Cairns.

== History ==
In 1930, the Marist Brothers established the school for boys. Initially there were three Marist brothers and 96 students.

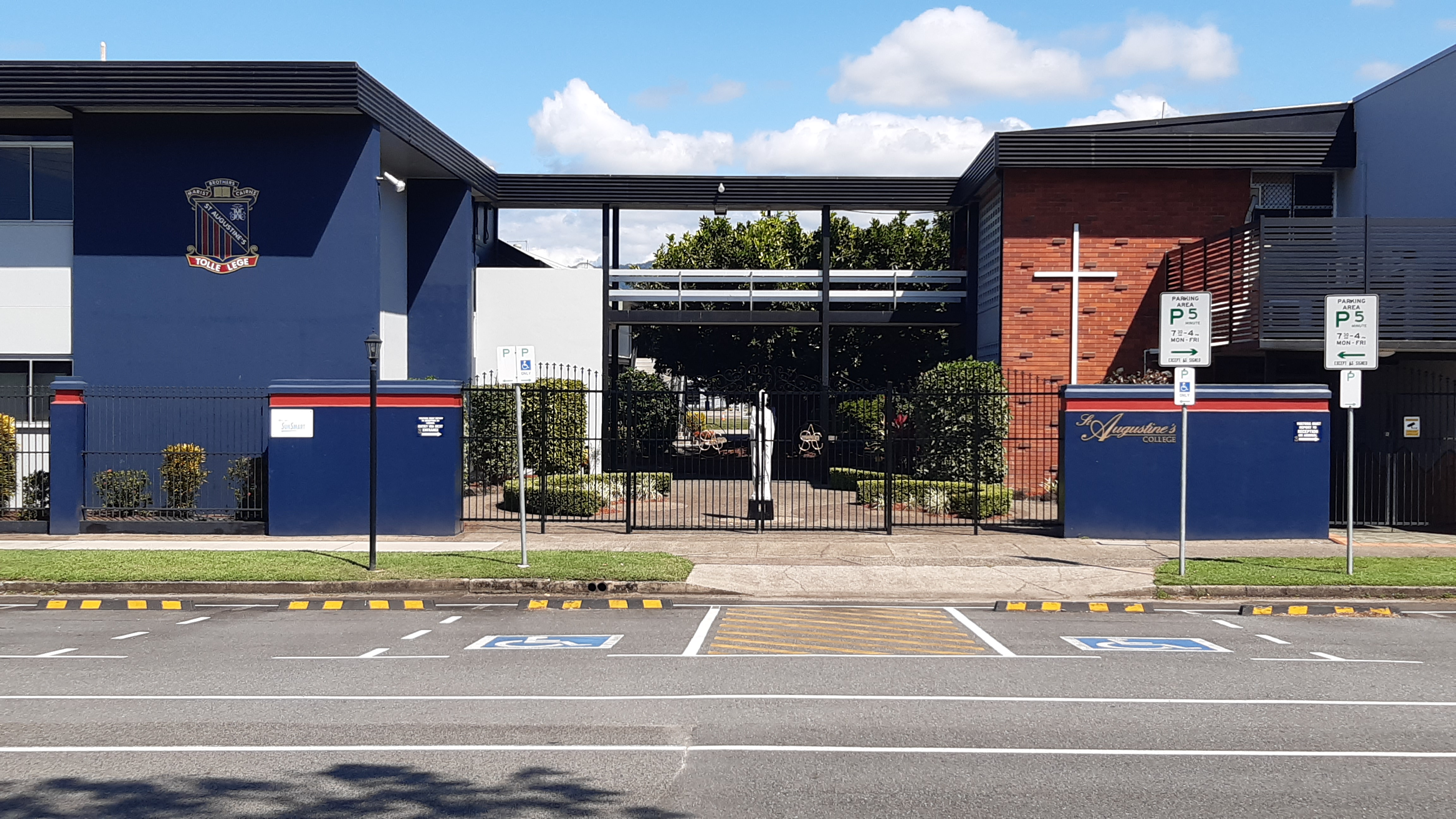
The entrance to the school in 2025

During World War II, air raids on Australian towns by Japan and the fear of an invasion by the Japanese led to evacuations from northern Australian towns. In March 1942, the boarders (being most of the students) were evacuated to the guest house at Lake Barrine.

== Boarding school ==
Saint Augustine's offers a co-ed boarding catering for students from grades 7 to 12. The boarding community includes many students from the Far North Queensland region, along with many country students from outback Queensland and the Northern Territory. A significant number of students also board from as far away as Papua New Guinea, Gove and other islands off the coast of Australia.

== Sport ==
The college is a member of the Cairns Interschool Senior Sport Association (CISSA) which sees a number of local schools compete in a number of different sports each Wednesday. CISSA runs during the first semester of the school year. Saint Augustine's has also been very successful in holding the Overall Boys' TCN Swimming Champion trophy for 40 years.

=== Rugby union ===
The school won all competitions in the 2014 Cairns Schoolboys Rugby Union competition.

=== Hockey ===
The college competed in the Melbourne Grammar School Hockey Tournament in 2022 winning the title undefeated. Team captain Cade Coghlan received player of the tournament in addition to being the top goal scorer.

=== Australian Football Achievements ===
The college competes in the AFL Queensland Schools Cup, the premier Australian Rules Football competition for schools in Queensland, it is run by AFL Queensland.

==== Senior Male (Years 10-12) ====
- State Championships

(bronze) Third Place: 2019, 2022

- North Queensland Championships

(gold) Champions: (6) 2016, 2019, 2021, 2022, 2023, 2024

==== Junior Male (Years 7-9) ====
- State Championships

(silver) Runners Up: 2019

- North Queensland Championships

(gold) Champions: (3) 2019, 2021, 2023

== School houses ==
Saint Augustine's has four houses. They are as follows:

- Heavey (yellow)
- Phealan (green)
- Walter (red)
- Reginald (blue)

These houses compete against each other in many activities, including annual athletics and swimming carnivals, public speaking, and a competition on Champagnat Day. These events build up to a House Cup which is awarded at the end of each year.

Former houses include:

- Ambrose (black)
- Gildas (white)

== School facilities ==
- Performing arts hall (McLaughin Theatre)
- Multi-purpose hall (Lennon Hall)
- Swimming pool
- Gym
- Basketball courts
- Cricket nets
- Music rooms
- Seminar rooms
- Computer rooms
- Science Labs
- Chapel
- Home Economics rooms
- Media & technology
- Kitchen
- Boarding facilities
- Medical centre
- Library
- Woodworking and metalworking facilities
- Marist Brothers residence

== Marist sexual misconduct ==
Brother Ross Francis Murrin, who taught at the school between 1979 and 1981, is under police investigation in relation to a charge of sexual misconduct while he was working at St Augustine's College according to a February 2009 Cairns Post report. Murrin is currently serving a jail sentence for sex crimes committed whilst at other schools.

Brother Geoffery Sydney Veness, a one time principal of the college, pleaded guilty to offences against a male pupil at the school and was convicted and given a one-year suspended jail sentence in 2001. The suspended sentence proved quite controversial with the trial judge coming under regular scrutiny for allegedly being lenient in the sentencing of sex offenders including Veness.

Brother Gregory James Carter pleaded guilty on 17 December 1997 to 15 counts of indecent treatment of a 15-year-old student who was a boarder in Year 10 at the college.

== AMSA ==
The college hosted the Australian Marist Schools Association Basketball Carnival in April 2008.

The college takes part in the annual AMSA Marist Cricket Carnival, and hosted the carnival in 2016.

== Notable alumni ==
- Brad Beven – triathlete
- Jack Bowes – Australian rules football player for the Gold Coast Suns
- Frank Farina – soccer player for the Socceroos
- Jacob Heron – Australian rules football player for the Gold Coast Suns
- Nathan Jawai – basketball player
- Rod Jensen – rugby league player
- Kody Stattmann – basketball player
- Karl Stefanovic – television personality

== See also ==
- Catholic Education Cairns
- List of boarding schools
- List of schools in Far North Queensland
