= Ryan Catholic College =

Location
- Canterbury Road, Kirwan, Townsville, Queensland; Australia; 19°18′53.54″S 146°43′03.72″E

Information
- Type: Independent co-educational primary and high day school
- Religious affiliation: Diocese of Townsville
- Denomination: Roman Catholic
- Established: 1979; 47 years ago
- Principal: Candi Dempster
- Enrolment: Approx. 1990
- Website: www.ryan.catholic.edu.au

Ryan Catholic College is a combined, co-educational, primary and secondary school in what is now the City of Townsville, Queensland, Australia. It was established by the Roman Catholic Diocese of Townsville in 1979. Ryan is the largest catholic school in Townsville.

It currently has over 1900 enrolments and employs approximately 200 teachers. Ryan Catholic College has 2 campuses with a junior school on the smaller campus, with the middle and senior schools located on the main (Ryan) campus.

A new two-storey building was constructed throughout 2007 on the main campus. The building houses classrooms, toilets, showers and a staffroom. The building replaces the former 'temporary' I block, which has been moved and now functions as a permanent set of classrooms.

In 2011, the college opened the Emmaus Hall.

There is a new library that was built in 2018 and finished around November 2019.

== AFL Team Achievements ==
=== Junior Female (Years 7-9) ===
- North Queensland Championships

(gold) Champions: 2019
