= Helensvale State High School =

Location
- Helensvale, Gold Coast; Queensland., 4212; Australia; 27°53′49.837″S 153°19′42.546″E

Information
- Type: State secondary school
- Motto: One student. One community. Many futures.
- Opened: 1990
- Status: open
- School number: 243
- Principal: Karen Lindsay
- Head of school: Thomas Sullivan
- Faculty: 160
- Grades: 7–12
- Enrollment: 1989 (2024)
- Average class size: max 28
- Campus size: 13.62 hectares
- Campus type: Suburban area
- Houses: Habrok, Apollo, Kahu, Bunjil
- Colors: Navy & Green
- Mascot: Hawk.
- Rival: Pacific Pines state high school.
- Website: helensvaleshs.eq.edu.au

Helensvale State High School is a public secondary school located in the suburb of Helensvale on the Gold Coast, Queensland, Australia. It is situated on the corner of Discovery Drive and Helensvale Road (243 Discovery Dr, Helensvale QLD 4212). The school first opened in 1990 with Rod Cassidy as the foundation principal. The School motto is One student, one community, many futures.

Helensvale High caters for a large catchment of students, with nearly 2,000 enrolments, making it one of the largest high schools in the Gold Coast region. In 2024 the housing system got revamped from former student names to mythological birds.

== History ==
Helensvale High commenced in 1990 with barely 200 students and a small staff, numbering 12, led by the inaugural principal, Rod Cassidy. Students came from a wide feeder area, as far north as Jacob's Well, west to Mount Tamborine and south to Gaven, as well as the rapidly growing Helensvale area. Helensvale was the only high school in the area other than Coombabah State High School.

During 1990 all students studied a core of subjects at the year 8 level in the block that is now the Home Economics Block. During this year, staff, students and parents planned the style of school they wished to develop, choosing subjects, planning teaching and learning styles, planning sporting activities as well as performance projects.

During the first five years specialist buildings, including the SAC (Student Activity Centre), which was a state-of-the-art building for education facilities in Queensland and the Performing Arts Centre, the Resource Centre and the Manual Arts Building were planned.

The school was involved in a case which was "believed to be the first Queensland case involving a former student suing over alleged bullying by teachers over mobile phone use". Since this case, Nine News have reported on the same topic of bullying and had created major backlash.

== Sport ==
Sports supported include AFL, Netball, Soccer and more.

Helensvale State High School also participates in Gold Coast Sport North (GCSN).

=== AFL Queensland Schools Cup Achievements ===
The AFL Queensland Schools Cup is the premier Australian Rules Football competition for schools in Queensland, it is run by AFL Queensland.

==== Senior Male (Years 10–12) ====
- AFL Queensland Schools Cup

(gold) Champions: (2) 2019, 2021
(silver) Runners Up: 2016, 2017, 2018, 2020, 2022

- AFL Queensland Schools of Excellence Cup

(gold) Champions: (5) 2008, 2009, 2010, 2011, 2012

==== Junior Male (Years 7–9) ====
- AFL Queensland Schools Cup

(gold) Champions: (3) 2016, 2017, 2018
(silver) Runners Up: 2020
(bronze) Third Place: 2019, 2023

- AFL Queensland Schools of Excellence Cup

(gold) Champions: (3) 2009, 2014, 2015

==== Junior Female (Years 7–9) ====
- AFL Queensland Schools Cup

(bronze) Third Place: 2023

== Performing arts ==
Helensvale offers its students a variety of arts subjects including music, dance and drama. All students are encouraged to engage in extra-curricular activities such as the Gold Coast Drama Festival, Estiedfords and School Musicals.

Helensvale offers its students an array of opportunities in the performing arts. This include the Gold Coast Drama Festival, Rock Eisteddfod, Gold Coast Eisteddfod, school musicals, Dance Ed in the Spotlight, cheerleadering competitions.

== Notable alumni ==
Name	Sport	Top level team/affiliation
Andrew Boston	Australian rules football	Gold Coast
Connor Budarick	Australian rules football	Gold Coast
Aiden Fyfe	Australian rules football	Gold Coast
Dee Heslop	Australian rules football	Gold Coast
Kalinda Howarth	Australian rules football	Gold Coast
Rhys Nicholls	Australian rules football	Gold Coast
Michael Osborne	Australian rules football	Hawthorn
Luke Russell	Australian rules football	Gold Coast
Rory Thompson	Australian rules football	Gold Coast
Serene Watson	Australian rules football	Gold Coast
Lynsey Clarke	Lawn bowls	Australia
Sally Pearson	Hurdling	Australia
Jayden Campbell	Rugby league	Gold Coast
Sam Stosur	Tennis	Australia
Michael Shelley	Marathon	Australia
