= The Range Convent and High School =

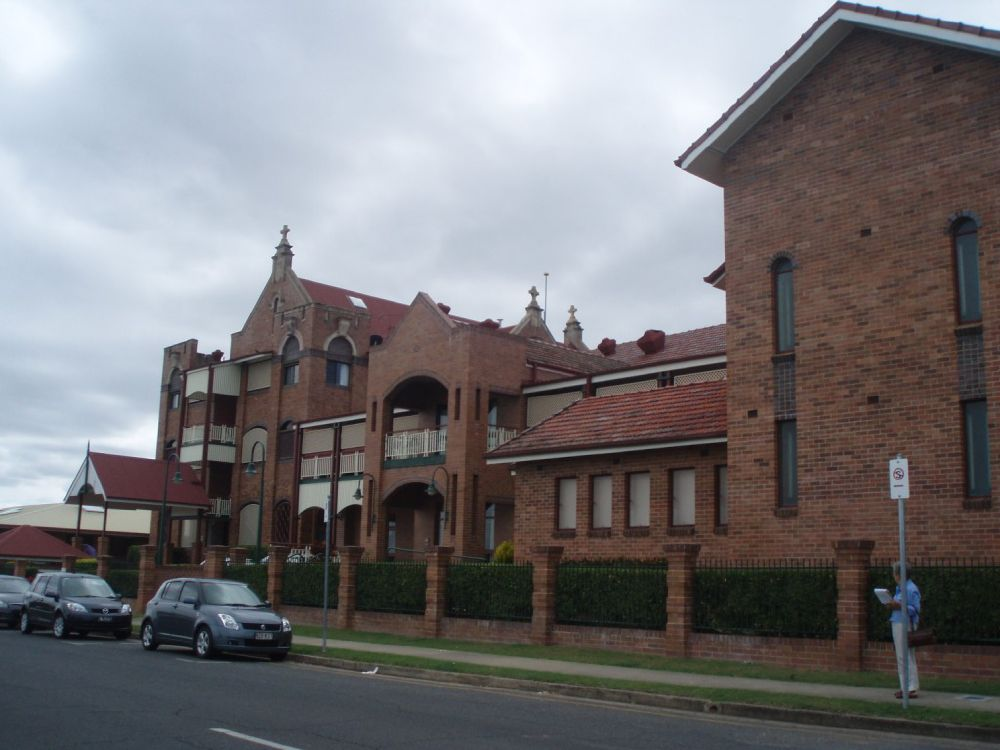
- The Range Convent and High School, view from Agnes Street, 2009

- Location within Queensland Location within Australia
- 23.3926°S 150.4955°E
- Location: 263 Agnes Street, The Range, Rockhampton, Rockhampton Region, Queensland, Australia

History
- Design period: 1870s–1890s (late 19th century)
- Built: c.1880s–1930s

Queensland Heritage Register
- Official name: The Range Convent and High School, Our Lady of Good Counsel Convent and School, The Catholic College Residential
- Type: State heritage (landscape, built)
- Designated: 21 October 1992
- Reference no.: 600779
- Significant period: 1890s–1910s (historical); 1900s–1910s (fabric middle hall); 1880s, 1930s (fabric convent); 1920s (fabric)
- Significant components: Tower, convent/nunnery, garden/grounds, swimming pool, dormitory, classroom/classroom block/teaching area

The Range Convent and High School is a heritage-listed private school at 263 Agnes Street, The Range, Rockhampton, Rockhampton Region, Queensland, Australia. It was built from c.1880s to 1930s. It is also known as Our Lady of Good Counsel Convent and School and The Catholic College Residential. It was added to the Queensland Heritage Register on 21 October 1992.

== History ==
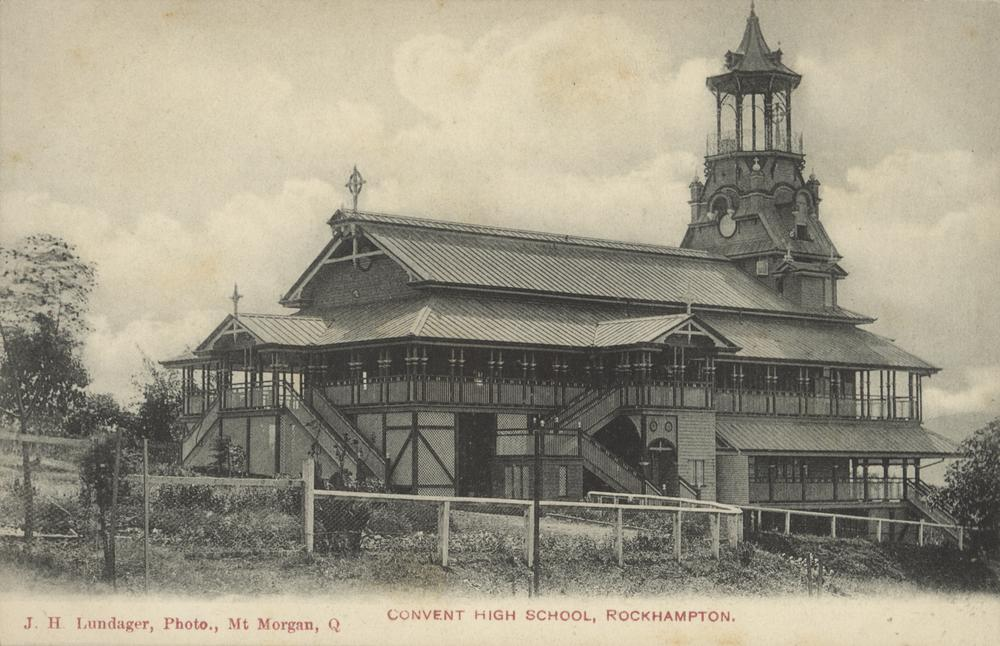
Range Convent School, circa 1907

The first Roman Catholic school in Rockhampton was established in about 1864 by Dean Murlay. When the Sisters of Mercy arrived in Rockhampton in 1873, they took over the running of the primary school and established a high school on the grounds. The school and convent were moved to their current premises on the Athelstane Range, west of the city in 1895.

The Sisters of Mercy in Queensland established the sixth foundation of their order in Rockhampton in 1873, twelve years after their arrival in the state. This was the northernmost foundation and acted as the base for expansion into Central and North Queensland. The seven Sisters under the supervision of their Superior, Sr M Vincent Whitty, were welcomed by Dean Murlay, the parish priest, who provided them with their first convent in Kent Street. Large areas of prominent land had been acquired for the church and a catholic primary school established since Dean Murlay's arrival in Rockhampton in 1863.

The Sisters immediately assumed responsibility for running the Catholic primary school, St Joseph's, and soon established a Catholic secondary school the first in Rockhampton. By October 1895 space at the school was inadequate and the sisters moved to the Athelstane Range slightly west of the centre of Rockhampton to Stoneleigh, the former residence of the Bishop of Rockhampton, Rev John Cani. The building was described as having verandahs on three sides, with four or five internal rooms opening from a central hall. A school room was added to the north wall in early 1896 and the school became known as the School of Our Lady of Good Counsel though due to its situation on Athelstane Range became commonly referred to as The Range Convent and High School. When Bishop Cani died in 1898 he left the heavily mortgaged building and grounds to the Sisters of Mercy.

Improvements were made to the school by the Sisters by 1900 when an upper storey with verandahs was added to the convent and a timber chapel was built. Two Rockhampton architectural firms were employed by the school in this year, Eaton and Bates and EG Walters.

Further work was planned when James Duhig was consecrated as the third bishop of Rockhampton on 10 December 1905. He maintained a strong relationship with the Range convent through his years in Rockhampton and subsequently as Archbishop of Brisbane until his death in 1965. After his consecration Duhig, who espoused a philosophy of education for girls immediately began planning a new school house for the sisters. Local architect and builder, C. Slater, was engaged in 1906 to design the building, Middle Hall, and supervise construction. Bishop Duhig was also actively involved in the design of the building. Shortage of funds meant considerable delays in the construction and it was not completed until early 1908, though its official opening was at the end of year school concert on 7 December 1907.

Middle Hall consisted of two storeys and a tower; ten music rooms, a library, and rooms for photography, art, cooking instruction and a kitchen were on the ground floor and on the first floor was a large hall used for classrooms. Above these rooms, climbing from the rear of the stage of the hall was a timber tower, this consisted of two levels under an open balcony. The open space was to be used as an observatory and cast iron frieze panels designed by Sidney Williams & Co of Rockhampton depicting stars and moons complemented this use.

A feature of Middle Hall was its attention to the health and safety of the occupants. Bishop Duhig consulted a local resident, Dr O'Brien, about these matters and consequently detailed attention was given to the design of the ventilation, drainage and hygiene resulting in 18-foot (5.5 m) wide verandahs surrounding three sides of the building, and the extensive use of Wunderlich pressed metal roof sheeting internally and on the verandah soffits. At its opening Middle Hall, built at a cost of in excess of £2000, was described by Duhig as one of the finest in the state.

Soon after the construction of Middle Hall in 1908 extensive landscaping was completed on the site including the addition of a tennis court carved in the side of the hill, and various walks and carriage ways near a grotto which had been constructed in the grounds by 1906. This area was to become the cloister and remained the focal point of external activity at the school.

Further extensions at the Range were planned in 1920 when dormitory conditions became inadequate and a new building to house the student boarders was planned. The services of Sydney architects Hennessey and Hennessey in conjunction with local Rockhampton architects Hockings and Palmer were engaged A large three storeyed brick building, called Genazzano was constructed at a cost of £16,962/15/3 by a local contractor W. McDonald. It was situated fronting Agnes Street, manifesting the Catholic ethos, particularly that of the then Archbishop Duhig, of creating imposing built structures on prominent sites. The new boarding house accommodated 80 boarders and two supervising sisters, on the top floor, with refectory and recreation halls on the first floor and kitchen and laundry in the basement. Particular attention was paid to ventilation and to a high quality of construction and materials, with specially designed French doors, maple staircase, cedar and silky oak joinery, coved plaster ceilings, leadlighting by Exton and Co. and modern bath and toilet facilities.

In 1926 a swimming pool, with ten changing sheds was constructed, believed to be the first school pool in Rockhampton. It was designed by local architects Hocking and Palmer and constructed by JJ Booker.

By 1930 the nuns' boarding facilities were inadequate and the wing of the convent in which they were located was demolished and a brick dormitory block was constructed. This was also designed by Hennessey, Hennessey and Co, who were working from an office in Brisbane by this time, and erected by R Cousins and Co of Rockhampton. It was a three storeyed building providing community rooms on the ground floor and accommodation above. Archbishop Duhig returned to Rockhampton to lay the foundation stone, and it was opened by him on 30 November 1930.

Further improvements were made in 1949, when a science block in between the convent and the school house was constructed by local builders, JJ Booker and Sons at a cost of £4,150. The building housed domestic science labs and offices on the ground floor and physics and chemistry rooms on the first floor. In 1951 this was extended to accommodate the increasing number of students staying on to complete the Senior Examination.

Religious services at the school remained in the timber chapel until 1956 when a new brick chapel was built to the south of the convent and opened by Archbishop Duhig on 18 November 1956. The timber chapel was moved, renamed Coolock, and used for boarding facilities, this was subsequently moved off the site. The brick chapel was designed by RJ Corbett and constructed by RS Cousins and Co at a cost of £30,000. Four stained glass windows which sat at the rear of the altar were imported from Ireland, and the statue of Our Lady of Good Counsel, after whom the school was named, was placed near its entrance. With the chapel extension the convent building was renovated which involved the removal of external decorative timberwork which was replaced with brickwork designed to complement the other buildings on the site facing Agnes Street.

Many school buildings were constructed on the grounds after this, including new education block designed by local architect R Corbett and constructed in three stages by contractors J Winterflood and G Cook in 1963–6; a new four storey boarding house constructed alongside the timber boarding house, Coolock in 1968; and a science and library block built by KD Morris, to a design by R Corbett in 1971. In the 1970s demountable buildings were erected and extensive landscaping completed. A small brick building was constructed to the east of Genazzano, as the Generalate of the Sisters of Mercy of Rockhampton. In the early 1980s a residence, Lynmara, was acquired by the Sisters of Mercy in the north east corner of the property for use by the "Journey of Youth" programme.

Range College became a junior secondary college in 1983 and a new college, Emmaus was established as the senior catholic college in Rockhampton. By late 1990 Range College was sold to the Catholic Diocese of Rockhampton, who subsequently closed it when they established The Cathedral College, a co-educational school in an area adjacent to St Joseph's Cathedral in central Rockhampton. The boarding houses, Genazzano and Coolock, are used by boarding students of this new college and the Sisters of Mercy still use the convent and chapel.

== Description ==
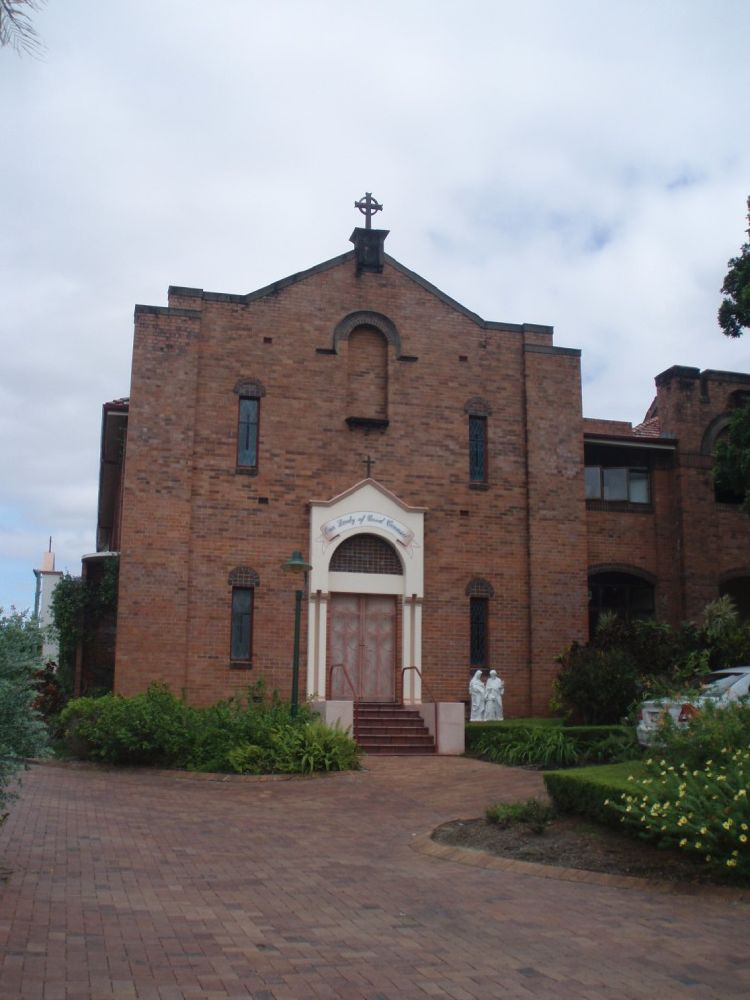
Chapel, 2009

The Range college is situated on the Athelstane Range facing the Rockhampton town centre. The property is bounded by Agnes, Corberry, Penlington, Bauhinia and Gordon Streets on a prominent site.

The Range Convent and High School has a number of significant buildings, structures and garden areas. These include Middle Hall, a two storeyed timber building with tower erected in 1907–8 as a school hall; a collection of brick buildings along the Agnes Street boundary of the school including the convent first used by the school in 1895 with later chapel, students dormitories built in 1921 and nuns boarding facilities dating from 1930; a cloister formed by the courtyard of several buildings which contains established plantings and a grotto; and the swimming pool.

=== The Convent ===
The Convent is a two storeyed timber and masonry building. It consists of the original Bishop's residence, onto which a second storey and subsequent additions have been added. The footprint of the original residence is evident on the ground floor where plastered walls contrast to the timber partitioning used elsewhere in the building. The first extensions to the building are evident in the timber partitioning, fretwork and joinery. The most recent refurbishment of the building is apparent by the external use of face brick, fibre-cement sheeting and the addition of modern services.

=== The Chapel ===
The present chapel was the most recent building designed as part of the Agnes Street streetscape. It is a rectangular brick building at the south end of the convent, with the main entrance on the western end. Internally the building features high-quality timber joinery, four stained glass windows near the altar, as well as a number of important statues.

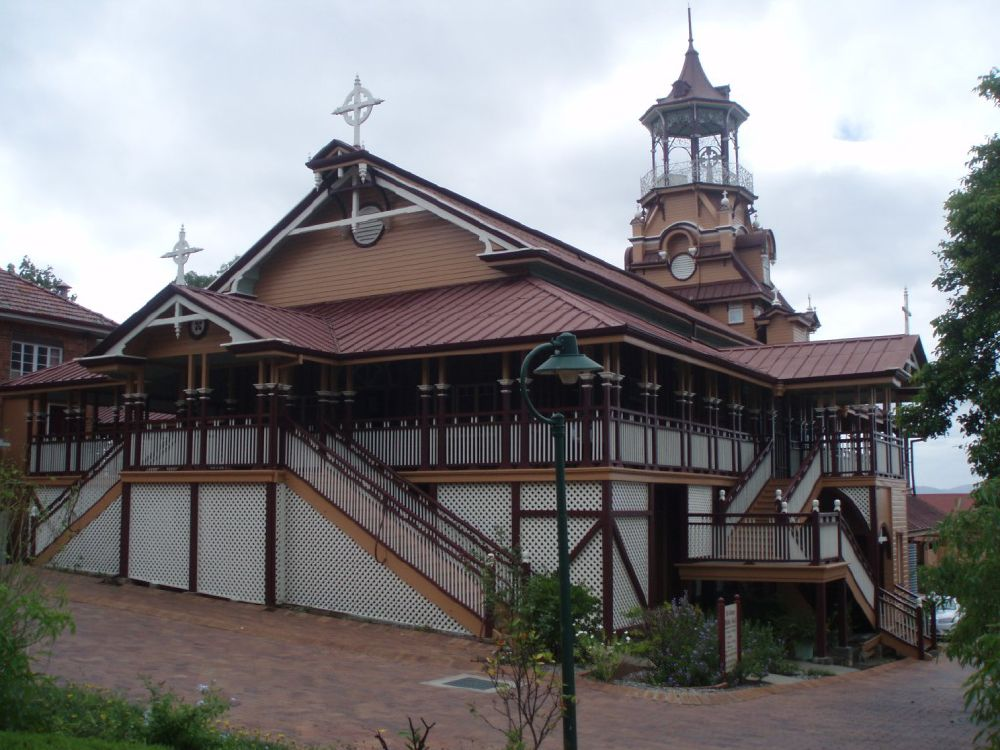
Middle Hall (school house), 2009

=== Middle Hall ===
The school house is a two storeyed timber building with a tower at the eastern end prominently situated in the middle of the school grounds. The rib and pan iron gabled roof is surrounded by verandahs on three sides, which are supported on pairs of chamfered timber columns. Small gables project over the verandahs defining the timber stairways. The tower is an extraordinary structure decorated with timber mouldings, dormer windows, religious motifs and a Wunderlich fish scale pattern spired roof. Wrought iron balustrading encircles the open platform outside the timber columns which are joined with cast iron arched frieze panels. Internally the first floor, a large hall, has a Wunderlich pressed metal ceiling as does the soffit of the 18-foot (5.5 m) wide verandahs.

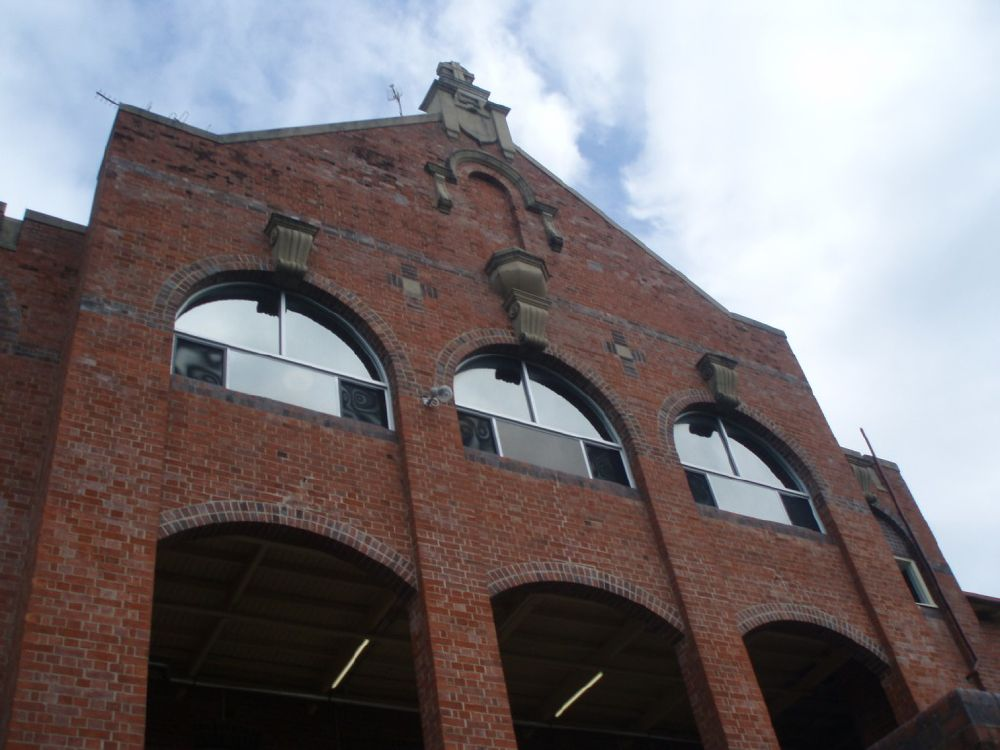
Genazzano, 2009

=== Genazzano ===
Genazzano is a three storeyed symmetrically composed brick building located on Agnes Street, the first of the brick buildings on this boundary of the site and the model for the later buildings. The rectangular building has a corrugated iron gabled roof with iron ridge ventilators. The building has brick parapeted sections at the two gable ends to the north and south and defining the entrances on the east and west facades. The triangular parapets feature round head arches, mouldings and brick corbelled towers. The rectangular building is surrounded on four sides by three storeys of brick arched verandahs.

=== The Convent Dormitory ===
The convent dormitory is a three storeyed brick building, similar in appearance to Genazzano, to the north of the convent. It has three storeys of brick arched verandahs and a corrugated iron gabled roof with parapeted gable ends similar to those of Genazzano. The ground floor has lounge to the east and single dormitories to the west, a single flight stair joins the central corridors on the upper two floors, located off which are the single bedrooms which open onto the wide verandahs.

=== The Cloister ===
Middle Hall, the convent, dormitory and chapel frame a courtyard used as a cloister, which features a large established tree with other early planted beds and a vine-covered stone grotto with a statue of Our Lady of Lourdes. This is a carefully designed space, which forms the introspective focus of the buildings on the site.

=== The Swimming Pool ===
The swimming pool is surrounded by a platform of rendered white concrete and has bathing sheds to the east.

== Heritage listing ==
The Range Convent and High School was listed on the Queensland Heritage Register on 21 October 1992 having satisfied the following criteria.

The place is important in demonstrating the evolution or pattern of Queensland's history.

The Range Convent is a site of cultural significance for its long association with the Sisters of Mercy; this was the sixth foundation of the order in Queensland and has been a head convent in North Queensland since 1873.

The convent and school have developed on the site on Athelstane Range for nearly one hundred years and provide evidence of the pattern of growth of both Rockhampton and the Sisters of Mercy in Central and North Queensland.

The place is important because of its aesthetic significance.

Middle Hall has been a prominent landmark in Rockhampton since its construction in 1907–8 and is a virtuoso example of timber architecture. Genazzano and the nun's dormitory are good examples of the religious work of the architects, Hennessey and Hennessey.

The wide verandahs and internal planning of many of the early buildings on the site, including Middle Hall, Genazzano and the nun's dormitory were designed to ensure good ventilation and privacy in external areas of the buildings.

The buildings facing Agnes Street, including the nun's dormitory, the convent and chapel, Genazzano and Coolock form a prominent landmark in the city, thereby manifesting the catholic ethos of exploiting imposing sites.

The place has a strong or special association with a particular community or cultural group for social, cultural or spiritual reasons.

The buildings and spaces on the site form a cohesive introspective group which reflect its use by Sisters of Mercy for catholic education.

The place has a special association with the life or work of a particular person, group or organisation of importance in Queensland's history.

The Range Convent is a site of cultural significance for its long association with the Sisters of Mercy; this was the sixth foundation of the order in Queensland and has been a head convent in North Queensland since 1873.

The Range has associations with the first Bishop of Rockhampton Rev John Cani in whose house the convent was originally based and Archbishop James Duhig who, from 1905 until his death in 1956 was actively interested in the development of the place.

== See also ==
- The Cathedral College, Rockhampton
