= St Margaret Mary's College =

Location
- Crowle St; Townsville, Queensland; Australia; 19°16′39.77″S 146°47′56.74″E

Information
- Type: Private School
- Motto: Christus Veritas (Christ [is] Truth)
- Religious affiliation: Catholic
- Established: 1963
- Founder: The Sisters of the Good Samaritan
- Principal: Kathleen McCarthy
- Gender: Girls
- Enrolment: 670
- Houses: Karinya (green), Alinta (red), Kiata (blue), Anunaka (yellow)
- Colours: Royal blue, emerald green and white
- Website: http://www.smmc.catholic.edu.au/

St Margaret Mary's College is an all-girls Catholic school in the suburb of Hyde Park, Townsville, Queensland Australia and caters for years 7–12. St Margaret Mary's College is the sister location for Ignatius Park College.

== History ==
In 1936, the first Sisters of the Good Samaritan arrived in Townsville to run the Saint Margaret Mary's Primary school. Bishop McGuire had purchased ‘Woodlands’, in Hyde Park from the Cummins family so that it could be used as a convent, which the Sisters named Saint Philomena's. In 1954, Bishop of Townsville, H.E. Ryan laid the foundation stone for St Margaret Mary's church and in 1956 the present Church was opened on the current site of the college.

Saint Margaret Mary's College was officially opened on 22 February 1963 by the then Bishop of Townsville, H.E. Ryan. The school consisted of four classrooms, one office, staffroom, tuckshop, cloakroom and a ‘modern’ science lecture room. Fifty students were enrolled, although the school had capacity for 200 girls. The school was operated by the Sisters of the Good Samaritan and the first Principal was Mary de Lourdes. The parish priest at the time, Monsignor Vandeluer, was the driving force behind the establishment of the college. The first lay Principal was Mike Byrne who was appointed in 1982. Currently Kathy Park is the principal of St Margaret Mary's College as of 2012 taking over for Peter Griffin who was principal in 2010–2011.

Over the years the college has shaped its curriculum to reflect current educational trends and best practice. In 1997, Vocational, Education and Training (VET) subjects were introduced.

== Campus ==
Saint Margaret Mary's College has seen a number of major projects that include: a multipurpose sports facility, extension to library and staffroom, a textiles room, a new chapel and tuckshop as well as renovations to the kitchen, library, administration block and laboratories. In 2005 two new computer rooms and class rooms were built and refurbishment commenced to create four state of the art Science rooms and a Graphics room. This refurbishment has since been completed and is now currently enjoyed by the 600+ students of the college. Currently the school is undergoing extensions to accommodate year 7's. The new buildings are a new administration block, dance room, art room etc.

== AFL Team Achievements ==
=== Junior Female (Years 7-9) ===
- AFL North Queensland Schools Cup

(gold) Champions: 2024
