= Varsity College =

Varsity College Australia
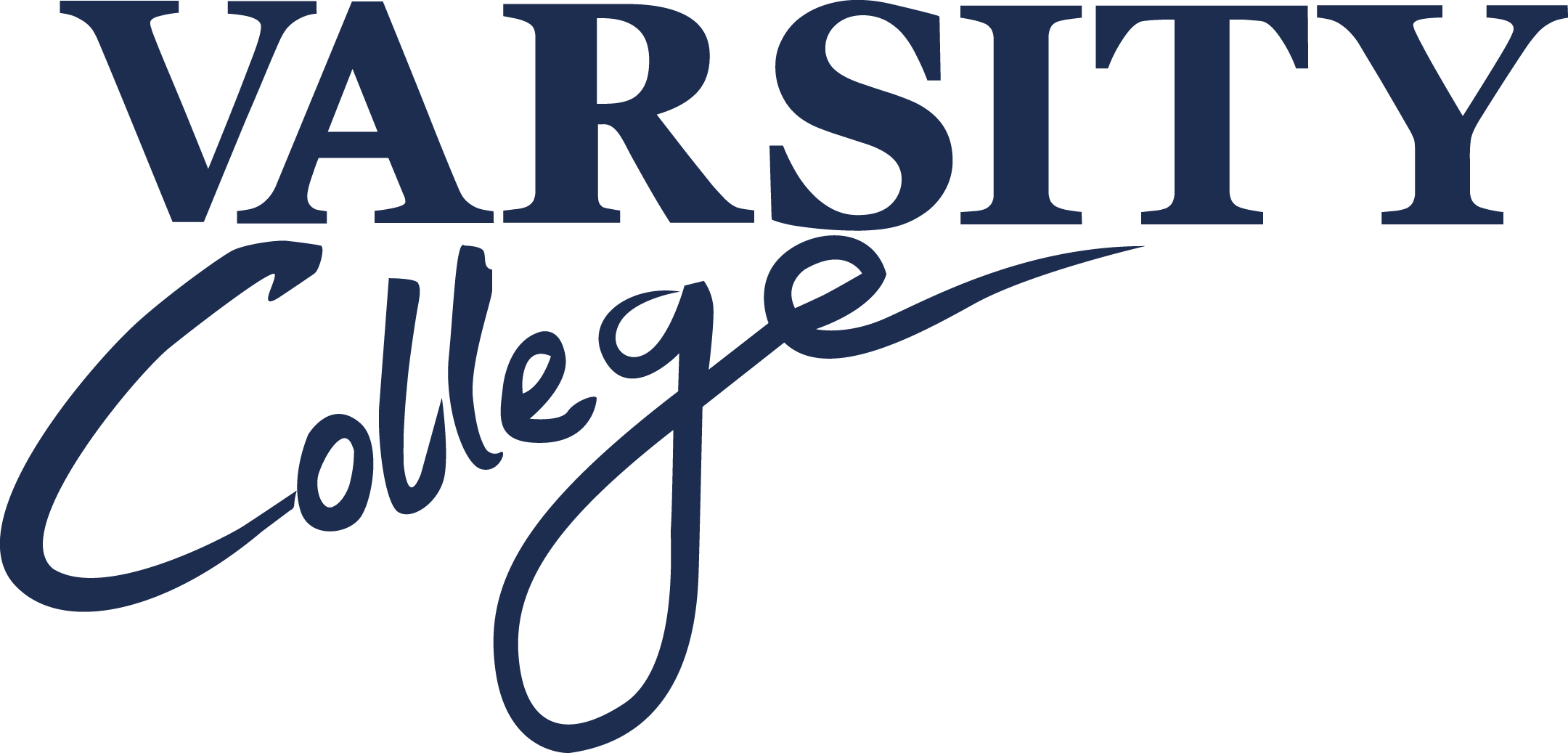
- The varsity college logo.

Location
- 198 Varsity Parade Varsity Lakes, Queensland; Gold Coast, Queensland, 4227; Australia; 28.078°S 153.411°E

Information
- Type: Independent primary/secondary state day school
- Motto: Dare to Dream
- Established: January 2001
- Executive principal: Nigel Hughes
- Grades: P–12
- Enrolment: 3,400 (August 2023)
- Average class size: 23
- Language: English
- Hours in school day: 8:30 to 2:40
- Houses: Rainbow, Burleigh, Miami, Kirra
- Colours: Navy, gold, and grey
- Website: varsitycollege.eq.edu.au

Varsity College is a primary and secondary school in Varsity Lakes (Queensland, Australia).

== Infrastructure ==
On 25 July 2001, Stage 1 of the school was officially opened by Hon Peter Beattie (Premier of Queensland). On 13 August 2002, stage 2 of the school was officially opened by Anna Bligh (Queensland Minister for Education), a project costing $18 million (State and Federal Government funding). In 2002, the school opened a secondary campus, then known as "Varsity College Middle School".

On 3 April 2004, the school's Senior Sports Centre, Performing Arts Centre and the Senior General Learning building were officially opened by Senator George Brandis. In 2005, the "Lake Orr" footbridge, connecting both campuses, had been constructed. In 2010, the Senior Learning Centre (SLC), originally known as the "Chinese Language & Cultural Centre of Excellence", was officially opened by Hon John-Paul Langbroek. In 2015, the Junior Learning Centre was officially opened.

In 2019, an outdoor multi purpose sports court (known as "The Hanger"), was built at the secondary campus.

== School leadership ==
In 2001, on the school's opening year, Mr Micheal Roberts was the Preparatory School Principal and Mrs Julie Grantham was the College Principal. Since then, the school has had multiple principals:

Principals
Principal	Years
Julie Grantham	2001–2002
Tracey Cashman	2002–2004
Mike Kelly	2004–2005
Jeff Davis	2005–2015
Steven McLuckie	2015–2018
Sharon Schultz	2018–2023
Nigel Hughes	2023–present

== Students ==
=== Years ===
In 2002, with the opening of the school's then "Middle School", the school enrolled students for years 4 - 9. In 2005, the school enrolled students for year 12, inducting the school's first premier College Captains.

=== Class sizes ===
The trend in the average size of classes has been: -

Movie Premiers
Year	Years			
Year	Prep – Year	4 – 6	7 – 10	11 – 12
2016	23	25	26	20
2017	24	26	25	21
2018	23	26	25	19
2019	24	27	24	19
2020	22	26	24	20
2021	22	26	23	19
2022	21	26	23	19
2023	TBA	TBA	TBA	TBA

=== Student enrolments ===
In 2023, Varsity College was reported to have a maximum student enrolment capacity of 3,619 students. The number of students entering Prep in any given year must not exceed 200 in 8 classrooms, unless there are more than 200 students enrolling from within the catchment area. With respect to the school's "Programs of Excellence in Academic, Cultural and Sports Excellence", the school has an enrolment capacity of:

- 425 students - Academic Program of Excellence
- 400 students - Cultural Program of Excellence
- 300 students - Sports Program of Excellence

Upon opening in 2001, the school had an initial cohort of 354 students from preschool to Year 3. In 2006, Varsity College reached over 2,500 enrolments across both campuses. The trend in school enrolments (August figures) has been:-

Year	Years													Boys	Girls	Total
Year	Prep	1	2	3	4	5	6	7	8	9	10	11	12	Boys	Girls	Total
2014	__	__	__	__	__	__	__	__	__	__	__	__	__	1,592	1,477	3,069
2015	__	__	__	__	__	__	__	__	__	__	__	__	__	1,606	1,500	3,106
2016	__	__	__	__	__	__	__	__	__	__	__	__	__	1,593	1,513	3,106
2017	__	__	__	__	__	__	__	__	__	__	__	__	__	1,655	1,568	3,223
2018	209	221	212	216	200	233	233	362	332	338	289	170	254	1,694	1,575	3,269
2019	179	222	223	222	217	223	249	341	350	323	311	258	161	1,618	1,598	3,279
2020	184	176	235	231	224	240	341	347	339	337	307	276	233	1,729	1,641	3,370
2021	180	189	180	238	228	227	241	335	350	327	312	283	255	1,700	1,645	3,345
2022	172	183	197	186	247	230	237	367	329	353	294	289	260	1,609	1,654	3,344
2023	TBA	TBA	TBA	TBA	TBA	TBA	TBA	TBA	TBA	TBA	TBA	TBA	TBA	TBA	TBA	3,400

=== Attendance ===
The trend in student attendance has been: -

Year	Years													Overall
Year	Prep	1	2	3	4	5	6	7	8	9	10	11	12	Overall
2016	93%	93%	94%	93%	94%	94%	95%	93%	92%	90%	89%	91%	91%	92%
2017	95%	93%	93%	94%	94%	94%	93%	93%	91%	90%	89%	92%	92%	92%
2018	94%	94%	94%	94%	93%	94%	93%	93%	90%	90%	88%	91%	92%	92%
2019	94%	94%	94%	94%	94%	94%	93%	92%	91%	89%	89%	90%	90%	92%
2020	93%	92%	92%	92%	91%	91%	91%	91%	90%	89%	89%	90%	89%	91%
2021	95%	94%	94%	94%	93%	93%	92%	91%	89%	87%	89%	88%	88%	91%
2022	91%	90%	91%	91%	90%	90%	89%	87%	85%	84%	83%	87%	84%	87%
2023	TBA	TBA	TBA	TBA	TBA	TBA	TBA	TBA	TBA	TBA	TBA	TBA	TBA	TBA

=== Discipline ===
The trend in student discipline has been: -

Movie Premiers
Year	Short Suspensions 1 – 15 days	Long Suspensions 6 – 20 days	Exclusions	Enrolment Cancellations	Total
2016	223	2	10	9	244
2017	249	15	6	9	279
2018	290	8	10	4	312
2019	306	10	11	3	330
2020	163	6	4	1	174
2021	308	25	10	3	346
2022	192	42	8	5	247
2023	TBA	TBA	TBA	TBA	TBA

== Curriculum ==
=== Languages ===
The school's language department offers Mandarin from prep to year 12. The school also runs an English as an Additional Language or Dialect (EAL/D) support team.

== Sports ==
=== Participation ===
During the school year, students participate in a range of carnivals, including cross country running, track and field, and swimming. Age champions are awarded for students who excel in these fields.

=== House system ===
The school has four sporting houses, named after "iconic" Gold Coast beaches:

Current House System
House Name	Colour	Mascot	Student Surname	Gold Coast Beaches
Burleigh	blue	barracudas	A B C D	Burleigh Beach
Kirra	yellow	sharks	E F G H I J K	Kirra Beach
Miami	green	rays	L M N O P Q	Miami Beach
Rainbow	red	serpents	R S T U V W X Y Z	Rainbow Beach

=== AFL Team Achievements ===
==== Senior Female (Years 10-12) ====
- AFL Queensland Schools Cup

(gold) Champions: 2020
(silver) Runners Up: 2021, 2024

===== Junior Female (Years 7-9) =====
- AFL Queensland Schools Cup

(silver) Runners Up: 2019, 2020, 2021, 2023, 2024

== Popular culture ==
In 2002, the series The Sleepover Club was shot and partially produced at the school.

The college has appeared in Sea Patrol.

== Notable alumni ==
=== Sport ===
Name	Sport	Top Level Team/Affiliation
Charlotte Hammans	Australian rules football	Carlton, Gold Coast
Havana Harris	Australian rules football	Gold Coast
Leo Lombard	Australian rules football	Gold Coast
Sienna McMullen	Australian rules football	Gold Coast
Nyalli Milne	Australian rules football	Gold Coast
Jake Rogers	Australian rules football	Gold Coast
Kwame Yeboah	Soccer	Australia (U23)
Kiah Melverton	Swimming	Australia
Maddy Gough	Swimming	Australia
