= Brisbane South State Secondary College =

State secondary school in Dutton Park, Queensland, Australia

Coordinates: 27°29′45″S 153°01′36″E

Location
- 179 Annerley Road; Dutton Park, Queensland, 4102; Australia

Information
- Type: State School
- Mottoes: The New Standard; Novo Discere Mundo
- Established: 1 January 2021
- Educational authority: Department of Education (Queensland)
- School code: 00608A
- Principal: Brendan Barlow
- Enrolment: 1240 (As of 2025)

Brisbane South State Secondary College (BSSSC) is a co-educational, state secondary school, located in Dutton Park, Queensland, Australia. It was built with the purpose of taking the stress off nearby high school, Brisbane State High School, due to Brisbane's growing population. While BSSSC accepts all students from inside the catchment zone, the college offers two selective entry programs, the AFL Academy, and the Biomedical Science Academy (provided in collaboration with the University of Queensland). Since 2022, BSSSC has been a Microsoft Showcase School.

== History ==
Originally named Inner-City South State Secondary College (ICSSSC), the Queensland Government announced plans for a new school located in the Brisbane Knowledge Corridor. The proposal was part of an initiative to relieve enrolment pressure on Brisbane State High School and cater to population growth, with the master plan being developed in 2019. The school was established in January 2021, opening with 203 foundation year 7 students and adding a new year level each year until full operation in 2026. Despite the school being built to ease enrolment pressure off nearby schools, approximately 65% of those students were estimated to reside outside of the school's catchment zone. The $153.78-million school was officially opened on June 7, 2022, by Queensland Premier Annastacia Palaszczuk and Education Minister Grace Grace.

== Architecture ==
Brisbane South State Secondary College was built by Broad Construction and designed by Plus Studio. The college is seven stories tall, standing at 33 metres. BSSSC was built as a vertical school in order to be as efficient as possible with the limited land they had available at their disposal to build the campus. Because of this, the school features concrete columns running through every level and notable metal fence around each level.

== Student body ==
The college is currently on its first year of grade 12 students, the cohort being led by school captains David, Ananya, Batoul and Isaac which have helped to create the school culture and bring out student voice. The student population as of 2026 is 1236: 649 male and 587 female

== Culture ==
The school has developed into hosting and participating in community events. To celebrate the annual Brisbane Riverfire event, the school opens outside of school hours and hosts events such as student music displays and stalls selling food and drink, and opens the upper level to watch Riverfire's flyovers and fireworks

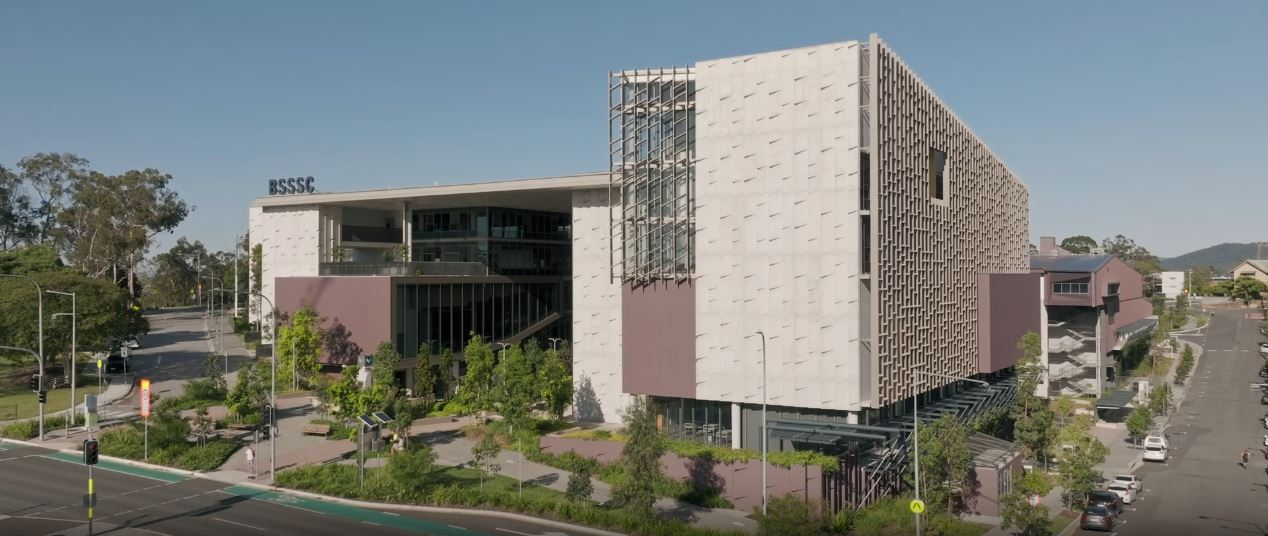
The front of Brisbane South State Secondary College in 2024.
