= Kedron State High School =

Location
- 34 Park Road; Kedron, Queensland, 4030; Australia; 27°24′53″S 153°02′21″E

Information
- Type: Secondary nondenominational public school
- Motto: Latin: Niti est Nitere (To strive is to shine)
- Established: 1 January 1956
- Principal: Michael Rogers
- Enrolment: ~1750
- Campus: Urban (Kedron), 33 acres (13 ha)
- Colours: Black and yellow (gold)
- Website: kedronshs.eq.edu.au

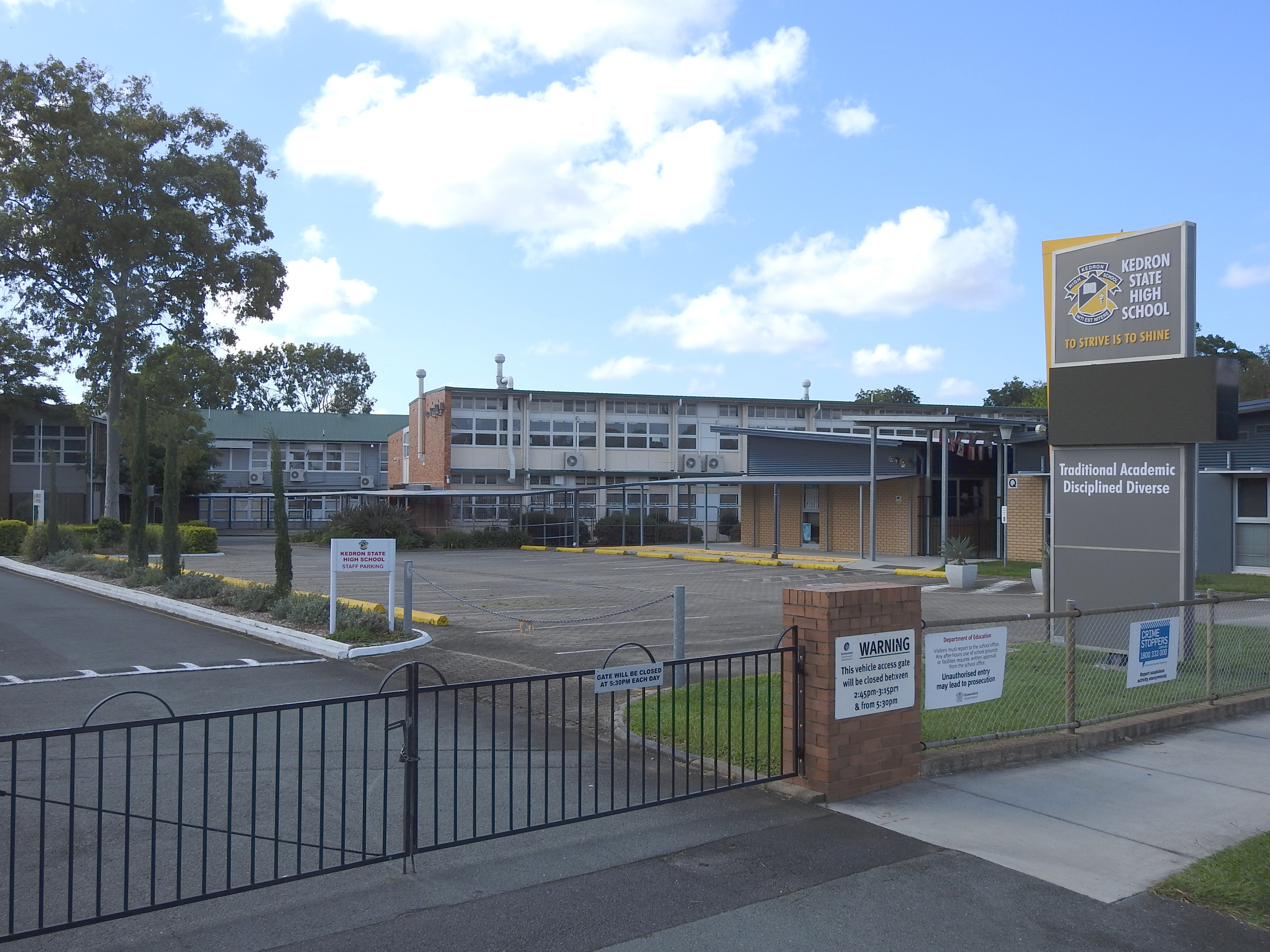
Kedron State High School, Park Road (2021)

Kedron State High School is a Queensland public secondary school which is located in the inner-northern suburb of Kedron in Brisbane, Australia. The school was opened in 1956, to meet the needs of the rapidly expanding North Brisbane population whose children were members of the post-World War II baby boomer generation.

Kedron is a co-educational and non-denominational school, renowned in Brisbane for offering a Special Education Unit for hearing-impaired students and also for its accredited International Students Program. In 2007, the school joined the Healthy State system and removed a large proportion of junk food including all soft drinks. In an effort to increase student voice in the school the "Kedron Connect" program was announced by acting deputy principal for middle school in February 2023.

== History ==
Kedron State High School is situated on 134,000 m^{2} (1,440,000 sq ft) of land bordering Kedron Brook and Kedron Park. Originally inhabited by the Aboriginal Enoggera tribe, the site was also owned by Queensland's first Resident Judge, Alfred Lutwyche. From the 1880s onward it was used as a racecourse which was later partially owned by businessman John Wren in 1912.

Kedron was established in 1956; the school derives its name from the Kidron Valley mentioned in the Bible and located in Israel. Over the years, enrolment has ranged from 274 students in 1956 to 1700 in 1976. Since its inception, almost 20,000 students have attended Kedron. A language census conducted in 2003 revealed 38 languages were spoken within the school community.

In 2006, Kedron celebrated their 50th anniversary and in 2016, their 60th.

Work began on the new performing arts centre in early 2025, which will replace the old front hall.

== International student program ==
Kedron makes use of their substantial language and (EAL/D) program to provide homestays to international students as well as offering full enrolments as part of Education Queensland International (EQI). In partner with their sister school located in Japan, Kedron accommodates over 50 students a year from a range of different countries including Japan, Samoa & Germany and offers facilities such as an international student hub.

== Asbestos ==
During the 2005 school year it was found that a series of seven broken roof tiles containing asbestos where found on school premises. It was later revealed by Queensland education minister Rod Welford that Kedron was one of twenty Queensland schools know at the time to have asbestos in school buildings.

An audit conducted by the Queensland Government on asbestos presence in public schools found that an additional 95 schools including Kedron contained asbestos on school grounds.

== School expansions ==
In 2013 building plans to construct a new block of class rooms (R Block) and a multi purpose teaching and Food Studies block (S Block). In 2015 building was completed on R block followed by the completion of S block in 2019.

Members of the school's Parents-Teachers Association and the local community have been campaigning for a replacement for the schools aging hall and music facilities since 2016. In 2025, plans were approved and construction began. To celebrate the schools 60th anniversary on the 18th of June 2026 and annual 'EXPO' open day, past alumni were invited back to tour the newly opened building. From mid 2026, classes started to use the KPAC (Kedron Performing Arts Centre) consisting of two levels of teaching rooms and various performing arts facilities.

== Sporting houses ==
Kedron State High School has four sporting houses each representing a distinct colour in which students are assigned to and represent during in-school sporting events.

1. Wickham (Green and Yellow)
2. Lutwyche (Blue and white)
3. Bowen (Black and white)
4. Griffith (Red and white)

== Notable alumni ==
- Aliir Aliir – Sydney Swans footballer
- Ally Anderson – Women's Brisbane Lions footballer
- Jason Barry-Smith – opera singer
- David Nilsson – baseball player, previous owner of Baseball Australia and manager of the Brisbane Bandits (2014–2015)
- Rowena Wallace – actress
- Kenneth Wiltshire – professor at the University of Queensland
- Katie Wighton – Singer and Songwriter

== Past principals ==
Period	Name
Unknown–2007	Jim Williams
2007–2014	Myron McCormack
2014–2021	Joseba Larrazabal
2021–2021	Mick Leigh
2021–2024	Blair Hanna
2024–2025	Shane Kiss
2025–2026	Tasmin Buckley
2026–present	Michael Rogers

== Deputy principals ==
There are five deputy principals at Kedron State High School as of August 2025:

- L. Miller (Junior School)
- S. Carlin (Middle School)
- T. Buckley (Senior School)
- Z. Wilson (Student Enhancement and Support)
- K. Hamment (Organisational Capabilities)

== Footnotes ==
1. Education Queensland International schools (2003).
  Official EQI website
2. Australian Deafness Directory (2005).
  Listing in Directory
3. Kedron State High School – About Kedron (2004).
  School Vision and Purpose
