= The Cathedral College, Rockhampton =

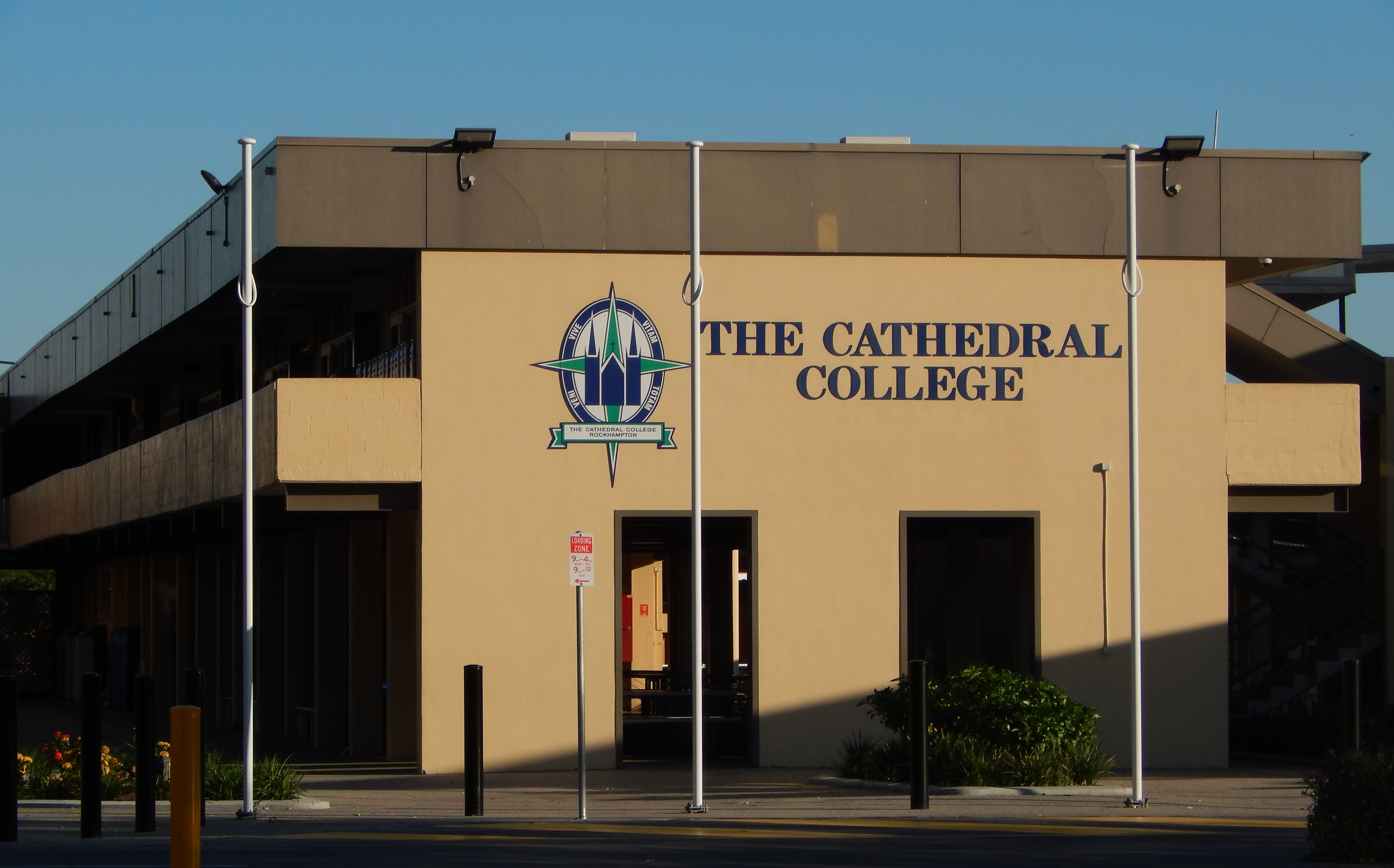
- The Cathedral College, 2021

Location
- Rockhampton, Queensland; Australia; 23°23′07″S 150°30′23″E

Information
- Former name: St Joseph’s Christian Brothers College; Sisters of Mercy Our Lady of Good Counsel College (Range College)
- Type: Independent systemic secondary day and boarding school
- Motto: Come, live life in all its fullness
- Religious affiliation: Catholicism
- Established: 4 February 1991; 35 years ago
- Oversight: Diocese of Rockhampton
- Headmaster: Rob Alexander
- Years offered: 7–12
- Gender: Co-educational
- Enrolment: 940 (2014)
- Website: www.tccr.com.au

The Cathedral College is an independent Catholic systemic secondary day and boarding school for boys and girls, located in Rockhampton, Queensland, Australia. It was founded in 1991 as a Catholic co-educational college for students in Year 8 to Year 12, and included Year 7 students as of 2015.

Prior to the establishment of the college, the Sisters of Mercy's Range College for girls and St Joseph's Christian Brothers' College for boys offered Catholic secondary education for the families of Central Queensland for nearly one hundred years until they were amalgamated to form The Cathedral College, located on the former St Joseph's College site.

The school is administered by the Diocese of Rockhampton.

As of 2021, the principal of The Cathedral College is Rob Alexander.

== Notable alumni ==
- Viv Cooper – politician
- Anna Daniels – author and presenter
- Kobe Hetherington – NRL Player
- Barry O'Sullivan – politician
- Emmanita Paki – NRLW Player
- Dan Russell – PNG Rugby league international

== See also ==
- Catholic education in Australia
- Lists of schools in Queensland
- The Range Convent and High School
