= Draper, Queensland =

Draper
- Suburb
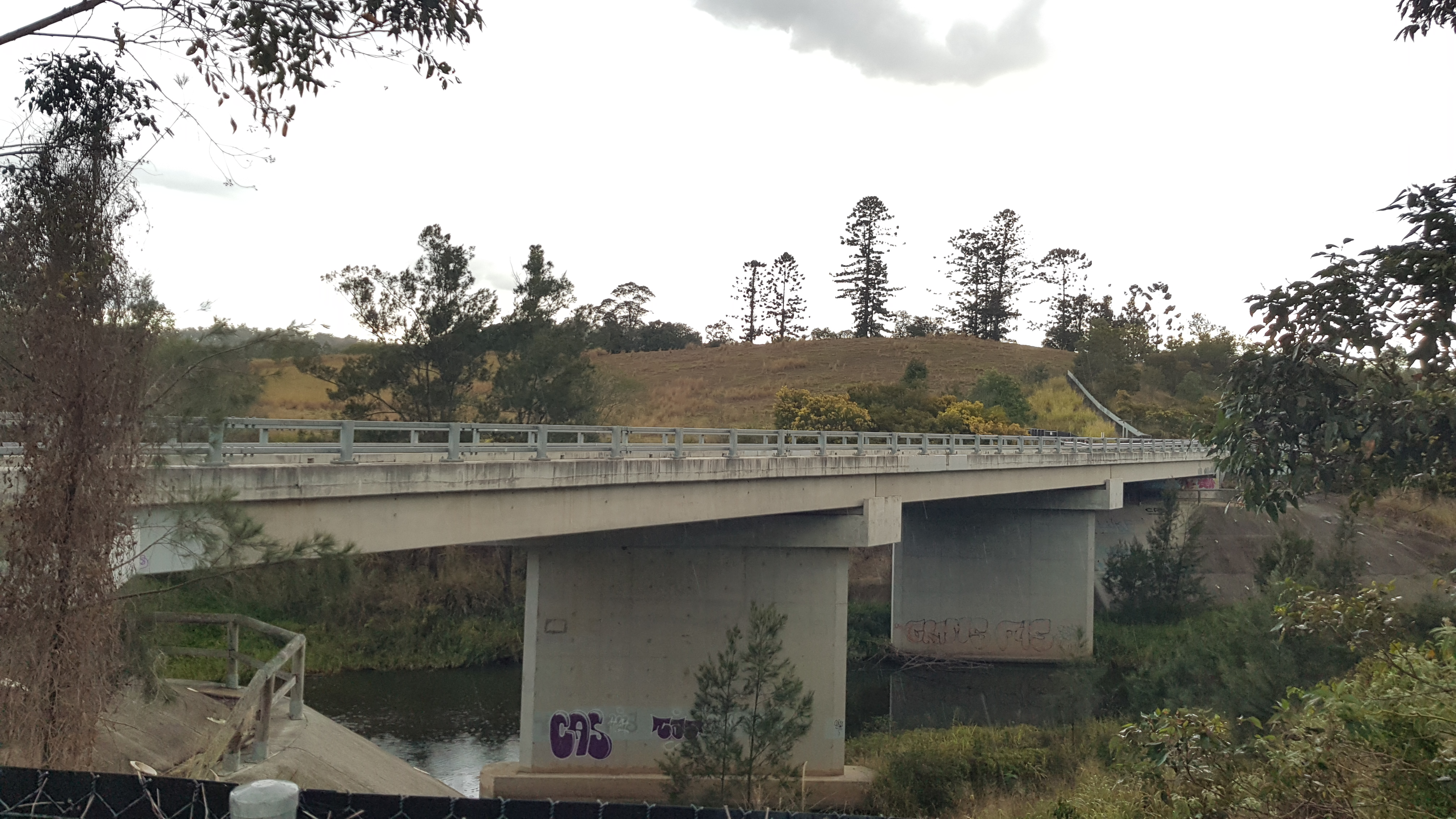
- Broad Bridge, 2023

- Interactive map of Draper
- Coordinates: 27.3580°S 152.9169°E
- Country: Australia
- State: Queensland
- LGA: City of Moreton Bay
- Location: 4.5 km (2.8 mi) N of Samford Village; 11.1 km (6.9 mi) W of Albany Creek; 12.7 km (7.9 mi) NNW of Ferny Grove; 16.0 km (9.9 mi) SW of Strathpine; 26.3 km (16.3 mi) NW of Brisbane CBD

Government
  - State electorate: Pine Rivers
  - Federal division: Dickson

Area
  - Total: 9.5 km^{2} (3.7 sq mi)

Population
  - Total: 695 (2021 census)
  - Density: 73.2/km^{2} (189.5/sq mi)
- Time zone: UTC+10:00 (AEST)
- Postcode: 4520
Suburbs around Draper
Closeburn	Clear Mountain	Eatons Hill
Yugar	Draper	Bunya
Samford Valley	Samford Valley	Ferny Hills

Draper is a rural residential locality in the City of Moreton Bay, Queensland, Australia. In the 2021 census, Draper had a population of 695 people.

== Geography ==
Part of the southern boundary is marked by the South Pine River while the northern boundary follows Cedar Creek.

Drapers Crossing is a ford (27.3502°S 152.9186°E) over the South Pine River.

Eatons Crossing is a ford (27.3448°S 152.9112°E) over Cedar Creek.

The land use is predominantly large-lot residential with some areas of farming, mostly grazing on native vegetation.

== History ==
The locality is named after settler Jacob Draper. He was born in Wiltshire, England in 1841. He immigrated to Moreton Bay in 1861. He died at Bunya in 1913. Drapers Crossing is also named after him.

== Demographics ==
In the 2011 census, Draper recorded a population of 653 people, 50.4% female and 49.6% male. The median age of the Draper population was 39 years, 2 years above the national median of 37. 76.6% of people living in Draper were born in Australia. The other top responses for country of birth were England 5.2%, South Africa 3.4%, New Zealand 2.5%, Scotland 1.7%, Canada 1.2%. 93.1% of people spoke only English at home; the next most common languages were 1.2% Afrikaans, 0.5% Dutch, 0.5% German, 0.5% French, 0.5% Italian.

In the 2016 census, Draper had a population of 676 people.

In the 2021 census, Draper had a population of 695 people.

== Education ==
There are no schools in Draper. The nearest government primary schools are Samford State School in Samford Village to the south-west, Eatons Hill State School in neighbouring Eatons Hill to the north-east, and Patrick Road State School in neighbouring Ferny Hills to the south-east. The nearest government secondary schools are Ferny Grove State High School in Ferny Grove to the south and Albany Creek State High School in Albany Creek to the east.

== Amenities ==
There are a number of parks in Draper, including:

- Jacob Draper Reserve (27.3543°S 152.9203°E)
- Reginald Draper Reserve (27.3605°S 152.9193°E)
- Richard Lawson Park (27.3459°S 152.8892°E)
- Thomas Draper Reserve (27.3587°S 152.9251°E)
- Thomas Morrison Reserve (27.3481°S 152.9180°E)
- Yugar Park (27.3520°S 152.8911°E)
