= Clear Mountain, Queensland =

Clear Mountain Moreton Bay, Queensland
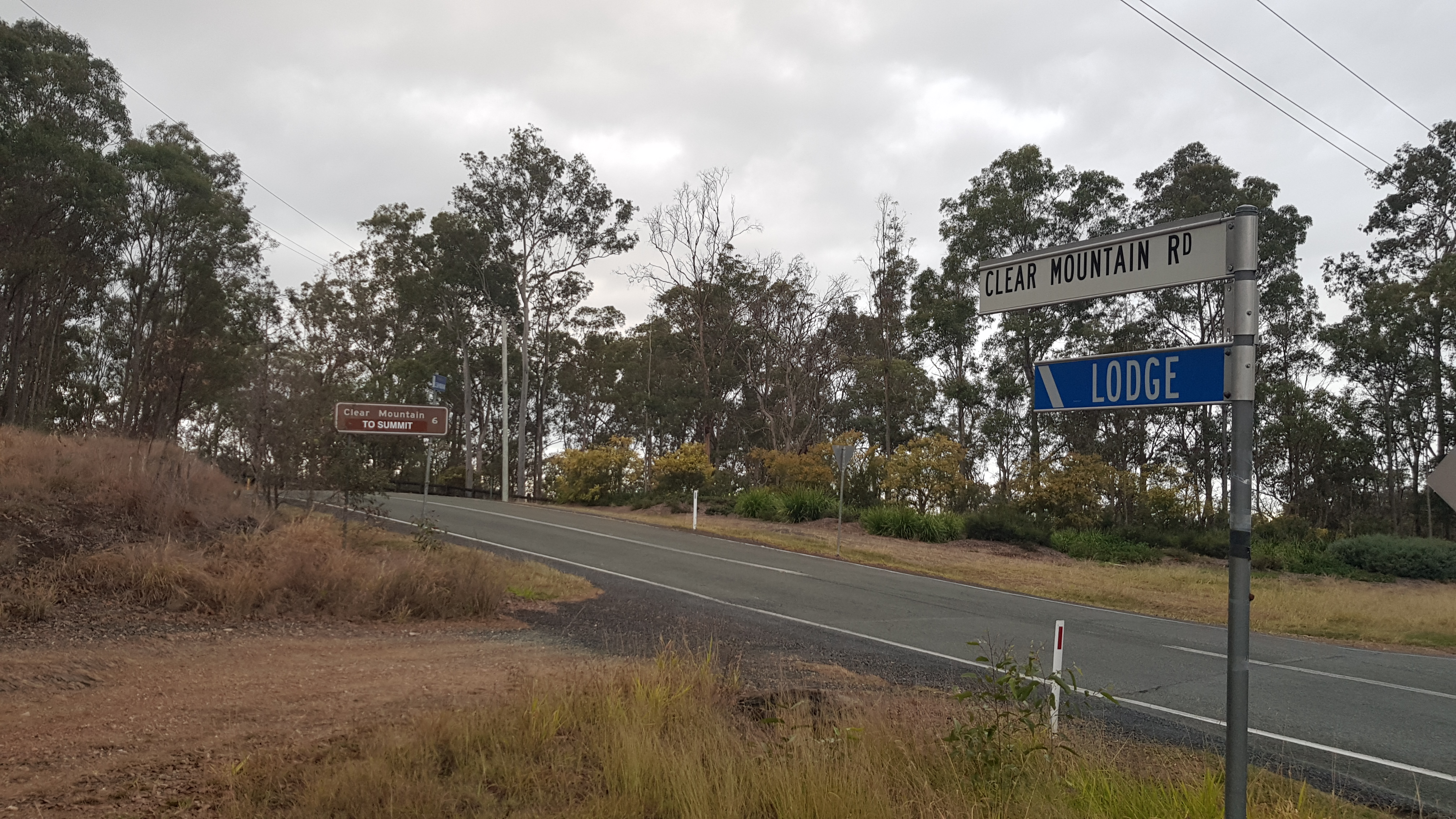
- Clear Mountain Road, 2023

- Coordinates: 27.3186°S 152.8908°E
- Population: 807 (2021 census)
  - Density: 74.7/km^{2} (193.5/sq mi)
- Postcode(s): 4500
- Area: 10.8 km^{2} (4.2 sq mi)
- Time zone: AEST (UTC+10:00)
- Location: 10.9 km (7 mi) NE of Samford Village; 12.0 km (7 mi) SW of Strathpine; 25.0 km (16 mi) NNW of Brisbane CBD
- LGA(s): City of Moreton Bay
- State electorate(s): Pine Rivers
- Federal division(s): Dickson
Suburbs around Clear Mountain:
Mount Samson	Cashmere	Cashmere
Closeburn	Clear Mountain	Cashmere
Closeburn	Draper	Eatons Hill

Clear Mountain is a rural locality in the City of Moreton Bay, Queensland, Australia. In the 2021 census, Clear Mountain had a population of 807 people.

== Geography ==
Its southern border is Cedar Creek, a tributary of the South Pine River. Most of Clear Mountain is an upland, drained southwards by Branch Creek (a tributary of Cedar Creek) and numerous short northerly streams that run into Lake Samsonvale.

Clear Mountain Lookout is on the northern boundary, overlooking rural and forested country. Rural/residential subdivisions are in the south-east corner, adjoining similar settlement in Eatons Hill.

Clear Mountain has acreage homes, bounded by State Forest and the Samford Valley.

== History ==
The alluvial flats along Branch and Cedar Creeks were taken up for corn and vegetable growing, bananas, pineapples, dairying and piggeries.

The Branch Creek primary school opened in 1889 and operated until 1913.

Clear Mountain Provisional School opened on 12 October 1903. On 1 January 1909, it became Clear Mountain State School. It closed in 1947.

Clear Mountain was a suburb of the former Pine Rivers Shire, 20 kilometres (12 mi) north-west of central Brisbane, until the shire was amalgamated into the Moreton Bay Region, now known as the City of Moreton Bay, in 2008.

== Demographics ==
In the 2006 census, Clear Mountain has a population of 707 people. Of these, 51.3% were female and 48.7% were male. 77.9% of people living in Clear Mountain were born in Australia. The other top responses for country of birth were England 7.2%, New Zealand 2.4%, South Africa 2.3%, Scotland 1.1%, Netherlands 0.8%. 91.8% of people spoke only English at home; the next most common languages were 1.4% Afrikaans, 0.7% Italian, 0.7% Danish, 0.6% Cantonese, 0.4% German. The age distribution of Clear Mountain residents is comparable to that of the greater Australian population. 66.1% of residents were over 25 years in 2011, compared to the Australian average of 66.5%; and 33.9% were younger than 25 years, compared to the Australian average of 33.5%.

In the 2016 census, Clear Mountain had a population of 730 people.

In the 2021 census, Clear Mountain had a population of 807 people.

== Education ==
There are no schools in Clear Mountain. The nearest government primary schools are Mount Samson State School in neighbouring Mount Samson to the north-west and Eatons Hill State School in neighbouring Eatons Hill to the south-east. The nearest government secondary schools are Bray Park State High School in Bray Park to the north-east and Albany Creek State High School in Albany Creek to the south-east.

== Sports ==
Clear Mountain is bounded by State Forest, where many people travel to participate in mountain biking, orienteering, walking, horse riding and road cycling. Nearby Albany Creek has rugby and soccer fields, public swimming pool and tennis courts. Samford, a short drive or cycle is home to excellent sports facilities and a gym, some of the local sports played in and around town include swimming, horse riding, soccer, football, cricket, netball, tennis, archery and lawn bowls. The Pine Rivers Shire Council, before its amalgamation, acquired the former CSIRO land which is on the northern edge of the Village and comprises some 140 ha. The Council is planning a sport and recreation facility that will become a major resource for the residents of Samford Valley and the Moreton Bay region. The possible facilities include open space, camp ground, equestrian, tennis, netball, amphitheater, kiosk, soccer and rugby league and parking.

== Climate ==
Clear Mountain has a sub-tropical climate with hot, sometimes humid summers and mild, dry, sunny winters. Most rain falls during the height of summer, between November and February, whilst summer maximum average temperatures generally linger around 30c, in the summer months there are some extremely hot days, sometimes higher than 40c. Winter temperatures are often around 20-25c during the day, with mild evenings, some cold nights and the very occasional frost in some low areas.
