= Samford Valley, Queensland =

Samford Valley Queensland
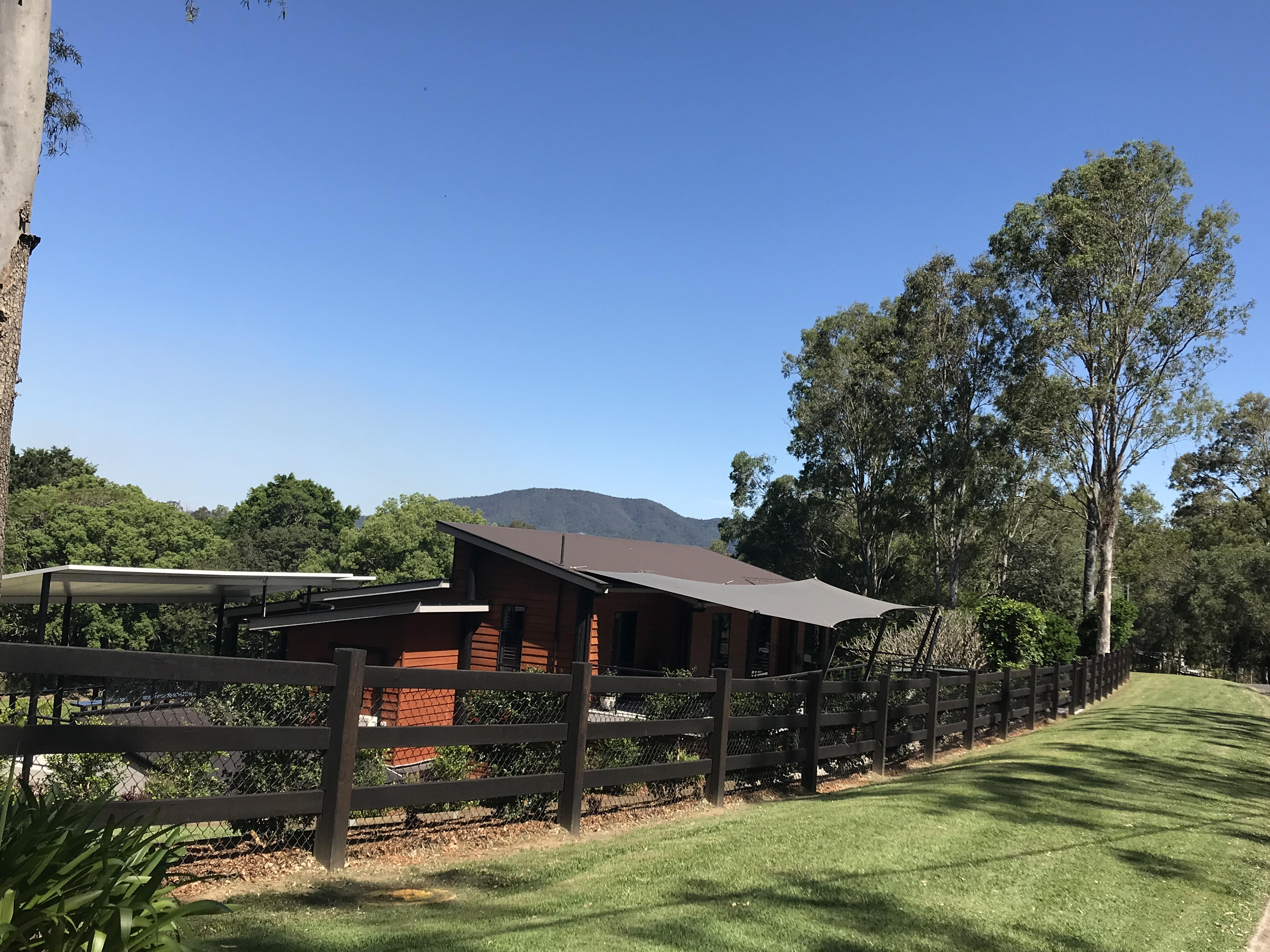
- Contemporary housing, 2022

- Coordinates: 27.3705°S 152.8691°E
- Population: 3,208 (2021 census)
  - Density: 156.5/km^{2} (405.3/sq mi)
- Postcode(s): 4520
- Area: 20.5 km^{2} (7.9 sq mi)
- Time zone: AEST (UTC+10:00)
- Location: 3.8 km (2 mi) W of Samford Village; 20.4 km (13 mi) SE of Strathpine; 25.7 km (16 mi) NW of Brisbane CBD
- LGA(s): City of Moreton Bay
- State electorate(s): Pine Rivers
- Federal division(s): Dickson
Suburbs around Samford Valley:
Cedar Creek	Yugar	Draper
Highvale	Samford Valley	Draper
Wights Mountain	Samford Village; Camp Mountain	Ferny Hills

Samford Valley is a rural locality in the City of Moreton Bay, Queensland, Australia. It is one of two localities in the town of Samford, the other being Samford Village. In the 2021 census, Samford Valley had a population of 3,208 people.

== Geography ==
The terrain in the north of the locality is mountainous, rising to unnamed peaks and ridges at 370 metres (1,210 ft) above sea level as part of House Mountain Range. The mountainous terrain is mostly undeveloped.

The South Pine River rises in Mount Nebo to the west and flows east through neighbouring Highvale into Samford Valley, exiting to Draper in the north-east. Most of the locality is on the lower flatter valley of the river, falling to 50 metres (160 ft) above sea level. The land use on the valley floor is predominantly rural residential (housing on large land parcels).

== History ==
In 1981, the locality of Samford was split into two localities: Samford Village around the town and Samford Valley wrapping around the village to the west, north, and east.

== Demographics ==
In the 2016 census, Samford Valley had a population of 3,068 people.

In the 2021 census, Samford Valley had a population of 3,208 people.

== Education ==
There are no schools in Samford Valley. The nearest government primary school is Samford State School in neighbouring Samford Village. The nearest government secondary school is Ferny Grove State High school in Ferny Grove to the south-east.

Samford Valley Steiner School is in neighbouring Wights Mountain.

== Community ==
The Samford Support Network is a group of volunteers providing a variety of services to community members who are ill, elderly, living with a disability, or struggling.
