= South Pine Road =

Road in Queensland, Australia

South Pine Road (Alderley to Arana Hills) (Road 1) Queensland

General information
- Type: Road
- Length: 7.4 km (4.6 mi)
- Route number(s): No shield (Alderley – Enoggera; (Enoggera – Everton Park); (Everton Park – Everton Hills); ( within Everton Hills)

Major junctions
- Southeast end: Samford Road, Alderley; Enoggera Road, Alderley
- Shand Street; Western Arterial Road (Wardell Street); Everton Park Link Road; East–West Arterial Road (Stafford Road); Everton Park–Albany Creek Road (Old Northern Road); Queens Road; Pimelia Street; Dawson Parade; Plucks Road; Francis Road
- Northwest end: Bunya Road Everton Hills

Location(s)
- Major suburbs: Enoggera, Everton Park

South Pine Road (Albany Creek to Strathpine) (Road 2) Queensland

General information
- Type: Road
- Length: 8.4 km (5.2 mi)

Major junctions
- South end: Albany Creek Road, Bridgeman Downs
- Everton Park–Albany Creek Road (Old Northern Road); Strathpine–Samford Road (Eatons Crossing Road); Old North Road; Linkfield Road
- North end: Brisbane–Woodford Road (Gympie Road) Strathpine

Location(s)
- Major suburbs: Brendale

There are two roads named South Pine Road to the north of Brisbane in Queensland, Australia. They are two separate roads rather than a disconnected single road. It is likely that the duplicate naming is the result of actions by two former local authorities, the Shire of Enoggera and the Shire of Pine Rivers.

The first road (Road 1) runs in a northwesterly direction from Alderley (in the former Shire of Enoggera) to Arana Hills, a distance of 7.4 kilometres (4.6 mi), from where it continues generally northwest as Bunya Road to Draper, where it crosses the South Pine River. It carries the Metroad 5 shield from Enoggera to Everton Park, State Route 29 from Everton Park to Everton Hills, and State Route 40 through Everton Hills.

The second road (Road 2) runs in an indirect northerly direction from Albany Creek (in the former Shire of Pine Rivers) to Strathpine, crossing the South Pine River as it leaves Albany Creek. It carries the name Albany Creek Road through part of Albany Creek, and the State Route 28 shield for its entire length, a distance of 8.4 kilometres (5.2 mi). It is a state-controlled road (number 403), part regional and part district, rated as a local road of regional significance (LRRS).

== Route description ==
=== Road 1 ===
South Pine Road (Road 1) starts at an intersection with Samford Road (State Route 22) and Enoggera Road in Alderley with no route number. It runs northwest by north, crossing the Ferny Grove railway line before reaching a five-way intersection with Sicklefield Road, Pickering Street, and Raymont Road. South Pine Road continues northwest, but there is no entry to it from this intersection, forcing traffic to detour via Sicklefield Road (or Pickering Street). Proceeding north and then west on Sicklefield Road returns the traveller to South Pine Road, which continues west in the locality of Enoggera.

Road 1 turns north at an intersection with Western Arterial Road (Wardell Street) (Metroad 5) and Hurdcotte Street as Metroad 5. Next it turns northwest by north, crossing Kedron Brook as it leaves Enoggera and enters Everton Park, where it passes the exit to Everton Park Link Road to the northeast. It then passes the exit to East–West Arterial Road (Stafford Road) (Metroad 5) to the east before turning northwest with no route number. At an intersection with Everton Park–Albany Creek Road (Old Northern Road) it turns west and then continues in a northwesterly direction as State Route 29 until it reaches an intersection with Queens Road (State Route 40). Here it turns west as State Route 40, leaving Everton Park and the City of Brisbane and entering Everton Hills in the City of Moreton Bay.

Continuing west and southwest to an intersectiom with Pimelia Street (State Route 40) to the southwest, the road turns west with no route number. It passes Dawson Parade to the south and, turning northwest and north, passes Plucks Road to the west. It enters Arana Hills and reaches an intersection with Francis Road to the north, where it turns northwest. Reaching a point where the physical road turns to the northwest by west and the name changes to Bunya Road, South Pine Road ends.

The road is a mix of two and four lane sections. It services the residential and commercial centres along its route.

=== Road 2 ===
South Pine Road (Road 2) starts at a point where Albany Creek Road (State Route 28) crosses Albany Creek, the boundary between Bridgeman Downs in the City of Brisbane and Albany Creek in the City of Moreton Bay. It runs northwest and west as Albany Creek Road (State Route 28) until it reaches an intersection with Everton Park–Albany Creek Road (Old Northern Road) to the southeast, where it turns northwest and north as South Pine Road, crossing the South Pine River and running between Eatons Hill and Brendale. It passes the exit to Strathpine–Samford Road (Eatons Crossing Road) to the northwest and continues north. Turning east it enters Brendale, passes the exit to Old North Road to the north, and continues east to an intersection with Linkfield Road to the east. Here it turns north before turning northeast by east, crossing the North Coast railway line, entering Strathpine and meeting Brisbane–Woodford Road (Gympie Road) (State Route 58) at a T-junction, where it ends.

The road is four lanes for its entire length. It services the residential and commercial centres along its route.

== History ==
In 1844 the "Samsonvale" pastoral run was established on land south of the North Pine River. By 1847 the run had been reduced to 20 square miles – 12,800 acres (5,200 ha) by resumptions to enable closer settlement. Further resumptions were made in the late 1860s.

The locality of Draper, on the north side of the South Pine River, is named for Jacob Draper, an early settler. He arrived in Queensland in 1861 and settled in the area soon after.

In 1843 the Archer brothers built a road to the north of Brisbane as a shorter way to "Durundur" Station near Woodford. Part of this road remains as Old North Road between Rocksberg on the Caboolture River and Wamuran on the D'Aguilar Highway. It is highly likely that the line of road from Alderley to Petrie, comprising South Pine Road (Road 1), Old Northern Road, South Pine Road (Road 2), Old North Road, and Youngs Crossing Road, follows the earlier road.

== Major intersections ==
=== Road 1 ===
All distances are from Google Maps. The road is within the Brisbane and Moreton Bay local government areas.

LGA	Location	km	mi	Destinations	Notes
Brisbane	Alderley	0	0.0	Samford Road – northwest – Enoggera; Enoggera Road – southeast – Newmarket	Southeastern end of South Pine Road. Road runs northwest with no route number.
Brisbane	Enoggera	0.6	0.37	Pickering Street – west – Gaythorne; Raymont Road – east – Alderley; South Pine Road – northwest (no entry) – Enoggera	Road continues north as Sicklefield Road.
Brisbane	Enoggera	0.8	0.50	Shand Street – north – Stafford	Road turns west as Sicklefield Road.
Brisbane	Enoggera	1.1	0.68	South Pine Road – southeast – Alderley	Road continues west as South Pine Road.
Brisbane	Enoggera	1.6	0.99	Western Arterial Road (Wardell Street) – south – Ashgrove; Hurdcotte Street – west – Gaythorne	Road turns north as Metroad 5.
Brisbane	Everton Park	2.2	1.4	Everton Park Link Road – northeast – Everton Park	Road continues northwest.
Brisbane	Everton Park	2.7	1.7	East–West Arterial Road (Stafford Road) – east – Stafford; Griffith Street – southwest – Mitchelton	Road continues northwest with no route number.
Brisbane	Everton Park	3.6	2.2	Everton Park–Albany Creek Road (Old Northern Road) – northwest – Albany Creek	Road turns west as State Route 29.
Moreton Bay	Everton Hills	5.3	3.3	Queens Road – northeast – Mcdowall	Road continues west as State Route 40.
Moreton Bay	Everton Hills	6.1	3.8	Pimelea Street – southwest – Arana Hills	Road turns west with no route number.
Moreton Bay	Arana Hills	6.7	4.2	Dawson Parade – south – Keperra	Road turns northwest.
Moreton Bay	Arana Hills	6.9	4.3	Plucks Road – west – Arana Hills	Road turns northeast.
Moreton Bay	Arana Hills	7.1	4.4	Francis Road – northeast – Mcdowall	Road turns northwest.
Moreton Bay	Arana Hills	7.4	4.6	Bunya Road – northwest – Bunya, Draper	Northwestern end of South Pine Road. Road continues northwest as Bunya Road.
1.000 mi = 1.609 km; 1.000 km = 0.621 mi: Route transition

=== Road 2 ===
All distances are from Google Maps. The entire road is within the Moreton Bay local government area.

Location	km	mi	Destinations	Notes
Albany Creek	0	0.0	Albany Creek Road – southeast – Bridgeman Downs	Southern end of South Pine Road. Road starts as Albany Creek Road (State Route 28) and runs northwest and then west.
Albany Creek	1.8	1.1	Everton Park–Albany Creek Road (Old Northern Road) – southeast – Everton Park	Road continues northwest as South Pine Road, then crosses the South Pine River and turns north.
Eatons Hill, Brendale midpoint	3.0	1.9	Strathpine–Samford Road (Eatons Crossing Road) – northwest – Samford	Road continues north.
Brendale	4.3	2.7	Old North Road – north – Warner	Road turns east.
Brendale	6.5	4.0	Linkfield Road – east – Bald Hills, Bridgeman Downs	Road turns north.
Strathpine	8.4	5.2	Brisbane–Woodford Road (Gympie Road) – northwest – Strathpine – southeast – Bald Hills	Northern end of South Pine Road.
1.000 mi = 1.609 km; 1.000 km = 0.621 mi: Route transition

== Intersecting state-controlled roads (Road 1) ==
The following state-controlled roads intersect with Road 1:

- Western Arterial Road
- Everton Park Link Road
- East–West Arterial Road
- Everton Park–Albany Creek Road

=== Western Arterial Road ===
Western Arterial Road
- Location: Centenary Motorway (Mount Coot-tha Road), Toowong to East–West Arterial Road (Stafford Road), Everton Park
- Length: 8.7 km (5.4 mi)
- Route number: 5

Western Arterial Road is a state-controlled district road (number U18B). It runs from the Centenary Motorway (Mount Coot-tha Road) in Toowong to East–West Arterial Road (Stafford Road) in Everton Park as Metroad 5, a distance of 8.7 kilometres (5.4 mi). It intersects with Samford Sub–Arterial Road (State Route 22) in Enoggera.

=== Everton Park Link Road ===
Everton Park Link Road
- Location: Western Arterial Road (South Pine Road), Everton Park to East–West Arterial Road (Stafford Road), Everton Park
- Length: 0.6 km (0.37 mi; 2,000 ft)

Everton Park Link Road is a state-controlled road (number unknown). It runs from the Western Arterial Road (South Pine Road) in Everton Park to East–West Arterial Road (Stafford Road) in Everton Park, a distance of 0.6 kilometres (0.37 mi). It has no intersecting roads.

It was constructed in 2021 at a cost of $31 million to reduce congestion at the Stafford Road and South Pine Road intersection.

=== East–West Arterial Road ===
East–West Arterial Road
- Location: Airport Drive, Brisbane Airport to Western Arterial Road (South Pine Road), Everton Park
- Length: 9.9 km (6.2 mi)
- Route number: 5

East–West Arterial Road is a state-controlled regional road (number U19). It runs from Airport Drive in Brisbane Airport to the Western Arterial Road (South Pine Road) in Everton Park, a distance of 9.9 kilometres (6.2 mi). The road follows a circuitous route, part of State Route 20, from Clayfield to Kedron to bypass the Airport Link tunnel. It intersects with Southern Cross Way in Brisbane Airport, Sandgate Sub–Arterial Road (Sandgate Road) in Clayfield, the Airport Link tunnel in Clayfield and Kedron, Gympie Arterial Road (Gympie Road) in Kedron, and Everton Park Link Road in Everton Park.

=== Everton Park–Albany Creek Road ===
Everton Park–Albany Creek Road (Old Northern Road)
- Location: Western Arterial Road, Everton Park to South Pine Road, Albany Creek
- Length: 6.9 km (4.3 mi)

Everton Park–Albany Creek Road (Old Northern Road) is a state-controlled district road (number 900). It runs from the Western Arterial Road (South Pine Road (Road 1)) in Everton Park to South Pine Road (Road 2) in Albany Creek, a distance of 6.9 kilometres (4.3 mi). It has no intersections with other state-controlled roads.

== Intersecting state-controlled roads (Road 2) ==
The following state-controlled roads intersect with Road 2:

- Everton Park–Albany Creek Road (see above)
- Strathpine–Samford Road

=== Strathpine–Samford Road ===
Strathpine–Samford Road (Eatons Crossing Road)
- Location: South Pine Road, Eatons Hill to Samford Road, Samford
- Length: 12.8 km (8.0 mi)

Strathpine–Samford Road (Eatons Crossing Road) is a state-controlled district road (number 4032), rated as a local road of regional significance (LRRS). It runs from South Pine Road (Road 2) in Eatons Hill to Samford Road in Samford, a distance of 12.8 kilometres (8.0 mi). It has no intersections with other state-controlled roads, but it does intersect with Lilley Road, Clear Mountain Road and Bunya Road. It runs concurrent with Mount Samson Road (State Route 22) from Yugar to Samford.

A project to improve intersection and route safety on this road, at an estimated cost of $75.2 million, was under construction in December 2023, with an estimated completion date of mid-2025.

== See also ==
- List of numbered roads in Queensland
