= Highvale, Queensland =

Highvale Moreton Bay City, Queensland
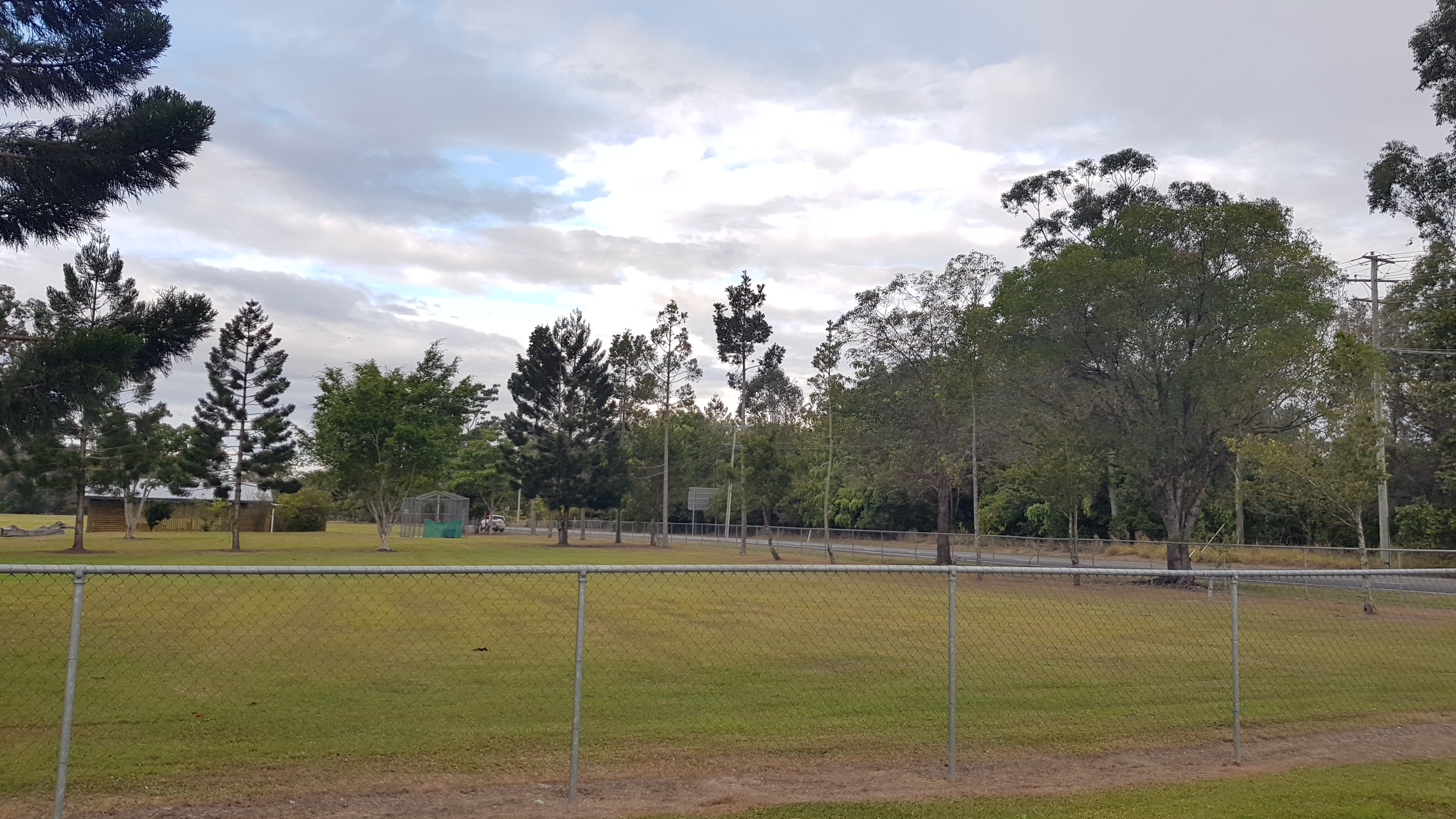
- Edward Louden Park, 2023

- Coordinates: 27.3736°S 152.8119°E
- Population: 1,979 (2021 census)
  - Density: 80.78/km^{2} (209.2/sq mi)
- Postcode(s): 4520
- Area: 24.5 km^{2} (9.5 sq mi)
- Time zone: AEST (UTC+10:00)
- Location: 7.9 km (5 mi) W of Samford Village; 16.6 km (10 mi) WNW of Ferny Grove; 26.0 km (16 mi) WSW of Strathpine; 30.2 km (19 mi) NW of Brisbane CBD
- LGA(s): City of Moreton Bay
- State electorate(s): Pine Rivers
- Federal division(s): Dickson
Suburbs around Highvale:
Mount Glorious	Cedar Creek	Cedar Creek
Mount Nebo	Highvale	Samford Valley
Enoggera Reservoir	Jollys Lookout	Wights Mountain

Highvale is a rural residential locality in the City of Moreton Bay, Queensland, Australia. In the 2021 census, Highvale had a population of 1,979 people.

== Geography ==
The area is the headwaters of the South Pine River. In the north and west of the locality the elevation rises to heights greater than 500 m above sea level along the D'Aguilar Range. Highvale is positioned at the base of Mount Nebo and Mount Glorious.

The land use is a mix of rural residential living and grazing on native vegetation. Most of the land on the steep slopes of the D'Aguilar Range is not used.

== History ==
The locality was originally called Highlands after a property called "The Highlands", developed as a model dairy farm. It was bought in 1919 by Queensland Government to develop as banana farms for a soldier settlement. In 1924 the Postmaster-General's Department wanted to erect a telephone line to the area but objected to the name Highlands as there was already another place with that name and Highvale was chosen as the replacement.

Highlands State School opened on 7 February 1921. It was renamed Highvale State School in 1943. It closed on 29 January 1968. The school was at 876 Mount Glorious Road (27.3785°S 152.8078°E).

In 2015, the Samford Area Mens Shed opened at the entrance to the show grounds.

== Demographics ==
In the 2011 census, Highvale recorded a population of 1,545 people, 50.2% female and 49.8% male. The median age of the Highvale population was 40 years, 3 years above the national median of 37. 75.5% of people living in Highvale were born in Australia. The other top responses for country of birth were England 10.4%, New Zealand 3.4%, South Africa 1.2%, Germany 0.6%, Netherlands 0.5%. 93.4% of people spoke only English at home; the next most common languages were 0.6% Hungarian, 0.6% Italian, 0.4% German, 0.3% Japanese, 0.3% Thai.

In the 2016 census, Highvale had a population of 1,766 people.

In the 2021 census, Highvale had a population of 1,979 people.

== Education ==
There are no schools in Highvale. The nearest government primary schools are Samford State School in Samford Village to the east and Mount Nebo State School in neighbouring Mount Nebo to the west. The nearest government secondary school is Ferny Grove State High School at Ferny Grove to the south-east.

== Amenities ==
Highvale is home to an active horse riding community with local tracks and many horse-centric events occurring annually, including riding for the disabled.

Despite the name, the Samford Showground is in Highvale. Also known as Denis Goodwin Reserve, it is at 40 Showgrounds Drive (27.36976°S 152.82072°E).

Highvale has an active Baháʼí Faith community, which offers children's classes in the local village aimed at increasing youth involvement in the community as well as spiritual growth and self-awareness.

== Events ==
The Samford Show is held annually in July at the Samford Show grounds.
