= Closeburn, Queensland =

Closeburn Queensland
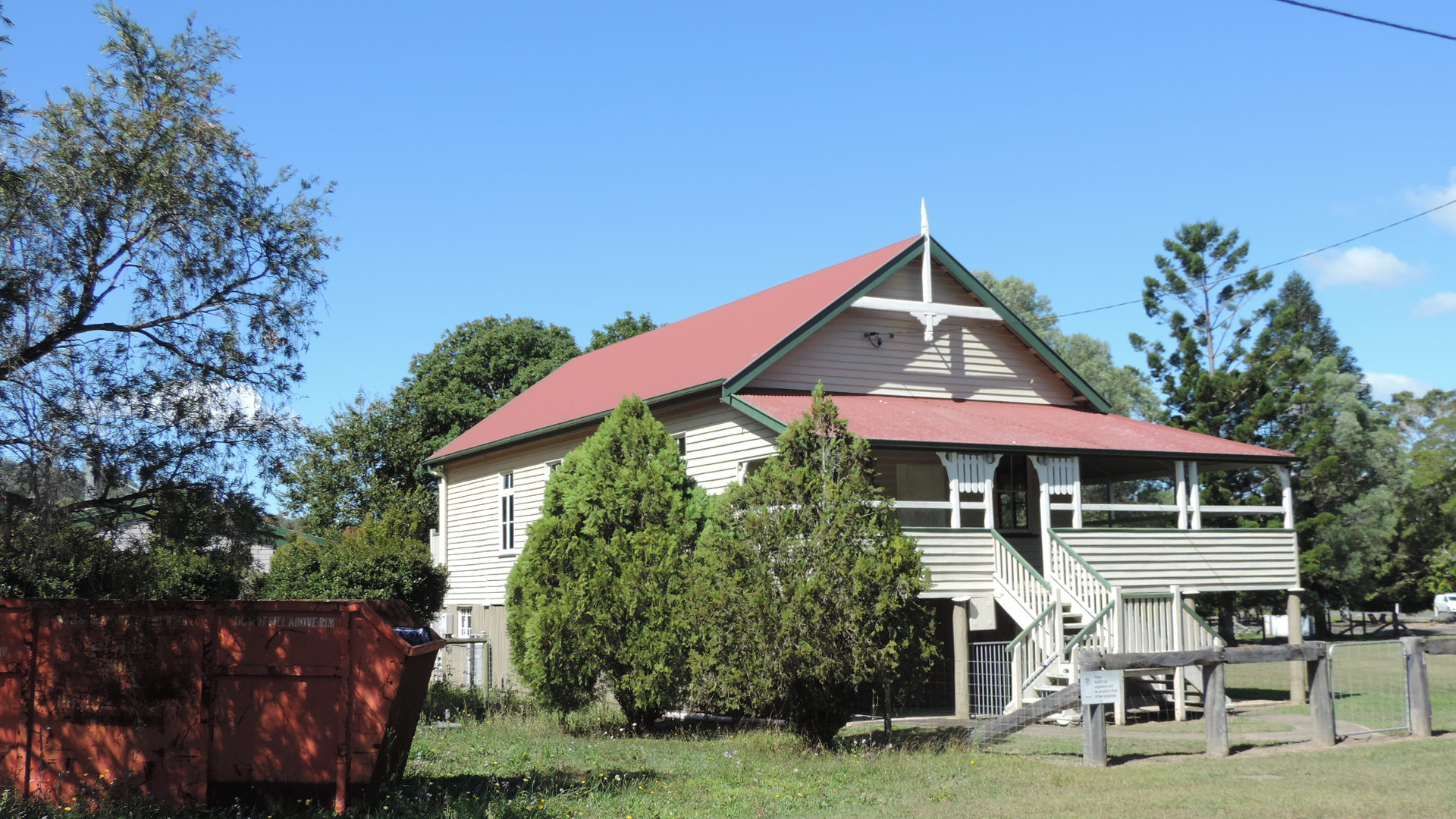
- Cedar Creek Public Hall, Closeburn, 2020

- Coordinates: 27.3277°S 152.8675°E
- Population: 562 (2021 census)
  - Density: 49.30/km^{2} (127.7/sq mi)
- Postcode(s): 4520
- Area: 11.4 km^{2} (4.4 sq mi)
- Time zone: AEST (UTC+10:00)
- Location: 7.7 km (5 mi) NNE of Samford Village; 14.2 km (9 mi) NNW of Ferny Grove; 18.6 km (12 mi) WSW of Strathpine; 29.2 km (18 mi) NW of Brisbane CBD
- LGA(s): City of Moreton Bay
- State electorate(s): Pine Rivers
- Federal division(s): Dickson
Suburbs around Closeburn:
Mount Samson	Clear Mountain	Clear Mountain
Cedar Creek	Closeburn	Draper
Cedar Creek	Yugar	Yugar

Closeburn is a rural locality in the City of Moreton Bay, Queensland, Australia. In the 2021 census, Closeburn had a population of 562 people.

== Geography ==
Closeburn is part of the wider Samford valley. It is roughly 28 kilometres (17 mi) north-west of Brisbane.

Closeburn is a blend of acreage properties and small farms. Access to Closeburn from Brisbane is along Samford Road and Mount Samson Road.

The watercourse Cedar Creek enters the locality from the west (the locality of Cedar Creek) and exits to the south-east and east (Yugar / Draper / Clear Mountain).

== History ==
Originally known as Cedar Creek for the creek that runs through it, the locality takes its present name from the Closeburn railway station, which was named by the Queensland Railways Department on 4 February 1901, reportedly after the town of Closeburn in Dumfries and Galloway, Scotland.

Closeburn State School (sometimes written as Close Burn State School) opened on 29 January 1920 and closed in 1967. It was at 353 Cedar Creek Road (27.3410°S 152.8349°E).

The Cedar Creek Public Hall opened in 1925.

== Demographics ==
In the 2011 census, Closeburn recorded a population of 507 people, 49.5% female and 50.5% male. The median age of the Closeburn population was 37 years, the same as the national median. 80.7% of people living in Closeburn were born in Australia. The other top responses for country of birth were England 7.9%, New Zealand 2%, South Africa 1.2%, Finland 1%, Croatia 1%. 95.5% of people spoke only English at home; the next most common languages were 1.2% Afrikaans, 0.8% Finnish, 0.6% Tagalog, 0.6% Italian.

In the 2016 census, Closeburn had a population of 594 people.

In the 2021 census, Closeburn had a population of 562 people.

== Facilities ==
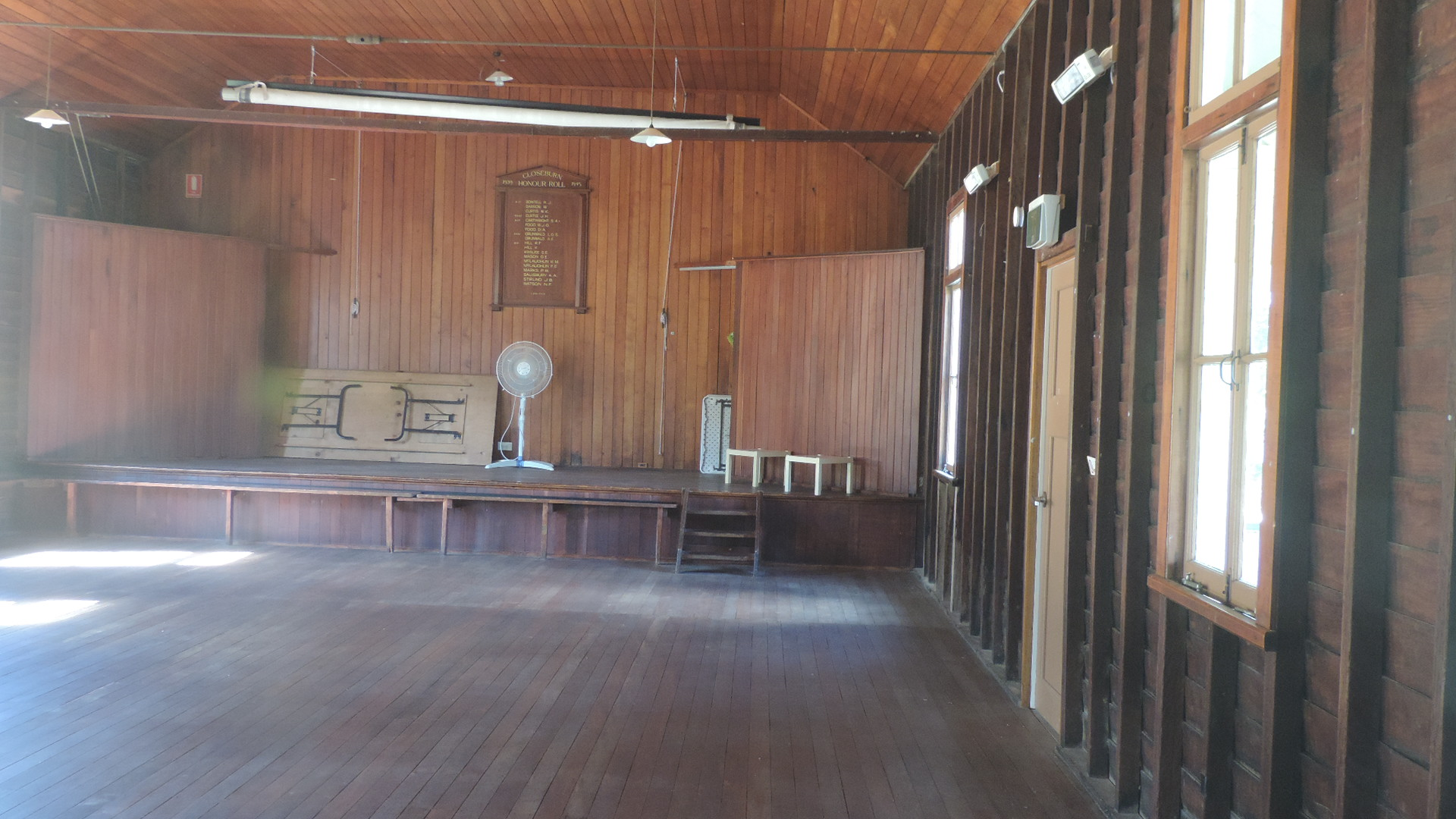
Interior of the Cedar Creek Public Hall with World War II Honour Roll, 2020

Closeburn contains:

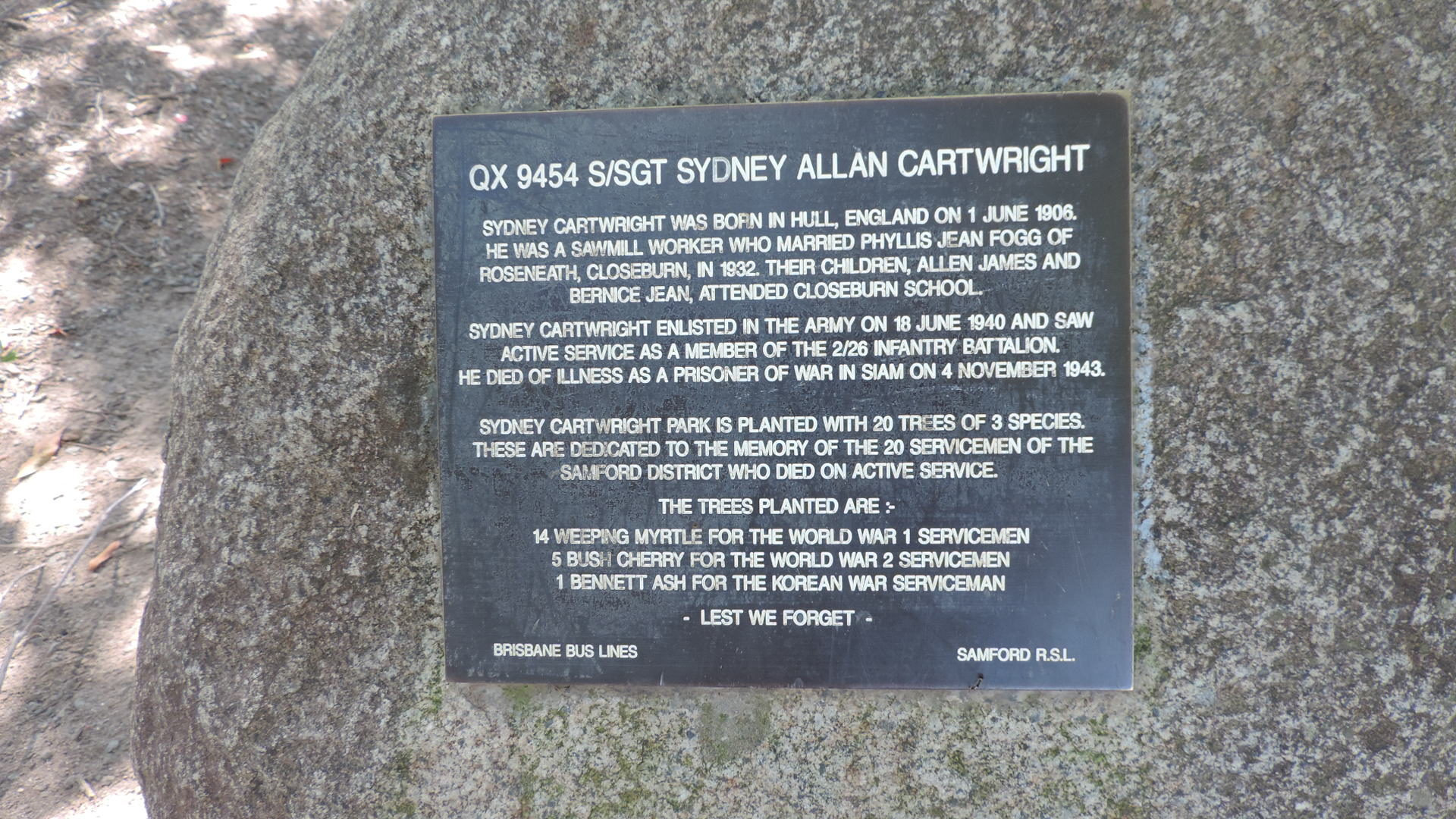
Memorial to soldier Sydney Allan Cartwright in Sydney Cartwright Park, Closeburn, 2020

- Cedar Creek Public Hall at 2 Andrew Road (27.3257°S 152.8648°E) containing the Closeburn Honour Roll for World War II
- a Telstra exchange; as such households in the area are able to obtain ADSL or ADSL2+ access,
- Closeburn rural fire brigade at 8 Andrew Road (27.3253°S 152.8658°E)

Sydney Cartwright Park on Andrew Road (27.3266°S 152.8657°E) between has a memorial to soldier Sydney Allan Cartwright who died as a prisoner of war in World War II in Siam.

== Education ==
There are no schools in Closeburn. The nearest government primary schools are Mount Samson State School in neighbouring Mount Samson to the north-west and Samford State School in Samford Village to the south-east. The nearest government secondary school is Ferny Grove State High School in Ferny Grove to the south-east.
