= Ferny Grove =

Ferny Grove could refer to:

- Ferny Grove, Queensland, a suburb of Brisbane in Australia
  - Ferny Grove railway line
  - Ferny Grove railway station
  - Ferny Grove State High School
- Electoral district of Ferny Grove
