= Cashmere, Queensland =

Cashmere
- Suburb
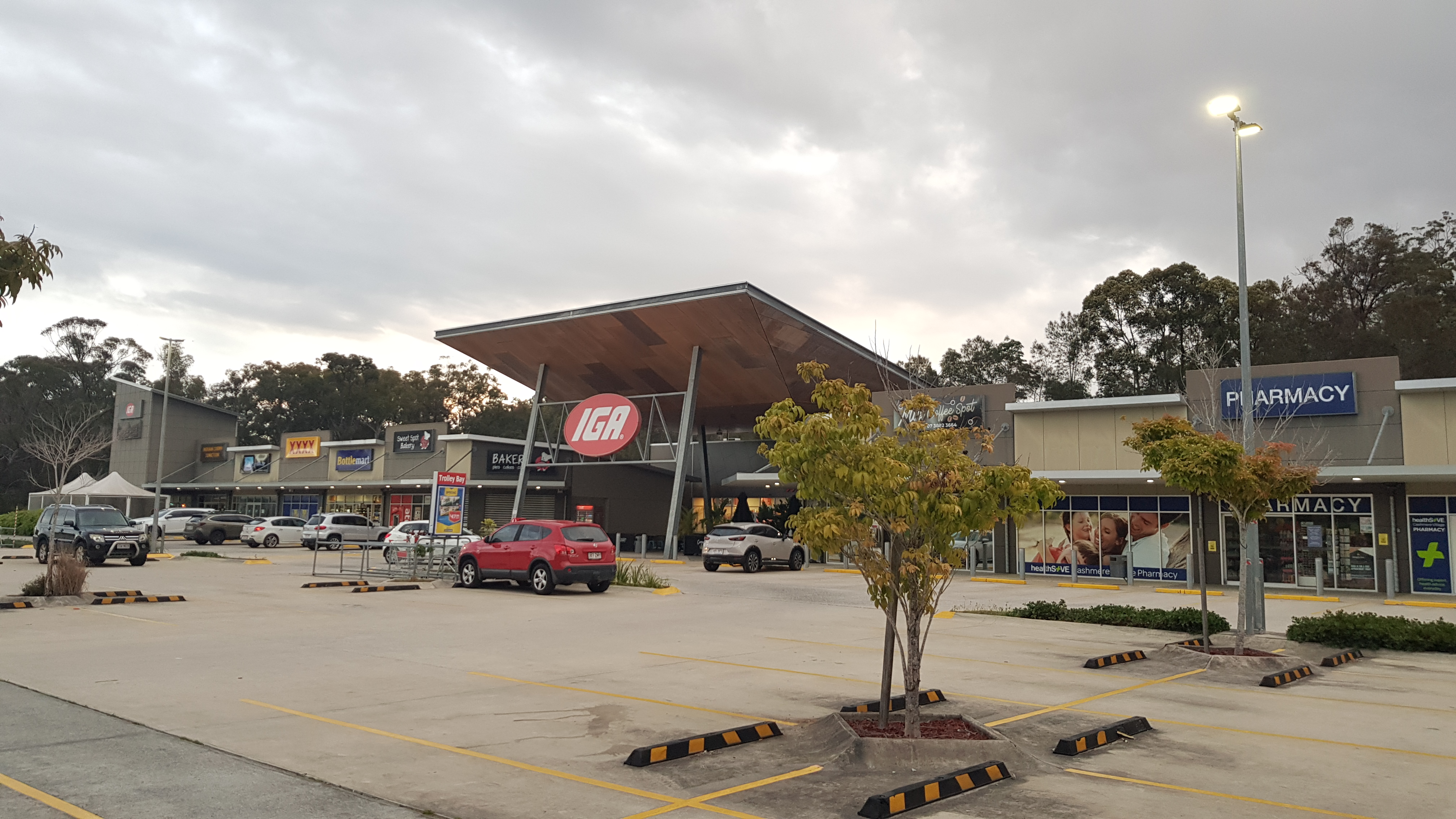
- Cashmere Village Shopping Centre, 2023

- Interactive map of Cashmere
- Coordinates: 27.2933°S 152.9030°E
- Country: Australia
- State: Queensland
- City: Moreton Bay
- LGA: City of Moreton Bay
- Location: 8.2 km (5.1 mi) W of Strathpine; 27.1 km (16.8 mi) NNW of Brisbane CBD

Government
  - State electorate: Pine Rivers
  - Federal division: Dickson

Area
  - Total: 34.6 km^{2} (13.4 sq mi)

Population
  - Total: 4,970 (2021 census)
  - Density: 143.6/km^{2} (372.0/sq mi)
- Time zone: UTC+10:00 (AEST)
- Postcode: 4500
Suburbs around Cashmere
Samsonvale	Whiteside	Joyner
Mount Samson	Cashmere	Warner
Clear Mountain	Clear Mountain	Eatons Hill

Cashmere is a suburb in the City of Moreton Bay, Queensland, Australia. In the 2021 census, Cashmere had a population of 4,970 people.

== Geography ==
Cashmere is bounded to the north by Lake Samsonvale (27.2666°S 152.8833°E). It is a reservoir created by the North Pine Dam, which impounds the North Pine River.

Cashmere is near the foothills of the D'Aguilar Range surrounded by dense forest.

== History ==
The origin of the suburb name is from an early property owner by the name of James Cash.

== Demographics ==
In the 2011 census, Cashmere had a population of 4,651 people, 49.7% female and 50.3% male. The median age of the Cashmere population was 35 years, 2 years below the national median of 37. 77.3% of people living in Cashmere were born in Australia. The other top responses for country of birth were England 7.2%, New Zealand 3.6%, South Africa 3.1%, Scotland 0.7%, Germany 0.6%. 94.2% of people spoke only English at home; the next most common languages were 1% Afrikaans, 0.4% German, 0.4% Italian, 0.3% Hindi, 0.2% French.

In the 2016 census, Cashmere had a population of 4,920 people.

In the 2021 census, Cashmere had a population of 4,970 people.

== Education ==
There are no schools in Cashmere. The nearest government primary schools are:

- Bray Park State School in Bray Park to the east
- Strathpine West State School in Strathpine to the east
- Eatons Hill State School in neighbouring Eatons Hill to the south-east
- Mount Samson State School in neighbouring Mount Samson to the west

The nearest government secondary schools are Bray Park State High School in Bray Park to the east and Albany Creek State High School in Albany Creek to the south-east.

== Amenities ==
There are a number of parks in the area:

- Jan Sked Reserve (27.3022°S 152.9261°E)
- Ogle Park (27.3162°S 152.9315°E)
- One Mile Park (27.2904°S 152.9372°E)
- Raymont Reserve (27.2923°S 152.9300°E)
