= Yugar, Queensland =

Yugar
- Suburb
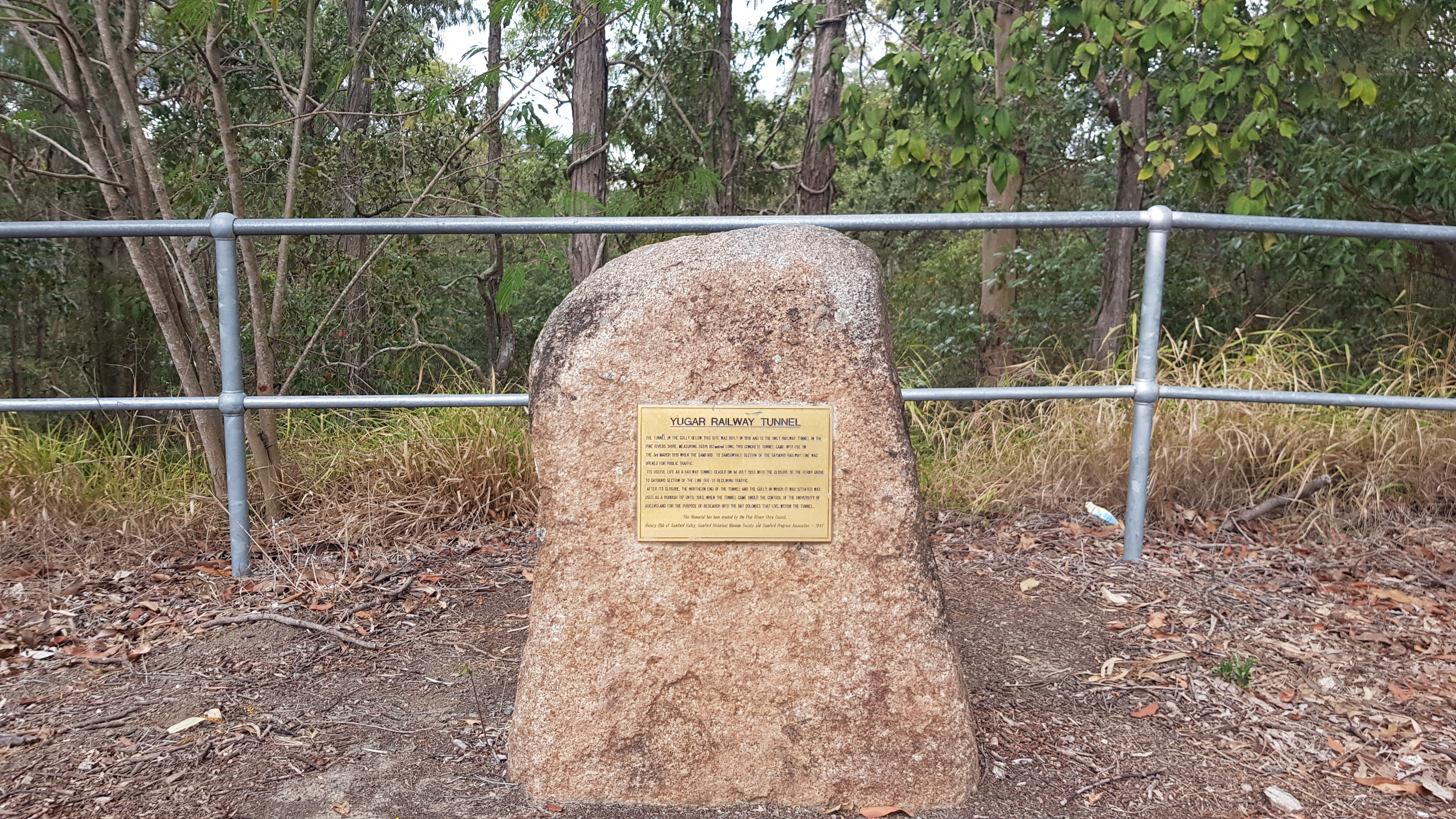
- Yugar Train Tunnel Memorial, 2023

- Interactive map of Yugar
- Coordinates: 27.3447°S 152.8694°E
- Country: Australia
- State: Queensland
- LGA: City of Moreton Bay
- Location: 5.7 km (3.5 mi) NW of Samford Village; 12.2 km (7.6 mi) NW of Ferny Grove; 16.6 km (10.3 mi) WSW of Strathpine; 25.9 km (16.1 mi) NW of Brisbane CBD

Government
  - State electorate: Pine Rivers
  - Federal division: Dickson

Area
  - Total: 4.9 km^{2} (1.9 sq mi)

Population
  - Total: 406 (2021 census)
  - Density: 82.9/km^{2} (214.6/sq mi)
- Time zone: UTC+10:00 (AEST)
- Postcode: 4520
Suburbs around Yugar
Closeburn	Closeburn	Closeburn
Cedar Creek	Yugar	Draper
Samford Valley	Samford Valley	Samford Valley

Yugar is a rural locality in the City of Moreton Bay, Queensland, Australia. In the 2021 census, Yugar had a population of 406 people.

== Geography ==
Yugar is in South East Queensland 20 kilometres (12 mi) from Brisbane.

== History ==
The locality takes its name from the Yugar railway station, which in turn was named on 12 January 1917 by the Queensland Railways Department, using a Yuggera language (Yugarabul dialect) word yugai referring to a type of fern.

Parker Provisional School opened on 15 August 1904. On 1 January 1909 it became Parker State School. It closed 9 March 1945. It was at 1826 Mount Samson Road (27.3354°S 152.8712°E). The name Parker refers to the name of the parish.

On Sunday 8 June 1913, Ernest Austin raped and murdered 11-year-old Ivy Alexandra Mitchell in bushland near the Parker State School. He was executed by hanging at Boggo Road Gaol on Monday 22 September 1913. He was the last person to be executed in Queensland.

== Demographics ==
In the 2011 census, Yugar had a population of 395 people, 47.1% female and 52.9% male. The median age of the Yugar population was 43 years, 6 years above the national median of 37. 77.2% of people living in Yugar were born in Australia. The other top responses for country of birth were England 5.6%, New Zealand 5.1%, Thailand 1%, Malawi 1%, Kenya 1%. 92.6% of people spoke only English at home; the next most common languages were 1.3% Mandarin.

In the 2016 census, Yugar had a population of 385 people.

In the 2021 census, Yugar had a population of 406 people.

== Education ==
There are no schools in Yugar. The nearest government primary school is Samford State School in Samford Village to the south-east. The nearest government secondary school is Ferny Grove State High School in Ferny Grove to the south-east.

== Attractions ==
The Yugar Train Tunnel Memorial marks the location of the railway tunnel on the former Dayboro railway line, which closed in 1955. The tunnel still exists and is used by the University of Queensland to research the rare bent-wing bat colony that lives within it. Public access to the tunnel is not permitted. The memorial is at the southern corner of McDowalls Road and Mount Sampson Road (27.34528°S 152.87410°E).
