= Mount Samson, Queensland =

Mount Samson
- Suburb
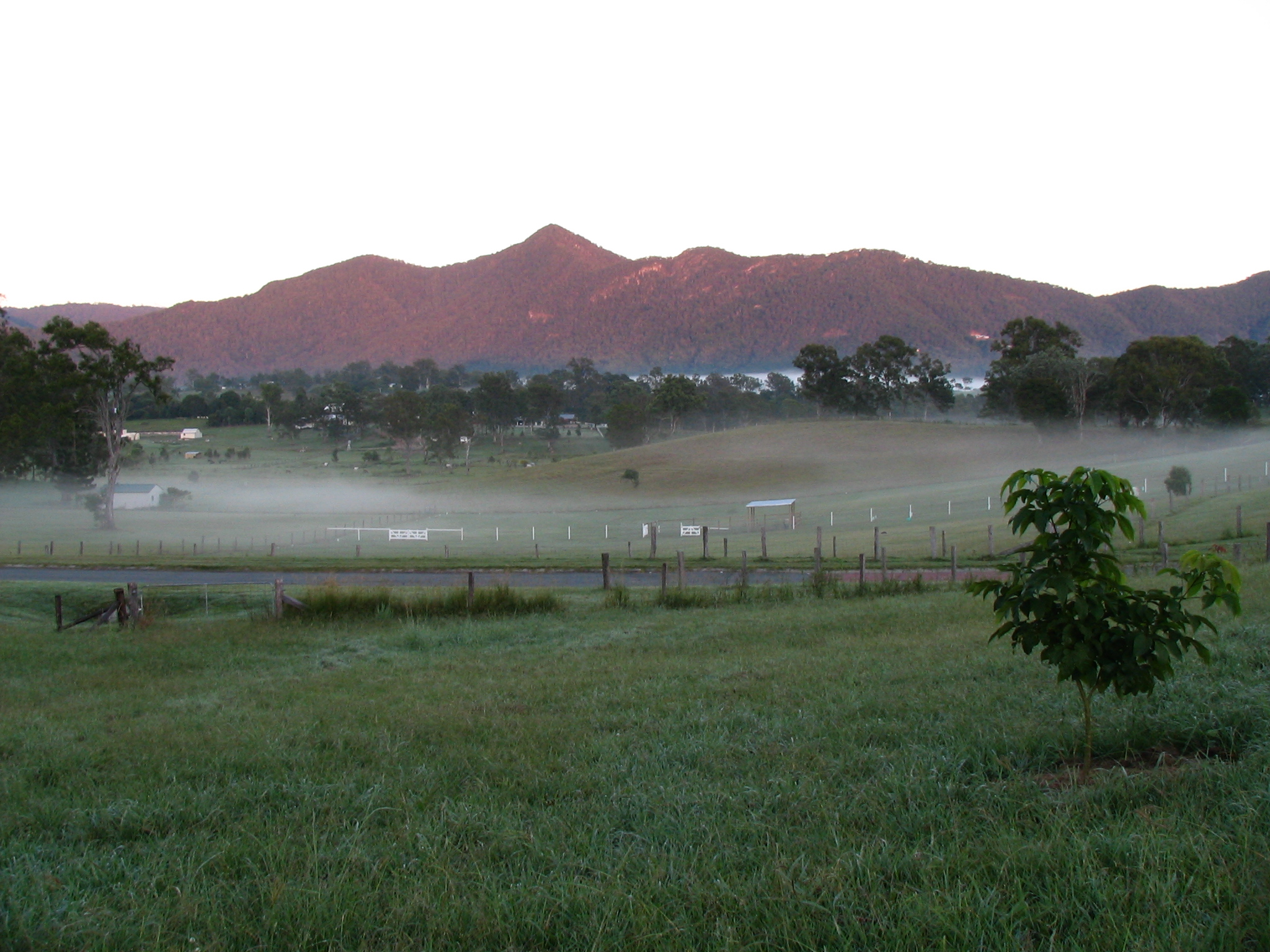

- Interactive map of Mount Samson
- Coordinates: 27.3005°S 152.8405°E
- Country: Australia
- State: Queensland
- LGA: City of Moreton Bay
- Location: 19.9 km (12.4 mi) W of Strathpine; 33.8 km (21.0 mi) NW of Brisbane CBD

Government
  - State electorate: Pine Rivers
  - Federal division: Dickson

Area
  - Total: 18.4 km^{2} (7.1 sq mi)

Population
  - Total: 625 (2021 census)
  - Density: 33.97/km^{2} (87.98/sq mi)
- Time zone: UTC+10:00 (AEST)
- Postcode: 4520
Suburbs around Mount Samson
| Samsonvale | Samsonvale | Cashmere |
| Mount Glorious | Mount Samson | Clear Mountain |
| Cedar Creek | Cedar Creek | Closeburn |

Mount Samson is a rural locality in the City of Moreton Bay, Queensland, Australia. In the 2021 census, Mount Samson had a population of 625 people.

== Geography ==
Mount Samson is about halfway between Samford and Dayboro located in South East Queensland. It is roughly 34 kilometres (21 mi) north west of Brisbane.

Mount Samson is a mix of acreage properties and small farms. The area was most recently dominated by agriculture such as dairy farming. Access to Mount Samson from Brisbane is along Samford Road and Mount Samson Road.

== History ==
Mt Samson was occupied by the indigenous people who named it Buran (Boorun), which means wind.

The suburb takes its name from the reasonably dominant Mount Samson which is part of the D'Aguilar Range.

Samson Creek Provisional School opened on 9 August 1880. On 1 October 1909, it became Samson Creek State School. In 1925, the school was moved and renamed Mount Samson State School.

Mount Samson was connected to Brisbane by a train service from 1919 to 1955. The station was sited on land adjoining the current location of Samsonvale Hall.

An annual music festival, Red Deer Festival, was held in Mount Samson from 2009 to 2017.

== Demographics ==
In the 2011 census, Mount Samson recorded a population of 566 people, 49.8% female and 50.2% male. The median age of the Mount Samson population was 38 years, 1 year above the national median of 37. 77.5% of people living in Mount Samson were born in Australia. The other top responses for country of birth were England 9.8%, New Zealand 3%, Germany 0.5%, Canada 0.5%, Ireland 0.5%. 95.8% of people spoke only English at home; the next most common languages were 0.9% Greek, 0.7% Mandarin, 0% Welsh, 0% Irish, 0% Gaelic (Scotland).

In the 2016 census, Mount Samson had a population of 594 people.

In the 2021 census, Mount Samson had a population of 625 people.

== Climate ==
Mount Samson has a sub-tropical climate with very hot humid summers and mild, dry, sunny winters. Most rain falls during the height of summer, between November and February. Whilst summer maximum average temperatures generally linger around 30C, the summer months, like most of South East Queensland have some extremely hot days, sometimes as high as 40C.

== Facilities ==
Samsonvale Hall is located on Winn Road on the opposite side from the primary school.

The Moreton Bay City Council operates a mobile library service which visits the Mount Samson State School on Winn Road.

== Education ==
Mount Samson State School is a government primary (Prep-6) school for boys and girls at 1060 Winn Road (27.2943°S 152.8512°E). In 2017, the school had an enrolment of 313 students with 26 teachers (20 full-time equivalent) and 16 non-teaching staff (9 full-time equivalent). It includes a special education program.

There are no secondary schools in Mount Samson. The nearest government secondary schools are Bray Park State High School in Bray Park to the east and Ferny Grove State High School in Ferny Grove to the south-east.
