= Mount Glorious =

Mount Glorious Queensland
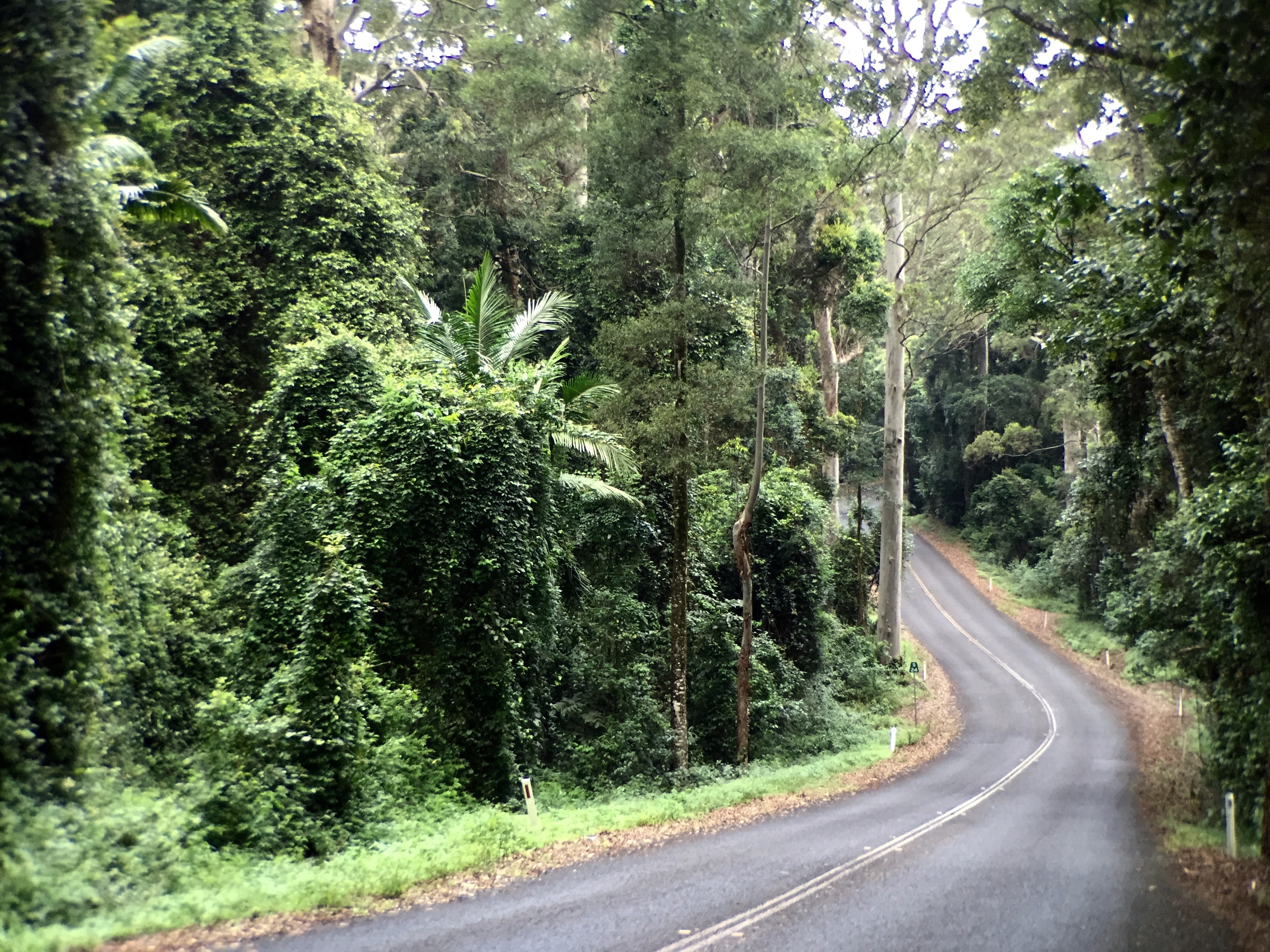
- Following the mountain's ridge on Mount Glorious Road through D'Aguilar National Park, 2016

- Coordinates: 27.3227°S 152.7825°E
- Population: 343 (2021 census)
  - Density: 16.65/km^{2} (43.12/sq mi)
- Established: 1903
- Postcode(s): 4520
- Area: 20.6 km^{2} (8.0 sq mi)
- Time zone: AEST (UTC+10:00)
- Location: 35.0 km (22 mi) W of Strathpine; 41.1 km (26 mi) NW of Brisbane CBD
- LGA(s): City of Moreton Bay
- State electorate(s): Pine Rivers
- Federal division(s): Dickson
Suburbs around Mount Glorious:
| Laceys Creek | Kobble Creek | Samsonvale |
| Dundas | Mount Glorious | Mount Samson; Cedar Creek |
| England Creek | Mount Nebo | Highvale |

Mount Glorious is a rural locality in the City of Moreton Bay, Queensland, Australia. In the 2021 census, Mount Glorious had a population of 343 people.

== Geography ==
Mount Glorious is a mountain which is part of the D'Aguilar Range and is a suburb in City of Moreton Bay. It is 41.1 kilometres (25.5 mi) by road north-west of the Brisbane CBD. The forest that surrounds the mountain village is part of Brisbane Forest Park and the D'Aguilar National Park.

The locality has the following mountains (from north to south):

- Mount Samson (27.3025°S 152.8012°E) 690 metres (2,260 ft)
- Mount D'Aguilar (27.3036°S 152.7709°E) 742 metres (2,434 ft)
- Mount Glorious (27.3350°S 152.7678°E) 619 metres (2,031 ft)

Other mountains in the D'Aguilar Range (but not in this locality) include Mount Nebo, Mount Pleasant and Mount Mee.

== History ==
The locality name takes its name from the mountain, which was named as the result of a random remark by Elizabeth Patrick at a 1915 picnic, when she commented on the view.

Five blocks on the mountain were made available early in the 20th century, with the first block being bought by James O'Hara in 1903. In 1921, a real estate map advertised 31 blocks as 'Crest Estate : the first section', being subdivisions of Portion 9, Parish of Parker.

The mountain was the centre of a 4.4 magnitude earthquake in November 1960.

== Demographics ==
In the 2016 census, Mount Glorious recorded a population of 296 people, 48.6% female and 51.4% male. The median age of the Mount Glorious population was 49 years, 11 years above the national median of 38. 69.4% of people living in Mount Glorious were born in Australia. The other top responses for country of birth were England 9.3%, New Zealand 4.5%, Netherlands 1.0%, Italy 1.0% and India 1.0%. 88.0% of people spoke only English at home; the next most common languages were Dutch 1.0%, and Sinhalese 1.0%

In the 2021 census, Mount Glorious had a population of 343 people.

== Education ==
There are no schools in Mount Glorious. The nearest government primary schools are Mount Samson State School in neighbouring Mount Samson to the north-east and Mount Nebo State School in neighbouring Mount Nebo to the south. The nearest government secondary school is Ferny Grove State High School in Ferny Grove to the south-east.

== Amenities ==
The Moreton Bay City Council operates a mobile library service which visits the Mount Glorious Hall on Mount Glorious Road.

== See also ==
- List of mountains in Australia
