= Cedar Creek, Queensland =

Cedar Creek, Queensland may refer to:

- Cedar Creek, Queensland (Logan & Gold Coast)
- Cedar Creek, Queensland (Moreton Bay Region)
