= Mount Nebo (Queensland) =

- Suburb
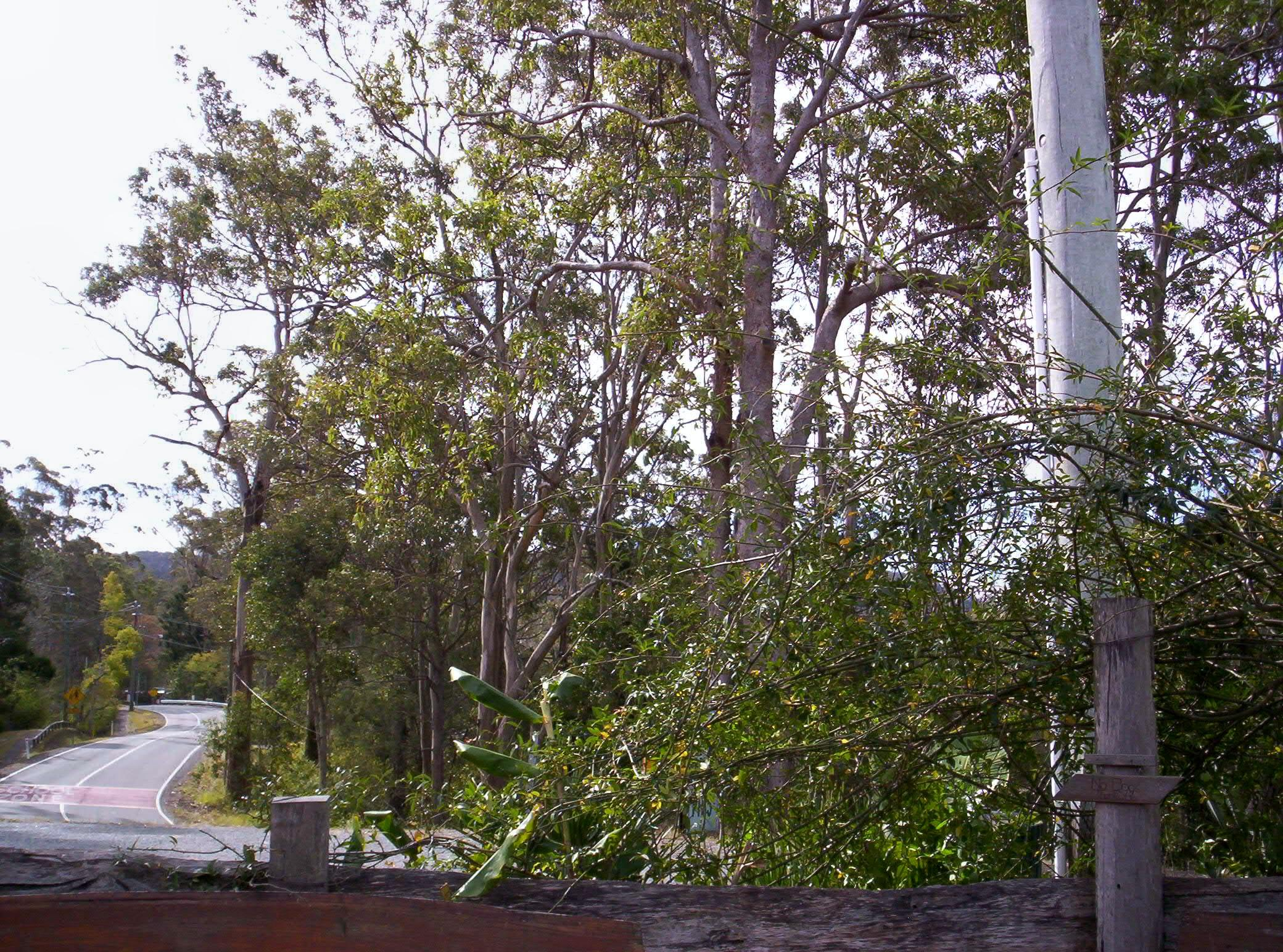
- Mount Nebo, Queensland

- Interactive map of Mount Nebo
- Coordinates: 27.3755°S 152.7811°E
- Country: Australia
- State: Queensland
- LGA: City of Moreton Bay
- Location: 32.6 km (20.3 mi) NW of Brisbane CBD; 40.9 km (25.4 mi) SW of Strathpine
- Established: 1919

Government
  - State electorate: Pine Rivers
  - Federal division: Dickson

Area
  - Total: 14.4 km^{2} (5.6 sq mi)

Population
  - Total: 430 (2021 census)
  - Density: 29.9/km^{2} (77.3/sq mi)
- Time zone: UTC+10:00 (AEST)
- Postcode: 4520
Suburbs around Mount Nebo
England Creek	Mount Glorious	Highvale
Banks Creek	Mount Nebo	Highvale
Lake Manchester	Lake Manchester	Enoggera Reservoir

Mount Nebo is a rural locality in the City of Moreton Bay, Queensland, Australia. In the 2021 census, Mount Nebo had a population of 430 people.

== Geography ==
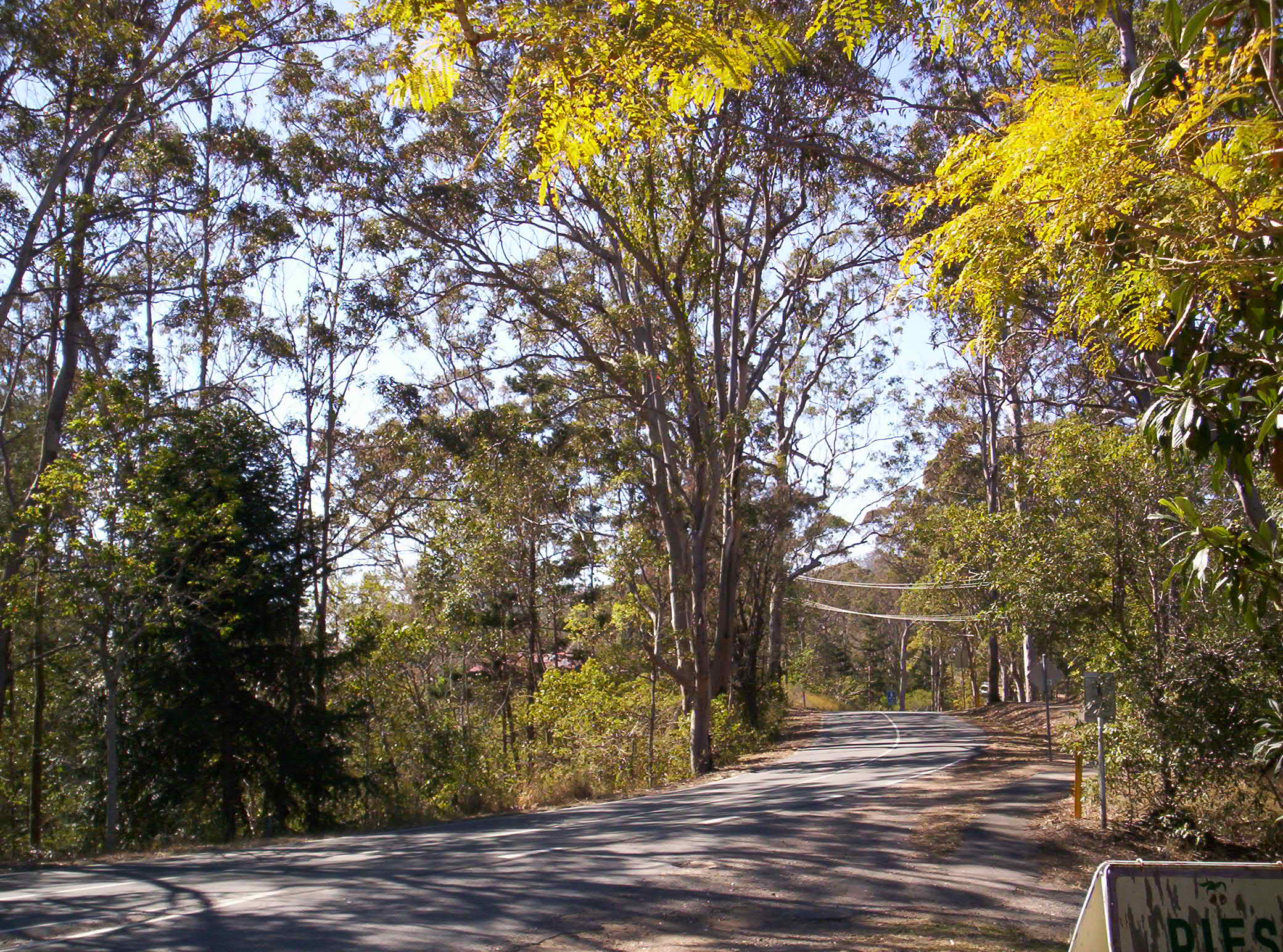
Mount Nebo, Queensland

Mount Nebo is a mountain (27.3776°S 152.7906°E) rising to 617 metres (2,024 ft) above sea level. It is approximately 18 kilometres (11 mi) north-west of the Brisbane suburb of The Gap in Queensland, Australia.

It is part of the D'Aguilar Range which includes other mountains such as Mount Pleasant, Mount Glorious and Mount Mee.

The land use is predominantly rural residential housing in the south of the locality, while the rest of the locality is within the protected area of D'Aguilar National Park.

== History ==
The locality of Mount Nebo is named after the mountain on which it is located.

European settlement began in 1919 with the subdivision of the Highlands Estate into smaller blocks for soldiers returning from World War I. For a number of years the community belonged to the Shire of Esk, but between 1932 and 1936 a redrawing of the boundaries brought Mount Nebo into the Shire of Pine Rivers. The 2008 amalgamation of local councils means it now falls within the City of Moreton Bay.

Mount Nebo State School opened on 16 February 1931. The school had a number of temporary closures from 31 December 1934 to 11 April 1939, from 30 September 1940 to 23 October 1940, 18 August 1941 to 19 August 1946 and 5 November 1948 to 21 June 1954.

== Demographics ==
In the 2011 census, Mount Nebo recorded a population of 433 people, 50.3% female and 49.7% male. The median age of the Mount Nebo population was 42 years, 5 years above the national median of 37. 76.6% of people living in Mount Nebo were born in Australia. The other top responses for country of birth were England 11.1%, New Zealand 3.5%, France 1.4%, South Africa 1.2%, United States of America 1.2%. 94.2% of people spoke only English at home; the next most common languages were 1.4% French, 1.2% Dhivehi, 0.7% German, 0.7% Hebrew. The most common religious affiliation was "No Religion" (49.0%); the next most common responses were Catholic 14.3%, Anglican 8.5%, Uniting Church 5.1% and Buddhism 3.5%.

In the 2016 census, Mount Nebo had a population of 424 people.

In the 2021 census, Mount Nebo had a population of 430 people.

== Amenities ==
The Moreton Bay City Council operates a mobile library service which visits the Mount Nebo Community Hall on Mount Nebo Rd fornightly.

== Education ==
Mount Nebo State School is a government primary (Prep-6) school for boys and girls at Mount Nebo Road (27.3965°S 152.7834°E). In 2017, the school had an enrolment of 30 students with 6 teachers (3 full-time equivalent) and 6 non-teaching staff (3 full-time equivalent).

There are no secondary schools in Mount Nebo. The nearest government secondary schools are Ferny Grove State High School in Ferny Grove to the east and The Gap State High School in The Gap to the south-east.
