= Eatons Hill, Queensland =

Eatons Hill
- Suburb
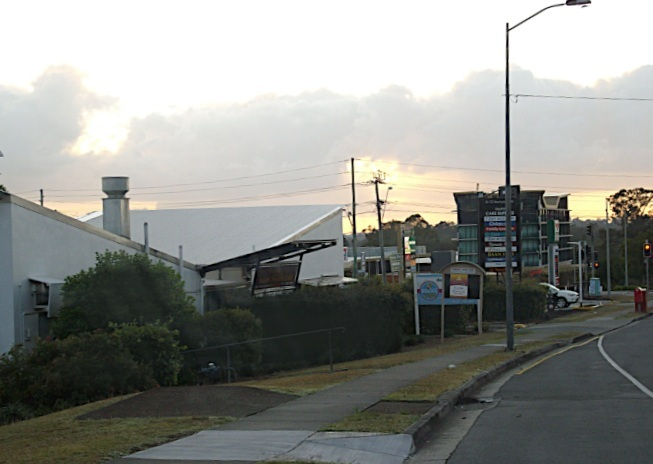
- Bunya Park Drive, Eatons Hill

- Interactive map of Eatons Hill
- Coordinates: 27.3408°S 152.9361°E
- Country: Australia
- State: Queensland
- LGA: City of Moreton Bay
- Location: 8.0 km (5.0 mi) SW of Strathpine; 20.8 km (12.9 mi) NNW of Brisbane CBD

Government
  - State electorate: Everton
  - Federal division: Dickson

Area
  - Total: 8.9 km^{2} (3.4 sq mi)

Population
  - Total: 7,822 (2021 census)
  - Density: 879/km^{2} (2,276/sq mi)
- Time zone: UTC+10:00 (AEST)
- Postcode: 4037
Suburbs around Eatons Hill
Cashmere	Warner	Brendale
Clear Mountain	Eatons Hill	Albany Creek
Draper	Bunya	Albany Creek

Eatons Hill is a suburb in the City of Moreton Bay, Queensland, Australia, located approximately 20 kilometres north-west of Brisbane’s central business district. It is primarily a low-density residential area known for its family-friendly environment, parks, and community facilities. In the 2021 census, Eatons Hill had a population of 7,822 people. Its postcode is 4037.

== Geography ==
South Pine River forms most of the southern boundary of the suburb. Cashs Crossing is a neighbourhood in the east of the suburb (27.3418°S 152.9611°E). It takes its name from the crossing point over the South Pine River and was named after James and Mary Cash, who settled near the crossing point. South Pine Road now crosses the river at that point via a bridge.

Bunya Crossing is another ford across the South Pine River in the south of the locality (27.3529°S 152.9481°E). It takes its name from the Kabi language word "Bonyi" or "Bunyi" referring to the bunya pine (Araucaria bidwillii). It is at the southern end of Bunya Crossing Road and does not have a bridge.

Eatons Hill is in the east of suburb (27.3393°S 152.9566°E) near Cashs Crossing rising to 84 metres (276 ft).

== History ==
Eatons Hill is situated in the Yugarabul traditional Indigenous Australian country.

The area is named after the early pioneer William Eaton, who farmed at Albany Creek from 1874 and was elected as a member of the Pine Shire Council (later renamed Pine Rivers Shire) from 1909 to 1912.

Cashs Crossing at the South Pine River was on the main route from Brisbane to Gympie. In 1891 it was proposed to build a bridge over it. Construction of the bridge had commenced by August 1892. South Pine Bridge was completed in November 1892. It survived the disastrous floods in February 1893 despite three days of great concern.

Residential development began in the early 1970s near the hill situated west of Cash's Crossing where the South Pine Road bridges the river. Eatons Hill generally consists of low-density residential housing with acreage properties in the western portions. Residential development proceeded westward during the late 1990s.

Eatons Hill State School opened on 22 January 1998.

== Demographics ==
In the 2011 census, Eatons Hill recorded a population of 7,993 people, 50.4% female and 49.6% male. The median age of the Eatons Hill population was 34 years, 3 years below the national median of 37. 78.3% of people living in Eatons Hill were born in Australia. The other top responses for country of birth were England 5.6%, New Zealand 3.5%, South Africa 2.2%, Scotland 0.6%, India 0.5%.c 91.6% of people spoke only English at home; the next most common languages were 0.6% Afrikaans, 0.6% Italian, 0.4% Polish, 0.3% German, 0.3% Hindi.

In the 2016 census, Eatons Hill had a population of 7,973 people.

In the 2021 census, Eatons Hill had a population of 7,822 people.

== Education ==
Eatons Hill State School is a government primary (Prep-6) school for boys and girls at Marylin Terrace (27.3354°S 152.9560°E). In 2018, the school had an enrolment of 1,095 students with 79 teachers (68 full-time equivalent) and 41 non-teaching staff (24 full-time equivalent). It includes a special education program.

There are no secondary schools in Eatons Hill. The nearest government secondary school is Albany Creek State High School in neighbouring Albany Creek to the south-east.

== Transport ==
Eatons Hill is serviced by Transport for Brisbane bus routes 357, 358 and 359.

The nearest rail station is Strathpine railway station in Strathpine to the east. It is on the Caboolture railway line.
