= Cedar Creek, Queensland (Moreton Bay) =

Cedar Creek Queensland
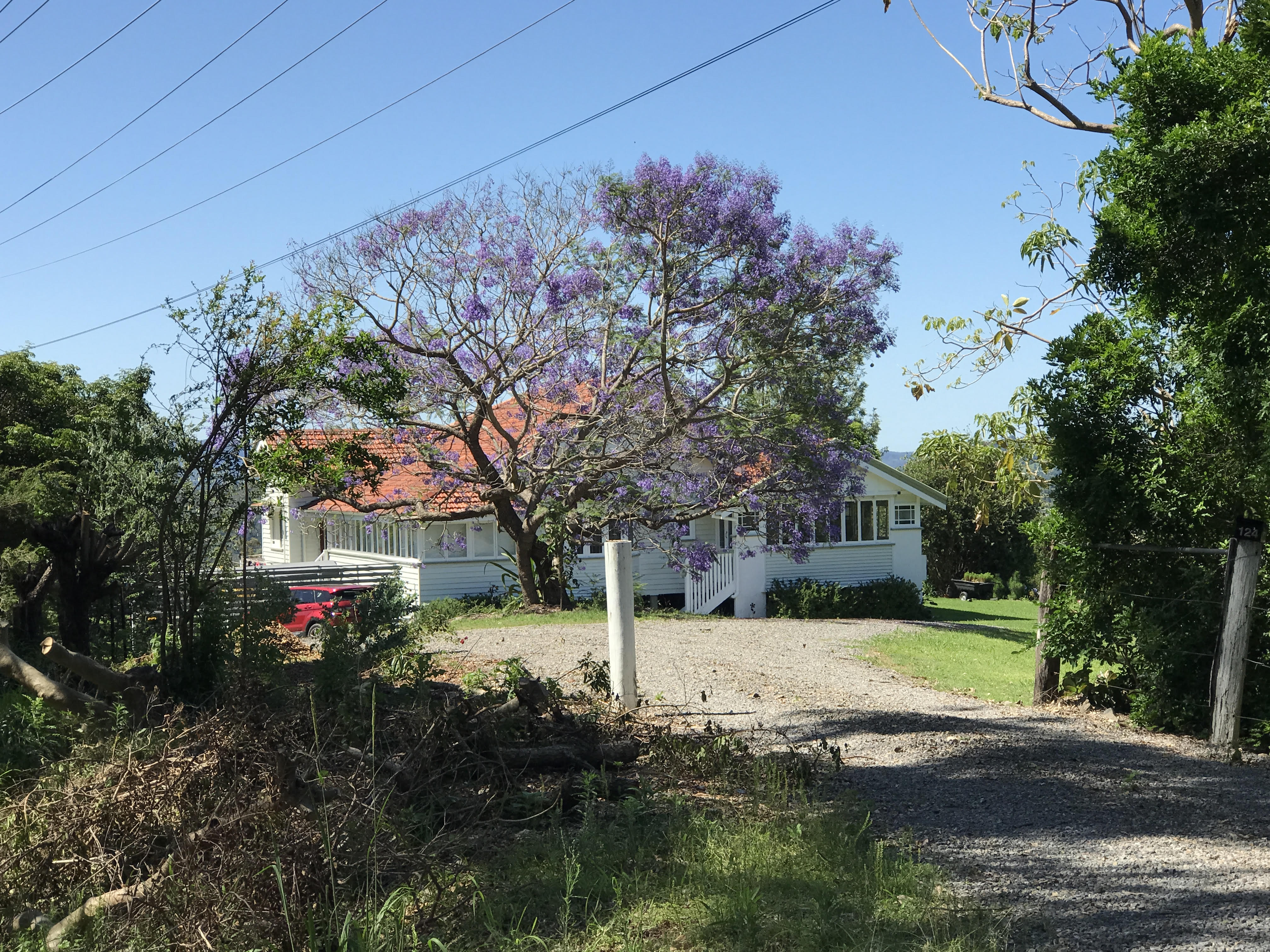
- Farm house, 2022

- Coordinates: 27.3341°S 152.815°E
- Population: 831 (2021 census)
  - Density: 42.84/km^{2} (110.9/sq mi)
- Postcode(s): 4520
- Area: 19.4 km^{2} (7.5 sq mi)
- Time zone: AEST (UTC+10:00)
- Location: 11.2 km (7 mi) NW of Samford Village; 19.4 km (12 mi) NW of Ferny Grove; 23.9 km (15 mi) W of Strathpine; 34.4 km (21 mi) NW of Brisbane CBD
- LGA(s): City of Moreton Bay
- State electorate(s): Pine Rivers
- Federal division(s): Dickson
Suburbs around Cedar Creek:
Mount Glorious	Mount Samson	Mount Samson
Mount Glorious	Cedar Creek	Closeburn; Yugar
Highvale	Highvale	Samford Valley

Cedar Creek is a rural locality in the City of Moreton Bay, Queensland, Australia. In the 2021 census, Cedar Creek had a population of 831 people.

== Geography ==
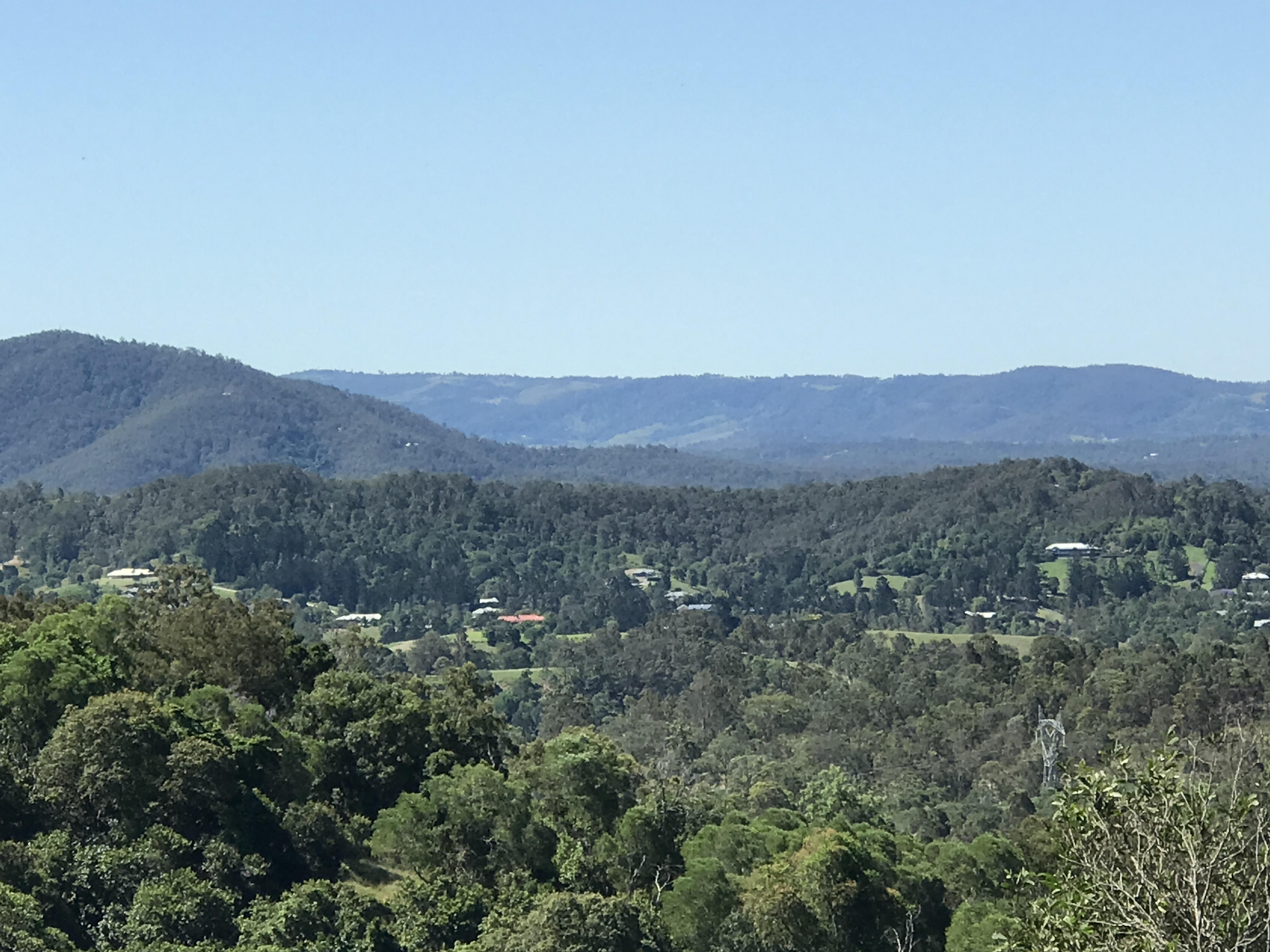
View north across Cedar Creek showing the mountains and the valley, 2022

The terrain in the west and south of the locality is mountainous, rising to unnamed peaks and ridges at 480 metres (1,570 ft) above sea level as part of the Fahey Range and the House Mountain Range. The mountainous terrain is mostly undeveloped.

Cedar Creek (the watercourse) rises in neighbouring Mount Glorious to the west and flows through the locality of Cedar Creek, exiting to Closeburn to the east. The valley created by the creek is lower-lying flatter land ranging from 160 to 90 metres (520 to 300 ft) above sea level as the creek descends from west to east. The valley floor is used for a mixture of rural residential housing and farming (predominantly grazing on native vegetation with some perennial horticulture).

Access into the locality of Cedar Creek is mostly via Cedar Creek Road from Closeburn with some parts of the north of the locality accessed via Herron Road also from Closeburn and a small area in the south-east of the locality accessed via Mayfield Road from neighbouring Samford Valley.

== History ==
Cedar Creek was in Pine Rivers Shire until 2008, when the shire was amalgamated into the Moreton Bay Region, now known as the City of Moreton Bay.

== Demographics ==
In the 2011 census, Cedar Creek had a population of 634 people.

In the 2016 census, Cedar Creek had a population of 745 people.

In the 2021 census, Cedar Creek had a population of 831 people.

== Education ==
There are no schools in Cedar Creek. The nearest government primary school is Mount Samson State School in neighbouring Mount Samson to the north-east. The nearest government secondary school is Ferny Grove State High School in Ferny Grove in the City of Brisbane to the south-east.

== Amenities ==
Andy Williams Park (also known as Cedar Creek Park) is off Cedar Creek Road (27.32857°S 152.80323°E). It has shallow creek pools.

Shopping and other services are available in Samford Village to the south-east.

Despite the name, Cedar Creek Public Hall is now within neighbouring Closeburn (near the watercourse Cedar Creek).
