= South Pine River =

South Pine Eden
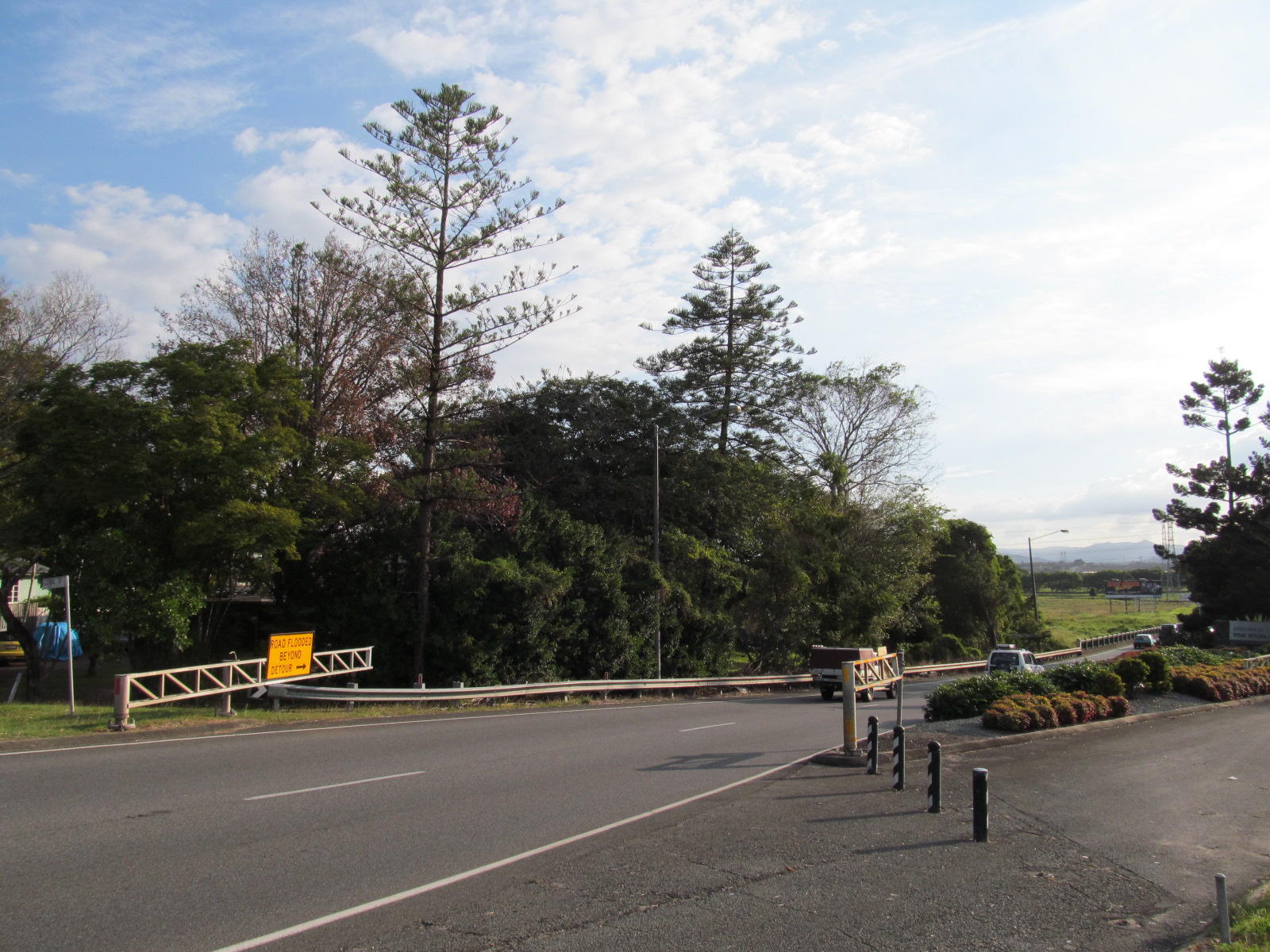
- Gympie Road crossing, 2013

- Location of the South Pine River mouth in Queensland

Location
- Country: Australia
- State: Queensland
- Region: South East Queensland

Physical characteristics
- Source: Mount Glorious, D'Aguilar Range
  - location: near Highvale
  - coordinates: 27°22′01″S 152°47′59″E
  - elevation: 297 m (974 ft)
- Mouth: confluence with the North Pine River to form the Pine River
  - location: Lawnton
  - coordinates: 27°17′16″S 153°00′57″E
  - elevation: 10 m (33 ft)
- Length: 41 km (25 mi)

Basin features
- River system: Pine River catchment
- Tributaries
  - left: Dawson Creek

The South Pine River is a minor river in South East Queensland, Australia. It rises on the D'Aguilar Range and passes through the Samford Valley in the City of Moreton Bay local government area.

== Location and features ==
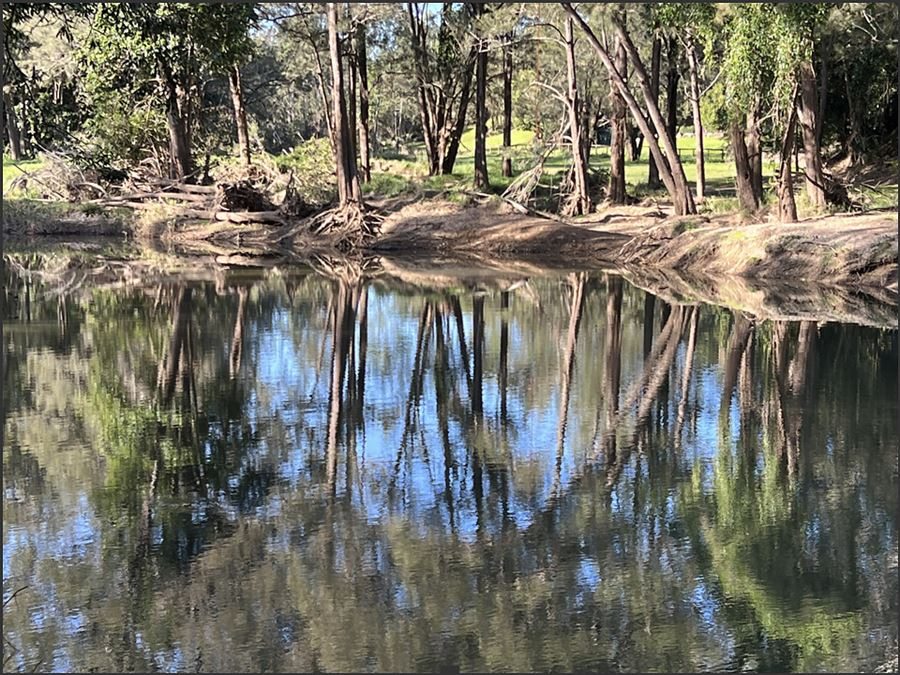
Reflections, South Pine River. Albany Creek, 2022

The South Pine River rises in the D'Aguilar Range below Mount Glorious near Highvale, northwest of Brisbane, and flows generally east, to form its confluence with the North Pine River at Lawnton, where the river forms the Pine River. The river flows mostly through the City of Moreton Bay; it is joined by Dawson Creek, Samford Creek and Cedar Creek before snaking through the outer northwestern suburbs of Brisbane where it divides the suburbs of Eatons Hill and Brendale to the north and Albany Creek to the south. Meeting with Albany Creek in the suburb of the same name, it carries the city council boundary between the Moreton Bay City Council and the Brisbane City Council down to its confluence. To the northwest of the South Pine River are the Pine Rivers suburbs of Strathpine and Lawnton, while on the southeast are Brisbane City Council suburbs Bridgeman Downs and Bald Hills. The river descends 287 metres (942 ft) over its 41-kilometre (25 mi) course. A sewage treatment plant is located at Brendale.

On early maps the river was called Eden River. The Pine Rivers Shire draws its name from the South Pine, North Pine and Pine Rivers. Small steamships traversed the river to deliver molasses from local mills.

== Fauna ==
The river is home to the platypus.

== See also ==
- List of rivers of Australia § Queensland
