= Albany Creek State High School =

High school in Queensland, Australia

Location
- Albany Forest Drive, Albany Creek 4035; Albany Creek, Queensland; Australia; 27.3569°S 152.9980°E

Information
- Type: State, secondary school
- Motto: Knowledge, Pride, Tolerance
- Established: 25 Jan 1982
- School district: Greater Metropolitan North Brisbane
- Principal: Derek Weeks
- Grades: 7–12
- Enrolment: 1,549 (2023)
- Campus: Suburban, 16.5 hectares
- Houses: Apollo, Hercules, Pegasus and Vulcan.
- Colours: Teal, white and gold
- Website: albanycreekshs.eq.edu.au

Albany Creek State High School is a public co-educational secondary school located in the Moreton Bay suburb of Albany Creek, Queensland, Australia. It is administered by the Queensland Department of Education, with an enrolment of 1,549 students and a teaching staff of 121, as of 2023. The school serves students from Year 7 to Year 12.

== History ==
The school opened on 25 January 1982, with John Machoney as the foundation principal.

== Demographics ==
In 2023, the school had a student enrollment of 1,549 with 121 teachers (112.4 full-time equivalent) and 50 non-teaching staff (37.3 full-time equivalent). Female enrolments consisted of 804 students and male enrolments consisted of 745 students; Indigenous enrolments accounted for a total of 2% and 11% of students had a language background other than English.

== Notable alumni ==
- Tayla Harris – Australian Rules footballer

== See also ==
- Lists of schools in Greater Brisbane
- Education in Australia
