= Samford Village, Queensland =

Samford Village Queensland
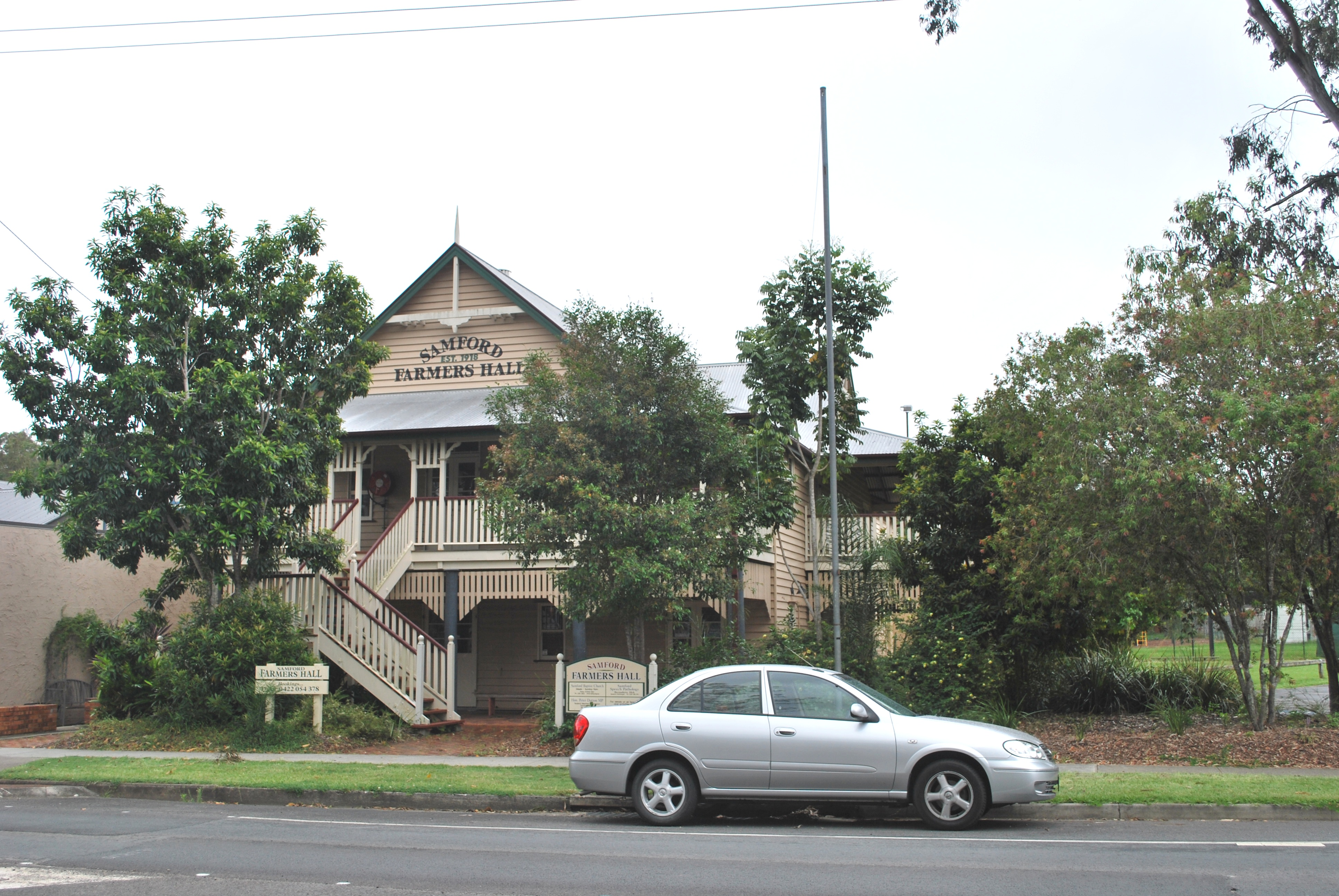
- Samford Farmers Hall, 2010

- Coordinates: 27.3736°S 152.8858°E
- Population: 819 (2021 census)
  - Density: 585/km^{2} (1,520/sq mi)
- Postcode(s): 4520
- Area: 1.4 km^{2} (0.5 sq mi)
- Time zone: AEST (UTC+10:00)
- Location: 18.7 km (12 mi) SW of Strathpine; 21.9 km (14 mi) NW of Brisbane CBD
- LGA(s): City of Moreton Bay
- State electorate(s): Pine Rivers
- Federal division(s): Dickson
Suburbs around Samford Village:
Samford Valley	Samford Valley	Samford Valley
Samford Valley	Samford Village	Samford Valley
Samford Valley	Camp Mountain	Camp Mountain

Samford Village is a rural locality in the City of Moreton Bay, Queensland, Australia. It is one of two localities in the town of Samford (27.3722°S 152.8869°E), the other being Samford Valley. The town's urban area occupies much of the land of the locality. In the 2021 census, Samford Village had a population of 819 people.

== History ==
In 1981, the locality of Samford was split into two localities: Samford Village around the town and Samford Valley wrapping around the village to the west, north, and east.

== Demographics ==
In the 2016 census, Samford Village had a population of 796 people.

In the 2021 census, Samford Village had a population of 819 people.

== Education ==
Samford State School is a government primary (Prep-6) school for boys and girls at School Road (27.3765°S 152.8807°E). In 2018, the school had an enrolment of 850 students with 61 teachers (52 full-time equivalent) and 37 non-teaching staff (23 full-time equivalent). It includes a special education program.

There are no secondary schools in Samford. The nearest government secondary school is Ferny Grove State High school in Ferny Grove to the south-east.

== Community groups ==
The Samford branch of the Queensland Country Women's Association meets at the QCWA Hall at 31 Main Street.

The Samford Support Network is a group of volunteers providing a variety of services to community members who are ill, elderly, living with a disability, or struggling.
