= Albany Creek =

- Suburb
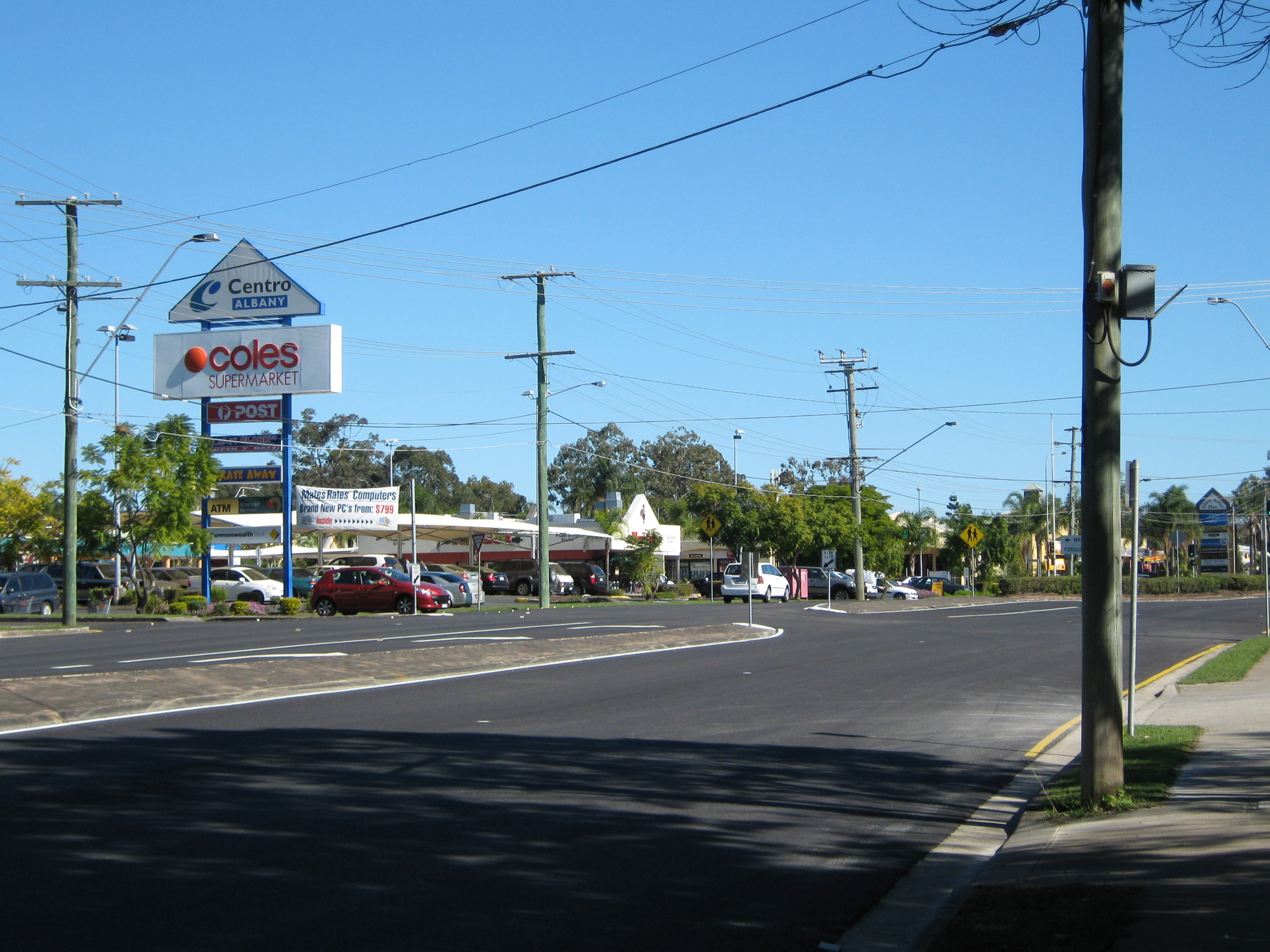
- Albany Creek Road, Queensland

- Interactive map of Albany Creek
- Coordinates: 27.3536°S 152.9683°E
- Country: Australia
- State: Queensland
- City: Moreton Bay
- LGA: City of Moreton Bay
- Location: 7.2 km (4.5 mi) NW of Everton Park; 7.8 km (4.8 mi) S of Strathpine; 17 km (11 mi) N of Brisbane CBD

Government
  - State electorates: Everton; Aspley
  - Federal division: Dickson

Area
  - Total: 9.7 km^{2} (3.7 sq mi)

Population
  - Total: 16,385 (2021 census)
  - Density: 1,689/km^{2} (4,375/sq mi)
- Time zone: UTC+10:00 (AEST)
- Postcode: 4035
Suburbs around Albany Creek
Eatons Hill	Brendale	Bridgeman Downs
Eatons Hill	Albany Creek	Bridgeman Downs
Bunya	Bunya	McDowall

Albany Creek is a southern suburb in the City of Moreton Bay, Queensland, Australia. In the 2021 census, Albany Creek had a population of 16,385 people. Albany Creek is part of the Brisbane metropolitan area.

== Geography ==
Albany Creek is located approximately 17 kilometres north-west of the Brisbane central business district.

Cashs Crossing is a historic crossing point of the South Pine River (27.3418°S 152.9611°E). It takes its name from early settlers James and Mary Cash, who settled near the crossing point. South Pine Road now crosses the river at that point via a bridge.

== History ==
Albany Creek is situated in the Yugarabul traditional Indigenous Australian country.

The suburb of Albany Creek was originally established on the intersection of two Aboriginal tracks. The main track formed the primary route north of Brisbane and is still known as "Old Northern Road". The second track formed a route from Old Northern Road to Little Cabbage Tree Creek in Aspley and onto Downfall Creek in Chermside. Albany Creek Road and Gympie Road now follow this second route.

Albany Creek was originally known as Chinaman's Creek before its name was changed due to growing anti-Chinese sentiment amongst local residents resistant to rising migration that came with the newly-opened gold fields. The new name was chosen in 1885 to honour the Duke of Albany.

A United Methodist Free Church opened in Chinaman's Creek on Sunday 30 December 1866.

Chinaman's Creek State School opened on 25 January 1875, but was downgraded to Chinamans Creek Provisional School in 1883. In 1887 it became Albany Creek State School.

Cashs Crossing at the South Pine River was on the main route from Brisbane to Gympie. In 1891 it was proposed to build a bridge over it. Construction of the bridge had commenced by August 1892. South Pine Bridge was completed in November 1892. It survived the disastrous floods in February 1893 despite three days of great concern.

Initially a rural area, Albany Creek began to develop as a suburban area in the 1960s as the Brisbane metropolitan area expanded. This led to the opening of more schools to cater for the growing population with Albany Hills State School opening on 30 January 1979, Albany Creek State High School opening on 25 January 1982, Good Shepherd Christian (Baptist) School opening in 1983, and All Saints (Catholic) Primary School opening on 24 January 1989.

Albany Creek public library opened in 2000.

== Demographics ==
In the 2011 census, Albany Creek had a population of 15,860 people.

In the 2016 census, Albany Creek had a population of 15,769 people.

In the 2021 census, Albany Creek recorded a population of 16,385 people, 51.2% female and 48.8% male. The median age of the Albany Creek population was 40, 2 years above the state and national median of 38 years. 78% of people living in Albany Creek were born in Australia. The other top responses for country of birth were England 5%, New Zealand 3.2%, South Africa 2.2%, India 0.8%, and Scotland 0.6%. 90.4% of people spoke only English at home; the next most common languages were Afrikaans 0.8%, Italian 0.6%, Spanish 0.5%, and Mandarin and Hindi each 0.4%.

== Education ==
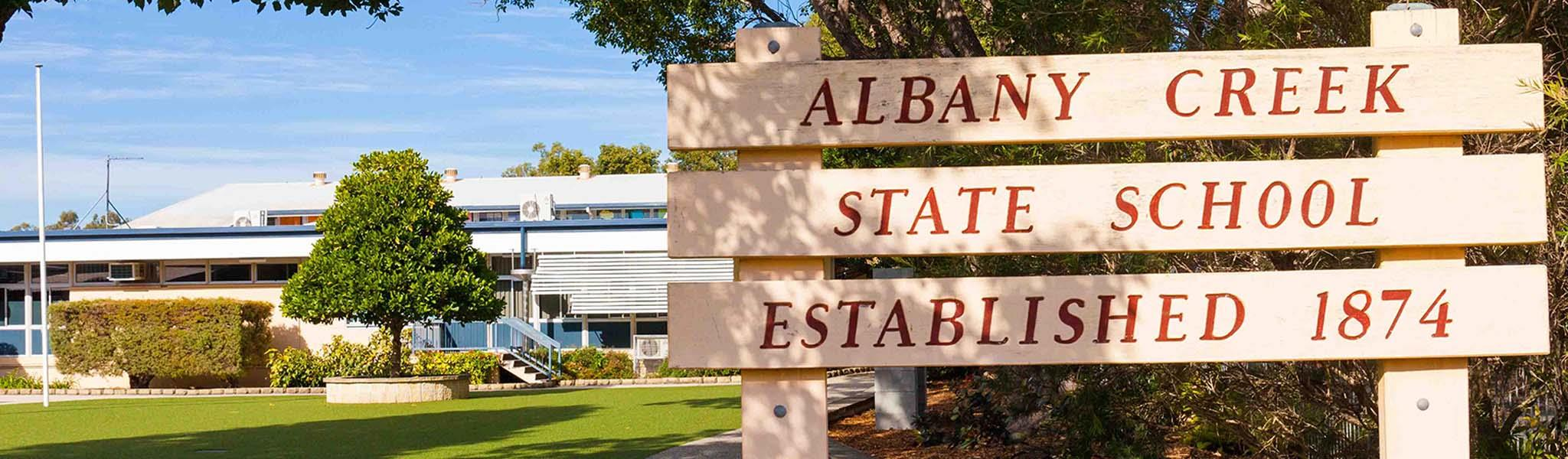
Albany Creek State School, 2025

Albany Creek State School is a government primary (Prep–6) school for boys and girls at 696 Albany Creek Road (27.3458°S 152.9706°E). In 2017, the school had an enrolment of 847 students with 59 teachers (51 full-time equivalent) and 31 non-teaching staff (20 full-time equivalent). In 2018, the school had an enrolment of 844 students with 60 teachers (51 full-time equivalent) and 34 non-teaching staff (22 full-time equivalent). It includes a special education program.

Albany Hills State School is a government primary (Prep–6) school for boys and girls at 118–130 Keong Road (27.3603°S 152.9727°E). In 2017, the school had an enrolment of 812 students with 58 teachers (51 full-time equivalent) and 33 non-teaching staff (21 full-time equivalent). In 2018, the school had an enrolment of 827 students with 64 teachers (56 full-time equivalent) and 38 non-teaching staff (23 full-time equivalent). It includes a special education program.

All Saints Primary School is a private Catholic primary (Prep–6) school for boys and girls at 4 Faheys Road East (27.3500°S 152.9706°E). In 2017, the school had an enrolment of 656 students with 42 teachers (36 full-time equivalent) and 30 non-teaching staff (19 full-time equivalent). In 2018, the school had an enrolment of 645 students with 44 teachers (37 full-time equivalent) and 31 non-teaching staff (19 full-time equivalent).

Good Shepherd Christian School is a private Baptist primary and secondary (Prep–12) school for boys and girls at 185 Old Northern Road (27.3439°S 152.9655°E). In 2017, the school had an enrolment of 109 students with 14 teachers (11 full-time equivalent) and 10 non-teaching staff (4 full-time equivalent). In 2018, the school had an enrolment of 108 students with 13 teachers (11 full-time equivalent) and 8 non-teaching staff (5 full-time equivalent).

Albany Creek State High School is a government secondary (7–12) school for boys and girls at Albany Forest Drive (27.3576°S 152.9686°E). In 2017, the school had an enrolment of 1261 students with 104 teachers (97 full-time equivalent) and 45 non-teaching staff (31 full-time equivalent). It includes a special education program. In 2018, the school had an enrolment of 1305 students with 102 teachers (97 full-time equivalent) and 52 non-teaching staff (34 full-time equivalent).

== Amenities ==
Albany Creek has three main shopping centres, including Woolworths, Aldi and Albany Creek Village, which hosts a Coles supermarket. Several smaller shopping facilities are also located along Albany Creek Road.

The Albany Creek Library is located at 16 Ferguson Street.

Albany Creek has the following churches:

- Good Shepherd Baptist Church
- All Saints Parish
- Albany Creek Uniting Church, 652 Albany Creek Road (27.3462°S 152.9754°E)
- Southpine Seventh-day Adventist Church, holds services in the Uniting church

There are a number of parks in the area:

- Bill Patterson Way (27.3617°S 152.9710°E)
- Bunya Crossing (27.3561°S 152.9494°E)
- Clarrie Beckingham Reserve (27.3636°S 152.9843°E)
- Daniel Reserve (27.3634°S 152.9613°E)
- Jacaranda Park (27.3470°S 152.9658°E)
- Kim Grayson Park (27.3658°S 152.9784°E)
- Leotine Cooper Park (27.3479°S 152.9703°E)
- Mahaca Park (27.3519°S 152.9806°E)
- Mountford Park (27.3406°S 152.9659°E)
- Parkview Place Park (27.3599°S 152.9866°E)
- Richard Lee Reserve (27.3541°S 152.9599°E)
- Stanton Reserve (27.3446°S 152.9586°E)
- Wolter Park (27.3426°S 152.9804°E)

== Sport ==
The local soccer or football club is Moreton City Excelsior FC. With over 1000 registered players and more than 2,500 members, it is the largest soccer club in Brisbane. It provides for junior and senior players. Its other activities include the clubs Kindy Program for players aged 3 to 5, and the club's Football School which provides players a soccer development program for 12 months of the year and is modelled on European academies. In the off-season, Moreton City Excelsior FC provides a Five A Side Competition which incorporates over 35 men and women. The Five A Side competition has grown to be one of the largest off-season social competitions in Brisbane.

== Transport ==
Albany Creek is located in Zones 4 and 5 of the Translink public transport fare system and is serviced by several Transport for Brisbane bus routes. There are no railway stations in the area.

== Notable residents ==
- Scott Daruda, Super Rugby rugby union player, grew up and played football in Albany Creek
- Nelle Lee, actress grew up in and attended school in Albany Creek
- Anthony Morris, TV screenwriter of Australian shows Neighbours and Home and Away, lives in Albany Creek
- Jessica and Lisa Origliasso, the female pop duo The Veronicas, twin sisters, grew up in Albany Creek
- Geoff Trappett, Paralympic athlete, won gold and silver medals, grew up in Albany Creek.
- Ben Tune, former Wallaby and Queensland Reds rugby union player, grew up in Albany Creek
