= Ferny Grove, Queensland =

Ferny Grove
- Suburb
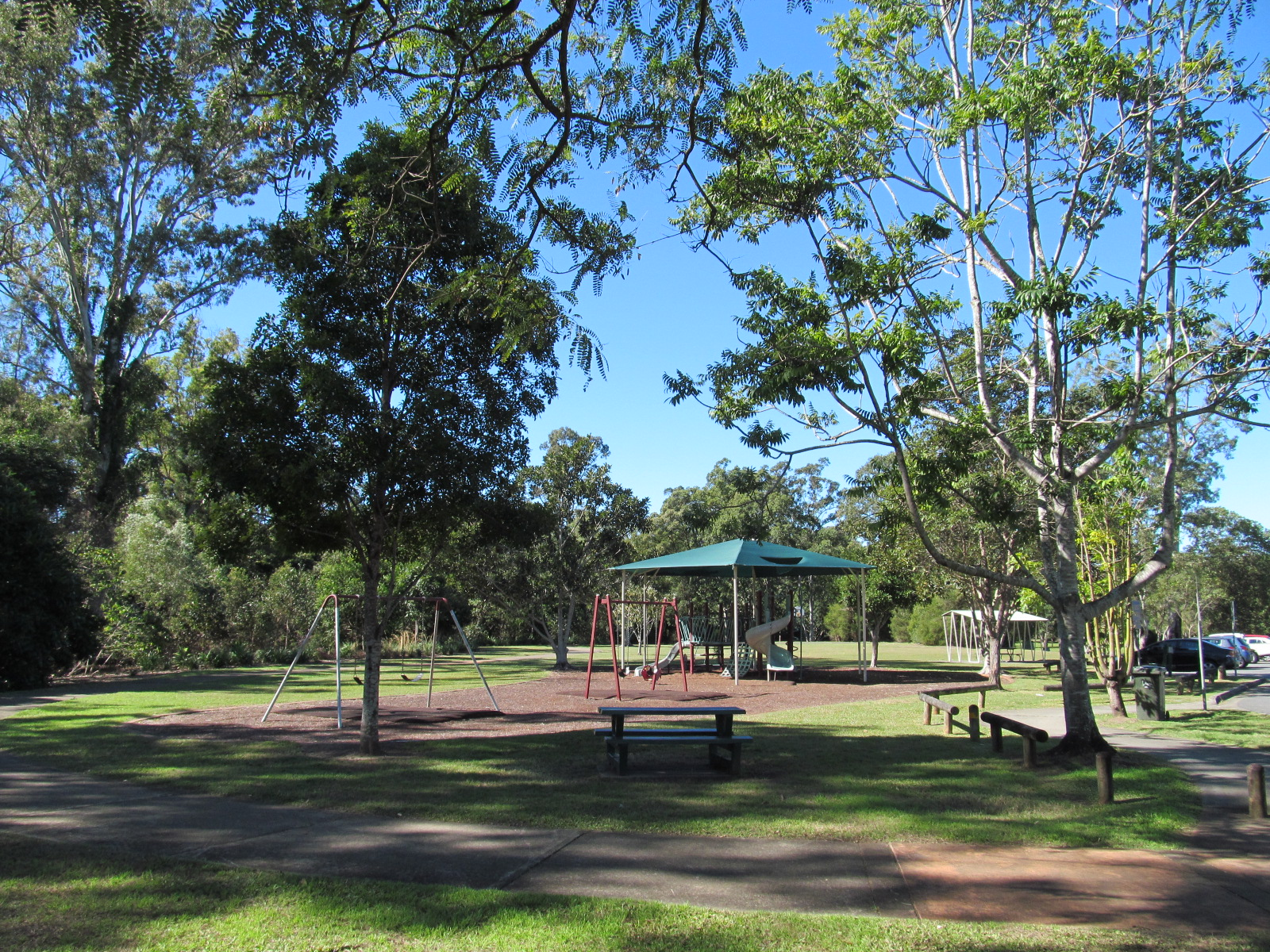
- Ferny Grove Reserve

- Interactive map of Ferny Grove
- Coordinates: 27.4028°S 152.9282°E
- Country: Australia
- State: Queensland
- City: Brisbane
- LGA: City of Brisbane (The Gap Ward)
- Location: 15.0 km (9.3 mi) NW of Brisbane CBD

Government
  - State electorate: Ferny Grove
  - Federal division: Ryan

Area
  - Total: 3.8 km^{2} (1.5 sq mi)

Population
  - Total: 5,871 (2021 census)
  - Density: 1,545/km^{2} (4,000/sq mi)
- Time zone: UTC+10:00 (AEST)
- Postcode: 4055
Suburbs around Ferny Grove
Ferny Hills	Ferny Hills	Ferny Hills
Ferny Hills	Ferny Grove	Keperra
Upper Kedron	Upper Kedron	Keperra

Ferny Grove is an outer north-western suburb in the City of Brisbane, Queensland, Australia. In the 2021 census, Ferny Grove had a population of 5,871 people.

== Geography ==
Ferny Grove is a residential suburb 15 kilometres (9.3 mi) north-west of the Brisbane CBD. It has 8 parks covering nearly 13% of the total area. There are three schools and two childcare centres.

== History ==
The district was originally known as Ferny Flats due to the presence of ferns.

Kedron Upper Provisional School opened on 16 August 1875. In 1889, it had an enrolment of 14 students. On 1 October 1909, it became Kedron Upper State School. In 1913, tenders were called and accepted to erect a new school building, which opened in March 1914. The old school building was sold for removal. In 1940, it was renamed Ferny Grove State School.

The construction of the railway line to Dayboro through the district led to the decision on 22 June 1916 to call the railway station in the area Ferny Grove to avoid confusion with a place called Ferny Flats in New South Wales. The suburb takes its name from the railway station.

The Dayboro railway line opened to Mitchelton railway station (the last station for a suburban passenger service) on 2 March 1918 and to Samford on 1 July 1918, so Ferny Grove railway station would have opened within that period.

Before the Second World War, Ferny Grove was mainly known for its pleasant picnic grounds along the banks of Kedron Brook and large areas of forest and fern filled valleys, one of which gives the suburb its name.

Before large-scale residential development, Ferny Grove was primarily industrial, containing a large claypit and the Wunderlich tile factory operating south of the railway station. The factory ceased operation in February 1963 and the buildings were temporarily used by the Brisbane Tramway Museum Society as their first home. The factory was demolished in 1972 to make way for the original Ferny Grove Tavern.

After the war, while the area was still largely residentially undeveloped, the Brisbane City Council operated a nightsoil sanitation depot beside Cedar Creek. The depot had closed by September 1969, as more of Brisbane was laid with sewerage infrastructure and the need for nightsoil treatment ended.

The Brisbane Tramway Museum Society was established in 1968, when it became apparent that the Brisbane City Council was preparing to close Brisbane's tram system. In 1972, the former nightsoil site at Ferny Grove was leased to the society to establish the Brisbane Tramway Museum (27.4073°S 152.9378°E) which opened in June 1980.

Ferny Grove's urbanisation occurred in the late 1970s. On 17 November 1979, the railway line from Ferny Grove to Keperra was electrified. Ferny Grove State High School opened on 29 January 1980. St Andrews Catholic Primary School opened on 21 July 1985.

Brisbane City Council continued to use the area south of the former nightsoil depot as a large refuse tip until the late 1980s. The ferny grove from which the suburb took its name is no longer there; for, situated at the present site of rubbish dump 40 years old, the grove was buried under a large hill, upon which the City Council operates a waste transfer station (resource recovery centre) and sports playing fields (27.4108°S 152.9379°E).

== Demographics ==
The population in 1996 was 5,016 people. By 2001 the population was 6,011, with a population growth of 20% over those five years.

In the 2011 census, Ferny Grove recorded a population of 5,609 people, 50.5% female and 49.5% male. The median age of the Ferny Grove population was 38 years of age, 1 year above the Australian median. 78.8% of people living in Ferny Grove were born in Australia, compared to the national average of 69.8%; the next most common countries of birth were England 5%, New Zealand 2.6%, South Africa 1.7%, Scotland 0.9%, India 0.9%. 91.1% of people spoke only English at home; the next most popular languages were 0.5% Afrikaans, 0.5% Cantonese, 0.4% Punjabi, 0.4% German, 0.3% Spanish.

In the 2016 census, Ferny Grove had a population of 5,725 people.

In the 2021 census, Ferny Grove had a population of 5,871 people.

== Heritage listings ==
Heritage listings in Ferny Grove include:

- 85 Mcginn Road: Ferny Grove State School's original school building structure.

== Education ==
Ferny Grove State School is a government primary (Prep–6) school for boys and girls at Finvoy Street (27.4027°S 152.9291°E). In 2017, the school had an enrolment of 841 students with 62 teachers (56 full-time equivalent) and 33 non-teaching staff (23 full-time equivalent). It includes a special education program.

St Andrew's Catholic School is a Catholic primary (Prep–6) school for boys and girls at 89 Hogarth Road (27.4093°S 152.9261°E). In 2017, the school had an enrolment of 618 students with 47 teachers (37 full-time equivalent) and 29 non-teaching staff (15 full-time equivalent).

Ferny Grove State High School is a government secondary (7–12) school for boys and girls at McGinn Road (27.4057°S 152.9337°E). In 2017, the school had an enrolment of 1,741 students with 146 teachers (133 full-time equivalent) and 70 non-teaching staff (51 full-time equivalent). It includes a special education program.

== Transport ==
The Ferny Grove railway station (27.4017°S 152.9356°E) is now the terminal of the railway line of the same name. Until 1955 the railway line continued to Dayboro and Ferny Grove was merely a minor station on the line. The line is now supplied with electricity at 25 kV AC. There are many bus routes.
