= Ferny Grove State High School =

Location
- Ferny Grove, Queensland; Australia; 27.406172°S 152.934552°E

Information
- Type: Independent public school
- Motto: Always Aim High
- Established: 1980
- Principal: Kiah Lanham
- Enrolment: 1963 (2021)
- Colour: peppermint green/bottle green
- Website: Official School Webpage

Ferny Grove State High School is a public secondary school in the suburb of Ferny Grove, in Brisbane, Australia.

The school has a total enrolment of more than 1900 students, with an official count of 1961 students in 2023. In 2007, the school won the award for the most innovative music program in Queensland. Ferny Grove also won the award for the cleanest school for 8 years, with the latest Green and Healthy Schools award being won in 2010.

== History ==
The school was opened in 1980 on its current site at McGinn Road, Ferny Grove, near the Ferny Grove Railway Station and primary school; the Primary school is located in Finvoy Street.

=== Principals ===
- Keith Tabulo (1980–1982)
- Tony Marsland (1982–1985)
- Ralph Took (1985–2000)
- Russell Burguez (Acting) (2000)
- Chris Rider (2000–2007)
- Kaye Gardner (2007–2010)
- David Sutton (Acting) (2010)
- Mark Breckenridge (2010–2017)
- John Schuh (2018–2021)
- Joseba Larrazabal (Acting) (2021)
- Janelle Amos (Acting) (2021)
- Kiah Lanham (Acting) (2022–present)

=== Teachers ===
Notable teachers at the school include John Howard Amundsen who taught the subjects of manual arts, media and business. Amundsen gained notoriety in May 2006, after a stockpile of explosives and detonators were found in his home which caused the school to be evacuated and searched. On 10 May 2006, the school was closed for most of the morning as police with sniffer dogs checked classrooms, before they declared it safe for students and staff to resume lessons. In a Brisbane court on 11 May 2006, he was charged with fraudulently obtaining 53 kg of the explosive substance Powergel. He was charged with preparing a terrorist act, as well as two counts of making a threat and making a hoax threat. In February 2007, the charges of terrorism and making a hoax threat were dropped but replaced with new charges of possessing incendiary devices and having dangerous goods in a vehicle.

== Campus ==
=== Location ===
The school is located in the suburb of Ferny Grove in Queensland's capital city, Brisbane. It is situated on McGinn Road, neighbouring Ferny Grove State School and the Ferny Grove Railway Station.

== Alumni ==
- Andrew Letherby, long-distance runner. Bronze medallist at the 2002 Commonwealth Games.
- Anthony Lister, artist.
- Jharal Yow Yeh, rugby league player. Represented Queensland and Australia.
- Julia Robinson, NRLW player
- Justin Hodges, rugby league player. Represented Queensland and Australia. Won premierships in 2002 and 2006. Captain of the Brisbane Broncos from 2014-15. Dally M Centre of the Year in 2007.
- Lisa and Jessica Origliasso of The Veronicas. The sisters sang together in the 1998 Ferny High school talent quest and placed second.
- Melina Vidler, actress. Won Most Outstanding Newcomer – Actress at the 2016 Logie Awards.
- Remy Hii, actor. Won Most Outstanding Newcomer at the 2014 Logie Awards.
- Ryan Williams, former German teacher at the school before leaving to pursue a medical career. Winner of the TJ Ryan award.
- Sharon Cripps, sprinter. Gold medallist at the 1998 Commonwealth Games. Competed at the 1996 and 2000 Olympics.
- Shaun Berrigan, rugby league player. Represented Queensland and Australia. Won premierships in 2000 and 2006. Clive Churchill medallist in 2006.
- Stephen Eaton, OAM, athlete. Gold medallist at the 2000 Summer Paralympics.
- Tamara Nowitzki, swimmer. Silver medallist at the 2000 Summer Paralympics.
