= Ocean View, Queensland =

Ocean View
- Suburb
- Interactive map of Ocean View
- Coordinates: 27.1283°S 152.7994°E
- Country: Australia
- State: Queensland
- LGA: City of Moreton Bay
- Location: 31.7 km (19.7 mi) NW of Bray Park; 32.8 km (20.4 mi) NW of Strathpine; 34.3 km (21.3 mi) S of Woodford; 56 km (35 mi) NNW of Brisbane CBD

Government
  - State electorate: Glass House
  - Federal division: Dickson

Area
  - Total: 39.5 km^{2} (15.3 sq mi)

Population
  - Total: 1,022 (2021 census)
  - Density: 25.87/km^{2} (67.01/sq mi)
- Time zone: UTC+10:00 (AEST)
- Postcode: 4521
Suburbs around Ocean View
Mount Mee	Campbells Pocket	Rocksberg
Mount Pleasant	Ocean View	Rocksberg
Mount Pleasant	King Scrub; Dayboro	Rush Creek

Ocean View is a rural locality in the City of Moreton Bay, Queensland, Australia. In the 2021 census, Ocean View had a population of 1,022 people.

== Geography ==
Ocean View is north of the town of Dayboro.

Ocean View is the gateway to the mountain range of Mount Mee, about 10 minutes drive from the town of Dayboro, and located on top of the mountain. It is a very quiet and secluded rural suburb, covered with acreage properties, small farms, and winery estates.

Brisbane–Woodford Road (Mount Mee Road) runs through from south-east to west.

== History ==
Ocean View State School opened on 10 April 1922 using the relocated school building from Armstrong Creek. It closed in 1963.

== Demographics ==
In the 2011 census, Ocean View recorded a population of 817 people, 50.2% female and 49.8% male. The median age of the Ocean View population was 44 years, 7 years above the national median of 37. 76.4% of people living in Ocean View were born in Australia. The other top responses for country of birth were England 6.3%, New Zealand 3.1%, South Africa 1.6%, Germany 1.1%, Netherlands 0.6%. 92.3% of people spoke only English at home; the next most common languages were 1.1% German, 0.9% Dutch, 0.7% Afrikaans, 0.5% Polish.

In the 2016 census, Ocean View had a population of 936 people.

In the 2021 census, Ocean View had a population of 1,022 people.

== Education ==
There are no schools in Ocean View. The nearest government primary schools are Mount Mee State School in neighbouring Mount Mee to the north-west and Dayboro State School in Dayboro to the south. The nearest government schools are Woodford State School (to Year 10) in Woodford to the north and Bray Park State High School (to Year 12) in Bray Park to the south-east.

== Facilities ==
- A Telstra telephone exchange
- Ocean View Rural Fire Brigade
