= Kobble Creek =

Kobble Creek Queensland
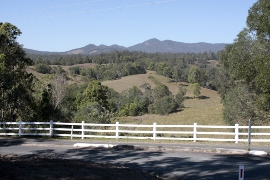
- Looking across Kobble Creek towards Mount Samson

- Coordinates: 27.2666°S 152.8008°E
- Population: 654 (2021 census)
  - Density: 12.601/km^{2} (32.64/sq mi)
- Postcode(s): 4520
- Area: 51.9 km^{2} (20.0 sq mi)
- Time zone: AEST (UTC+10:00)
- Location: 26.5 km (16 mi) WNW of Strathpine; 40.6 km (25 mi) NW of Brisbane CBD
- LGA(s): City of Moreton Bay
- State electorate(s): Pine Rivers
- Federal division(s): Dickson
Suburbs around Kobble Creek:
Laceys Creek	Armstrong Creek	Samsonvale
Laceys Creek	Kobble Creek	Samsonvale
Dundas	Mount Glorious	Samsonvale

Kobble Creek is a rural locality in the City of Moreton Bay, Queensland, Australia. In the 2021 census, Kobble Creek had a population of 654 people.

== Geography ==
Kobble Creek is situated along Mount Samson Road to the south of Dayboro, approximately 45 kilometres (28 mi) northwest of the Brisbane central business district.

The south-eastern boundary of the locality is the Mount Samson Range (27.2853°S 152.8126°E). The range includes Mount Kobble (27.2761°S 152.8258°E) at a height of 384 metres (1,260 ft). The name Kobble is derived from the Waka language, Garumngar dialect, word kabul meaning carpet snake.

The western part of the locality is mountainous and within the D'Aguilar National Park which extends further west into a number of other localities.

The land use in the eastern part of the locality is a mixture of rural residential housing, grazing on native vegetation and some crop growing.

== History ==
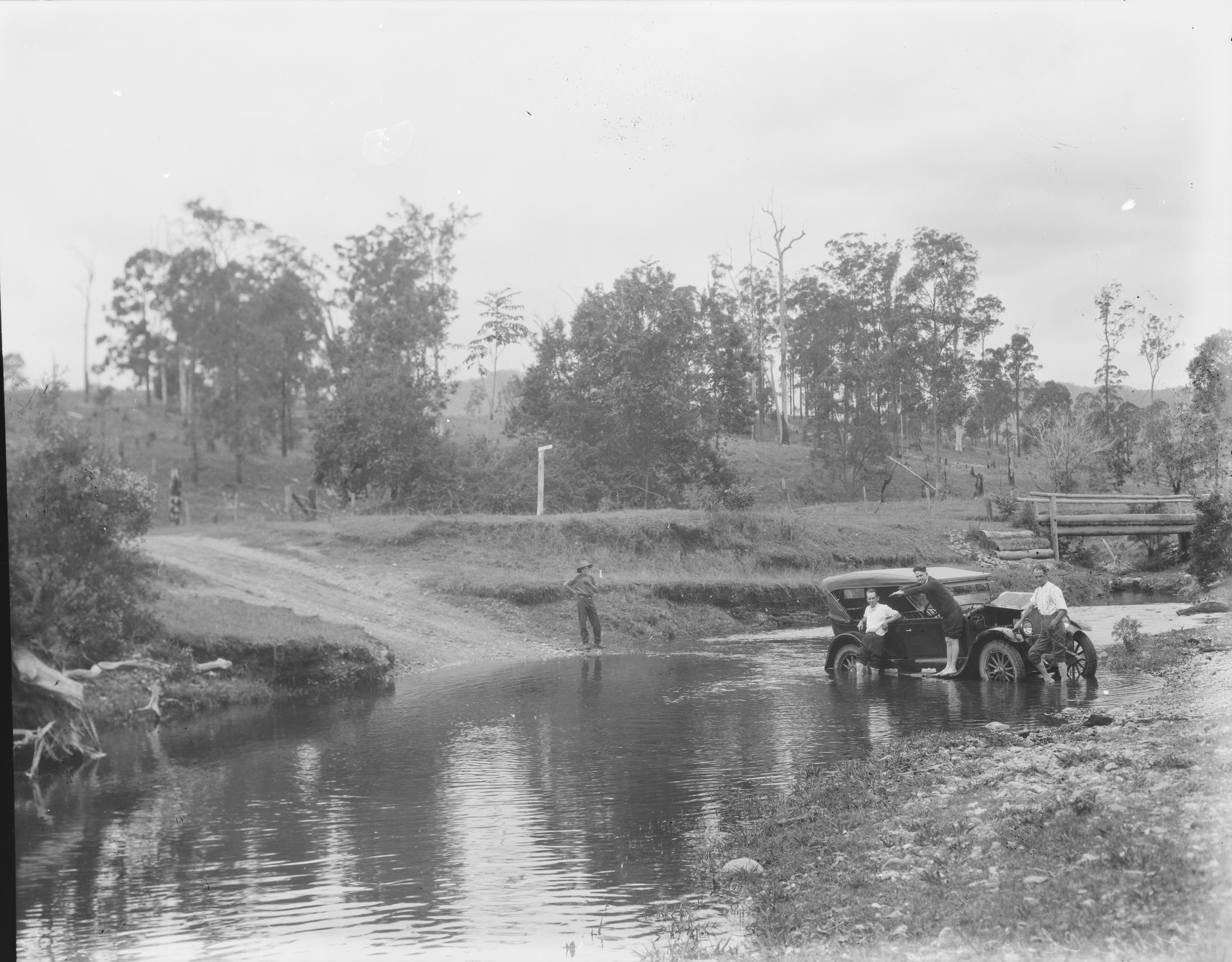
Trying to cross Kobble Creek, 1925

The locality is named after the creek Kobble Creek that forms part of the catchment area of Lake Samsonvale, which supplies drinking water to north Brisbane and the Moreton Bay Region.

Kobble Creek was, in years gone by, predominantly a dairy farming community with some banana and pineapple farming on surrounding hillsides. As a farming community, Kobble Creek supported a butter factory, primary school, and railway station, the latter two located near the site of the current Samsonvale Rural Fire Brigade. Following the forced resumption of much of the best farming land in the district to build the North Pine Dam and flood Lake Samsonvale, today the district is predominantly a rural-dormitory zone with very limited farming undertaken.

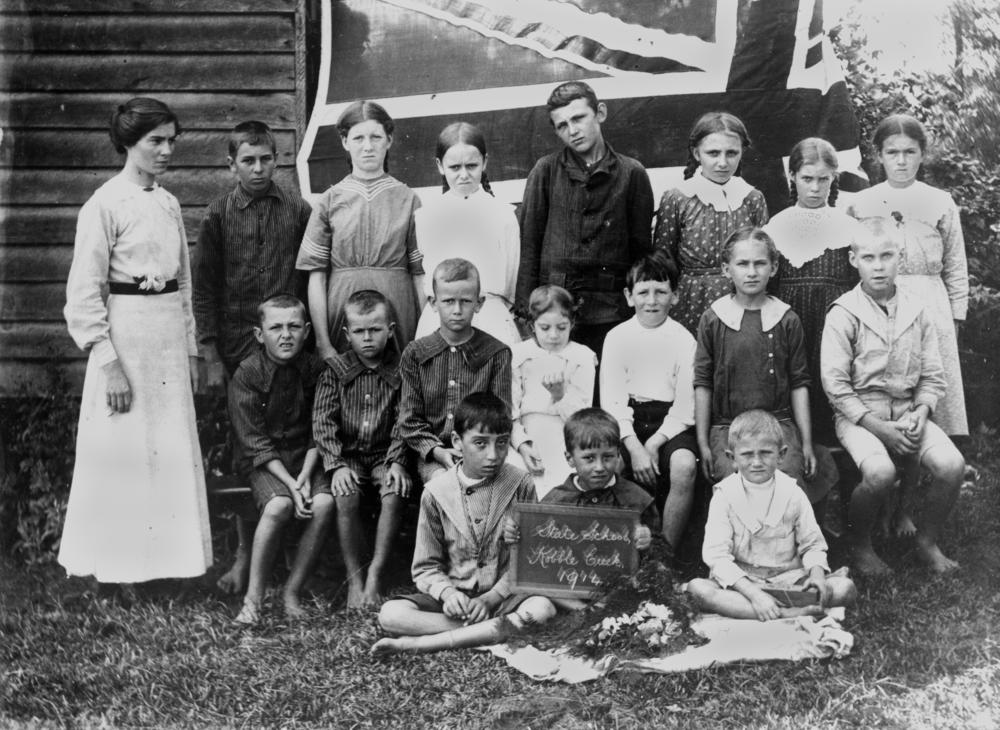
Kobble Creek State School, 1914

Kobble Creek Provisional School opened circa 1881. On 1 January 1909, it became Kobble Creek State School. It is sometimes written as Cobble Creek State School. It closed in 1954. It was at 14 Greensill Lane (27.25135°S 152.84234°E).

In 1919, the Dayboro railway line reached Kobble Creek with the Kobble railway station opening on 3 November 1919; the line reached its terminus at Dayboro railway station on 25 September 1920.

Kobble Creek was officially named and bounded as a locality in June 2009, but was formerly part of the Samsonvale district.

== Demographics ==
In the 2011 census, the population of Kobble Creek was 499, 48.7% female and 51.3% male. The median age of the Kobble Creek population was 39 years of age, two years above the Australian average. 77.8% of people living in Kobble Creek were born in Australia. The other top responses for country of birth were England 6.8%, New Zealand 3.4%, South Africa 0.8%, Canada 0.6%, Cyprus 0.6%. 92.6% of people spoke only English at home; the next most common languages were 0.6% German, and 0.6% American Languages.

In the 2016 census, Kobble Creek had a population of 632 people.

In the 2021 census, Kobble Creek had a population of 654 people.

== Education ==
There are no schools in Kobble Creek. The nearest government primary schools are Dayboro State School in Dayboro to the north and Mount Samson State School in Mount Samson to the south-east. The nearest government secondary school is Bray Park State High School in Bray Park to the east.
