= Samsonvale, Queensland =

Samsonvale
- Suburb
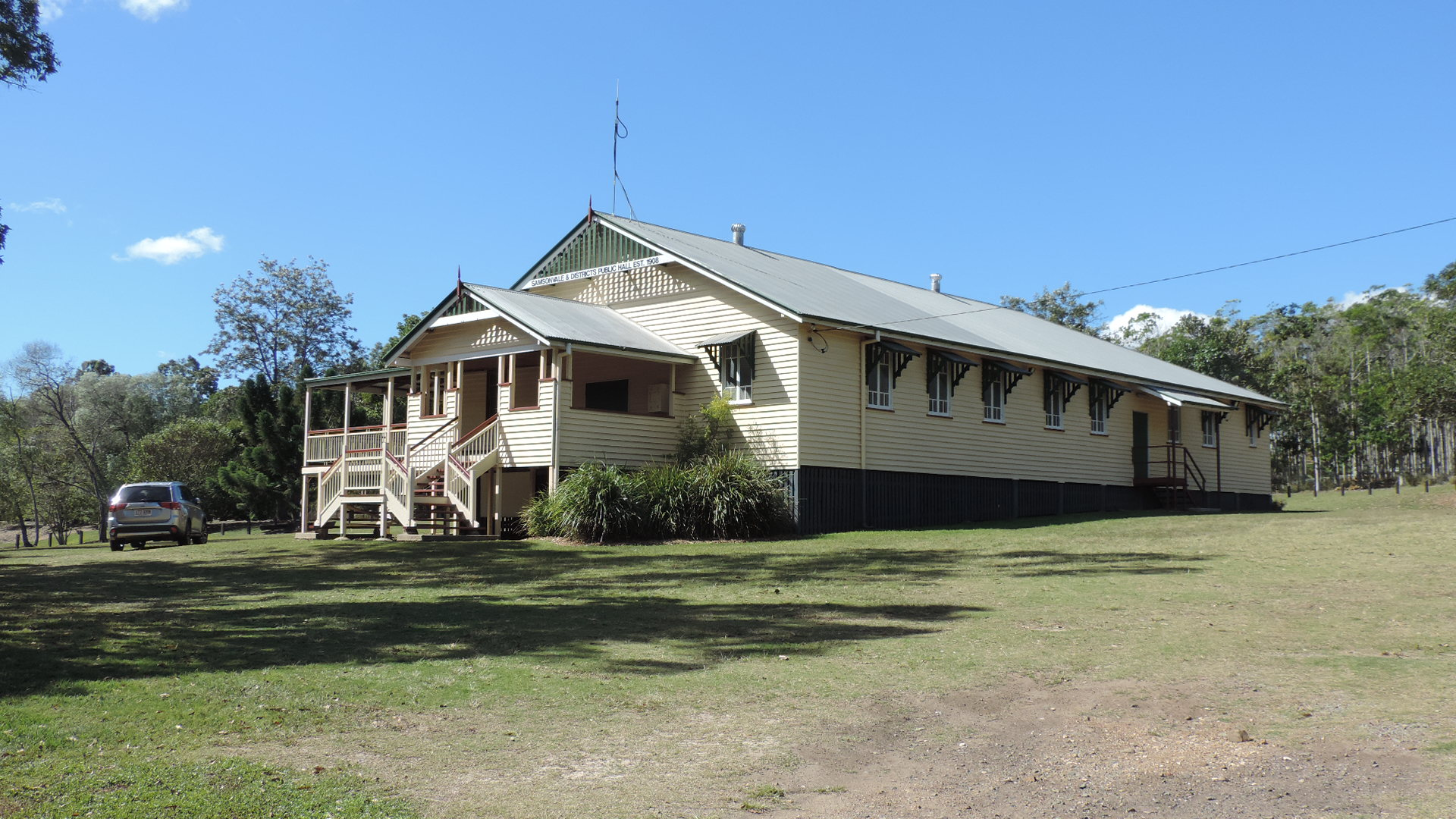
- Samsonvale & Districts Public Hall, 2020

- Interactive map of Samsonvale
- Coordinates: 27.2619°S 152.8580°E
- Country: Australia
- State: Queensland
- LGA: City of Moreton Bay
- Location: 22.6 km (14.0 mi) W of Strathpine; 36.7 km (22.8 mi) NW of Brisbane CBD
- Established: 1845

Government
  - State electorate: Pine Rivers
  - Federal division: Dickson

Area
  - Total: 33.8 km^{2} (13.1 sq mi)

Population
  - Total: 674 (2021 census)
  - Density: 19.94/km^{2} (51.65/sq mi)
- Time zone: UTC+10:00 (AEST)
- Postcode: 4520
Suburbs around Samsonvale
Dayboro; Armstrong Creek	Rush Creek	Whiteside
Kobble Creek	Samsonvale	Cashmere
Mount Glorious	Mount Samson	Mount Samson

Samsonvale is a rural locality in the City of Moreton Bay, Queensland, Australia. In the 2021 census, Samsonvale had a population of 674 people.

== Geography ==
The district is dominated by Lake Samsonvale, the waters of North Pine Dam, one of the three main water-suppliers to the metropolitan region. Samsonvale sits below the highest peak in the area, Mount Samson.

== History ==
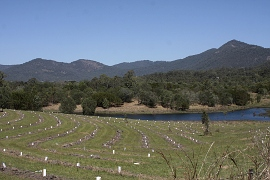
View of Mount Samson from Golds Scrub Lane

Samsonvale was occupied by the indigenous people, who named the area Tukuwompa.

British settlement of Samsonvale began with the Samsonvale pastoral run established in 1845 by the Joyner family and the locality takes its name from the pastoral run. The nearby suburb of Joyner is named after the family.

The history of Samsonvale is one of forced resumptions with three quarters of the Joyner's original pastoral run in the 1860s being taken from them.

Samsonvale Provisional School opened on 1 June 1875. It closed in 1880. It was located "100 yards north of the Presbyterian Church" (approx 27.26789°S 152.85904°E).

Presbyterian church services were originally held in the provisional school, a slab hut. After the school closed, local people raised funds and built a church using timber from the immediately surrounding area in 1884, which officially opened on Sunday 25 January 1885 by the Reverend A. Macintosh. The church was built on land donated by the Gold family and was located at the end of Gold Scrub Lane (27.26879°S 152.85901°E). The church was renovated in 1913. Although the church site was not inundated by the North Pine Dam, the loss of farm land due to the dam resulted in many members of the congregation leaving the district from 1957 onwards. Without a viable congregation, the church closed in 1969. The building was purchased by the Dam Construction Authority and was demolished in 1973. A memorial was placed on the church site.

In 1918, the Dayboro railway line reached Samford with the Samford railway station opening on 1 July 1918; the line would finally reach its terminus at Dayboro railway station on 25 September 1920. In 1955, the line closed from Ferny Grove to Dayboro, closing the Samford railway station. The remaining Ferny Grove railway line is now only a passenger service within the City of Brisbane with Ferny Grove railway station being the closest rail connection from Samford.

Samsonvale was predominantly a dairy farming community centred on a station on the Dayboro railway line.

The North Pine Dam was built between 1968 and 1974 and required the resumption of 105 family homes. The flooding of the impoundment, Lake Samsonvale, also closed the Presbyterian Church, community hall, and post office.

All that remains today at the site of the old village is a cemetery with much of the former district underwater, along with the original Samsonvale pastoral run.

The current Samsonvale Rural Fire Brigade facility sits above what was once the centre of the Kobble Creek community.

In 2006, during a drought seeing water levels of Lake Samsonvale falling to unprecedented lows, archeological works were considered by the local council to preserve historic artifacts from flooded homesteads dating back to the 19th Century. In 2010 Lake Samsonvale was once again filled to capacity, covering the historical sites and much of the district's best farming land.

== Demographics ==
In the 2011 census, Samsonvale recorded a population of 555 people, 49.2% female and 50.8% male. The median age of the Samsonvale population was 38 years, 1 year above the national median of 37. 83.8% of people living in Samsonvale were born in Australia. The other top responses for country of birth were England 6.1%, New Zealand 1.8%, Germany 0.9%, Papua New Guinea 0.9%, South Africa 0.7%. 94.2% of people spoke only English at home; the next most common languages were 1.4% German, 0.7% Arabic, 0.7% Spanish, 0.5% French.

In the 2016 census, Samsonvale had a population of 590 people.

In the 2021 census, Samsonvale had a population of 674 people.

== Education ==
There are no schools in Samsonvale. The nearest government primary schools are Dayboro State School in neighbouring Dayboro to the north-west and Mount Samson State School in neighbouring Mount Samson to the south. The nearest government secondary schools are Bray Park State High School in Bray Park to the east and Ferny Grove State High School in Ferny Grove to the south-east.

== Attractions ==
The area around the cemetery has a large biodiversity, with over 250 species of bird recorded.
