= Mount Pleasant, Queensland =

Mount Pleasant, Queensland may refer to:

- Mount Pleasant, Queensland (Moreton Bay Region), a mountain and locality in the Moreton Bay Region, part of the D'Aguilar Range
- Mount Pleasant, Queensland (Mackay Region), a mountain and suburb of Mackay in the Mackay Region
