= Mount Byron, Queensland =

Mount Byron
- Suburb
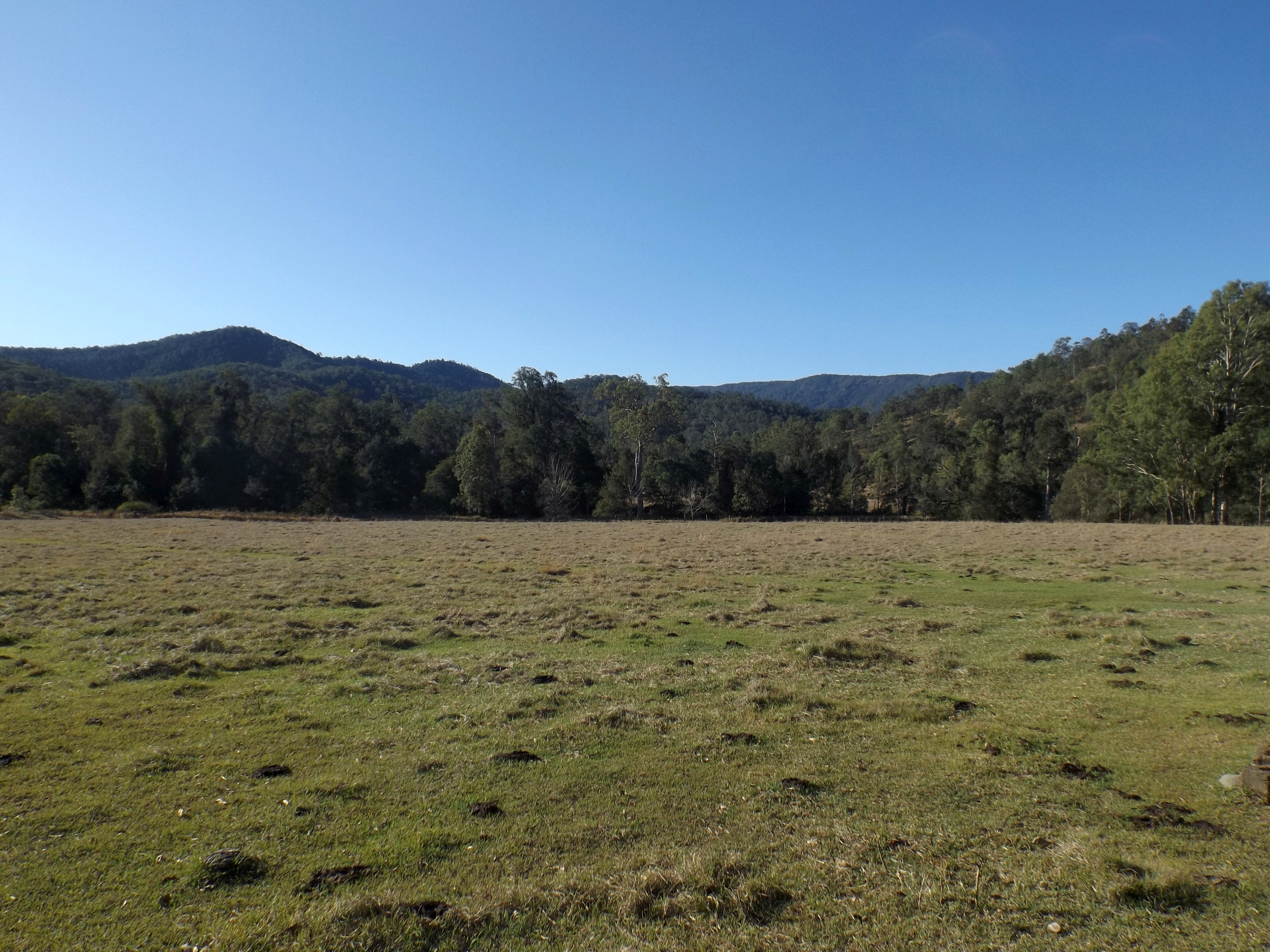
- Paddocks along Mount Byron Road, 2015

- Interactive map of Mount Byron
- Coordinates: 27.1486°S 152.6844°E
- Country: Australia
- State: Queensland
- LGA: Somerset Region
- Location: 37.2 km (23.1 mi) NW of Esk; 96.8 km (60.1 mi) NW of Brisbane CBD

Government
  - State electorate: Nanango
  - Federal division: Blair

Area
  - Total: 148.9 km^{2} (57.5 sq mi)

Population
  - Total: 21 (2021 census)
  - Density: 0.141/km^{2} (0.365/sq mi)
- Time zone: UTC+10:00 (AEST)
- Postcode: 4312
Suburbs around Mount Byron
Westvale	Mount Archer	Mount Mee
Crossdale	Mount Byron	Mount Pleasant
Bryden	Dundas	Laceys Creek

Mount Byron is a rural locality in the Somerset Region, Queensland, Australia. In the 2021 census, Mount Byron had a population of 21 people.

== Geography ==
The rugged terrain of the D'Aguilar Range in the east is protected within the D'Aguilar National Park. Mount Byron reaches elevations greater than 600 metres (2,000 ft) above sea level. Lower elevations along Byron Creek, a tributary of the Stanley River, have been cleared of vegetation.

Mount Byron (27.1151°S 152.6726°E) is 617 metres (2,024 ft) above sea level.

== History ==
The locality takes its name from the mountain Mount Bryon.

Mount Byron Station was operated by the Bowman Family from the 1880s until the 1960s. William Macarthur Bowman had come to the area in 1848 to work on the neighbouring local station, Mt Brisbane. The McConnel family who ran Mt Brisbane then still operate that station today.

Brown & Broad operated a timber sawmill at Mount Byron around 1912. By 1923 Raymond & Hossack were also operating a timber mill in the area.

Mining operations commenced in 1918.

Mount Byron State School opened on 29 May 1919 and closed on 17 January 1930.

A large bushfire occurred in October 1926.

In 2024, Mount Byron Valley was assessed for its feasibility to be dammed and used as a pumped hydro electric facility, but it was decided that other proposals such as Borumba and Pioneer Burdekin would be better locations. As of July 2025, much of the easternmost valley is leased by Powerlink Queensland, a government owned corporation that "owns, develops, operates and maintains the high voltage electricity transmission network in Queensland."

== Demographics ==
In the 2016 census, Mount Byron had a population of 18 people.

In the 2021 census, Mount Byron had a population of 21 people.

== Education ==
There are no schools in Mount Byron. The nearest government primary schools are Dayboro State School in Dayboro to the east and Toogoolawah State School in Toogoolawah to the west. The nearest government secondary schools are Woodford State School (to Year 10) in Woodford to the north-east, Bray Park State High School in Bray Park to the south-east, Toogoolawah State High School (to Year 12) in Toogoolawah to the west, and Kilcoy State High School in Kilcoy to the north-west.
