= Dundas, Queensland =

Dundas
- Suburb
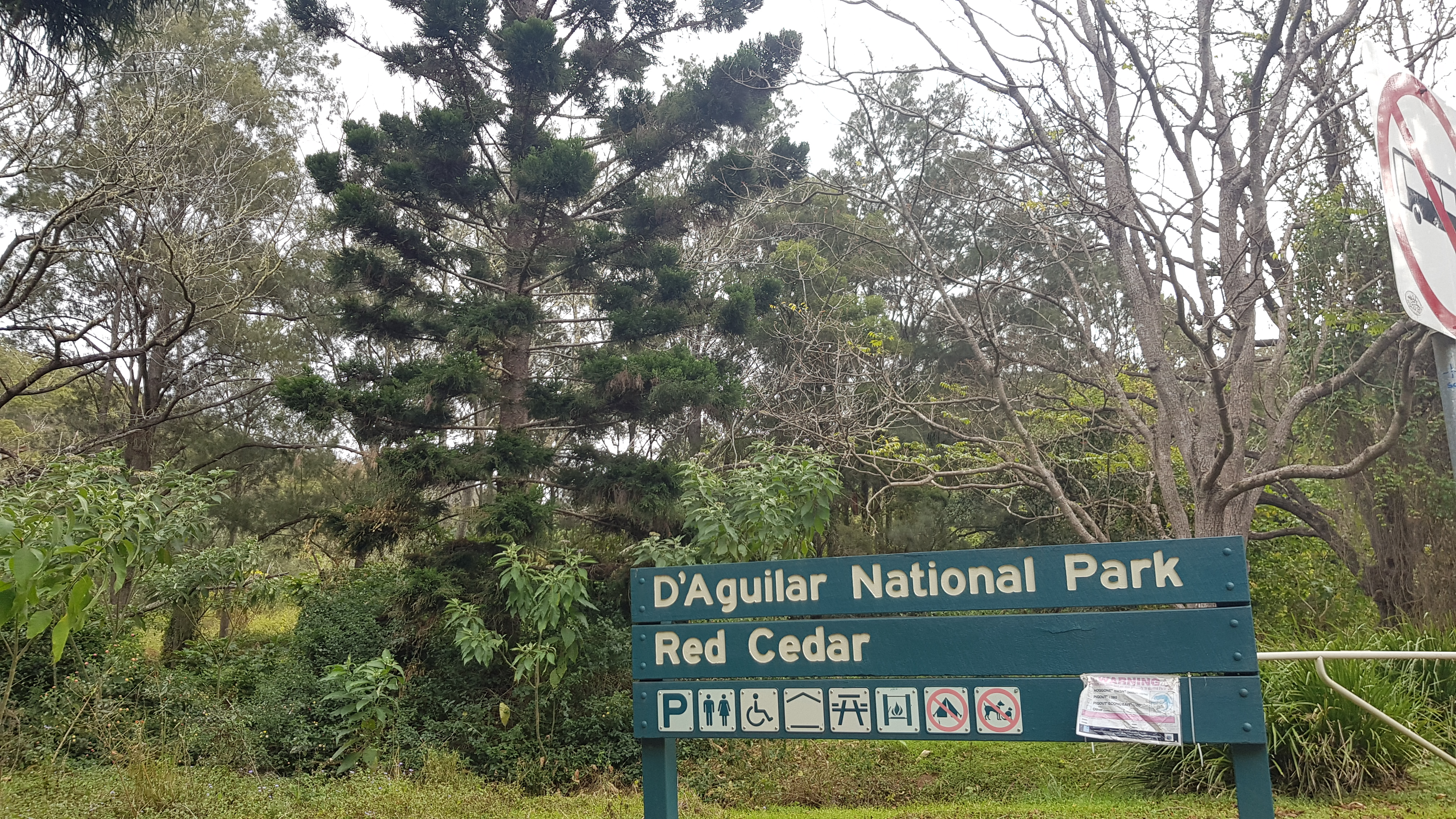
- Red Cedar Park, 2023

- Interactive map of Dundas
- Coordinates: 27.2986°S 152.6844°E
- Country: Australia
- State: Queensland
- LGA: Somerset Region
- Location: 52.6 km (32.7 mi) SE of Esk; 47.5 km (29.5 mi) N of Ipswich; 73.4 km (45.6 mi) NW of Brisbane

Government
  - State electorate: Nanango
  - Federal division: Blair

Area
  - Total: 123.4 km^{2} (47.6 sq mi)

Population
  - Total: 58 (2021 census)
  - Density: 0.470/km^{2} (1.217/sq mi)
- Time zone: UTC+10:00 (AEST)
- Postcode: 4306
Suburbs around Dundas
Bryden	Mount Byron	Laceys Creek
Bryden; Lake Wivenhoe	Dundas	Laceys Creek; Mount Glorious
Lake Wivenhoe	Split Yard Creek	England Creek

Dundas is a rural locality in the Somerset Region, Queensland, Australia. In the 2021 census, Dundas had a population of 58 people.

== Geography ==
A majority of Dundas is protected within the D'Aguilar National Park. Several peaks of the D'Aguilar Range are in Dundas, including Mount Sim Jue, The Bulls Knob, Northbrook and Tenison Woods Mountain, the highest peak on the range. The Northbrook Parkway is the only crossing over the D'Aguilar Range, connecting the south of the Somerset Region with the City of Moreton Bay.

Dundas borders the Wivenhoe Dam and the public boating facilities of Billy's Bay. The area is best accessed via Wivenhoe-Somerset Road on approach from Fernvale. Public access to this area by public transport is limited to a local school bus service.

The natural park like attributes of this area make it ideal for wildlife. It is not uncommon to hear songbirds and to see bush turkeys in the natural forest, and eagles flying overhead at the peaks of the local mountains. Deer which was the emblem of the Shire of Esk can be spotted in the area on rare occasion. Lake Wivenhoe allows Dundas residents to see the sunset over water (not normally possible in South-East Queensland).

There are some public parks and recreational facilities in the Dundas area in addition to Billy's Bay. They include the Lake Wivenhoe Branch Creek Day Use Area, maintained by SEQ Water, located on Wivenhoe-Somerset Road near Kipper Creek Road and two parks: Red Cedar and White Cedar, both located on the Western approach of the Northbrook Parkway. East of the last-mentioned two parks, is the Northbrook Gorge (fresh water swimming, accessible from an unsigned car park, moderate difficulty walking access down steep slope) and the Wivenhoe Lookout 5 minutes drive further up the mountain with marked car park and wood BBQ facilities and toilet.

== History ==
The first holder of the Fairney View pastoral run was Joseph North, whose wife was christened Robert Dundas Burnett after a friend of her father (Judge John Burnett). Burnett's intention had been to name a son after his friend but he had a daughter instead. North used the Dundas name for part of his property holdings and it gave the name to the district.

Dundass Provisional School opened circa 1890 and closed in 1895. It reopened in 1898 slightly renamed as Dundas Provisional School. On 1 January 1909, it became Dundas State School. Between April 1929 and January 1932, it operated as a half-time school in conjunction with Bryden State School (meaning the two schools shared a single teacher). Dundas State School closed in 1942. It was on the northern side of Kipper Creek Road, now within the neighbouring locality of Lake Wivenhoe (approx 27.3229°S 152.6486°E).

The Dundas police station was established on 15 December 1893, but was renamed Sandy Creek in February 1894. In March 1896, it was relocated to Deep Creek.

The Dundas Public Hall was officially opened on 27 October 1928 by Littleton Groom.

The Anglican Church at Dundas opened in 1955. It closed on 20 February 1977 for the construction of the Wivenhoe Dam.

Dundas was significantly impacted by the introduction of the Wivenhoe Dam. The construction of the Wivenhoe Dam resulted in several farms and the original road infrastructure for the area being permanently flooded. The land adjacent to the Dam was converted into State leasehold land with restrictions being imposed on land usage.

The locale of Framptons Road, Dundas has been used for commercial activity in the past. A small-scale saw mill was operated by a local farmer of the area from the 1950s to the 1960s. During the 1990s there was a horse riding school in operation at Framptons Road.

== Demographics ==
In the 2011 census, Dundas was counted within the larger area of Crossdale which had a population of 190 people.

In the 2016 census, Dundas had a population of 77 people.

In the 2021 census, Dundas had a population of 58 people.

== Education ==
There are no schools in Dundas. The nearest government primary schools are Fernvale State School in Fernvale to the south, Mount Nebo State School in Mount Nebo to the south-east, and Dayboro State School in Dayboro to the north-east. The nearest government secondary schools are Lowood State High School in Lowood to the south-west, Ferny Grove State High School in Ferny Grove to the south-east, and Bray Park State High School in Bray Park to the east.

== Attractions ==
Wivenhoe Outlook is a lookout on Mount Glorious Road (27.2967°S 152.7290°E). It has panoramic views of Lake Wivenhoe.
