= Laceys Creek, Queensland =

Laceys Creek
- Suburb
- Interactive map of Laceys Creek
- Coordinates: 27.2319°S 152.74°E
- Country: Australia
- State: Queensland
- LGA: City of Moreton Bay
- Location: 13.6 km (8.5 mi) WSW of Dayboro; 36.3 km (22.6 mi) NW of Strathpine; 59.4 km (36.9 mi) NW of Brisbane CBD

Government
  - State electorate: Pine Rivers
  - Federal division: Dickson

Area
  - Total: 89.9 km^{2} (34.7 sq mi)

Population
  - Total: 280 (2021 census)
  - Density: 3.11/km^{2} (8.07/sq mi)
- Time zone: UTC+10:00 (AEST)
- Postcode: 4521
Suburbs around Laceys Creek
Mount Byron	Mount Pleasant	Dayboro
Mount Byron	Laceys Creek	Armstrong Creek; Kobble Creek
Dundas	Dundas	Mount Glorious

Laceys Creek is a rural locality in the City of Moreton Bay, Queensland, Australia. In the 2021 census, Laceys Creek had a population of 280 people.

== History ==
The locality takes its name from the creek. The creek in turn was originally called Bullon Creek, but later changed to Leacys Creek, referring to John Leacy, the selector of Portion 117A, Parish of Samsonvale, on 17 April 1879. The current name is a corruption of Leacys.

Lacey's Creek Provisional School opened on 1 January 1898. On 1 January 1909, it became Lacey's Creek State School. It closed on 25 August 1963.(approx 27.2047°S 152.7451°E).

== Demographics ==
In the 2011 census, Laceys Creek recorded a population of 245 people, 45.7% female and 54.3% male. The median age of the Laceys Creek population was 41 years, 4 years above the national median of 37. 84.2% of people living in Laceys Creek were born in Australia. The other top responses for country of birth were England 4%, Germany 1.2%, Hungary 1.2%, New Zealand 1.2%, Papua New Guinea 1.2%. 95.5% of people spoke only English at home; 2% of people spoke Hungarian at home.

In the 2016 census, Laceys Creek had a population of 278 people.

In the 2021 census, Laceys Creek had a population of 280 people.

== Education ==
There are no schools in Laceys Creek. The nearest government primary school is Dayboro State School in neighbouring Dayboro to the north-east. The nearest government secondary schools are Bray Park State High School (to Year 12) in Bray Park to the east, Ferny Grove State High School (to Year 12) in Ferny Grove to the south-east, and Woodford State School (to Year 10) in Woodford to the north.
