= Armstrong Creek, Queensland =

Armstrong Creek Queensland
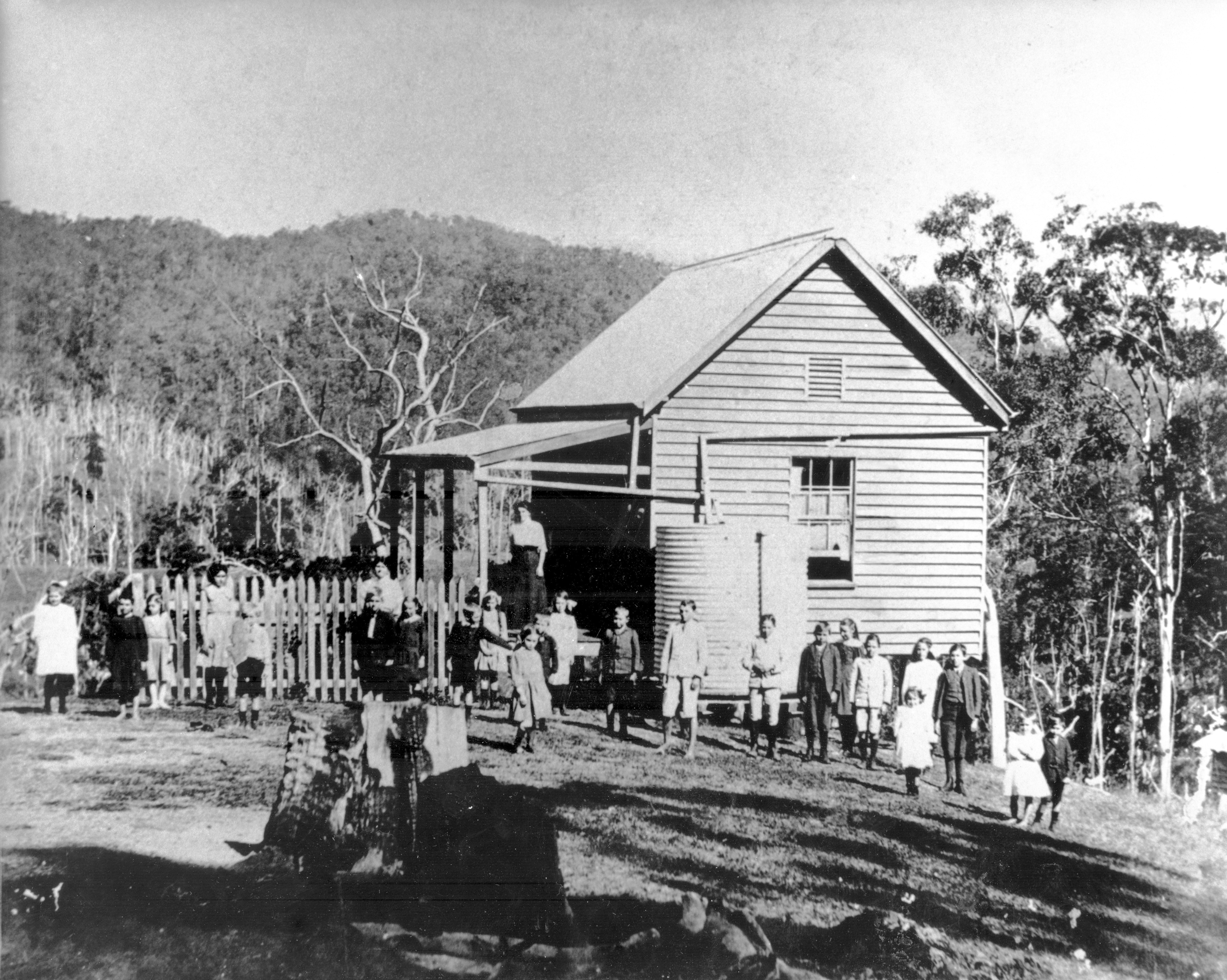
- Armstrong Creek School (1900-1919)

- Coordinates: 27.2177°S 152.7930°E
- Population: 328 (2021 census)
  - Density: 13.33/km^{2} (34.53/sq mi)
- Postcode(s): 4520
- Area: 24.6 km^{2} (9.5 sq mi)
- Time zone: AEST (UTC+10:00)
- Location: 2.8 km (2 mi) S of Dayboro; 24.7 km (15 mi) NW of Bray Park; 25.5 km (16 mi) NW of Strathpine; 44.1 km (27 mi) NNW of Brisbane CBD
- LGA(s): City of Moreton Bay
- State electorate(s): Pine Rivers
- Federal division(s): Dickson
Suburbs around Armstrong Creek:
Laceys Creek	Laceys Creek	Dayboro
Laceys Creek	Armstrong Creek	Samsonvale
Laceys Creek	Kobble Creek	Kobble Creek

Armstrong Creek is a rural locality in the City of Moreton Bay, Queensland, Australia. In the 2021 census, Armstrong Creek had a population of 328 people.

== Geography ==
The North Pine River forms a portion of the northeastern boundary.

D'Aguilar National Park protects a section of forest in the west, where the D'Aguilar Range rises to elevations greater than 500 metres (1,600 ft). Apart from the protected area, the predominant land use is grazing on native vegetation with some horticulture.

== History ==
Armstrong Creek Provisional School opened circa February 1900. On 1 January 1909, it became Armstrong Creek State School. It closed on 30 March 1919. The school building was relocated to establish the school in Ocean View.

Armstrong Creek railway station was at 27.21972°S 152.83306°E. It was on the final segment of the Dayboro railway line which opened on 25 September 1920. Railmotor services commenced on the line in 1931 and Amstrong Creek was a popular excursion for picnics. The railway line through Armstrong Creek closed on 1 July 1955.

== Demographics ==
In the 2011 census, Armstrong Creek had a population of 373 people.

In the 2016 census, Armstrong Creek had a population of 325 people.

In the 2021 census, Armstrong Creek had a population of 328 people.

== Education ==
There are no schools in Armstrong Creek. The nearest government primary school is Dayboro State School in neighbouring Dayboro to the north-east. The nearest government secondary school is Bray Park State High School in Bray Park to the south-east.
