= Rush Creek, Queensland =

Rush Creek Queensland
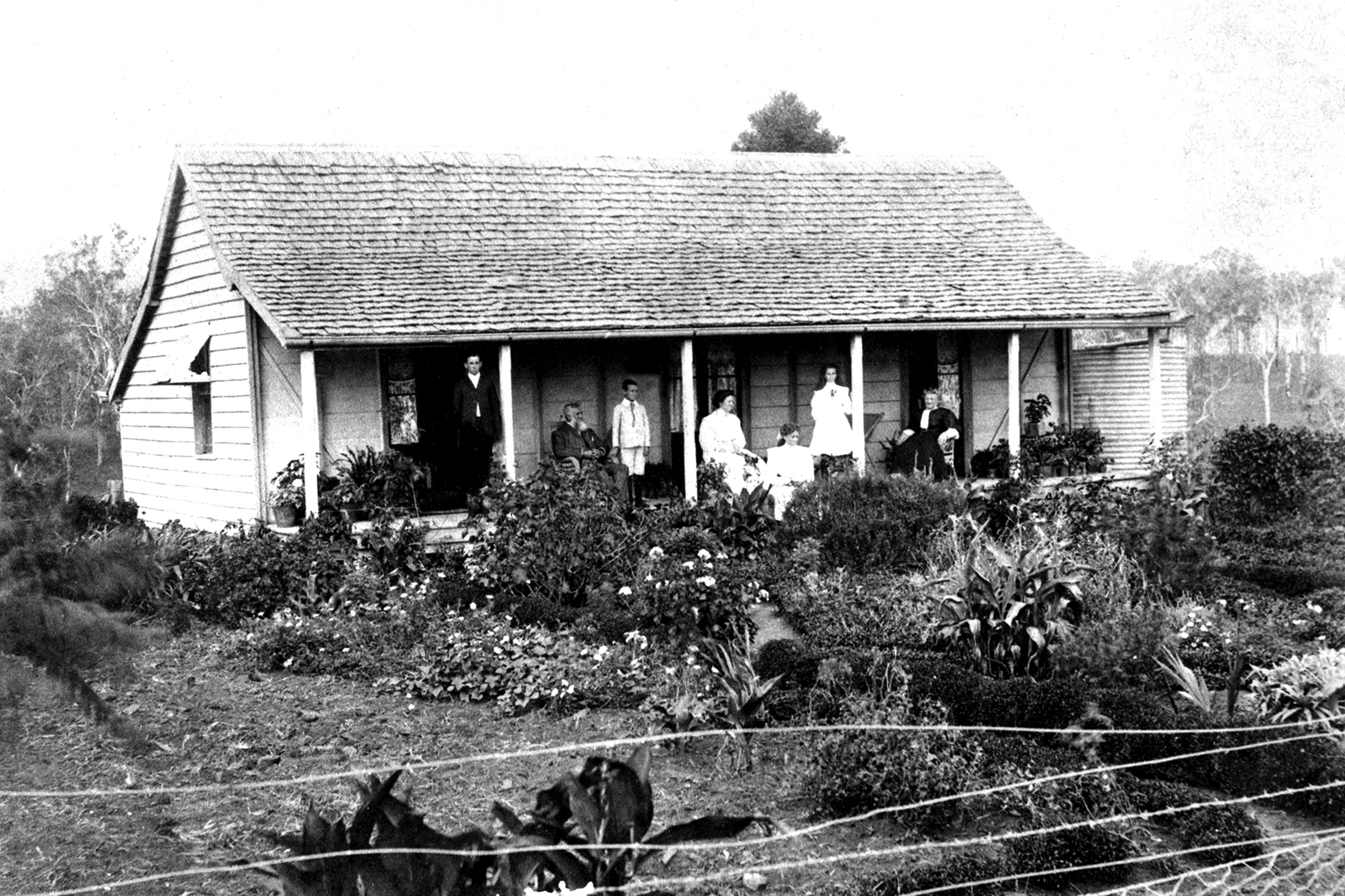
- Hay Cottage, farmhouse at Rush Creek, 1870s

- Coordinates: 27.2049°S 152.8666°E
- Population: 152 (2021 census)
  - Density: 10.86/km^{2} (28.12/sq mi)
- Postcode(s): 4521
- Area: 14.0 km^{2} (5.4 sq mi)
- Time zone: AEST (UTC+10:00)
- Location: 4.9 km (3 mi) SE of Dayboro; 17.8 km (11 mi) NW of Strathpine; 39.5 km (25 mi) NNW of Brisbane CBD
- LGA(s): City of Moreton Bay
- State electorate(s): Pine Rivers
- Federal division(s): Dickson
Suburbs around Rush Creek:
King Scrub	Narangba	Kurwongbah
Dayboro	Rush Creek	Kurwongbah
Dayboro	Samsonvale	Whiteside

Rush Creek is a rural locality in the City of Moreton Bay, Queensland, Australia. In the 2021 census, Rush Creek had a population of 152 people.

== Geography ==
The North Pine River at the western end of Lake Samsonvale marks the southern boundary of Rush Creek.

Forbes Creek is a neighbourhood in the south-east of the locality (27.2234°S 152.8852°E).

Brisbane–Woodford Road (Dayboro Road) runs through from east to west.

== History ==
Hay Cottage was originally built about 1870 by Ernest Goertz. The cottage later passed to Charles Hay who raised a family there. The construction of the North Pine Dam in the early 1970s required the resumption of the cottage's land. In 1989 the cottage was relocated to 27 William Street in Dayboro and is occupied by Hay Cottage Arts and Crafts Association Inc.

Forbes Creek Provisional School opened on 20 August 1880. On 1 January 1909, it became Forbes Creek State School. It closed in 1960. It was just north of the North Pine River in the vicinity of Rush Creek Road (approx 27.2219°S 152.8801°E); this area is now on the foreshores of Lake Samsonvale.

== Demographics ==
At the 2011 census, the locality and surrounds recorded a population of 497.

In the 2016 census, Rush Creek had a population of 157 people.

In the 2021 census, Rush Creek had a population of 152 people.

== Education ==
There are no schools in Rush Creek. The nearest government primary school is Dayboro State School in neighbouring Dayboro to the west. The nearest government secondary school is Bray Park State High School in Bray Park to the south-east.
