= King Scrub, Queensland =

King Scrub
- Suburb
- Interactive map of King Scrub
- Coordinates: 27.1680°S 152.8233°E
- Country: Australia
- State: Queensland
- City: Brisbane
- LGA: City of Moreton Bay
- Location: 23.2 km (14.4 mi) NW of Bray Park; 24.4 km (15.2 mi) NW of Strathpine; 47.6 km (29.6 mi) NNW of Brisbane CBD

Government
  - State electorate: Pine Rivers
  - Federal division: Dickson

Area
  - Total: 14.3 km^{2} (5.5 sq mi)

Population
  - Total: 363 (2021 census)
  - Density: 25.38/km^{2} (65.7/sq mi)
- Time zone: UTC+10:00 (AEST)
- Postcode: 4521
Suburbs around King Scrub
Mount Pleasant	Ocean View	Ocean View
Mount Pleasant	King Scrub	Rush Creek
Mount Pleasant	Dayboro	Dayboro

King Scrub is a rural locality in the City of Moreton Bay, Queensland, Australia. In the 2021 census, King Scrub had a population of 363 people. It is located on the northern outskirts of Dayboro.

== Geography ==
King Scrub has some areas of rich farmlands which are now being developed as estates. Currently the most dominant estates are Avalon Downs and Park Lands estate. Both developed in early 2000.

King Scrub has a road which often floods called Fingerboard Road. This road is used by the local weather station as a flood indicator. Fingerboard Road is an important transport artery for residents in Mount Mee and beyond as it avoids going through the Dayboro town centre.

Brisbane–Woodford Road (Mount Mee Road) runs through from south to north.

== History ==
Mayfield State School opened in 1910 and closed circa 1936. It was located on Mount Mee Road (27.1702°S 152.8259°E).

== Demographics ==
In the 2011 census, King Scrub recorded a population of 497 people, 49.1% female and 50.9% male. The median age of the King Scrub population was 39 years, 2 years above the national median of 37. 83.9% of people living in King Scrub were born in Australia. The other top responses for country of birth were England 6.5%, Canada 0.8%, Indonesia 0.8%, Jersey 0.6%, Ireland 0.6%. 95.4% of people spoke only English at home; the next most common languages were 0.6% Dutch, 0.6% French, 0% Welsh, 0% Irish, 0% Gaelic (Scotland).

In the 2016 census, King Scrub had a population of 348 people.

In the 2021 census, King Scrub had a population of 363 people.

== Education ==
There are no schools in King Scrub. The nearest government primary school is Dayboro State School in neighbouring Dayboro to the south. The nearest government secondary school is Bray Park State High School in Bray Park to the south-east.
