= Castleholme Homestead =

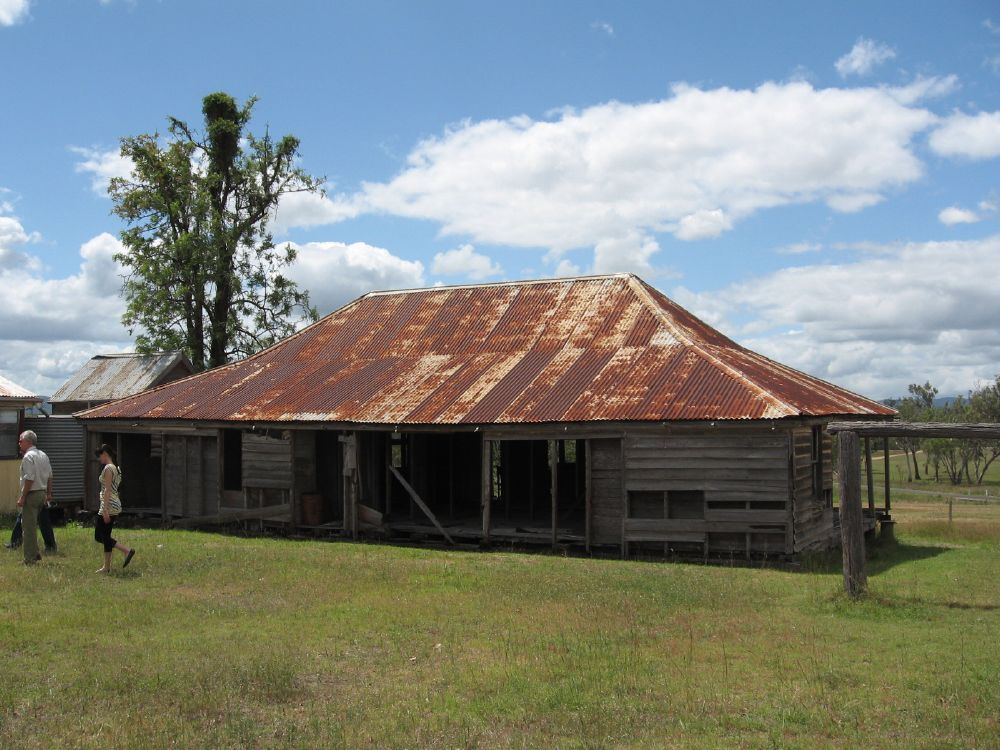
- Castleholme Homestead, 1979

- Location within Queensland Location within Australia
- 27.2423°S 152.5691°E
- Location: Bryden - Crossdale Road, Bryden, Somerset Region, Queensland, Australia

History
- Design period: 1870s - 1890s (late 19th century)
- Built: c. 1875 - 1950s

Queensland Heritage Register
- Official name: Castleholme Homestead, Conroy's Farm
- Type: state heritage (built, landscape)
- Designated: 21 October 1992
- Reference no.: 600491
- Significant period: 1870s-1890s (historical); 1870s-1890s (fabric)
- Significant components: residential accommodation - workers' quarters, shed - hay, out building/s, stables, shed/s, fencing, barn, cow bails, yards - livestock, residential accommodation - main house

Castleholme Homestead is a heritage-listed homestead at Bryden-Crossdale Road, Bryden, Somerset Region, Queensland, Australia. It was built from c. 1875 to the 1950s. It is also known as Conroy's Farm. It was added to the Queensland Heritage Register on 21 October 1992.

== History ==
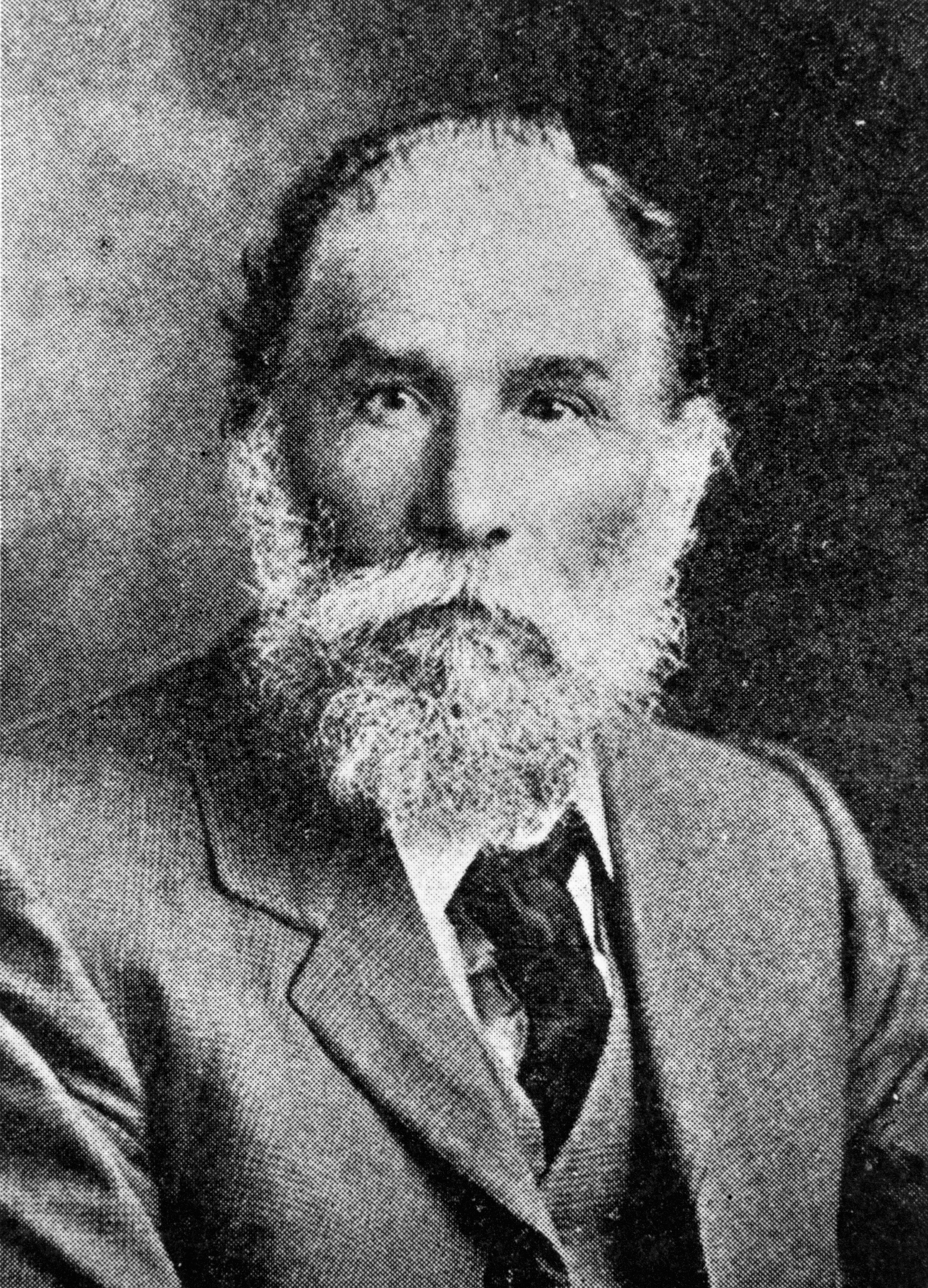
Hugh Conroy

Castleholme was established in the 1870s, following Hugh Conroy's selection and purchase of the then 257-hectare (640-acre) property in 1875. By 1916 a small cedar dwelling at Castleholme had become a rambling, fourteen-roomed house with wide verandahs. By that time the grounds included flowerbeds, shrubs and shade trees, and substantial outbuildings, and the principal activity was dairying. Castleholme remained in the Conroy family until 1978 when it became part of the Wivenhoe Dam reclamation area.

== Description ==
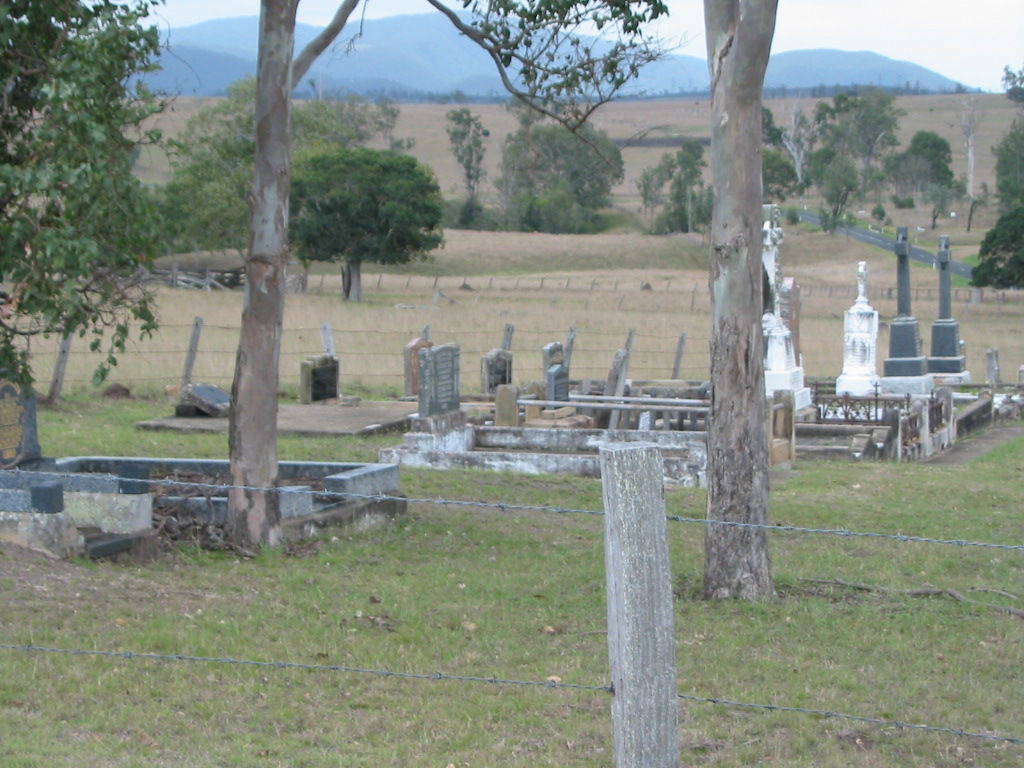
Bryden cemetery

Castleholme consists of the remains of a homestead, slab barn, cottage, stables and associated farm buildings and stockyards with a number of mature trees. It is located in the Brisbane Valley on a northeastern slope, is visible from the Bryden-Crossdale Road and borders the Bryden Catholic Cemetery. The domestic structures are located in a group to the north with the outbuildings forming a southern boundary. Other structures include the remains of a timber laundry shed and a bakehouse, post and rail fencing, a calf pen and cow bails.

== Heritage listing ==
Castleholme Homestead was listed on the Queensland Heritage Register on 21 October 1992 having satisfied the following criteria.

The place is important in demonstrating the evolution or pattern of Queensland's history.

Castleholme is important for its association with the closer settlement of the Bryden area, its development as a dairying district, and with the Conroy family in particular.

The place has potential to yield information that will contribute to an understanding of Queensland's history.

The place also has potential to reveal substrata evidence of the arrangement of a late 19th century dairy farm.

The place is important in demonstrating the principal characteristics of a particular class of cultural places.

It survives as a good example of the arrangement of a working farm in southeast Queensland, demonstrating over a century an evolution in function, building type, technology and material.

The place is important because of its aesthetic significance.

Castleholme is significant also for the aesthetic quality of the group of timber buildings and grounds, and for its spatial association with the adjacent St Anne's graveyard.

The place has a special association with the life or work of a particular person, group or organisation of importance in Queensland's history.

Castleholme is significant for its historical association with the adjacent St Anne's graveyard.
