= Bryden, Queensland =

Bryden
- Suburb
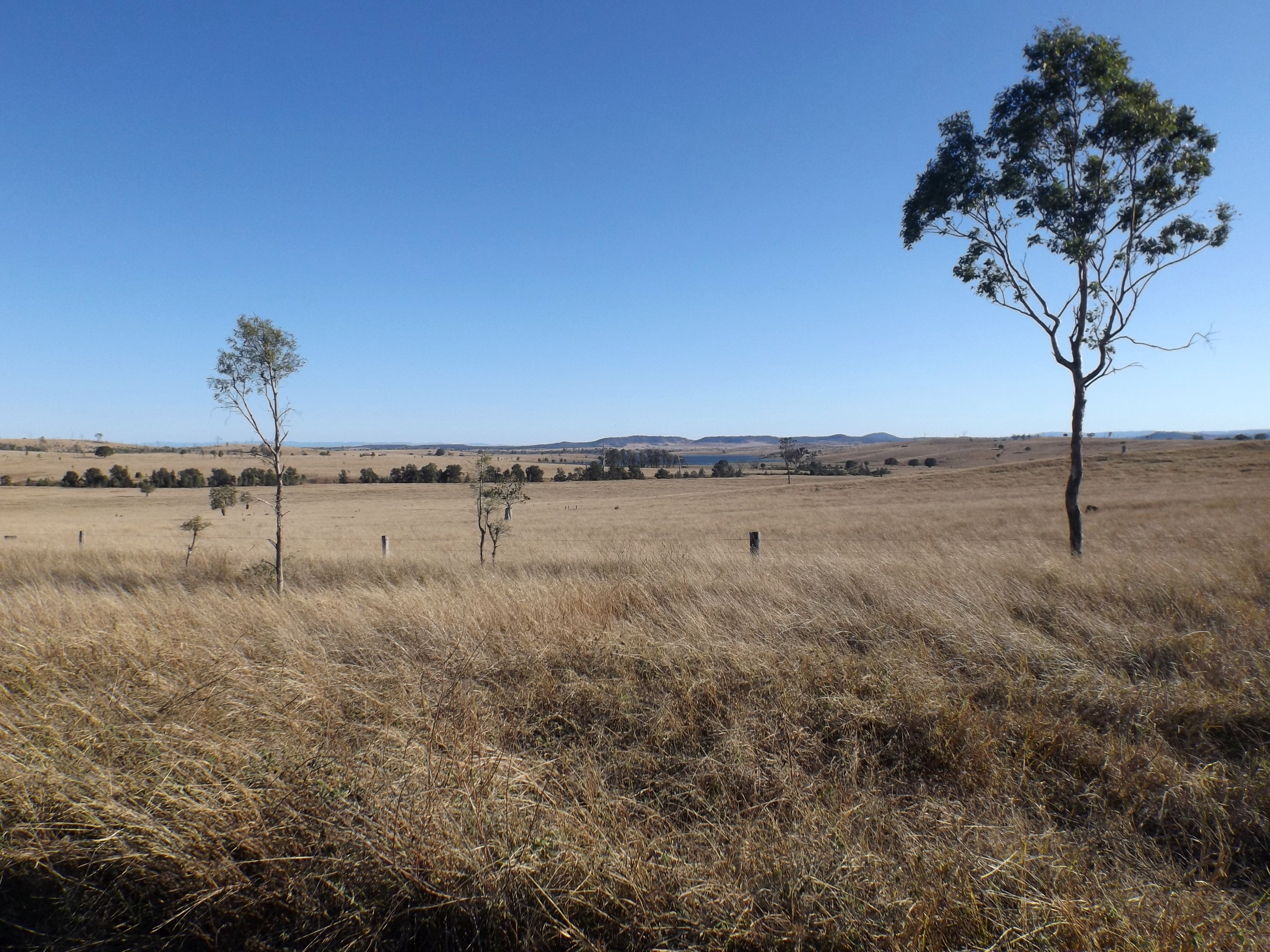
- Paddocks along Corcorans Road, 2015

- Interactive map of Bryden
- Coordinates: 27.2319°S 152.6011°E
- Country: Australia
- State: Queensland
- LGA: Somerset Region
- Location: 27.3 km (17.0 mi) N of Fernvale; 41.5 km (25.8 mi) E of Esk; 51.9 km (32.2 mi) NNW of Ipswich; 72.4 km (45.0 mi) NW of Brisbane CBD

Government
  - State electorate: Nanango
  - Federal division: Blair

Area
  - Total: 79.0 km^{2} (30.5 sq mi)

Population
  - Total: 22 (2021 census)
  - Density: 0.278/km^{2} (0.721/sq mi)
- Time zone: UTC+10:00 (AEST)
- Postcode: 4312
Suburbs around Bryden
Crossdale	Crossdale; Mount Byron	Mount Byron
Lake Wivenhoe	Bryden	Dundas
Lake Wivenhoe	Lake Wivenhoe	Dundas

Bryden is a rural locality in the Somerset Region of Queensland, Australia, approximately 50 kilometres north-west of the state capital, Brisbane. In the 2021 census, Bryden had a population of 22 people.

== Geography ==
The east of Bryden contains undeveloped bushland on the western slopes of the D'Aguilar Range.

== History ==
The original inhabitants of the Bryden area were the indigenous Wakka Wakka people. The name Bryden comes from the name of the first European settler in the area, which was originally named Deep Creek.

On 17 April 1876, the Mount Brisbane Provisional School opened in a bark hut built for free by Carl Blank. There was an initial enrolment of 26 students with one teacher, Mr Goodwin. In 1879, it became Mount Brisbane State School. In 1893, it was renamed Deep Creek State School and, in 1930, it was renamed Bryden State School.

From 1929, low students numbers caused a number of temporary closures, shared teacher arrangements with Dundas State School, and correspondence school arrangements. In 1936, all teaching ceased at the school. On 14 April 1947, the school reopened as Bryden Provisional School, which closed on 13 May 1963. It was on a 3-acre (1.2 ha) site on Loughrans Road (27.2696°S 152.5827°E).

On Sunday 19 August 1900, the foundation stone was laid for a Catholic church by Reverend Father Ryan. On Sunday 17 February 1901, the church was officially opened and dedicated as St Anne's Catholic Church by Ryan, because Archbishop Dunne was unable to attend. The church with a cemetery at the rear was on a 2-acre (0.81 ha) site at 2479 Wivenhoe Somerset Road (corner of Corcorans Road, 27.2435°S 152.5709°E). The church is no longer extant but the cemetery remains.

On Sunday 18 December 1927, the Bryden Hall burned down after having been used on Saturday night. The new Bryden Hall was officially opened on Saturday 1 September 1928 by Ernest Grimstone, the local Member of the Queensland Legislative Assembly. In 1980, the hall was relocated to the Esk Showgrounds.

== Demographics ==
In the 2011 census, Bryden was included in the population statistics for a wider area including Crossdale, which recorded a population of 190.

In the 2016 census, Bryden had a population of 33 people.

In the 2021 census, Bryden had a population of 22 people.

== Heritage listings ==
Bryden has a number of heritage-listed sites, including Castleholme Homestead along Bryden-Crossdale Road.

== Education ==
There are no schools in Bryden. The nearest government primary schools are Fernvale State School in Fernvale to the souths and Toogoolawah State School in Toogoolawah to the north-west. The nearest government secondary schools are Lowood State High School in Lowood to the south and Toogoolawah State High School in Toogoolawah to the north-west.

== Facilities ==
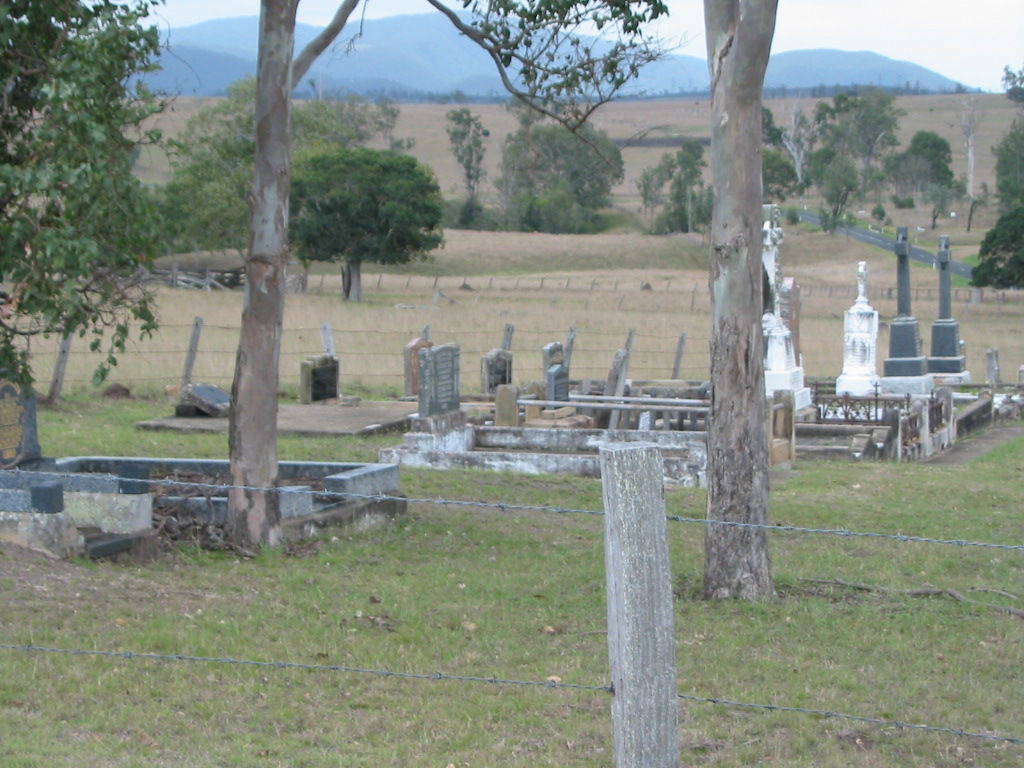
Bryden cemetery

There is a Catholic cemetery 2479 Wivenhoe Somerset Road (corner of Corcorans Road, 27.2433°S 152.5703°E) behind the former Catholic Church and adjacent to the Castleholme Homestead.
