= Crossdale, Queensland =

Crossdale
- Suburb
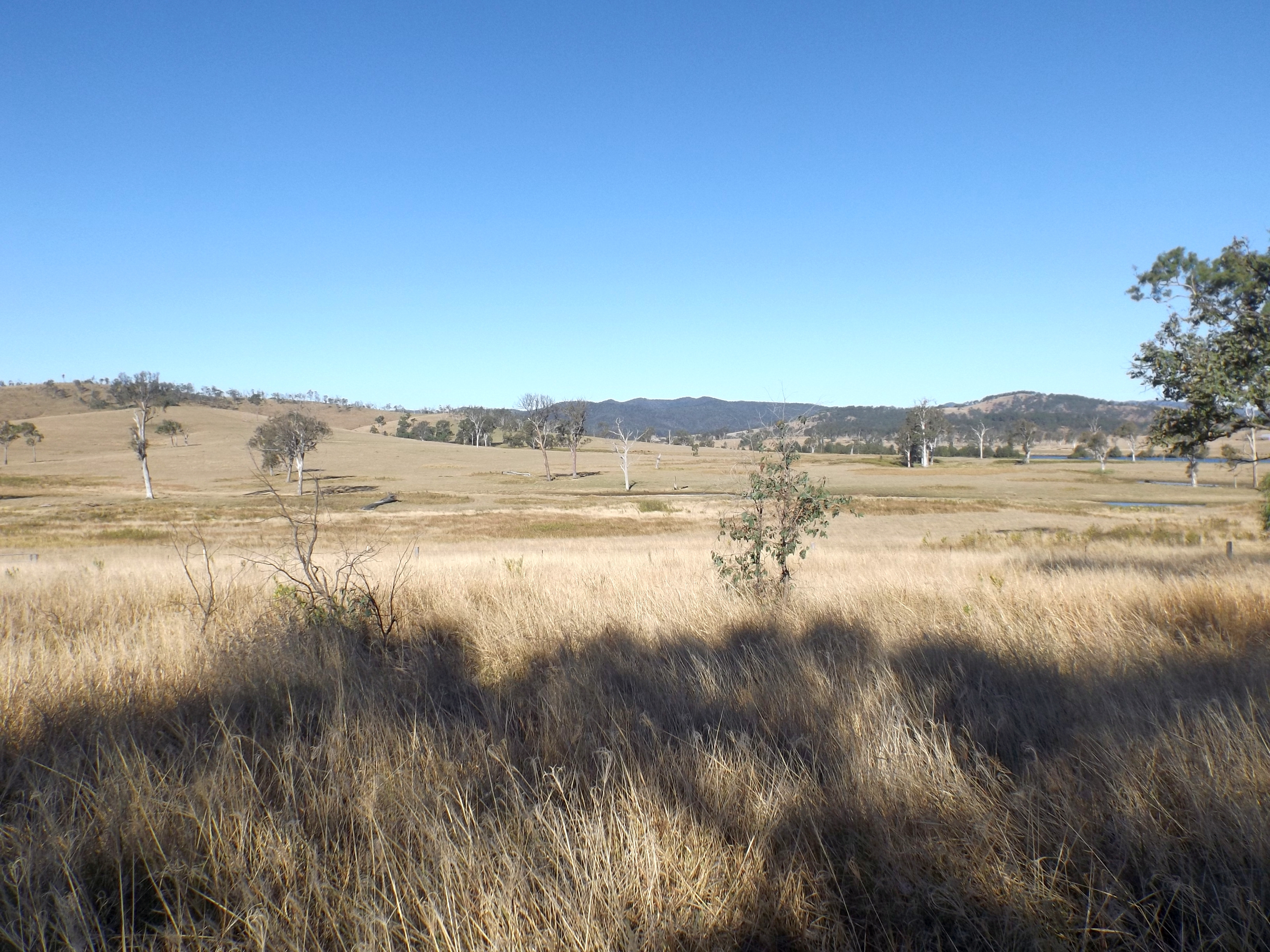
- Paddocks along Wivenhoe Somerset Dam Road, 2015

- Interactive map of Crossdale
- Coordinates: 27.1819°S 152.5511°E
- Country: Australia
- State: Queensland
- LGA: Somerset Region
- Location: 33.5 km (20.8 mi) ENE of Esk; 33.9 km (21.1 mi) E of Toogoolawah; 38.8 km (24.1 mi) S of Kilcoy; 44.8 km (27.8 mi) NNW of Fernvale; 88.1 km (54.7 mi) NW of Brisbane

Government
  - State electorate: Nanango
  - Federal division: Blair

Area
  - Total: 114.0 km^{2} (44.0 sq mi)

Population
  - Total: 68 (2021 census)
  - Density: 0.596/km^{2} (1.545/sq mi)
- Time zone: UTC+10:00 (AEST)
- Postcode: 4312
Suburbs around Crossdale
Hazeldean	Westvale	Mount Byron
Somerset Dam; Lake Wivenhoe	Crossdale	Mount Byron; Bryden
Lake Wivenhoe	Lake Wivenhoe	Bryden

Crossdale is a rural locality in the Somerset Region, Queensland, Australia. In the 2021 census, Crossdale had a population of 68 people.

== Geography ==
Part of the western boundary of Crossdale follows the Stanley River. Some of the waters of Somerset Dam are within the locality. Crossdale is relatively large and has a diverse topography. In the north east the elevations rises along the north of the D'Aguilar Range. Little Mount Brisbane is located close to the Somerset Dam wall. In the south another hilly area reaches heights greater than 300 m around McKey Hill. A majority of the locality is devoid of vegetation although the slopes remain covered by bushland.

The north-western part of the locality is not accessible to the public, being almost entirely surrounded by the waters of Lake Wivenhoe, the impoundment of the Brisbane River by Wivenhoe Dam. Prior to the construction of the dam, this area was known as Mount Esk Pocket (27.17477°S 152.48967°E).

== History ==
Mount Esk Pocket State School opened on 19 July 1911. It closed in December 1967. It was located on the north-eastern corner of the junction of two now-unnamed roads (27.17507°S 152.49080°E).

== Demographics ==
In the 2011 census, Crossdale and nearby localities had a population of 190 people.

In the 2016 census, Crossdale had a population of 75 people.

In the 2021 census, Crossdale had a population of 68 people.

== Education ==
There are no schools in Crossdale. The nearest government primary schools are Toogoolawah State School in Toogoolawah to the west and Fernvale State School in Fernvale to the south-west. The nearest government secondary schools are Toogoolawah State High School in Toogoolawah to the west and Kilcoy State High School in Kilcoy to the north.

== Facilities ==
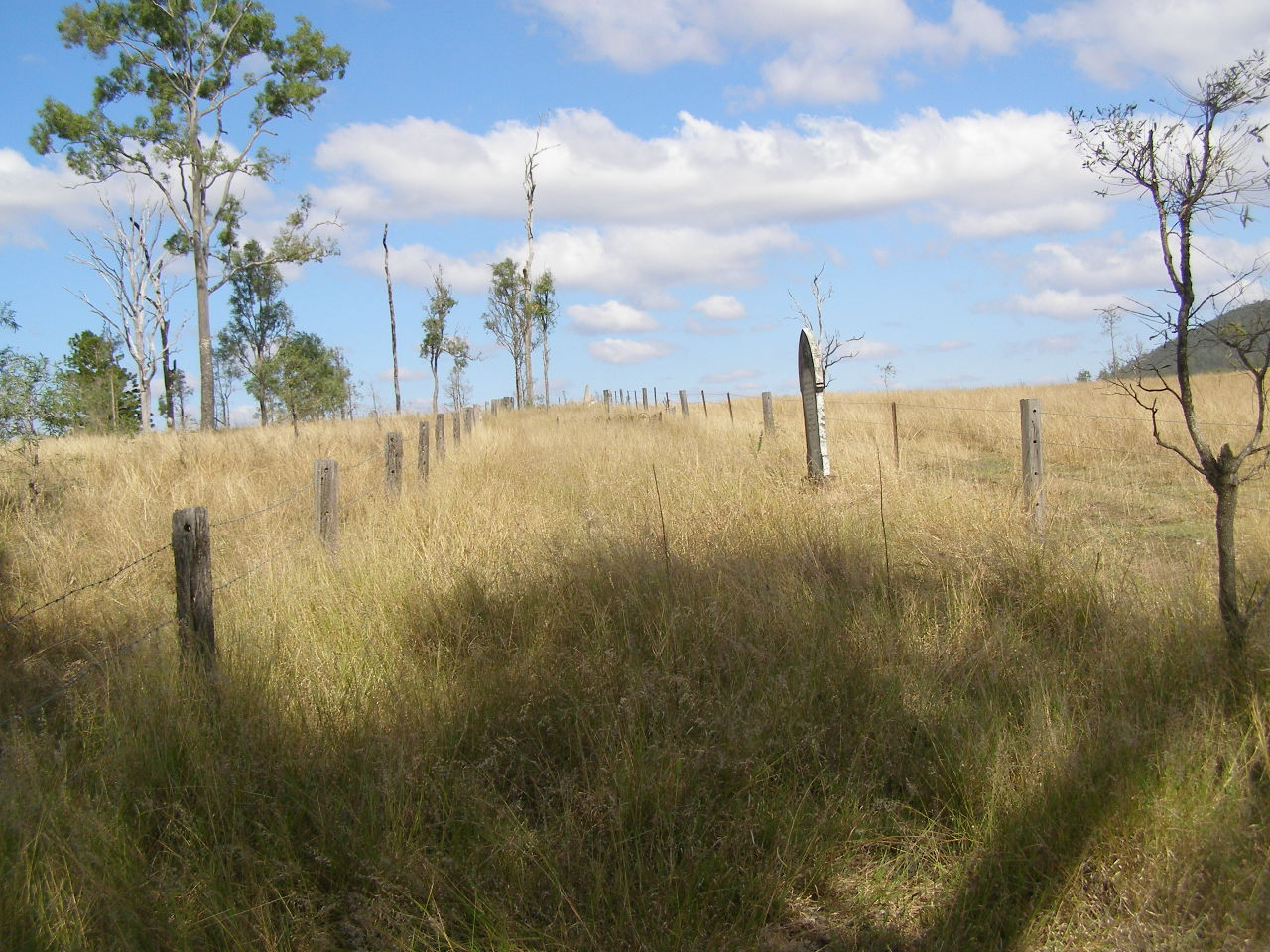
Bryden-Fairview cemetery, 2010

Bryden-Fairview Cemetery is at 2959 Wivenhoe Somerset Road down a 300-metre (980 ft) access road (27.2048°S 152.5541°E).
