= Mount Pleasant, Queensland (Moreton Bay) =

Mount Pleasant Queensland
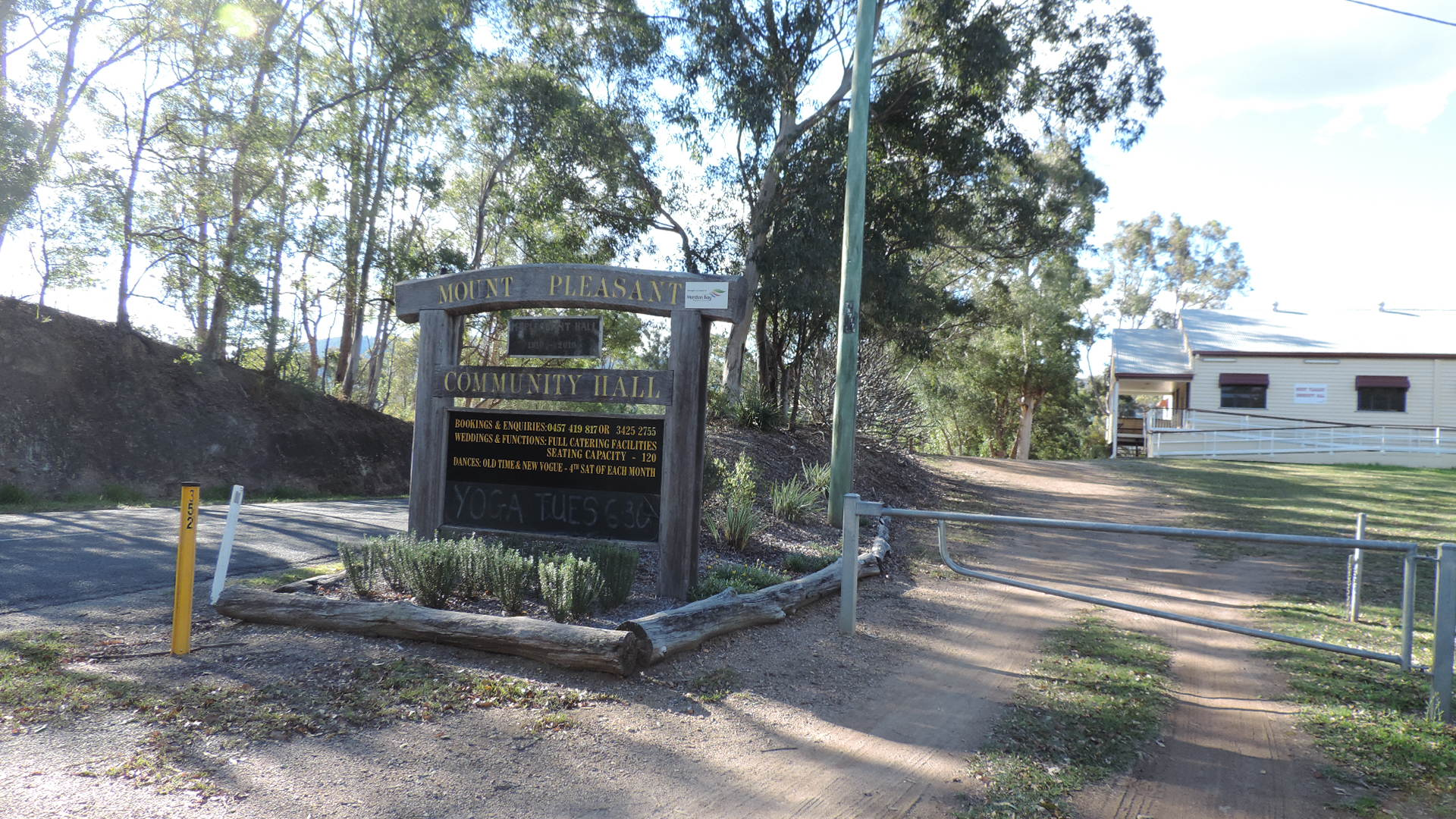
- Mount Pleasant Public Hall, 2020

- Coordinates: 27.1477°S 152.7827°E
- Population: 390 (2021 census)
  - Density: 10.51/km^{2} (27.2/sq mi)
- Postcode(s): 4521
- Area: 37.1 km^{2} (14.3 sq mi)
- Time zone: AEST (UTC+10:00)
- Location: 31.9 km (20 mi) NW of Strathpine; 53.6 km (33 mi) NNW of Brisbane CBD
- LGA(s): City of Moreton Bay
- State electorate(s): Pine Rivers
- Federal division(s): Dickson
Suburbs around Mount Pleasant:
Mount Byron	Mount Mee	Ocean View
Mount Byron	Mount Pleasant	King Scrub
Mount Byron	Laceys Creek	Dayboro

Mount Pleasant is a rural locality in the City of Moreton Bay, Queensland, Australia. In the 2021 census, Mount Pleasant had a population of 390 people.

== Geography ==
The locality presumably takes its name from the mountain Mount Pleasant which is just beyond on north-east boundary of the locality in the neighbouring locality of Ocean View (27.15°S 152.7667°E). It rises to a height 525 metres (1,722 ft) and is part of the D'Aguilar Range.

== History ==
Upper North Pine Provisional School opened in late 1880. It closed following the dismissal of teacher Mr Storey, re-opening circa July 1887 with a new teacher, Mr E. Sinclair. On 1 January 1909, it became Upper North Pine State School. It closed in February 1942. It was on Mount Pleasant Road (27.1759°S 152.7970°E).

Mount Pleasant Provisional School opened on 28 August 1905. On 1 January 1909, it became Mount Pleasant State School. It closed in 1965. It was at approx 259 Mount Brisbane Road (27.1495°S 152.7699°E).

In April 1920, the Upper North Pine Honour Roll was unveiled in the Mount Pleasant School of Arts by Richard Warren, the Member of the Queensland Legislative Assembly for Murrumba. The roll has the names of the 26 World War I servicemen from the Mount Pleasant and Lacey Creek districts; nine of them died in the war.

== Demographics ==
In the 2011 census, Mount Pleasant recorded a population of 304 people, 49% female and 51% male. The median age of the Mount Pleasant population was 37 years, the same as the national median. 86.5% of people living in Mount Pleasant were born in Australia. The other top responses for country of birth were England 6.6%, New Zealand 3%, Canada 1.7%, Belgium 1%. 97.7% of people spoke only English at home.

In the 2016 census, Mount Pleasant had a population of 332 people.

In the 2021 census, Mount Pleasant had a population of 390 people.

== Education ==
There are no schools in Mount Pleasant. The nearest government primary schools are Dayboro State School in neighbouring Dayboro to the south-east and Mount Mee State School in neighbouring Mount Mee to the north. The nearest government secondary school is Bray Park State High School in Bray Park to the south-east.

== Amenities ==
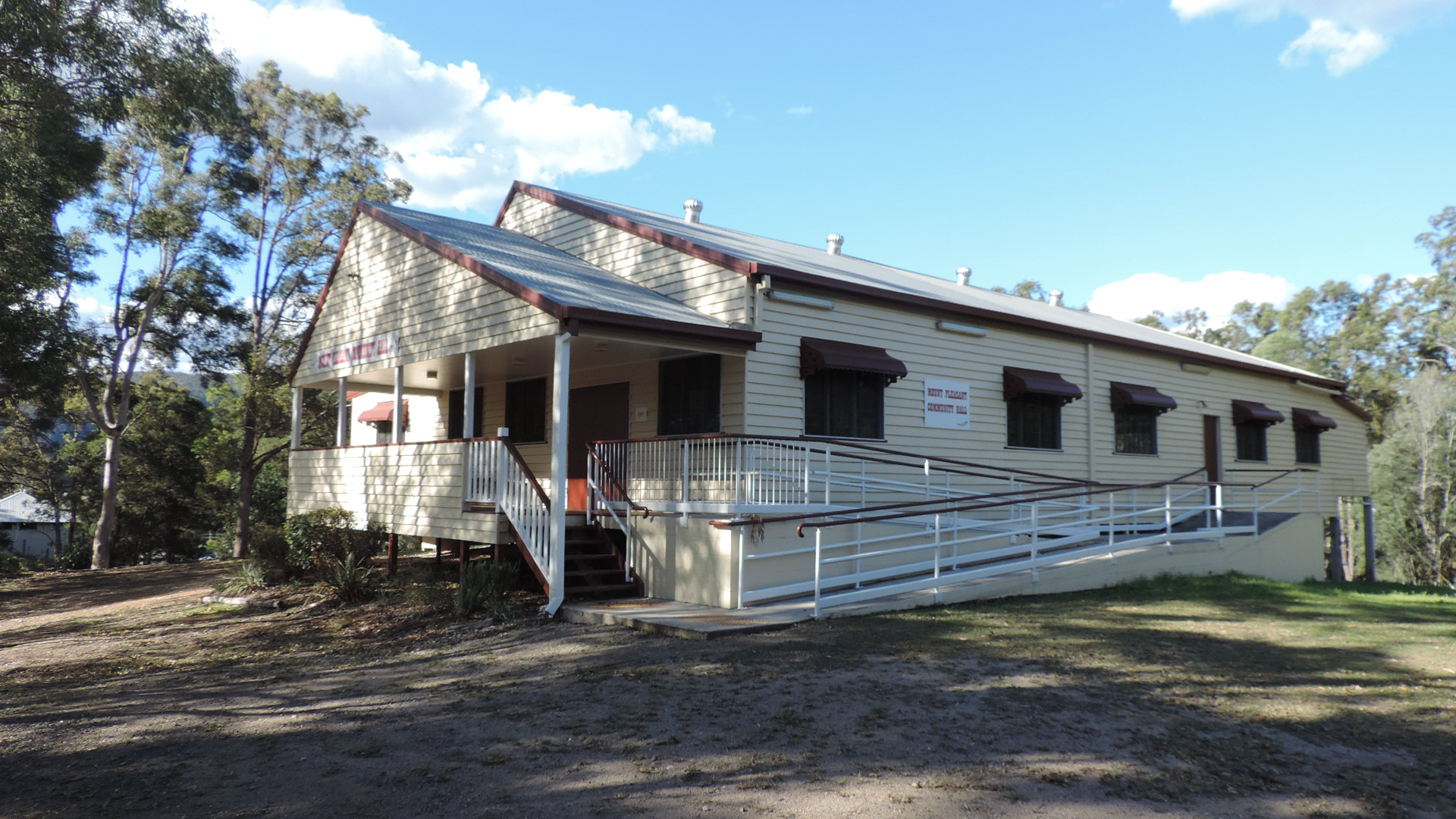
Mount Pleasant Public Hall, 2020

Mount Pleasant Community Hall (formerly Mount Pleasant Public Hall & School of Arts) is at 352 Mount Pleasant Road (27.16550°S 152.78390°E).
