= North Pine Dam =

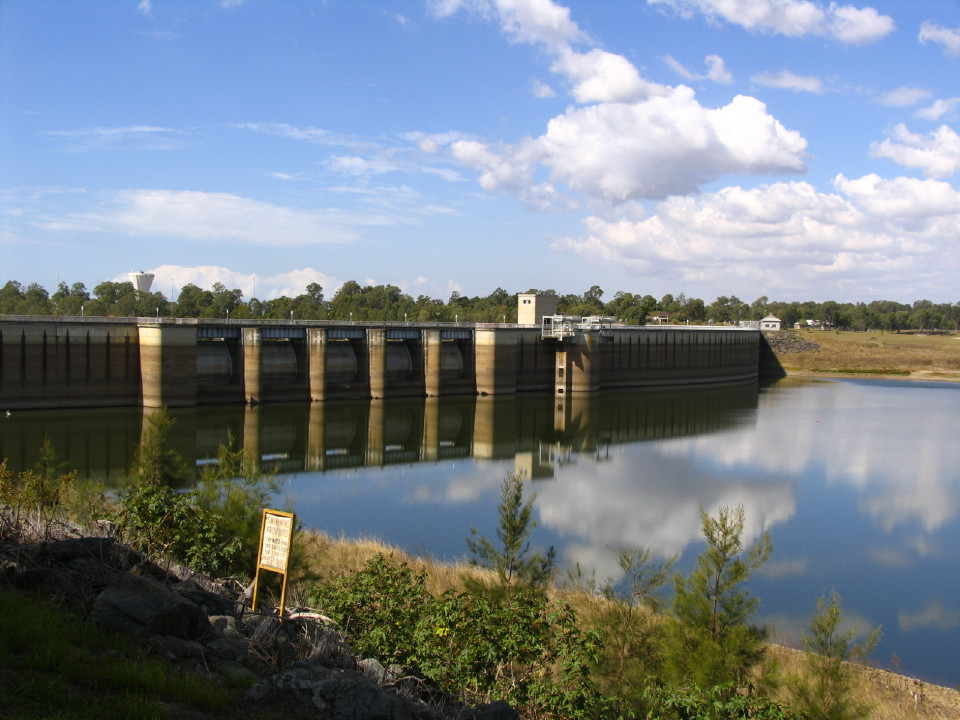
- The dam wall in 2006; the reservoir was 27% of capacity

- Location of the dam in Queensland
- Interactive map of North Pine Dam
- Country: Australia
- Location: South East Queensland
- Coordinates: 27°15′48″S 152°56′12″E
- Purpose: Potable water supply
- Status: Operational
- Opening date: 12 August 1976
- Construction cost: A$20 million
- Operator: SEQ Water

Dam and spillways
- Type of dam: Gravity dam
- Impounds: North Pine River
- Height: 45 m (148 ft)
- Length: 1,375 m (4,511 ft)
- Dam volume: 450×10^{3} m^{3} (16×10^{6} cu ft)
- Spillways: 5
- Spillway type: Controlled
- Spillway capacity: 3,700 m^{3}/s (130,000 cu ft/s)

Reservoir
- Creates: Lake Samsonvale
- Total capacity: 214,302 ML (173,737 acre⋅ft)
- Catchment area: 348 km^{2} (134 sq mi)
- Surface area: 2,200 ha (5,400 acres)
- Normal elevation: 39.63 m (130.0 ft) AHD
- Website seqwater.com.au

The North Pine Dam is a mass concrete gravity dam with earth-fill embankments on abutments across the North Pine River, located in south-east Queensland, Australia. The main purpose of the dam is for supply of potable water for the City of Moreton Bay and Brisbane's northern suburbs. The impounded reservoir is called Lake Samsonvale.

== Location and features ==
The dam is located north-west of Brisbane, within the City of Moreton Bay, at Joyner, near the localities of Whiteside and Petrie.

The North Pine Dam was designed by the Department of Local Government, with the Co-ordinator General's Department supervising construction contracts headed by Transfield. The cost of the dam was A$20 million, and the dam was opened on 12 August 1976 by the Lord Mayor of Brisbane City Council, Alderman Frank Sleeman.

The concrete dam structure is 45 metres (148 ft) high and 1,375 metres (4,511 ft) long. The 450-thousand-cubic-metre (16×10^{6} cu ft) dam wall holds back the 215,000-megalitre (174,000 acre⋅ft) reservoir when at full capacity. From a catchment area of 347 square kilometres (134 sq mi) that includes much of the south–eastern slopes of the D'Aguilar National Park, the dam creates Lake Samsonvale at an elevation of 39.63 m (130.0 ft) above sea level, with a surface area of 2,180 hectares (5,400 acres). The gated spillway, with five steel gates, has a discharge capacity of 3,700 cubic metres per second (130,000 cu ft/s).

Initially managed by the Brisbane City Council and then SunWater, management of the dam was transferred to SEQ Water in July 2008 as part of a water security project in the South East Queensland region, known as the SEQ Water Grid. The accompanying water treatment plant is also managed by SEQ Water.

Prior to the initial flooding of the valley, many of the surrounding grazing and dairy farms were compulsorily acquired, and the only evidence of these farms is now the names of roads leading to the lake's shoreline, such as Winn Road and Golds Scrub Lane. Golds Scrub Lane now leads only to the Samsonvale Cemetery; prior to the flooding of the dam, the site was also home to a church and a post office. To allow for the dam's flooding, 27 kilometres (17 mi) of road had to be relocated and rebuilt.

In May 2007, the dam, which was providing approximately 100 megalitres (22,000×10^{3} imp gal; 26,000×10^{3} US gal) per day or 20% of the region's water supply, was taken offline as a safety precaution. The drought in Australia caused water levels to drop to 14% capacity, the lowest since it was built. The cessation of water supply was meant to protect the dam from potential blue green algae blooms in the coming summer months. The operators continued to release between 8–10 megalitres (1.8×10^{6}–2.2×10^{6} imp gal; 2.1×10^{6}–2.6×10^{6} US gal) per day to service the North Pine River.

=== Flood mitigation ===
The North Pine Dam was designed with little flood mitigation capacity in mind, being designed only for water storage. As such, during flood seasons the location of the dam spillway causes the flooding and closure of Youngs Crossing Road. Flood conditions last affected the dam catchment in October 2010, and prior to that 1991, 1989 and 2000 & 2009. The dam wall is also one of the few in Queensland to be located upstream of a large urban area, and in the event of overtopping or dam failure, Geoscience Australia suggests that the downstream urban population would be flooded within three hours.

== Recreational uses ==
Recreational use of the lake and its surrounding bushland reserve is severely limited, with prohibited recreational activities including swimming, water skiing, diving, mountain biking, horse riding, canoeing and kayaking, camping, and bushwalking. Picnic facilities are available at four locations around the dam, with access prohibited outside of daylight hours.

=== Fishing ===
For many years fishing was banned in the dam. Lake Samsonvale has been stocked by Pine Rivers Fish Stocking Association www.prfma.com.au with fresh water fish, including spangled perch, snub-nosed garfish, golden perch, silver perch, eastern freshwater cod, saratoga and Australian bass, with varying levels of success. The dam is also home to the noxious species tilapia which is a fine eating sportfish in its larger sizes but tends to overpopulate and stunt if uncontrolled, as well as a population of Australian red claw crayfish, usually native only to Northern Queensland. Both the tilapia and red claw species are the target of considerable local effort for their capture and complete removal.

Like various other Queensland freshwater fisheries, a stocked impoundment permit is required to fish in North Pine Dam.

=== Boating ===
All boating on the lake is prohibited except through two groups. The Lake Samsonvale Water Sports Association and the stocking group Pine Rivers Fish Stocking Association have 300 permits to release each year for non petrol powered craft to members of the public for a small licence fee

== See also ==
- List of dams in Queensland
