= Dayboro, Queensland =

Dayboro Queensland
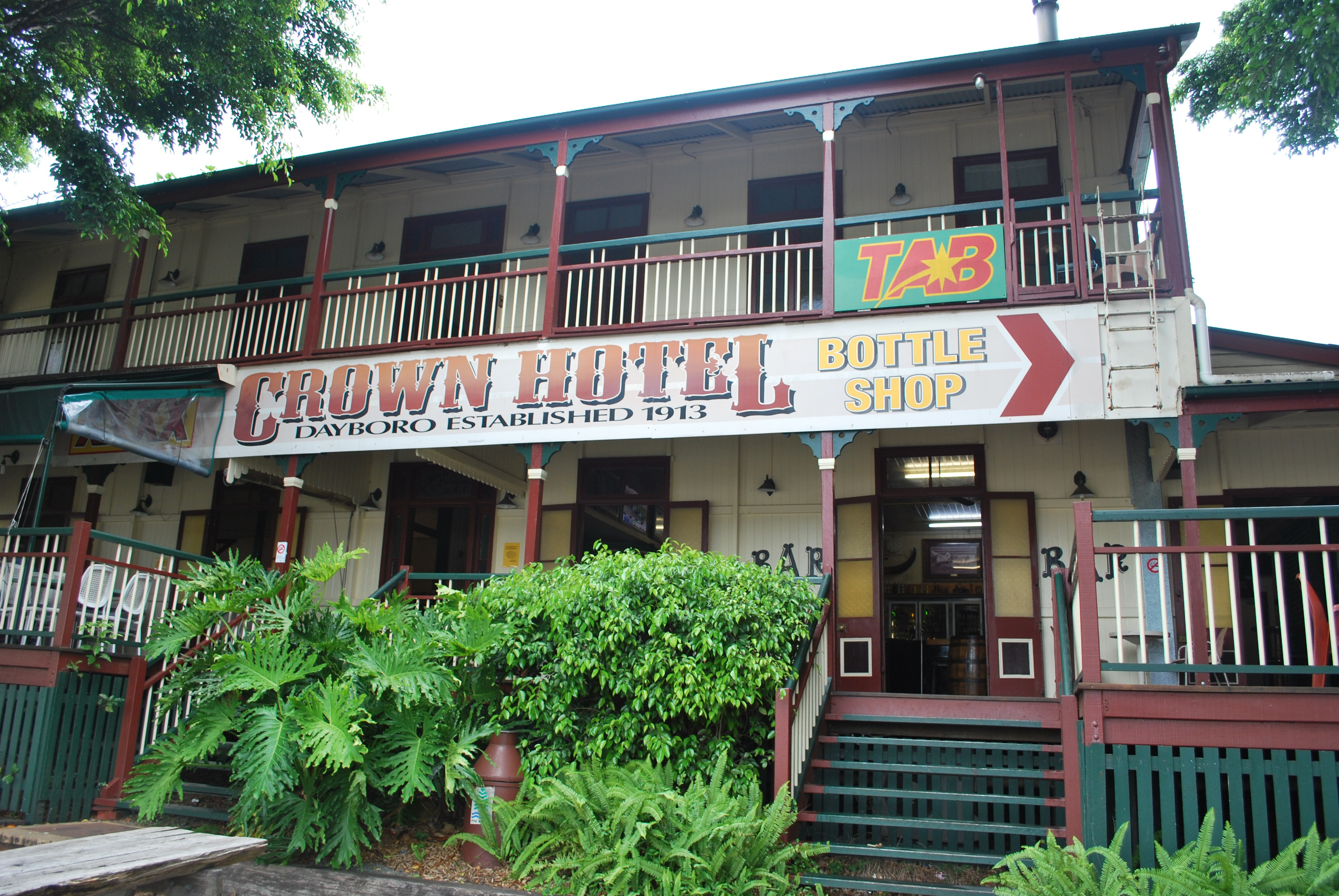
- Crown Hotel

- Coordinates: 27.1969°S 152.8227°E
- Population: 2,376 (2021 census)
  - Density: 146.7/km^{2} (379.9/sq mi)
- Postcode(s): 4521
- Area: 16.2 km^{2} (6.3 sq mi)
- Time zone: AEST (UTC+10:00)
- Location: 22.7 km (14 mi) NW of Strathpine; 46.9 km (29 mi) NNW of Brisbane CBD
- LGA(s): City of Moreton Bay
- County: County of Stanley
- State electorate(s): Pine Rivers
- Federal division(s): Dickson
Localities around Dayboro:
Mount Pleasant	King Scrub	Rush Creek
Laceys Creek	Dayboro	Rush Creek
Armstrong Creek	Armstrong Creek	Samsonvale

Dayboro is a rural town and locality in the City of Moreton Bay, Queensland, Australia. In the 2021 census, the locality of Dayboro had a population of 2,376 people.

== Geography ==
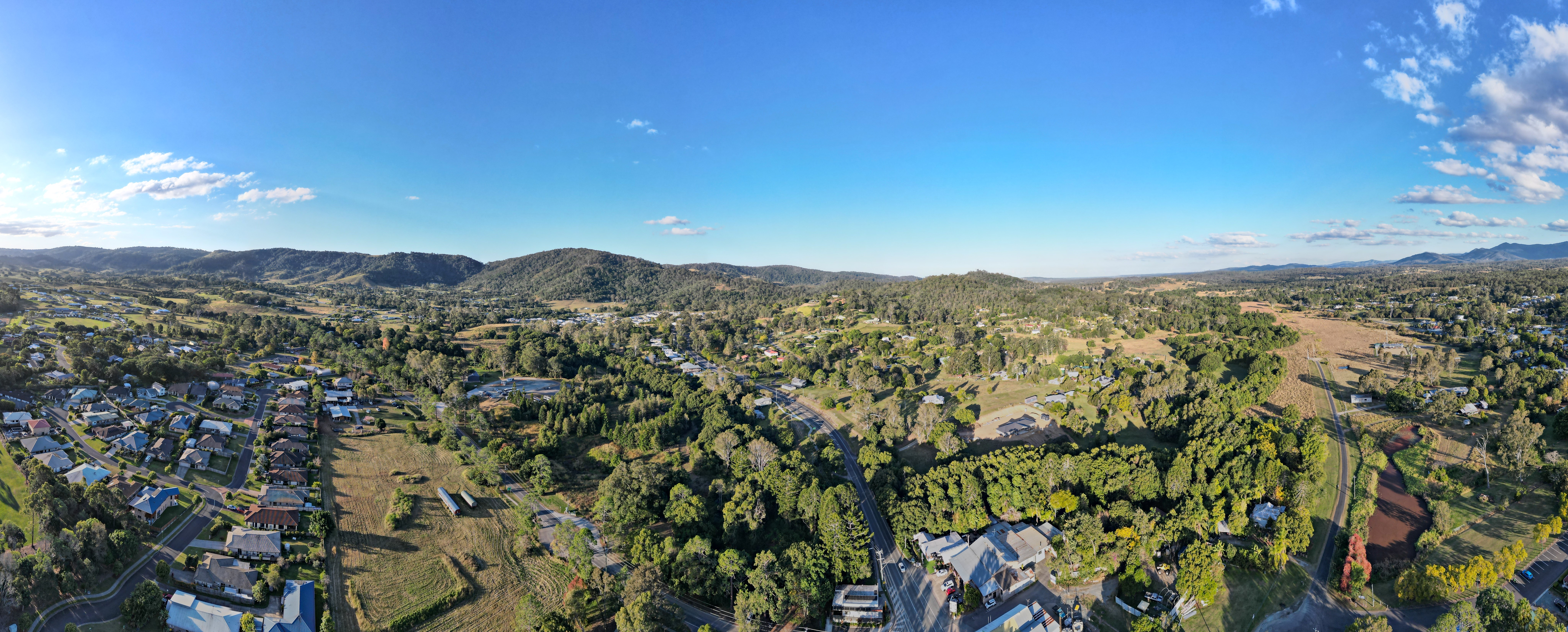
Dayboro aerial panorama. June 2023.

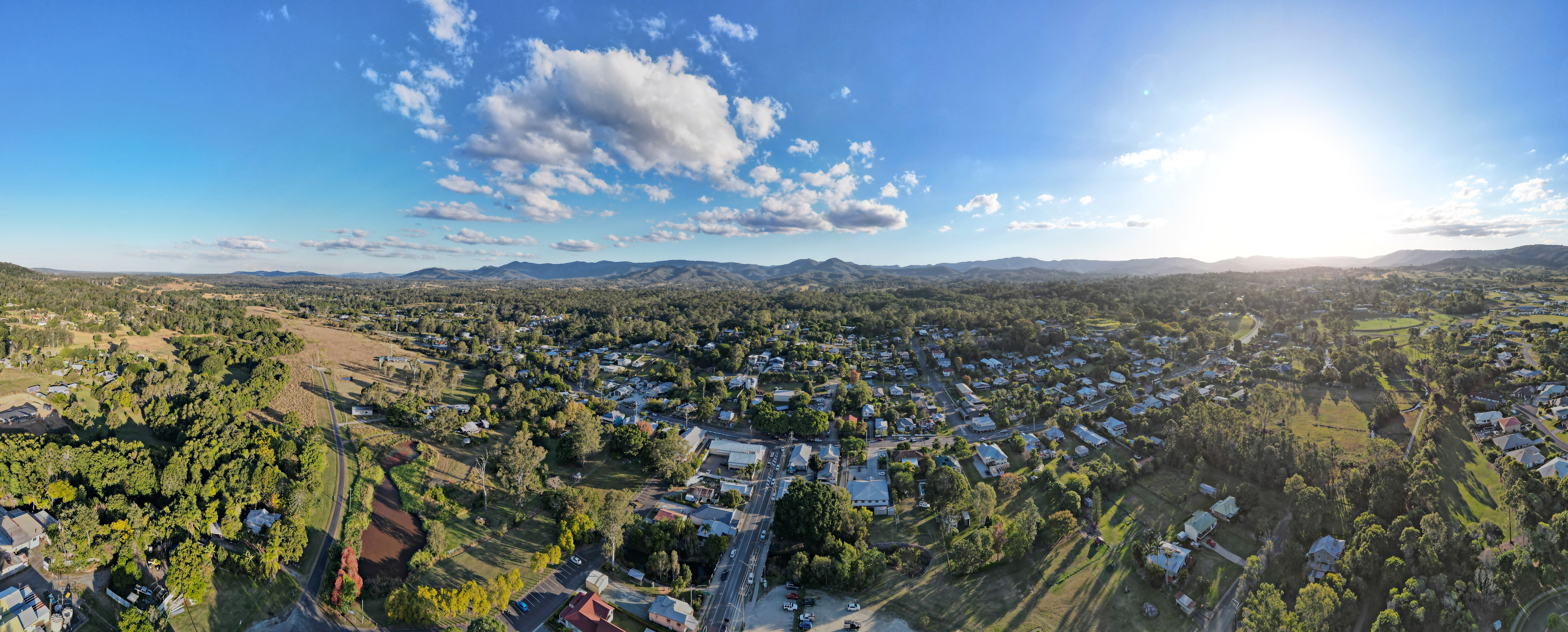
Dayboro and surrounds from above. June 2023.

Dayboro is approximately 46 kilometres (29 mi) north-northwest of Brisbane, the state capital.

To the north of Dayboro lies the D'Aguilar Range and the mountain township of Mount Mee. Other nearby towns include Petrie and Samford. The land surrounding the town supports avocado and pineapple plantations, as well as dairy cattle.

== History ==
Garumngar (also known as Dalla, Garumga. See also Wakka Wakka related languages/dialects) is a language of the Upper Brisbane River catchment. The Garumngar language region includes the landscape within the local government boundaries of the Ipswich, Brisbane, Somerset and Moreton Bay councils, particularly the towns of Dayboro and Esk extending east towards Moggill.

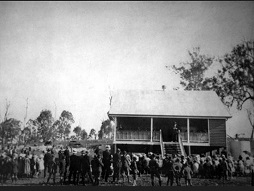
Opening day at Terror's Creek Provisional School (now Dayboro State School), 1874

Dayboro was first known as Hamilton, having been so named after a farmer, Hugh Hamilton, who was appointed Receiving Officer for mail in 1875. In 1892, it became known as Terrors Creek from the creek on which it is situated. The creek and the adjoining area, which became known as Terrors Paddock, derived their names from a grey Arab stallion, Terah, owned in the 1850s by Captain John Griffin of the Whiteside run.

Terror's Creek Provisional School opened on 18 May 1874. On 1 May 1890 it became Terror's Creek State School. It was renamed Dayboro State School in 1917.

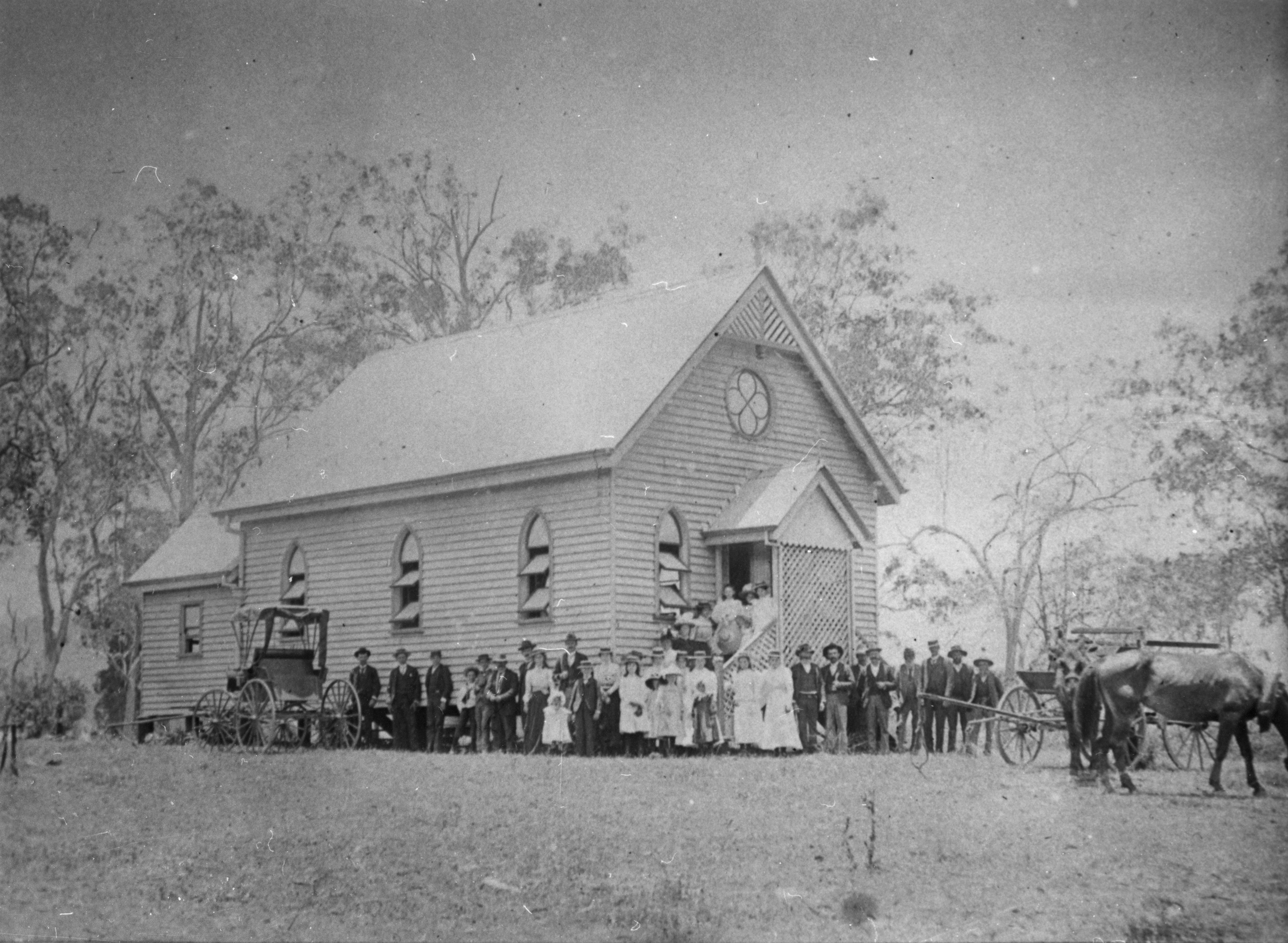
Opening of St Francis Xavier Catholic Church, 11 September 1898

St Francis Xavier's Catholic Church opened on 11 September 1898.

Settlement subsequently spread north and south along the North Pine River as more than 100 people took up selections in the Terrors Creek area. Timber, maize, vegetables and dairy products provided the main income for the settlers. The failure of Day's sugar growing experiment within a few years brought about the gradual breaking up of his large land holdings and facilitated the further development of the area. A store and hotel, the nucleus of the town, were established in the early 1890s and these were followed by a sawmill around 1900 and the Silverwood Butter Factory in 1903.

Terrors Creek Presbyterian church was built in 1900. In 1977, it participated in the amalgamation that created the Uniting Church in Australia and became Dayboro Uniting Church. On 20 November 2016, the church celebrated its 115th anniversary.

Mayfield State School opened in 1910 and closed circa 1936.

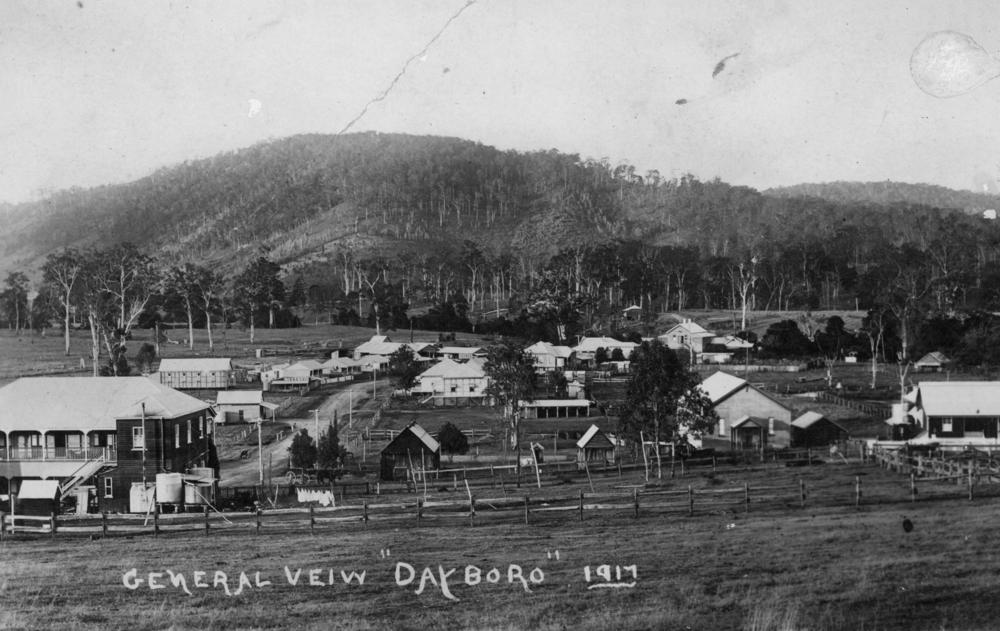
View of Dayboro in 1917

In 1915, in an article urging the extension of the railway from Enoggera to Terror's Creek, the township was described as "being set prettily on a hillside, and being the centre of miles of agricultural, dairying and fruit lands". According to the article [Australian Pastoralist, Grazing Farmers' and Selectors' Gazette, September 1915, Supplement, pp. 2–3], there was "an up-to-date butter factory, bank, several stores, an excellent hotel, a large sawmill, public hall, etc., and a community ever ready to co-operate in the advancement of their district".

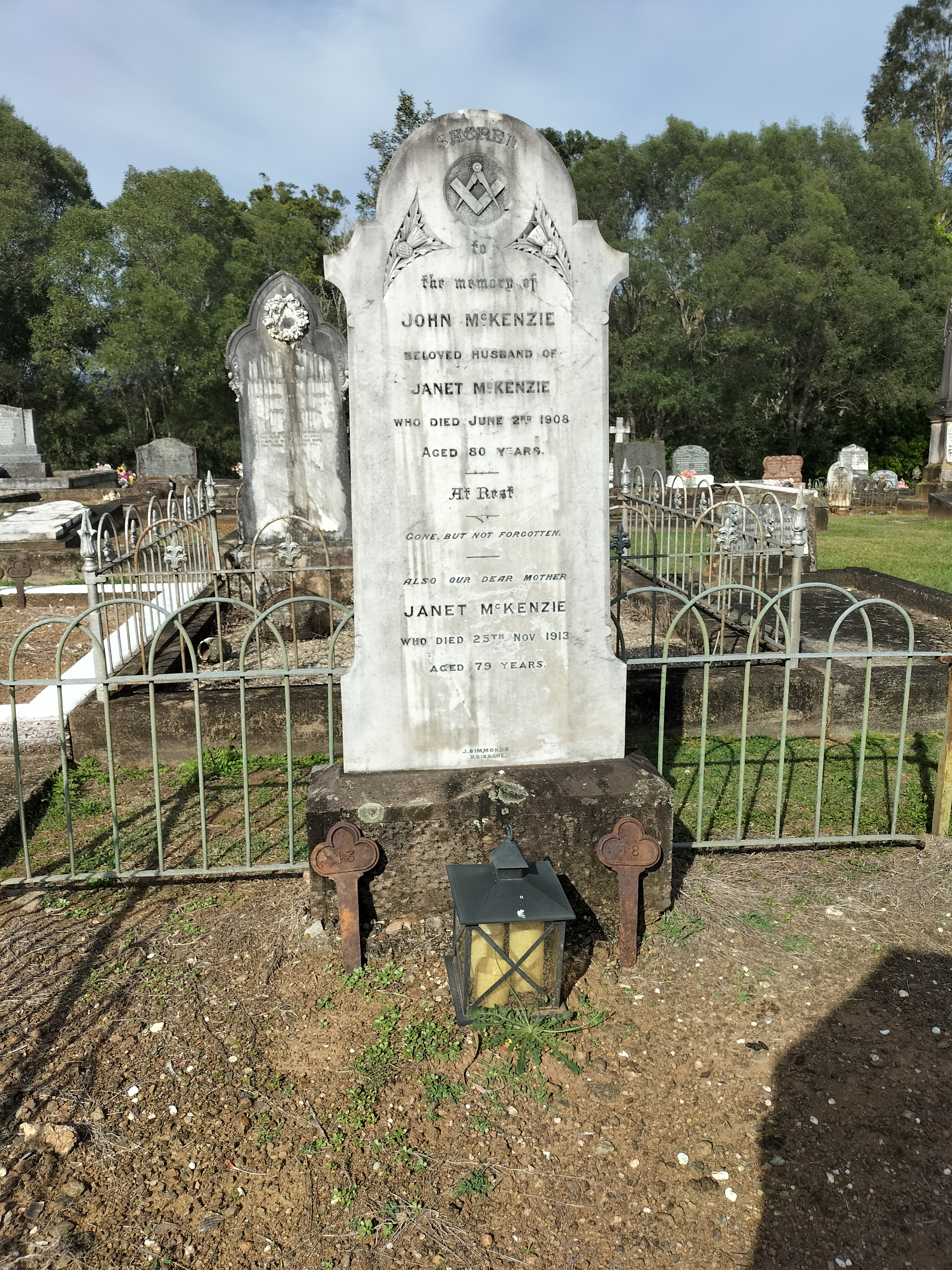
Grave of John McKenzie in Dayboro Cemetery, Queensland. 2024

In 1917, however, as the Postmaster General declared that Terrors Creek sounded too much like Torrens Creek, once again, the township acquired a new name. Although the first known inhabitant, John McKenzie, operated a pit sawmill just south of the townsite from 1866, the third and final name selected for Dayboro honours another notable early settler, William Henry Day. Day was Clerk of Petty Sessions and later Police Magistrate in Brisbane. He first selected land in the Dayboro area in the late 1860s and pioneered sugar growing on his extensive properties in the district.

On 25 September 1920, the Dayboro railway line was opened, running through Samford from Ferny Grove. There were a number of stations servicing the line, including at Kobble Creek, Samsonvale, and Samford. The line serviced Dayboro and surrounding areas for 35 years, continuing to operate until 1 July 1955 when it closed beyond Ferny Grove due to declining traffic, largely from the increased access to the area by road traffic. The remaining line is now known as the Ferny Grove railway line and operates passenger services within the City of Brisbane. Remnants of the railway line can still be found throughout Dayboro and surrounding districts, including former railway bridges over the North Pine River, and cuttings along Strong Road. Railway pits were once located between the local swimming pool and sawmill (now the Old Mill Animal Hospital).

St Aidan's Anglican Church was officially opened on Sunday 6 April 1930 by Archbishop Gerald Sharp.

== Demographics ==
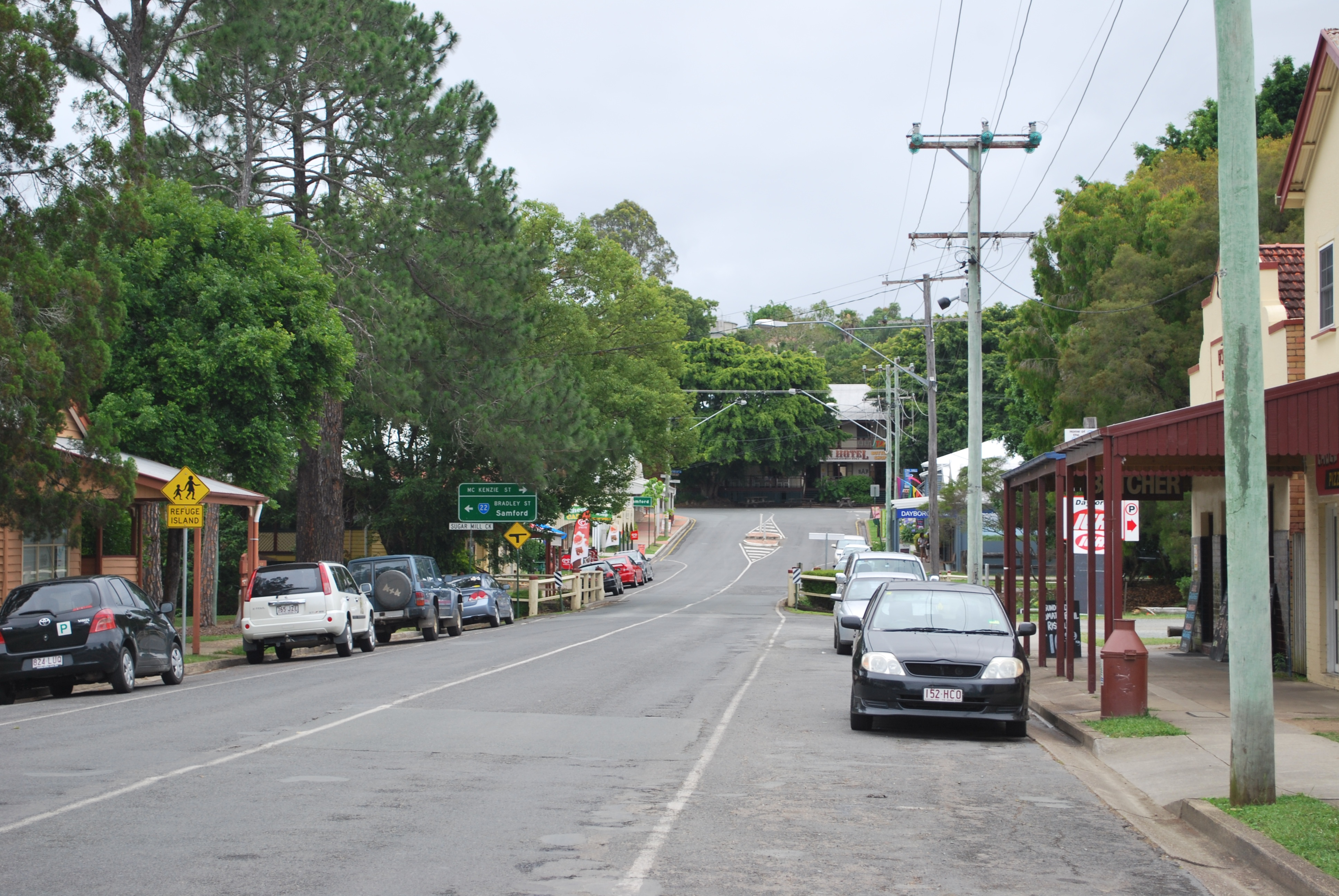
Dayboro Main Street

In the 2011 census, the locality of Dayboro had a population of 1,692 people, 51.7% female and 48.3% male. The median age of the Dayboro population was 37 years, the same as the national median. 82.4% of people living in Dayboro were born in Australia. The other top responses for country of birth were England 8.4%, New Zealand 2.1%, Scotland 0.8%, Netherlands 0.8%, Germany 0.5%. 96.2% of people spoke only English at home; the next most common languages were 1.1% Dutch, 0.4% German, 0.4% Swedish, 0.2% Yumplatok (Torres Strait Creole).

In the 2016 census, the locality of Dayboro had a population of 2,119 people.

In the 2021 census, the locality of Dayboro had a population of 2,376 people.

== Education ==
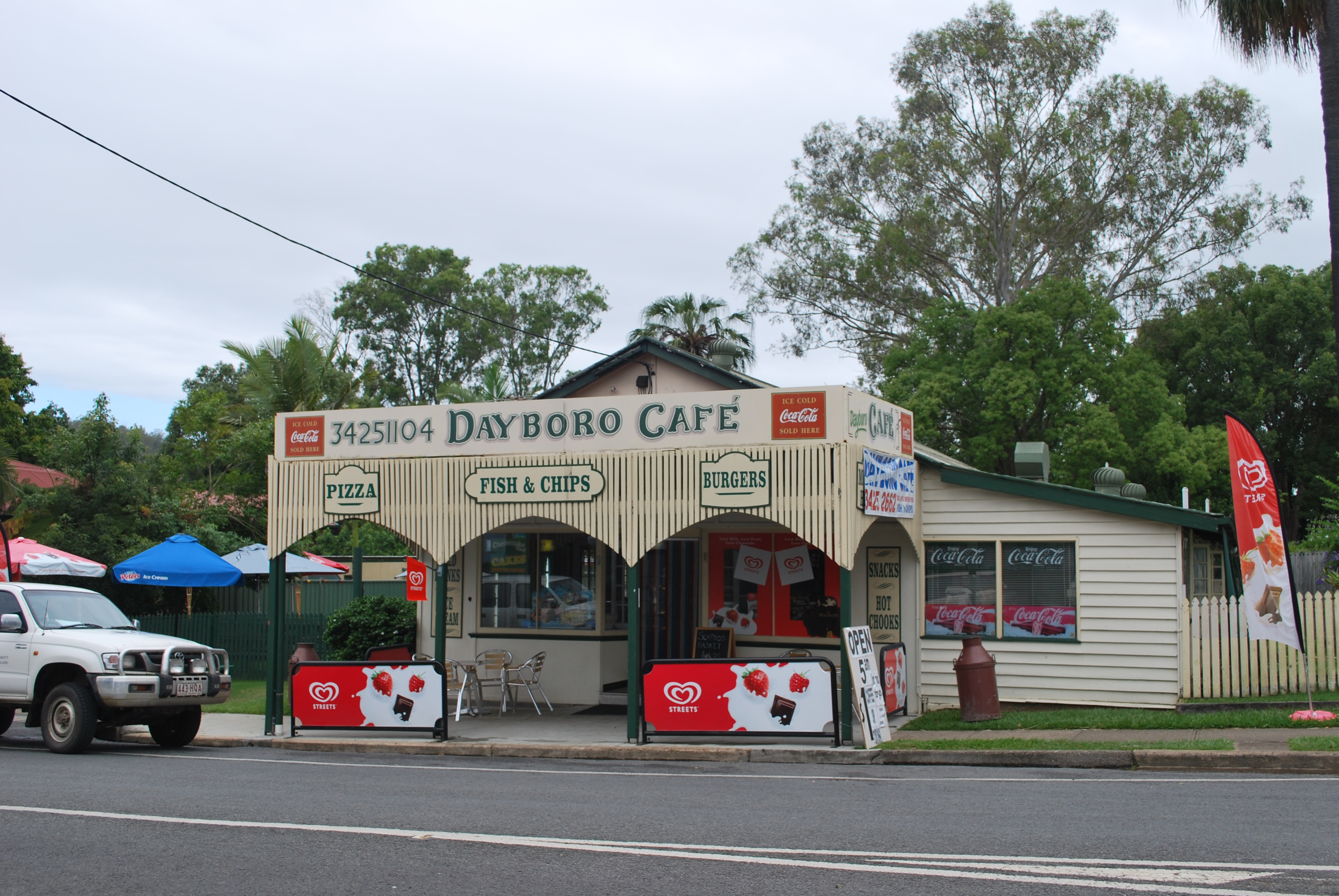
Dayboro Cafe

Dayboro State School is a government primary (Prep-6) school for boys and girls at 58 McKenzie Street (27.1941°S 152.8203°E). In 2018, the school had an enrolment of 369 students with 28 teachers (22 full-time equivalent) and 18 non-teaching staff (11 full-time equivalent). It includes a special education program.

There are no secondary schools in Dayboro. The nearest government secondary school is Bray Park State High School in Bray Park to the south-east.

== Amenities ==
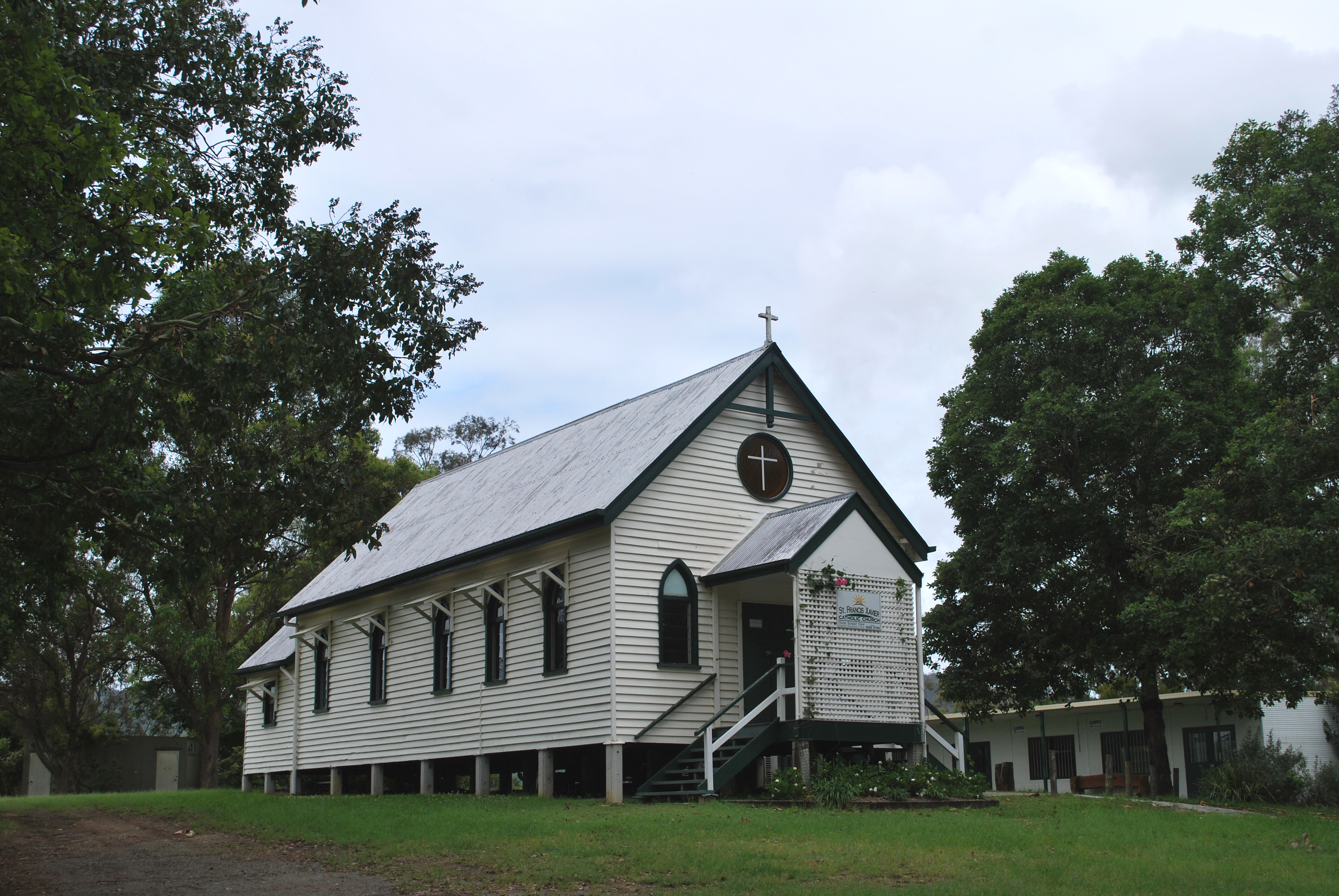
Dayboro Catholic Church

The Moreton Bay City Council operates a mobile library service which visits the Hay Cottage on William Street.

The Dayboro branch of the Queensland Country Women's Association meets at the Moreton Bay City Council Building in Williams Street.

St Francis Xavier's Catholic Church is at 135 McKenzie Street.

St Aidan's Anglican Church is at 46-48 McKenzie Street (27.1950°S 152.8212°E).

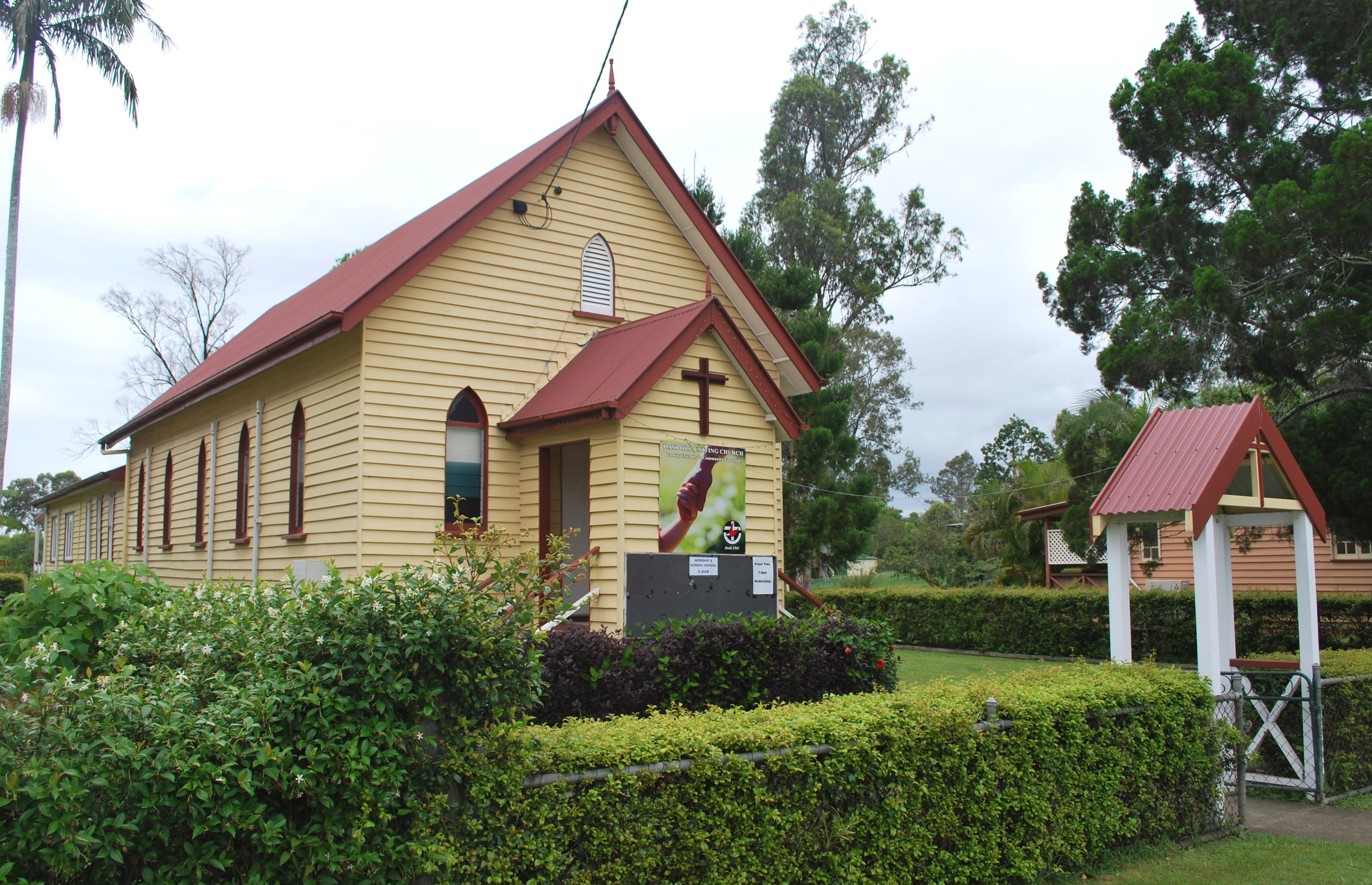
Dayboro Uniting Church, 2010

Dayboro Uniting Church is at 22 Williams Street (27.1965°S 152.8242°E). It is part of the Moreton Presbytery of the Uniting Church in Australia.

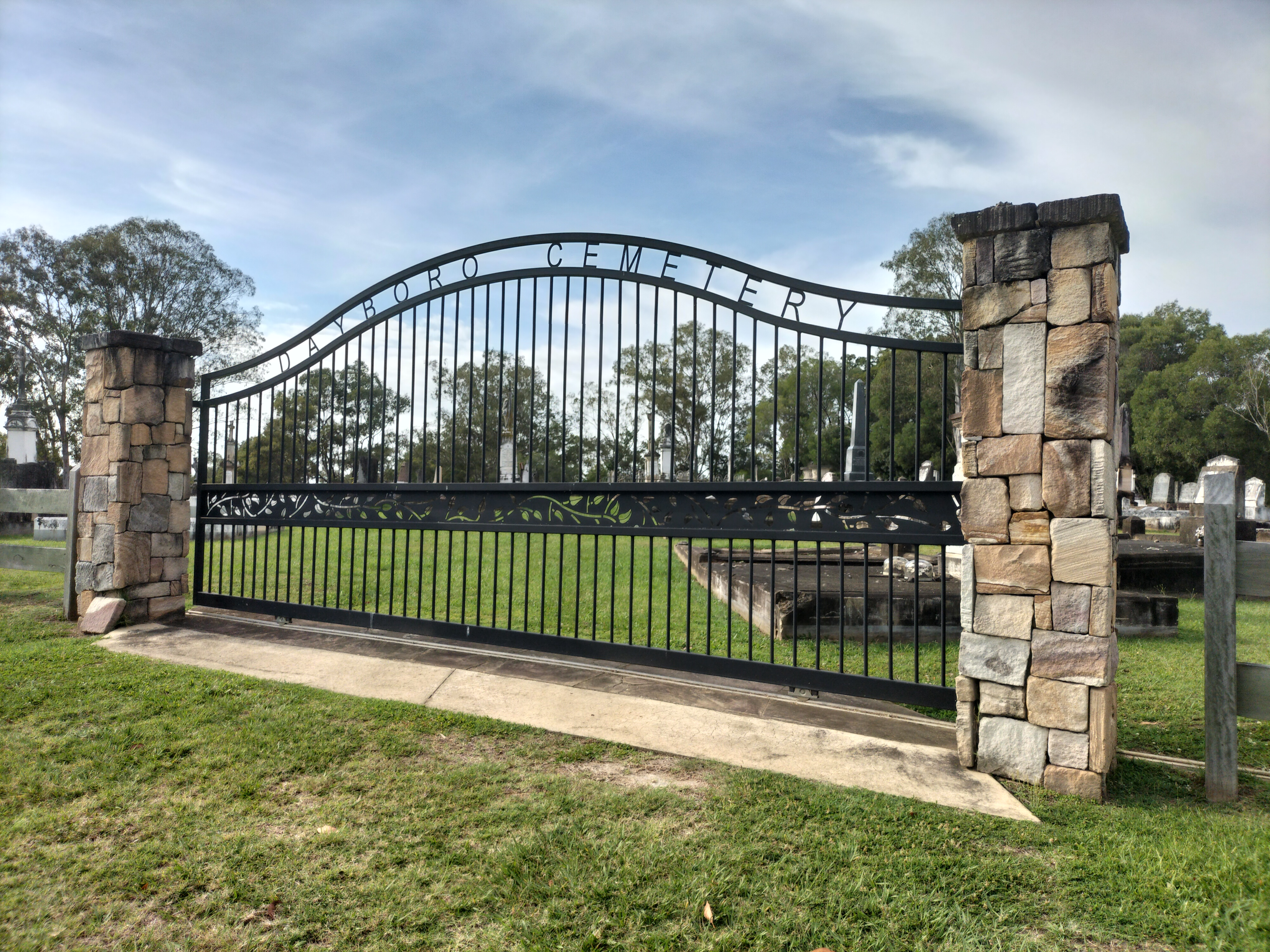
Dayboro Cemetery gate, Dayboro, Queensland. 2024

The Dayboro Cemetery is located at the junction of McKenzie Street, Riverview Court and Laceys Creek Road, Dayboro (27.1910°S 152.8127°E).

The Dayboro War Memorial Grounds at Don Kerr Memorial Drive have facilities for various associations and sporting clubs (27.1887°S 152.8263°E).

== Events ==
The Dayboro Rodeo and Dayboro Show usually occur between May and July every year, at the Showgrounds which are within the Dayboro War Memorial Grounds at 3512 Mount Mee Rd.

The Dayboro Day Festival is held every year on the last Sunday in May. It was first held in 1991, and now over 20,000 visitors attend annually, attracted by the entertainment, demonstrations and market stalls in Williams St (the main street of Dayboro), as well as the Antique & Collectables Fair at the Showgrounds. The Dayboro District Progress Association Inc organises and sponsors the event.

Dayboro Country Markets are held on the first Sunday of every month (except January).
