= Electoral results for the district of Pine Rivers =

Queensland, Australia, district election results

This is a list of electoral results for the electoral district of Pine Rivers in Queensland state elections.

== Members for Pine Rivers ==
First incarnation (1972–1992)
Member	Party	Term
Kenneth Leese	Labor	1972–1974
Rob Akers	Liberal	1974–1983
Yvonne Chapman	National	1983–1989
Margaret Woodgate	Labor	1989–1992
Second incarnation (2009–present)
Member	Party	Term
Carolyn Male	Labor	2009–2012
Seath Holswich	Liberal National	2012–2015
Nikki Boyd	Labor	2015–present

== Election results ==
=== Elections in the 2020s ===
2024 Queensland state election: Pine Rivers
Party	Candidate	Votes	%	±%
Liberal National	Dean Clements	15,082	41.25	+4.85
Labor	Nikki Boyd	14,406	39.41	−5.09
Greens	Sonja Gerdsen	3,546	9.70	+0.30
One Nation	Matthew Robinson	2,472	6.76	+1.66
Animal Justice	Maureen Brohman	1,052	2.88	+1.28
Total formal votes		36,558	97.08	
Informal votes		1,098	2.92	
Turnout		37,656	91.48	
Two-party-preferred result
Labor	Nikki Boyd	18,533	50.69	−6.01
Liberal National	Dean Clements	18,025	49.31	+6.01
Labor hold		Swing	–6.01	

2020 Queensland state election: Pine Rivers
Party	Candidate	Votes	%	±%
Labor	Nikki Boyd	14,953	44.48	+7.54
Liberal National	Kara Thomas	12,263	36.48	+9.62
Greens	Tara Seiffert-Smith	3,148	9.36	+0.59
One Nation	Christopher Leech	1,702	5.06	−7.11
Animal Justice	Maureen Brohman	549	1.63	+1.63
Informed Medical Options	Alissa Pattrick	427	1.27	+1.27
Independent	Bruce Vaschina	326	0.97	+0.97
United Australia	Steve Austin	250	0.74	+0.74
Total formal votes		33,618	96.79	+0.68
Informal votes		1,115	3.21	−0.68
Turnout		34,733	91.54	+0.26
Two-party-preferred result
Labor	Nikki Boyd	19,063	56.70	+0.52
Liberal National	Kara Thomas	14,555	43.30	−0.52
Labor hold		Swing	+0.52	

=== Elections in the 2010s ===
2017 Queensland state election: Pine Rivers
Party	Candidate	Votes	%	±%
Labor	Nikki Boyd	12,002	36.9	−6.6
Liberal National	Chris Thompson	8,727	26.9	−15.1
One Nation	Peter Warren	3,956	12.2	+12.2
Greens	Jack Margaritis	2,849	8.8	−1.1
Independent	Seath Holswich	2,545	7.8	+7.8
Independent	Michael Kosenko	2,055	6.3	+6.3
Consumer Rights	Greg French	355	1.1	+1.1
Total formal votes		32,489	96.1	−1.8
Informal votes		1,314	3.9	+1.8
Turnout		33,803	91.3	+1.6
Two-party-preferred result
Labor	Nikki Boyd	18,255	56.2	+2.1
Liberal National	Chris Thompson	14,234	43.8	−2.1
Labor hold		Swing	+2.1	

2015 Queensland state election: Pine Rivers
Party	Candidate	Votes	%	±%
Labor	Nikki Boyd	14,752	48.47	+21.06
Liberal National	Seath Holswich	11,820	38.84	−14.10
Greens	John Marshall	2,444	8.03	−0.41
Independent	Thor Prohaska	1,419	4.66	+4.66
Total formal votes		30,435	97.91	+0.52
Informal votes		651	2.09	−0.52
Turnout		31,086	92.34	−0.84
Two-party-preferred result
Labor	Nikki Boyd	16,953	57.68	+21.34
Liberal National	Seath Holswich	12,440	42.32	−21.34
Labor gain from Liberal National		Swing	+21.34	

2012 Queensland state election: Pine Rivers
Party	Candidate	Votes	%	±%
Liberal National	Seath Holswich	14,590	52.93	+13.41
Labor	Patrick Bulman	7,556	27.41	−19.95
Katter's Australian	John Alexander	3,091	11.21	+11.21
Greens	Di Clark	2,326	8.44	−0.21
Total formal votes		27,563	97.38	−0.48
Informal votes		741	2.62	+0.48
Turnout		28,304	93.18	+0.29
Two-party-preferred result
Liberal National	Seath Holswich	15,856	63.66	+18.27
Labor	Patrick Bulman	9,052	36.34	−18.27
Liberal National gain from Labor		Swing	+18.27	

=== Elections in the 2000s ===
2009 Queensland state election: Pine Rivers
Party	Candidate	Votes	%	±%
Labor	Carolyn Male	12,321	47.4	−10.1
Liberal National	Luke Mellers	10,280	39.5	+6.2
Greens	Tony Cole	2,249	8.6	−0.3
Family First	Tim Wallace	1,163	4.5	+4.5
Total formal votes		26,013	90.75	
Informal votes		570	2.14	
Turnout		26,583	92.89	
Two-party-preferred result
Labor	Carolyn Male	13,433	54.6	−8.7
Liberal National	Luke Mellers	11,163	45.4	+8.7
Labor hold		Swing	−8.7	

=== Elections in the 1980s ===
1989 Queensland state election: Pine Rivers
Party	Candidate	Votes	%	±%
Labor	Margaret Woodgate	11,286	53.4	+16.2
National	Yvonne Chapman	3,861	18.3	−15.9
Liberal	Rob Akers	2,758	13.1	−13.3
Liberal	Graham Harris	2,626	12.4	+12.4
Independent	Trevor Campbell	376	1.8	+1.8
Independent	John Kennedy	233	1.1	+1.1
Total formal votes		21,140	97.2	−0.9
Informal votes		598	2.8	+0.9
Turnout		21,738	94.7	+1.0
Two-party-preferred result
Labor	Margaret Woodgate	11,754	55.6	+9.1
Liberal	Rob Akers	9,386	44.4	+44.4
Labor gain from National		Swing	+9.1	

1986 Queensland state election: Pine Rivers
Party	Candidate	Votes	%	±%
Labor	Daniel O'Connell	6,579	37.2	−7.2
National	Yvonne Chapman	6,059	34.2	+3.7
Liberal	Robert Akers	4,664	26.4	+1.3
Democrats	Isobel Robinson	400	2.3	+2.3
Total formal votes		17,702	98.1	−0.7
Informal votes		339	1.9	+0.7
Turnout		18,041	93.7	−0.4
Two-party-preferred result
National	Yvonne Chapman	9,479	53.6	−1.1
Labor	Daniel O'Connell	8,223	46.4	+1.1
National hold		Swing	−1.1	

1983 Queensland state election: Pine Rivers
Party	Candidate	Votes	%	±%
Labor	John Kennedy	9,842	44.4	+1.9
National	Yvonne Chapman	6,773	30.5	+30.5
Liberal	Rob Akers	5,566	25.1	−32.4
Total formal votes		22,181	98.8	+0.8
Informal votes		263	1.2	−0.8
Turnout		22,444	94.1	+2.6
Two-party-preferred result
National	Yvonne Chapman	11,173	50.4	+50.4
Labor	John Kennedy	11,008	49.6	+7.1
National gain from Liberal		Swing	N/A	

1980 Queensland state election: Pine Rivers
Party	Candidate	Votes	%	±%
Liberal	Rob Akers	10,476	57.5	+7.5
Labor	June Willmot	7,747	42.5	−2.5
Total formal votes		18,223	98.0	−0.9
Informal votes		367	2.0	+0.9
Turnout		18,590	91.5	−1.7
Liberal hold		Swing	+4.1	

=== Elections in the 1970s ===
1977 Queensland state election: Pine Rivers
Party	Candidate	Votes	%	±%
Liberal	Rob Akers	7,328	50.0	+10.3
Labor	Kenneth Leese	6,595	45.0	+8.2
Progress	Rodney Jeanneret	741	5.0	+5.0
Total formal votes		14,664	98.9	
Informal votes		156	1.1	
Turnout		14,820	93.2	
Two-party-preferred result
Liberal	Rob Akers	7,837	53.4	−8.5
Labor	Kenneth Leese	6,827	46.6	+8.5
Liberal hold		Swing	−8.5	

1974 Queensland state election: Pine Rivers
Party	Candidate	Votes	%	±%
Liberal	Rob Akers	8,761	39.7	+21.8
Labor	Kenneth Leese	8,132	36.8	−16.5
National	Donald Hawkins	5,185	23.5	+0.3
Total formal votes		22,078	98.7	+0.3
Informal votes		294	1.3	−0.3
Turnout		22,372	91.2	−2.7
Two-party-preferred result
Liberal	Rob Akers	13,667	61.9	+18.7
Labor	Kenneth Leese	8,411	38.1	−18.7
Liberal gain from Labor		Swing	+18.7	

1972 Queensland state election: Pine Rivers
Party	Candidate	Votes	%	±%
Labor	Kenneth Leese	8,259	53.3	
Country	Allan Male	3,587	23.2	
Liberal	William Battershill	2,771	17.9	
Queensland Labor	Brian Flynn	872	5.6	
Total formal votes		15,489	98.4	
Informal votes		252	1.6	
Turnout		15,741	93.9	
Two-party-preferred result
Labor	Kenneth Leese	8,794	56.8	+4.4
Country	Allan Male	6,695	43.2	−4.4
Labor hold		Swing	+4.4	
