= Electoral results for the district of Kurwongbah =

Queensland, Australia, district election results

This is a list of electoral results for the electoral district of Kurwongbah in Queensland state elections.

== Members for Kurwongbah ==
First incarnation (1992–2009)
Member	Party	Term
Margaret Woodgate	Labor	1992–1997
Linda Lavarch	Labor	1997–2009
Second incarnation (2017–present)
Member	Party	Term
Shane King	Labor	2017–present

== Election results ==
=== Elections in the 2020s ===
2024 Queensland state election: Kurwongbah
Party	Candidate	Votes	%	±%
Labor	Shane King	15,596	43.36	−8.43
Liberal National	Tanya McKewen	12,123	33.70	+6.72
Greens	Jordan Martin	3,006	8.36	+0.97
One Nation	Christopher Leech	2,789	7.75	−1.29
Family First	William Ross Pitt	1,575	4.38	+4.38
Animal Justice	Gregory Dillon	883	2.45	−0.06
Total formal votes		35,972	96.39	+0.05
Informal votes		1,347	3.61	−0.05
Turnout		37,319	89.31	+0.59
Two-party-preferred result
Labor	Shane King	20,103	55.89	−7.26
Liberal National	Tanya McKewen	15,869	44.11	+7.26
Labor hold		Swing	−7.26	

2020 Queensland state election: Kurwongbah
Party	Candidate	Votes	%	±%
Labor	Shane King	16,243	51.79	+10.40
Liberal National	Kerry Petrus	8,460	26.98	+2.50
One Nation	Kim Attrill	2,834	9.04	−12.76
Greens	Earl Snijders	2,317	7.39	−1.12
Animal Justice	Heather Dwane	787	2.51	+2.51
Independent	Thor Prohaska	721	2.30	−1.53
Total formal votes		31,362	96.34	+0.77
Informal votes		1,192	3.66	−0.77
Turnout		32,554	88.72	−0.36
Two-party-preferred result
Labor	Shane King	19,804	63.15	+6.15
Liberal National	Kerry Petrus	11,558	36.85	−6.15
Labor hold		Swing	+6.15	

=== Elections in the 2010s ===
2017 Queensland state election: Kurwongbah
Party	Candidate	Votes	%	±%
Labor	Shane King	12,255	41.4	−6.0
Liberal National	Allan Cook	7,247	24.5	−14.4
One Nation	Karen Haddock	6,452	21.8	+21.8
Greens	Rachel Doherty	2,519	8.5	+0.6
Independent	Thor Prohaska	1,134	3.8	+3.8
Total formal votes		29,607	95.6	−2.1
Informal votes		1,374	4.4	+2.1
Turnout		30,981	89.1	−0.1
Two-party-preferred result
Labor	Shane King	16,874	57.0	−0.1
Liberal National	Allan Cook	12,733	43.0	+0.1
Labor hold		Swing	−0.1	

=== Elections in the 2000s ===
2006 Queensland state election: Kurwongbah
Party	Candidate	Votes	%	±%
Labor	Linda Lavarch	17,699	56.48	+1.93
National	Terry Orreal	10,686	34.10	+2.60
Greens	Terry Jones	2,949	9.41	+1.83
Total formal votes		31,334	98.03	−0.13
Informal votes		630	1.97	+0.13
Turnout		31,964	92.99	−0.62
Two-party-preferred result
Labor	Linda Lavarch	18,791	62.36	−0.09
National	Terry Orreal	11,341	37.64	+0.09
Labor hold		Swing	−0.09	

2004 Queensland state election: Kurwongbah
Party	Candidate	Votes	%	±%
Labor	Linda Lavarch	16,148	54.55	−8.40
National	Terry Orreal	9,323	31.50	+31.50
Greens	Daniel Boon	2,245	7.58	+1.01
One Nation	Dean Westbury	1,184	4.00	+4.00
Independent	Connie Wood	701	2.37	+2.37
Total formal votes		29,601	98.16	+0.57
Informal votes		554	1.84	−0.57
Turnout		30,155	93.61	−0.72
Two-party-preferred result
Labor	Linda Lavarch	17,128	62.45	−10.25
National	Terry Orreal	10,299	37.55	+37.55
Labor hold		Swing	−10.25	

2001 Queensland state election: Kurwongbah
Party	Candidate	Votes	%	±%
Labor	Linda Lavarch	16,889	62.9	+13.6
Liberal	Brenda Martin	5,757	21.5	−1.2
Greens	Kim Pantano	1,762	6.6	+0.9
Democrats	Matt Harrison	1,460	5.4	+5.4
City Country Alliance	Steve Purtill	963	3.6	+3.6
Total formal votes		26,831	97.6	
Informal votes		663	2.4	
Turnout		27,494	94.3	
Two-party-preferred result
Labor	Linda Lavarch	17,987	72.7	+9.7
Liberal	Brenda Martin	6,755	27.3	−9.7
Labor hold		Swing	+9.7	

=== Elections in the 1990s ===
1998 Queensland state election: Kurwongbah
Party	Candidate	Votes	%	±%
Labor	Linda Lavarch	11,857	49.5	+4.5
Liberal	Justin Kerr	5,423	22.6	−9.8
One Nation	Kim Thistlethwaite	5,312	22.2	+22.2
Greens	Kim Pantano	1,371	5.7	−3.5
Total formal votes		23,963	98.5	−0.1
Informal votes		356	1.5	+0.1
Turnout		24,319	94.8	+1.8
Two-party-preferred result
Labor	Linda Lavarch	13,847	63.2	+7.3
Liberal	Justin Kerr	8,061	36.8	−7.3
Labor hold		Swing	+7.3	

1997 Kurwongbah state by-election
Party	Candidate	Votes	%	±%
Labor	Linda Lavarch	10,148	48.19	+3.20
Liberal	Peter Rankin	5,238	24.88	−7.48
Independent	Yvonne Moran	3,173	15.07	+15.07
Greens	Kim Pantano	1,359	6.45	−2.76
Independent	Rona Joyner	521	2.47	+2.47
Shooters	Bev Salisbury	452	2.15	+2.15
Independent	Peter Byrne	167	0.79	+0.79
Total formal votes		21,056	98.14	−0.42
Informal votes		400	1.86	+0.42
Turnout		21,456	84.37	
Two-party-preferred result
Labor	Linda Lavarch	11,484	60.20	+4.30
Liberal	Peter Rankin	7,580	39.80	−4.30
Labor hold		Swing	+4.30	

1995 Queensland state election: Kurwongbah
Party	Candidate	Votes	%	±%
Labor	Margaret Woodgate	9,810	45.0	−12.2
Liberal	Dennis Sharkey	7,055	32.4	+12.6
Independent	Rob Akers	2,129	9.8	+9.8
Greens	Kim Pantano	2,009	9.2	+9.2
Confederate Action	Paul Hunter	800	3.7	+3.7
Total formal votes		21,803	98.6	+0.7
Informal votes		319	1.4	−0.7
Turnout		22,122	93.0	−0.8
Two-party-preferred result
Labor	Margaret Woodgate	11,326	55.9	−7.2
Liberal	Dennis Sharkey	8,936	44.1	+7.2
Labor hold		Swing	7.2	

1992 Queensland state election: Kurwongbah
Party	Candidate	Votes	%	±%
Labor	Margaret Woodgate	11,750	57.2	+0.1
Liberal	Graeme Ashworth	4,075	19.8	−2.9
National	Bruce Stewart	3,092	15.0	−1.9
Independent	Dennis Sharkey	1,634	8.0	+8.0
Total formal votes		20,551	97.9	
Informal votes		433	2.1	
Turnout		20,984	93.8	
Two-party-preferred result
Labor	Margaret Woodgate	12,488	63.1	+3.8
Liberal	Graeme Ashworth	7,315	36.9	−3.8
Labor hold		Swing	+3.8	
