= Attorney General Lavarch =

Attorney General Lavarch may refer to:

- Linda Lavarch (born 1958), Attorney-General of Queensland
- Michael Lavarch (born 1961), Attorney-General of Australia
