= Pine Hills FC =

- Full name: Pine Hills Football Club
- Nicknames: Pythons, Pine, Hills
- Founded: 1984; 42 years ago
- Ground: James Drysdale Reserve, Bunya
- Capacity: 500
- President: John Easley
- Coach: Leo Sirriani
- League: Queensland Premier League 2
- 2026: 4th of 12
- Website: http://www.pinehillsfootball.com/
| Home colours | Away colours |

Pine Hills FC is an Australian soccer club based in Bunya, Queensland. Founded in 1984, the club currently competes in Brisbane's Football Queensland Premier League 3 − Metro.

== History ==
Pine Hills Football Club was formed as an informal break-away group from the Westside Football Club in the late 1970s, and was initially based at Pine Hills Park in Francis Road, Arana Hills. Success in attracting players to the club required it to seek ways to expand, and they were able to lease their current fields adjacent to the Jinker Track, Bunya in 1983. Senior Men's football commenced in the 1984 season after a soccer pitch at their new venue was created and made fit for competition thanks to the efforts of club volunteers. In this initial season, many of the club's senior player had transferred across from the Samford and Newmarket clubs.

Pine Hills FC started in Division 4 in their first season in 1984, finishing fourth and qualifying for the finals series. From 1986 to 1999, Pine Hills completed 14 seasons in the fourth tier of Brisbane Competition, without being promoted or relegated. However, they did win their first senior trophy during this period with a 2–0 Grand Final win against Ipswich City in 1998.

By 2004, the club had fallen to the fifth tier and was competing in the Metro 2 division. Pine Hills then had their most successful period, achieving four promotions between 2004 and 2009 to reach the Brisbane Premier League for the first time. During their ascent through the divisions, Pine Hills won three premierships (2005, 2008 and 2009) and two consecutive grand finals (2007 and 2008). Pine Hills FC completed two seasons in the BPL, finishing 7th in 2010 and last in 2011 when the club was relegated to Premier Division 1. The club was relegated again in 2014 and fell to Capital League 2. In 2020 and 2021 under new head coach Leo Sirianni, the club achieved consecutive promotions, now in FQPL 3 for the 2022 football season.

In cup competition, Pine Hills FC's best performance occurred in 2009 when they reached the semi-finals of the Brisbane Premier Cup. The club was unlucky not to reach the final having been being knocked out in a 5–3 penalty shoot-out loss to Wolves FC after the score was locked at 1–1 after extra time.

== Recent seasons ==
| Season | League | | | | | | | | | | | FFA/Australia Cup |
| Season | Division (tier) | Pld | W | D | L | GF | GA | GD | Pts | Position | Finals Series | FFA/Australia Cup |
|---|---|---|---|---|---|---|---|---|---|---|---|---|
| 2004 | Metro League 2 (6) | 18 | 9 | 4 | 5 | 46 | 38 | 8 | 31 | 4th ↑ | Runners-up | Not yet founded |
| 2005 | Metro League 1 (5) | 22 | 17 | 2 | 3 | 58 | 21 | 37 | 53 | 1st ↑ | Semi-Finalist | Not yet founded |
| 2006 | Premier Division 2 (4) | 22 | 12 | 4 | 6 | 45 | 24 | 21 | 40 | 3rd | Runners-up | Not yet founded |
| 2007 | Premier Division 2 (4) | 22 | 15 | 2 | 5 | 64 | 31 | 33 | 47 | 2nd | Champions | Not yet founded |
| 2008 | Premier Division 2 (5) | 22 | 16 | 0 | 6 | 64 | 26 | 38 | 48 | 1st ↑ | Champions | Not yet founded |
| 2009 | Premier Division 1 (4) | 22 | 15 | 5 | 2 | 51 | 24 | 27 | 50 | 1st ↑ | Semi-Finalist | Not yet founded |
| 2010 | Brisbane Premier League (3) | 26 | 11 | 2 | 13 | 41 | 56 | -15 | 35 | 7th | DNQ | Not yet founded |
| 2011 | Brisbane Premier League (3) | 26 | 0 | 3 | 23 | 22 | 93 | -71 | 3 | 14th ↓ | DNQ | Not yet founded |
| 2012 | Premier Division 1 (4) | 26 | 10 | 4 | 12 | 55 | 63 | -8 | 34 | 9th | DNQ | Not yet founded |
| 2013 | Capital League 1 (4) | 22 | 8 | 3 | 11 | 40 | 33 | 7 | 27 | 8th | DNQ | Not yet founded |
| 2014 | Capital League 1 (4) | 22 | 4 | 7 | 11 | 39 | 52 | -13 | 19 | 11th ↓ | DNQ | Preliminary Round 2 |
| 2015 | Capital League 2 (5) | 22 | 8 | 2 | 12 | 40 | 59 | -19 | 26 | 9th | DNQ | Preliminary Round 4 |
| 2016 | Capital League 2 (5) | 22 | 6 | 4 | 12 | 40 | 52 | -12 | 22 | 8th | DNQ | Preliminary Round 4 |
| 2017 | Capital League 2 (5) | 22 | 7 | 1 | 14 | 35 | 54 | -19 | 22 | 9th | DNQ | Preliminary Round 3 |

| Key: | Premiers / Champions | Promoted ↑ | Relegated ↓ |

The tier is the level in the Australian soccer league system. Tiers were adjusted when the Qld State League commenced in 2008.

== Honours ==
- Brisbane Division 2 – Champions 1998
- Brisbane Metro 1 – Premiers 2005
- Brisbane Premier Division 2 – Champions 2007
- Brisbane Premier Division 2 – Premiers and Champions 2008
- Brisbane Premier Division 1 – Premiers 2009
- Brisbane Capital League 2 - Premiers 2020
- Brisbane Capital League 1 - Premiers 2021
