= Shire of Pine Rivers =

Local government area in Queensland

- Local government area
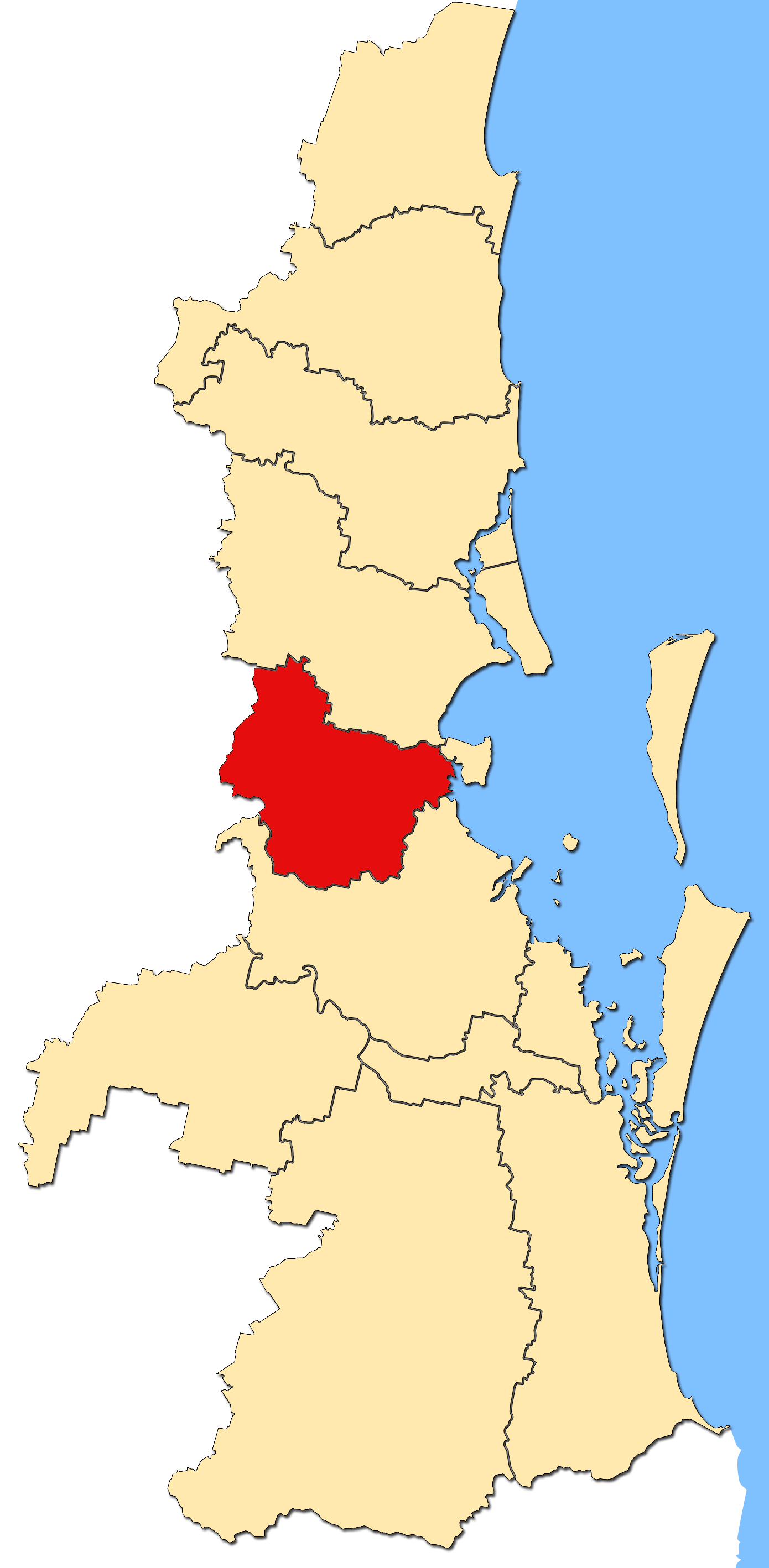
- Map of Pine Rivers Shire in South East Queensland.

- Country: Australia
- State: Queensland
- Region: South East Queensland
- Established: 1888
- Council seat: Strathpine

Government
  - Federal division: (as at 2008) Petrie, Dickson

Area
  - Total: 774.5 km^{2} (299.0 sq mi)

Population
  - Total: 141,141 (2006 census)
  - Density: 182.235/km^{2} (471.99/sq mi)
LGAs around Shire of Pine Rivers
Esk	Caboolture	Moreton Bay
Esk	Shire of Pine Rivers	Redcliffe
Brisbane	Brisbane	Brisbane

The Shire of Pine Rivers was a local government area about 20 kilometres (12 mi) north of Brisbane in the Moreton Bay region of South East Queensland, Australia. The shire covered an area of 771 square kilometres (297.7 sq mi), and existed as a local government entity from 1888 until 2008, when it amalgamated with councils further north and east to form the Moreton Bay Region, renamed in July 2023 as the City of Moreton Bay.

The suburbs formerly within Pine Rivers are generally regarded as part of Greater Brisbane, both in a planning context and for statistical purposes.

== Geography ==
The Shire was named for three rivers contained within it: the Pine River, which empties into Bramble Bay, and its tributaries, the North Pine River and South Pine River. Two large artificial reservoirs, Lake Samsonvale and Lake Kurwongbah, formed its centre. The western half of the shire consisted of the sparsely populated foothills of the D'Aguilar Range, the land being mostly forested or used for grazing cattle and horses. Hays Inlet and Saltwater Creek formed the eastern boundary of the Shire, beyond which lay the City of Redcliffe.

The main population concentration was in the east and southeast of the shire—the western part, which covered 76% of the shire's land area, contained only 18,309 residents in 2006. The key centres of population were Strathpine, which formed a mini-CBD for the area; Petrie and Kallangur further to the north, and Albany Creek and the Hills District closer to Brisbane's boundary. A new area based around North Lakes in the shire's north-east had also become reasonably established.

== History ==
=== Area history ===
The area was settled by homestead farmers in the mid 19th century. Many suburbs – Lawnton, Petrie, Griffin and Joyner, for example – are named after early European settlers. The first township in the area was established at what is now Petrie in 1868, to service mail coaches between Brisbane and Gympie. The Caboolture railway line reached the shire in 1888. Another railway line to Dayboro, in the western, mountainous areas of the shire was opened in 1920, but due to lack of traffic was closed and lifted in 1955.

During the Second World War, large areas of flat land around Brendale and Strathpine were used by Allied forces as airfields and staging areas. It is estimated that around 50,000 Allied servicemen passed through the area, at a time when the civilian population was less than 5000.

=== Local government history ===
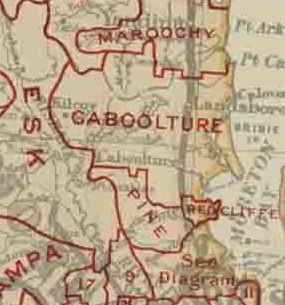
Map of Pine Division and adjacent local government areas, March 1902

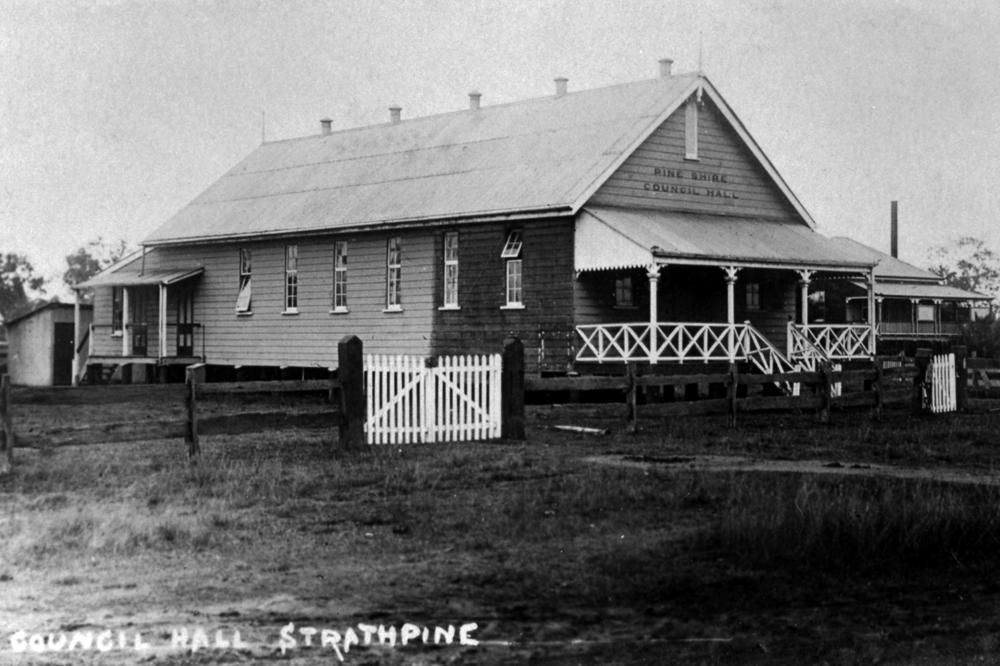
Pine Shire Hall, Strathpine, circa 1920

Caboolture Division was created on 11 November 1879 as one of 74 divisions around Queensland under the Divisional Boards Act 1879. It was centred on Caboolture, which was at that time a small logging town, and initially covered all of Moreton Bay and much of the Sunshine Coast. On 21 January 1888, the Pine Division split away from the Caboolture Division to become a separate local government area operating under the Divisional Boards Act 1887. Its first divisional board meeting was held on 7 March 1888 at the residence of Henry Thomas Ireland at Albany Creek Mr Ireland was unanimously elected as the board chairman for the year.

The meetings of the divisional board were held in rented premises at Bald Hill until a meeting hall and office building (now the heritage-listed "Old Shire Hall") was constructed in Strathpine in 1889.

In 1897, parts of the Parishes of Samsonvale, Pine and Whiteside were included in the Pine Division.

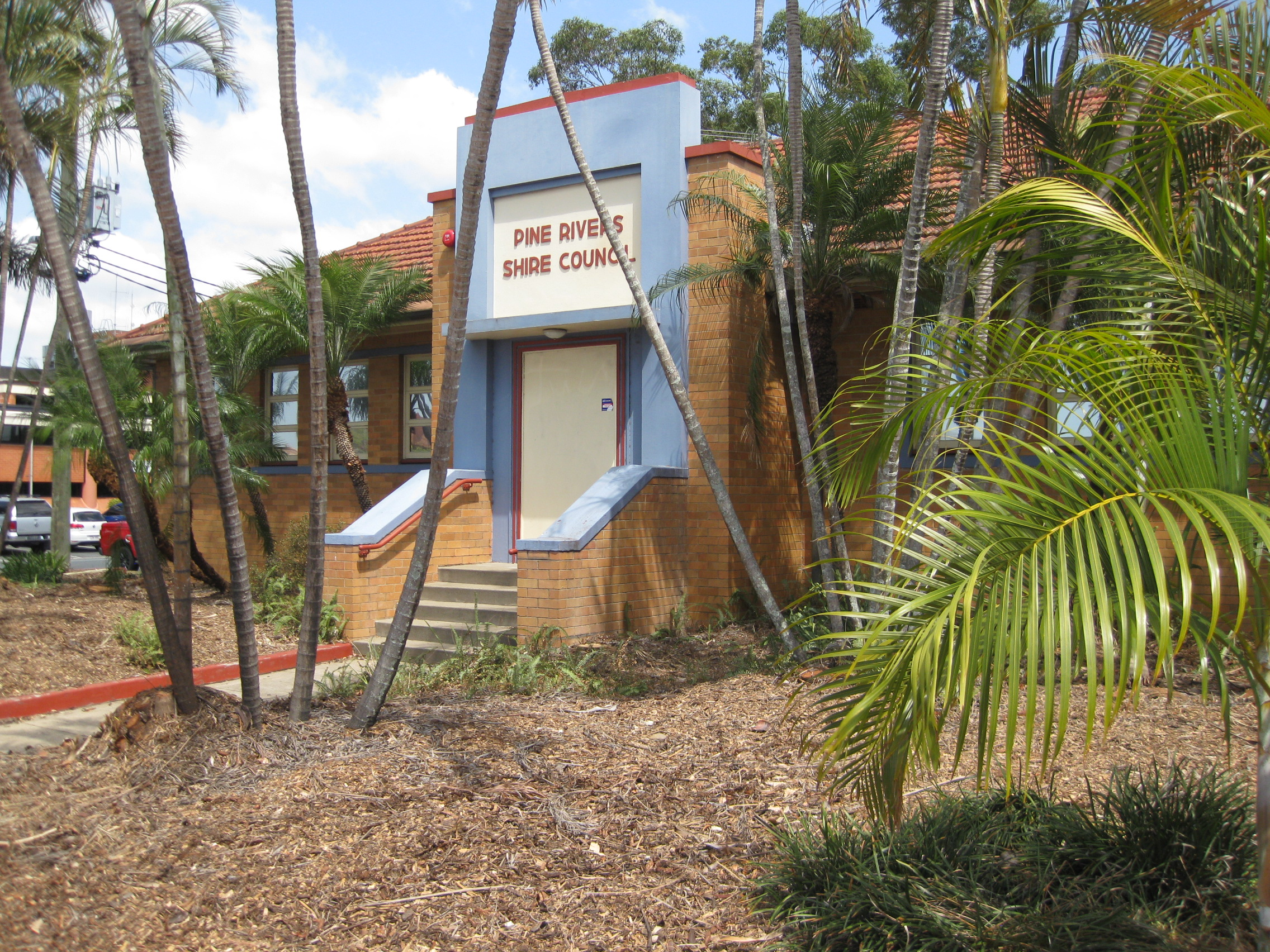
The Council Chambers built 1960 as it appeared in 2017. Note the bricked-up entrance.

Following the passage of the Local Authorities Act 1902, Pine Division became the Shire of Pine on 31 March 1903. It underwent significant changes in 1921 and 1955, and on 23 May 1959, the Shire of Pine was renamed Shire of Pine Rivers. In March 1960, Council Meetings moved from the original weatherboard Shire Hall to new brick Council Chambers.It then remained with the same name and boundaries for almost 50 years.

On 15 March 2008, under the Local Government (Reform Implementation) Act 2007 passed by the Parliament of Queensland on 10 August 2007, the Shire of Pine Rivers amalgamated with the Shire of Caboolture and the City of Redcliffe to form the Moreton Bay Region. The Local Government Reform Commission's reasoning was that it would unite all of Brisbane's northern suburbs beyond the Brisbane City boundary into one local government area which would, in its view, simplify and streamline planning, approvals and governance.

In July 2023, the Moreton Bay Region was renamed the City of Moreton Bay.

== Chairmen and mayors ==
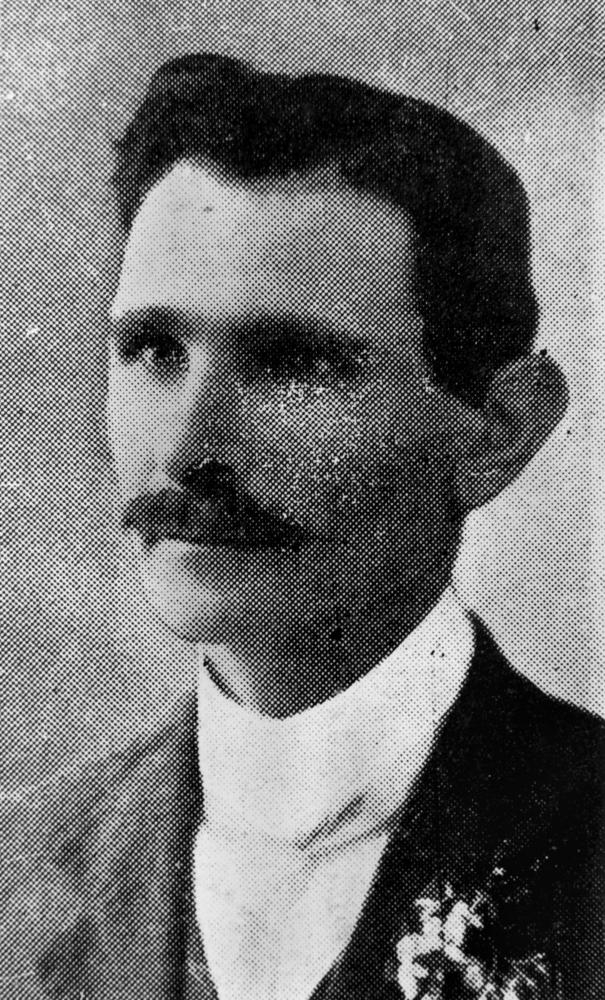
William Johnston, Chairman of the Pine Shire Council, 1909

The chairmen and mayors of the division and the shire were:

- 1888 Henry Thomas Ireland
- 1889 Robert Leitch
- 1890 Andrew Bell
- 1891 George Biggs
- 1892 William Fogg
- 1893–1894 Henry Thomas Ireland
- 1895–1896 George Biggs
- 1897 William Fogg
- 1898 John Leitch
- 1899 Charles Chilton
- 1900 John Leitch
- 1901 Charles Chilton
- 1902 George Biggs
- 1903 John Leitch
- 1904 Charles Thomas Williams
- 1905 Thomas Gardiner
- 1906 Patrick Fahey
- 1907 Edmund Page
- 1908 Thomas Gardiner
- 1909 William Johnston
- 1910 John Gilliland
- 1911 Alexander McNeven
- 1912 James Alexander Mecklem
- 1913 William Bradley junior
- 1914 Charles Edward Nicholas
- 1915–1917 William John Smith
- 1918 John Gilliland
- 1919 Robert Morrison
- 1920 William John Smith
- 1921–1927 William Bradley junior
- 1927–1930 Robert Morrison
- 1930–1933 Robert Thomas Bradley
- 1933–1950 William John Smith
- 1950–1973 John Sanders Bray
- 1973–1982 Leslie Edgar Hughes
- 1982–1985 Allan James Hughes
- 1985–1994 Robert George Akers
- 1994–2008 Yvonne Ann Chapman

In 1993, the Local Government Act Number 70 was introduced; it included that all heads of local government councils should be known as mayors and all other elected representatives were to be known as councillors. Thus Yvonne Chapman was both the first female leader of the council and its only mayor.

Other notable council members include:

- 1973–1979: Joe Kruger, Member of the Queensland Legislative Assembly for Murrumba

== Wards ==
In its final years, the Shire of Pine Rivers was split up into 10 divisions, each electing one councillor to the Shire Council for a four-year term. Additionally, a mayor was elected to represent the entire Shire.

- Division 1 – Dayboro and most of the rural area of the Shire
- Division 2 – Ferny Hills, Samford Valley, Arana Hills
- Division 3 – the 'Hills' area (Ferny Hills, Everton Hills)
- Division 4 – Contains Albany Creek and Eatons Hill
- Division 5 – Contains Warner, Cashmere
- Division 6 – Contains Brendale, Central Strathpine
- Division 7 – Contains Bray Park, Strathpine West, Lawnton South
- Division 8 – Contains Joyner, Lawnton, Petrie, Whiteside
- Division 9 – Contains Kurwongbah, Kallangur
- Division 10 – Contains North Lakes, Griffin, Murrumba Downs

== Suburbs ==
The Shire of Pine Rivers included the following suburbs:

=== Urban suburbs ===
- Albany Creek
- Arana Hills
- Bray Park
- Brendale^{U1}
- Eatons Hill
- Everton Hills
- Ferny Hills
- Griffin
- Kallangur
- Lawnton
- Mango Hill
- Murrumba Downs
- North Lakes^{U2}
- Petrie^{U3}
- Strathpine^{U4}
- Warner

^{U1} – light industrial area
^{U2} – newest suburb in the Shire
^{U3} – earliest township in the Shire
^{U4} – Shire council offices and Westfield Strathpine

=== Rural localities ===
- Armstrong Creek
- Bunya
- Camp Mountain
- Cashmere
- Cedar Creek
- Clear Mountain
- Closeburn
- Dakabin^{R1}
- Dayboro^{R2}
- Draper
- Highvale
- Jollys Lookout
- Joyner
- King Scrub
- Kobble Creek
- Kurwongbah
- Laceys Creek
- Mount Glorious
- Mount Nebo
- Mount Pleasant
- Mount Samson
- Ocean View
- Rush Creek
- Samford Valley
- Samford Village^{R2}
- Samsonvale
- Whiteside
- Wights Mountain
- Yugar

^{R1} – contained the shire's major landfill, and Alma Park Zoo
^{R2} – village and tourist centre

== Population ==
Year	Population	% Annual Growth
1933	4,604	
1947	4,815	
1954	6,309	3.94%
1961	8,761	4.80%
1966	13,309	8.72%
1971	26,187	14.50%
1976	45,192	11.53%
1981	58,189	5.19%
1986	73,783	4.86%
1991	87,892	3.56%
1996	103,192	3.26%
2001	119,236	2.93%
2006	141,414	3.47%
