= Everton Hills, Queensland =

Everton Hills
- Suburb
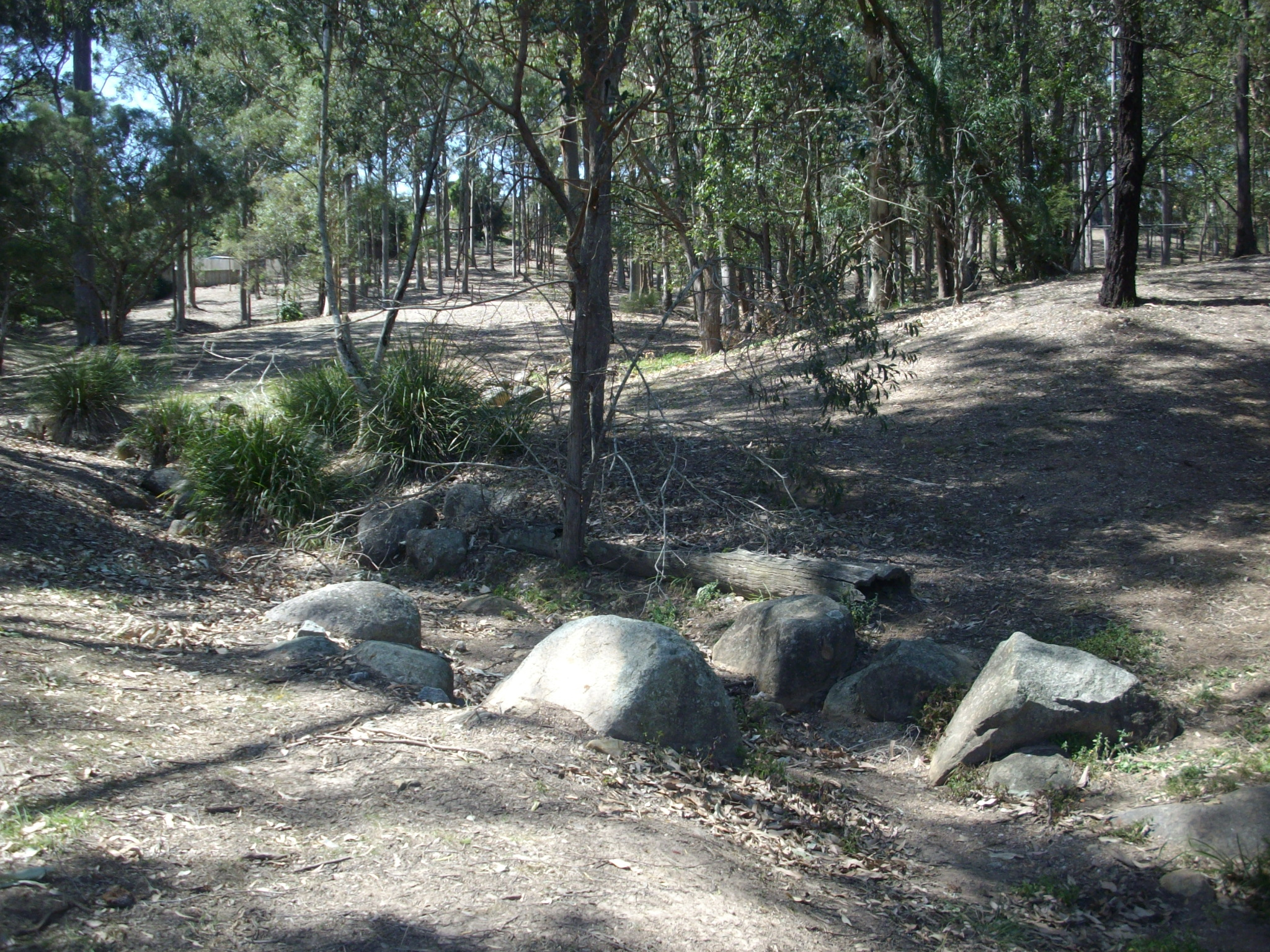
- Bowman Park, Everton Hills

- Interactive map of Everton Hills
- Coordinates: 27.3905°S 152.9725°E
- Country: Australia
- State: Queensland
- City: Moreton Bay
- LGA: City of Moreton Bay
- Location: 13.4 km (8.3 mi) SSW of Strathpine; 12.7 km (7.9 mi) NNW of Brisbane CBD

Government
  - State electorate: Everton
  - Federal division: Dickson

Area
  - Total: 3.3 km^{2} (1.3 sq mi)

Population
  - Total: 6,673 (2021 census)
  - Density: 2,022/km^{2} (5,240/sq mi)
- Time zone: UTC+10:00 (AEST)
- Postcode: 4053
Suburbs around Everton Hills
Bunya	Bunya	McDowall
Arana Hills	Everton Hills	Everton Park
Keperra	Mitchelton	Everton Park

Everton Hills is a suburb in the City of Moreton Bay, Queensland, Australia. In the 2021 census, Everton Hills had a population of 6,673 people.

== Geography ==
Located in the north-west of the Brisbane metropolitan area, the suburb extends northwest from Everton Park; this separation of suburbs is marked by a park called 'Boundary Park'. Everton Hills' southern boundary runs along the Kedron Brook, separating it from Mitchelton. It is also located at the edge of the Bunyaville Forest Reserve. Informally it is part of the Hills District.

== History ==
Everton Hills is situated in the Yugarabul traditional Indigenous Australian country.

Everton Hills takes its name from its neighbouring suburb Everton Park which in turn was named after the residence of pioneer settler Ambrose McDowall, who named his residence after Everton, a suburb in Liverpool, England.

In the 1890s, the town of Bunyaville (27.3903°S 152.9772°E) was located north of South Pine Road in the present-day suburbs of Everton Hills and Everton Park. Until 1891, it was known as Kedron after Kedron Brook which flows through the area.

Bunyaville Baptist Church opened on Saturday 2 July 1932. It was on Timms Road (now in Everton Hills) on land donated by Arthur Timms with some financial assistance from the Newmarket Baptist Church. It was built "in a day" on Saturday 4 June 1932. Later, it became known as the Everton Hills Baptist Church. Subsequently, the former baptist church building was relocated to the Hills Church at 79 Queens Road (27.3866°S 152.9820°E).

Prince of Peace Lutheran College opened on 3 January 1984. The Prince of Peace Lutheran Church opened adjacent to the school in 1986, having been previously located in Maundrell Terrace, Chermside West.

Until 2008, Everton Hills was in the Pine Rivers Shire, when amalgamated into the Moreton Bay Region, now known as the City of Moreton Bay.

== Demographics ==
In the 2011 census, Everton Hills recorded a population of 5,812 people, 50.7% female and 49.3% male. The median age of the Everton Hills population was 35 years, 2 years below the national median of 37. 81.5% of people living in Everton Hills were born in Australia. The other top responses for country of birth were England 3.5%, New Zealand 2.9%, Scotland 0.8%, Philippines 0.8%, South Africa 0.8%. 91.7% of people spoke only English at home; the next most common languages were 0.6% German, 0.4% Japanese, 0.4% Italian, 0.3% Afrikaans, 0.3% Vietnamese.

In the 2016 census, Everton Hills had a population of 5,938 people.

In the 2021 census, Everton Hills had a population of 6,673 people.

== Education ==
Prince of Peace Lutheran College is a secondary (7-12) campus for boys and girls of the Prince of Peace Lutheran College at 25 Henderson Road (27.3900°S 152.9662°E). The school's primary campus is in Everton Park. In 2018, the school had an enrolment of 752 students with 57 teachers (50 full-time equivalent) and 66 non-teaching staff (31 full-time equivalent).

There are no government schools in Everton Hills. The nearest government primary schools are McDowall State School in neighbouring McDowall to the north-east, Grovely State School in neighbouring Keperra to the south-west, and Everton Park State School in neighbouring Everton Park to the south-east. The nearest government secondary schools are Mitchelton State High School in neighbouring Mitchelton to the south, Everton Park State High School in neighbouring Everton Park to the south-east and Albany Creek State High School in Albany Creek to the north.

== Amenities ==
Everton Hills contains numerous hardware and automotive services, which include hardware, glaziers, landscapers, mechanics and smash repairs. The area's major shopping centre, Brookside Shopping Centre, is in the adjacent suburb Mitchelton, but here are also two convenience centres in Everton Hills; one in Camelia Avenue and another on Queens Road.

Hills Church is at 79 Queens Road (27.3867°S 152.9819°E). It is part of the Wesleyan Methodist Church.

The Prince of Peace Lutheran Church is at 20 Rogers Parade West, adjacent to the Prince of Peace Lutheran School campus (27.3917°S 152.9782°E).

The suburb is home to the Hills District PCYC.

== Political representatives ==
Tim Mander is the current sitting member of the Legislative Assembly of Queensland for Everton, having been elected at the 2012 Queensland state election by defeating Labor's Murray Watt (the Parliamentary Secretary to the Treasurer). Everton Hills is in the Federal Division of Dickson which Ali France of the Australian Labor Party currently holds, having unseated the sitting member, Peter Dutton in the 2025 Australian Federal Election . Everton Hills is in Division 10 of the Moreton Bay City Council, held since 2016 by Matt Constance.
