= Electoral district of Pine Rivers =

State electoral district of Queensland, Australia

Pine Rivers Queensland—Legislative Assembly
- Electoral map of Pine Rivers 2017
- State: Queensland
- Dates current: 1972–1992; 2009–present
- MP: Nikki Boyd
- Party: Labor
- Namesake: Pine Rivers
- Electors: 37,943 (2020)
- Area: 539 km^{2} (208.1 sq mi)
- Demographic: Outer-metropolitan
- Coordinates: 27°13′S 152°51′E
Electorates around Pine Rivers:
| Nanango | Glass House | Kurwongbah |
| Nanango | Pine Rivers | Murrumba; Aspley |
| Moggill | Cooper | Everton; Ferny Grove |

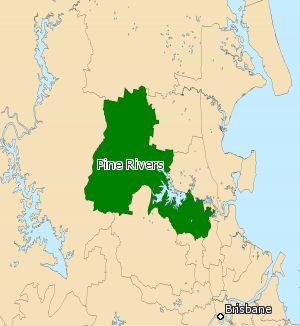
Electoral map of Pine Rivers 2008

Pine Rivers is an electoral district of the Legislative Assembly in the Australian state of Queensland.

It was first created for the 1972 state election, based in the Shire of Pine Rivers in the northern outskirts of Brisbane. It was abolished in 1992 and replaced by Kurwongbah for the 1992 state election. The final member for Pine Rivers, Margaret Woodgate, transferred to Kurwongbah.

Pine Rivers was reintroduced for the 2009 state election, essentially as Kurwongbah renamed. The name change from Kurwongbah was made necessary due to the redistribution excising the eponymous suburb from the district. Originally proposed to be called Samsonvale by the Electoral Commission of Queensland, the name Pine Rivers was adopted after further review.

== Members for Pine Rivers ==
First incarnation (1972–1992)
| Member | Party | Term |
|---|---|---|
| Ken Leese | Labor | 1972–1974 |
| Rob Akers | Liberal | 1974–1983 |
| Yvonne Chapman | National | 1983–1989 |
| Margaret Woodgate | Labor | 1989–1992 |
Second incarnation (2009–present)
| Member | Party | Term |
| Carolyn Male | Labor | 2009–2012 |
| Seath Holswich | Liberal National | 2012–2015 |
| Nikki Boyd | Labor | 2015–present |

== Election results ==
2024 Queensland state election: Pine Rivers
| Party | Candidate | Votes | % | ±% |
|---|---|---|---|---|
| Liberal National | Dean Clements | 15,082 | 41.25 | +4.85 |
| Labor | Nikki Boyd | 14,406 | 39.41 | −5.09 |
| Greens | Sonja Gerdsen | 3,546 | 9.70 | +0.30 |
| One Nation | Matthew Robinson | 2,472 | 6.76 | +1.66 |
| Animal Justice | Maureen Brohman | 1,052 | 2.88 | +1.28 |
| Total formal votes | | 36,558 | 97.08 | |
| Informal votes | | 1,098 | 2.92 | |
| Turnout | | 37,656 | 91.48 | |
Two-party-preferred result
| Labor | Nikki Boyd | 18,533 | 50.69 | −6.01 |
| Liberal National | Dean Clements | 18,025 | 49.31 | +6.01 |
| Labor hold | | Swing | –6.01 | |

Primary vote results in Pine Rivers (Second Incarnation) (Parties that have never gotten 5% of the vote are omitted)
Labor
Liberal National
Greens
One Nation
Katter's Australian
Independent
View source data.
Two-party-preferred vote vote results in Pine Rivers (Second Incarnation) View source data.
