= 1997 Kurwongbah state by-election =

A by-election was held in the Legislative Assembly of Queensland seat of Kurwongbah on 24 May 1997. It was triggered by the resignation of sitting Labor member Margaret Woodgate. The by-election was won by Labor candidate Linda Lavarch.

== Result ==
Kurwongbah state by-election, 1997
| Party | Candidate | Votes | % | ±% |
|---|---|---|---|---|
| Labor | Linda Lavarch | 10,148 | 48.19 | +3.20 |
| Liberal | Peter Rankin | 5,238 | 24.88 | −7.48 |
| Independent | Yvonne Moran | 3,173 | 15.07 | +15.07 |
| Greens | Kim Pantano | 1,359 | 6.45 | −2.76 |
| Independent | Rona Joyner | 521 | 2.47 | +2.47 |
| Shooters | Bev Salisbury | 452 | 2.15 | +2.15 |
| Independent | Peter Byrne | 167 | 0.79 | +0.79 |
| Total formal votes | | 21,056 | 98.14 | −0.42 |
| Informal votes | | 400 | 1.86 | +0.42 |
| Turnout | | 21,456 | 84.37 | |
Two-party-preferred result
| Labor | Linda Lavarch | 11,484 | 60.20 | +8.25 |
| Liberal | Peter Rankin | 7,580 | 39.80 | −8.25 |
| Labor hold | | Swing | +8.25 | |

== See also ==
- List of Queensland state by-elections
