= Prince of Peace Lutheran College =

Location
- 20 Rogers Parade West, Everton Hills; Brisbane, Queensland, 4053; Australia; 27.3896°S 152.9654°E

Information
- Type: Independent, co-educational, day
- Motto: Nurturing God-given potential
- Established: 1984
- Principal: Dr Susan Carter
- Employees: 105
- Grades: K–12
- Enrolment: 660 (Kindy–Year 12)
- Campus: Junior Campus (K–6); Senior Campus (7–12)
- Colours: White, light blue and dark blue
- Affiliation: Lutheran
- Website: www.princeofpeace.qld.edu.au

Prince of Peace Lutheran College is an independent co-educational Lutheran K-12 school located in the leafy Brisbane suburb of Everton Hills, Queensland, Australia. It is administered by Independent Schools Queensland, with an enrolment of 660 students and a teaching staff of 105, as of 2025. The school caters to students from Kindergarten to Year 12, on two closely located campuses.

The Junior Campus precinct on Rogers Parade West caters to students from Prep to Year 6. The Kindergarten and Outside Hours School Care facilities are also based on the Junior Campus. The Senior Campus, which is approximately 1.5 kilometres (0.9 mi) from the Junior Campus provides education for students in Years 7 to 12.

== Houses ==
There are 4 houses at Prince of Peace Lutheran College:

Name	Colour	Name origin
Bradman	Green	Don Bradman
Fraser	Blue	Dawn Fraser
Jackson	Red	Marjorie Jackson-Nelson
Laver	Yellow	Rod Laver

== Notable alumni ==
- Tayla Harris – Brisbane Lions player
- Taymon Kenton-Smith – Paralympian archer
- Samuel Short – Australian swimmer

== See also ==
- List of schools in Greater Brisbane
