= Hills District, Queensland =

Coordinates: 27.3915°S 152.9522°E

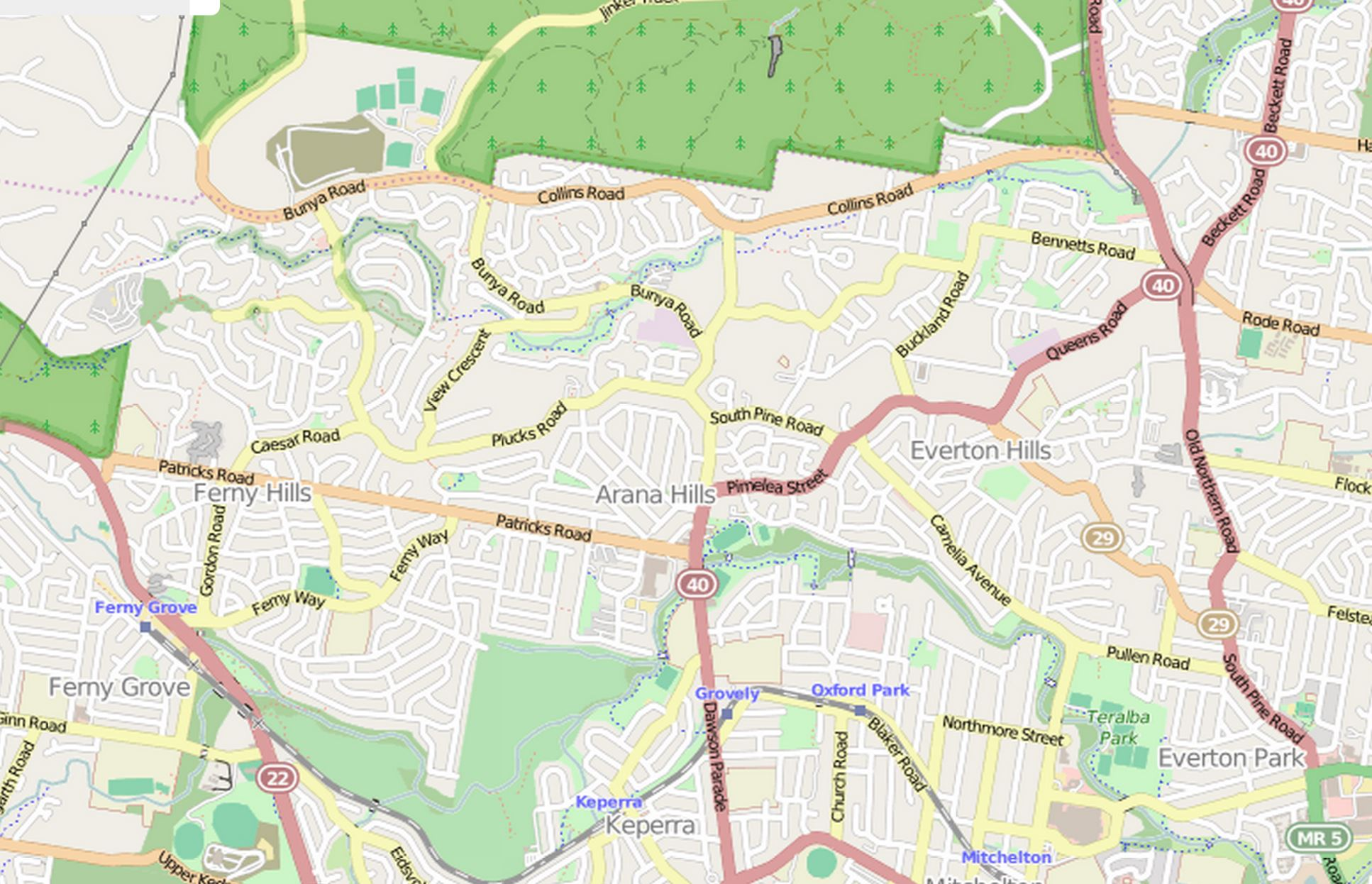
Hills District, 2015

The Hills District is the name of group of suburbs in the City of Moreton Bay, Queensland, Australia. Although informally defined, the term traditionally refers to Ferny Hills, Arana Hills, and Everton Hills.

== Geography ==
The Hills District is bounded to the south by Kedron Brook Creek and to the north by the forested areas of Bunya.

== History ==
Suburban development in the Hills District commenced in the Arana Hills area in 1957, in the Everton Hills area in 1959 and in the Ferny Hills area in 1960. These developments were the progressive extensions of the suburbs Keperra, Everton Park and Ferny Grove, which lie to the south of Kedron Brook Creek and are within the City of Brisbane. However, with the spread of urban development into the southern part of the suburb Bunya in the 1980s, the term may also encompass this area.
