= Pine Rivers Shire Hall =

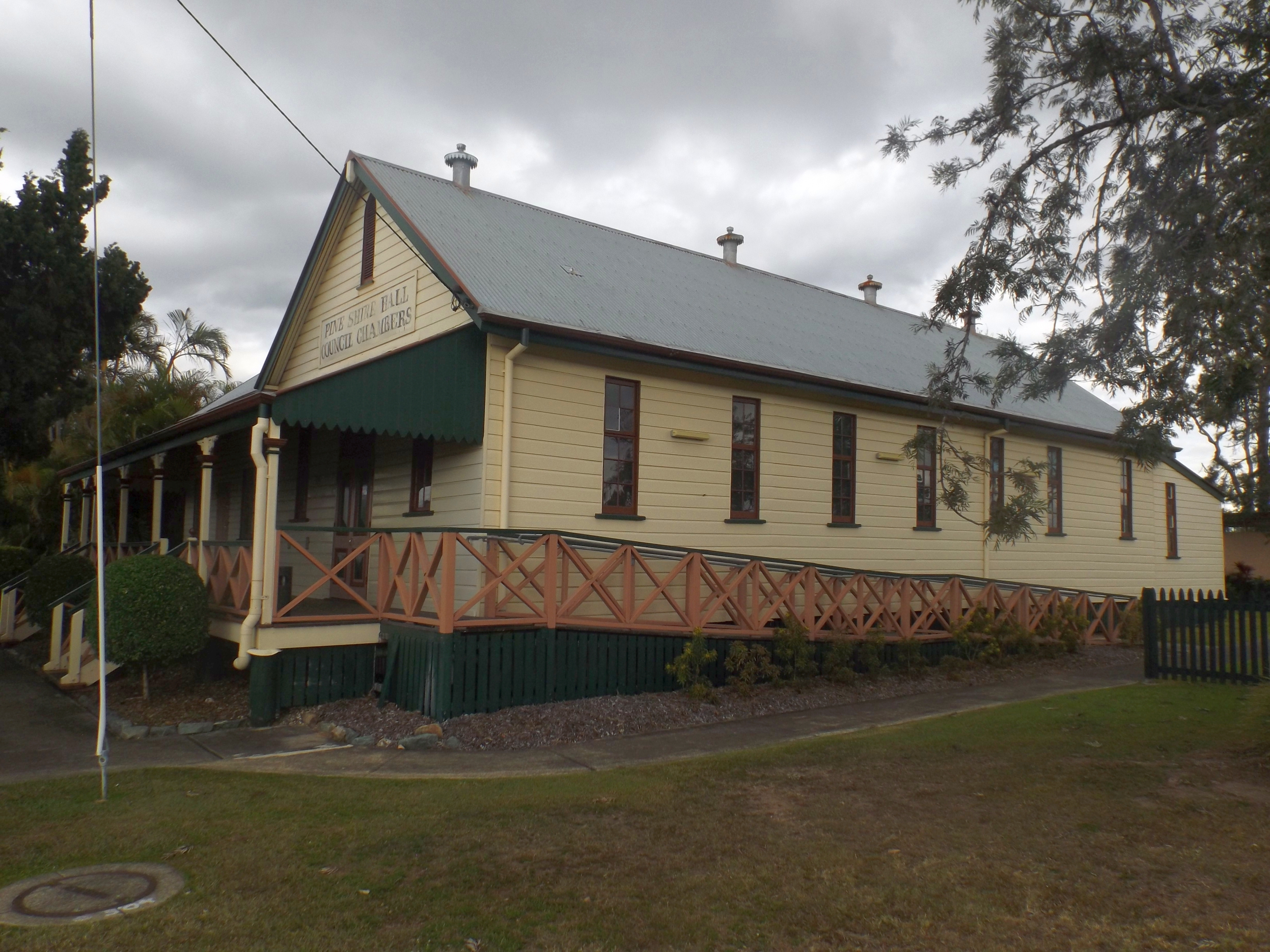
- Building in 2016

- Location within Queensland Location within Australia
- 27.3096°S 152.9901°E
- Location: 238 Gympie Road, Strathpine, City of Moreton Bay, Queensland, Australia

History
- Design period: 1870s–1890s (late 19th century)
- Built: 1889–1935

Queensland Heritage Register
- Official name: Pine Rivers Shire Hall (former), Pine Divisional Board Hall, Pine Rivers Shire Hall, Pine Shire Hall
- Type: state heritage (built)
- Designated: 21 October 1992
- Reference no.: 600768
- Significant period: 1889–1935 (fabric); 1880s–1950s (historical, social); 1940s (WWII)
- Significant components: strong room, office/s, memorial – honour board/ roll of honour, hall

Pine Rivers Shire Hall is a heritage-listed town hall at 238 Gympie Road, Strathpine, City of Moreton Bay, Queensland, Australia. It was built from 1889 to 1935. It is also known as Pine Divisional Board Hall, Pine Rivers Shire Hall, and Pine Shire Hall. It was added to the Queensland Heritage Register on 21 October 1992.

== History ==
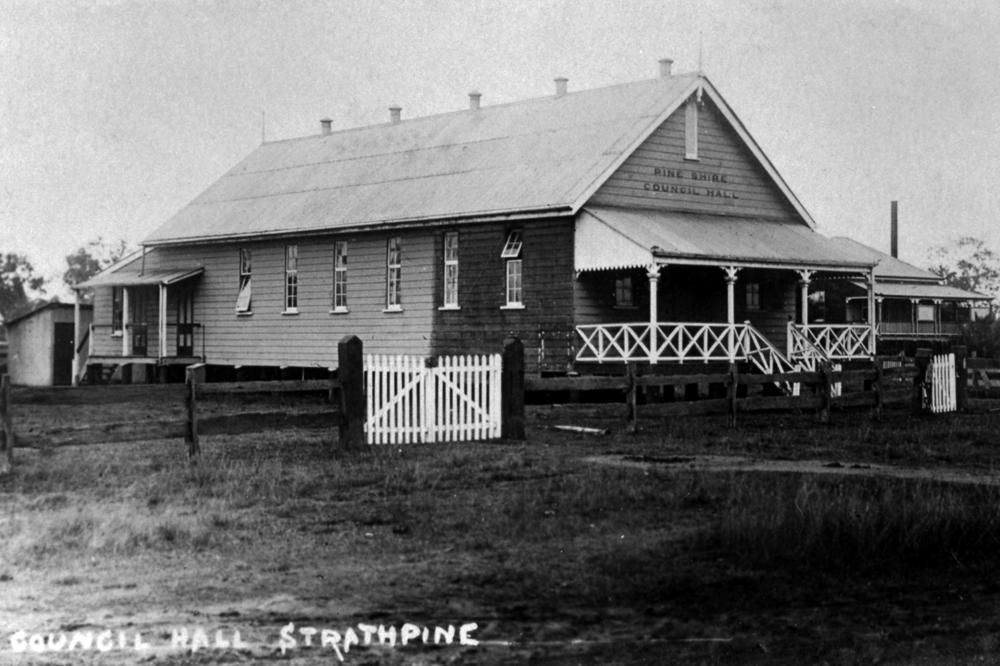
Postcard of the Pine Shire Council Hall, circa 1920

The rectangular first stage of this single-storeyed timber shire hall was built in 1889 and there have been three main extensions.

The Pine Rivers area was opened up for selection during the 1860s. Settlers moved in, villages began to develop and the railway reached Strathpine in 1887. The Pine Rivers area was part of the Caboolture Divisional Board until 1888 when the Pine Divisional Board was gazetted. Early in 1889 the board called for tenders for a building 45 by 25 feet (13.7 by 7.6 m) and L Macklewright's tender for £229/18/6 was accepted.

The hall was used for division business and as a venue for social activities and by church groups. The first extension was the front extension, probably during the early 1890s. As a result of the Local Government Act 1902 the board changed their name to the Pine Shire Council. In 1905, a skillion roofed office at the rear of the hall was constructed. The Strathpine Patriotic League, in 1921, commissioned an honour board to be hung in the hall. In 1924 the end wall was lined to better display the war memorial and photographs. During 1932 there were two additions made to the hall along the southern elevation; an office 20 by 25 feet (6.1 by 7.6 m) and a glassed in side verandah about 36 by 14 feet (11.0 by 4.3 m). The strong room was added to the 1932 additions about 1935.

During the Second World War the hall was used by the US Army as a recreational hall. Afterwards the hall continued to be well patronised as a social and recreational venue. In the early 1950s the hall was leased to A Charles Spencer as a picture theatre. In 1959, the Pine Shire became the Pine Rivers Shire Council and in 1960 they moved into the new brick Shire Office built beside the Shire Hall.

During the 1960s the hall and side verandah were used for the councils building and engineering sections. A door was cut into the northern elevation to provide access to the engineers section. The front office was rented as a real estate office, and office space was provided for a visiting bank officer and doctor. The office in 1970s was the site of the first shire library. By 1978–79 the site was vacated by council officers and it was in a very dilapidated condition. It was refurbished during the 1980s and was leased in July 1985 to a theatre group. With the growth of the shire extra accommodation was required. A new Civic Centre was opened in 1974 and an Administration building in 1978. In 1986, the councils expanded office staff, required the re-use of the 1959 shire offices, and the building is now the health offices.

== Description ==
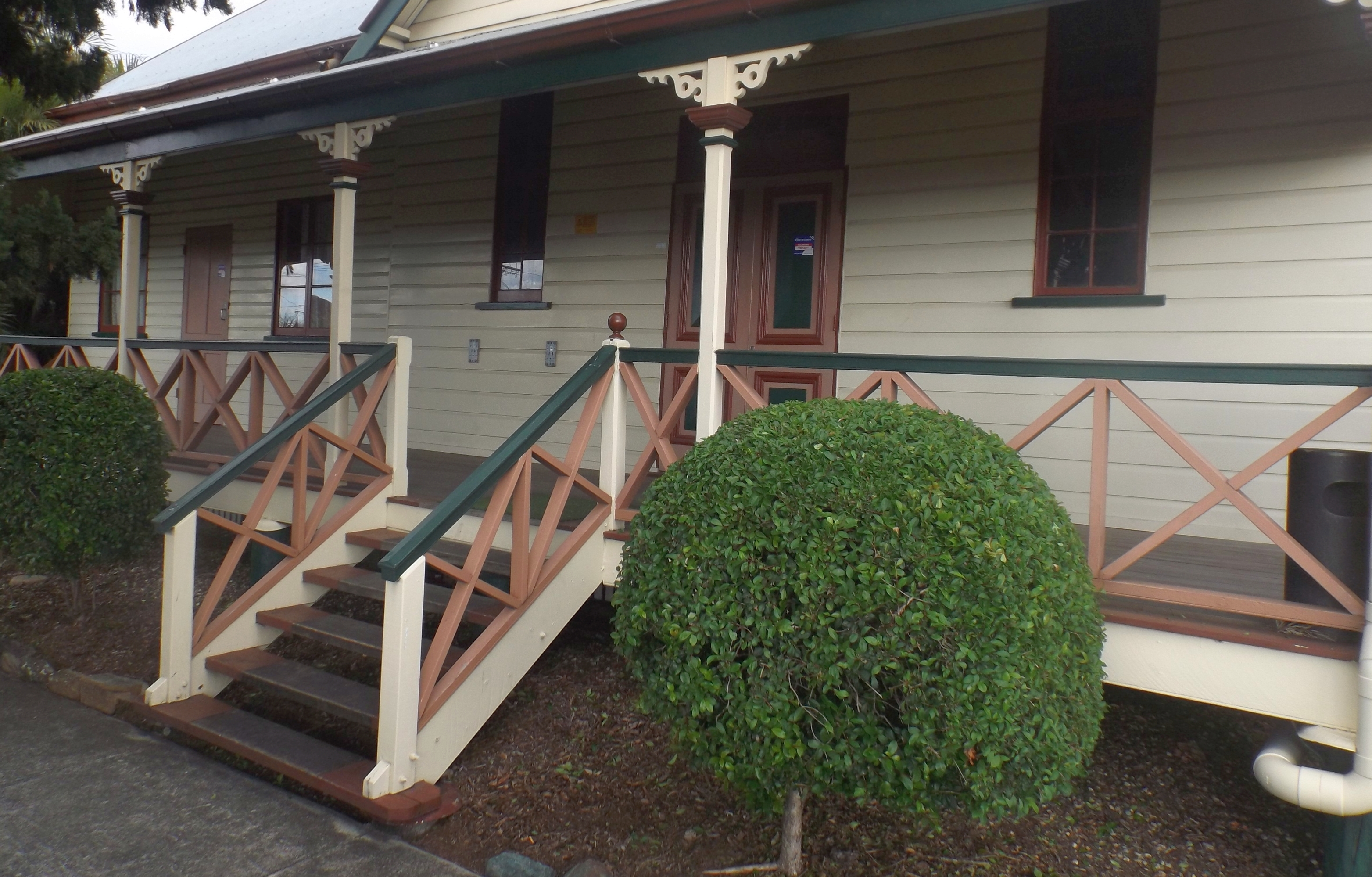
Front verandah

This single-storeyed chamferboard building with a corrugated iron gabled roof is located fronting Gympie Road and is part of a group of Pine Shire Council buildings. The building sits on timber stumps with batten infill panels to the perimeter. The roof over the hall features four metal ridge ventilators and a single lancet shaped vent to the front and rear gables.

The street elevation has a verandah with a corrugated iron roof and cross braced timber balustrades. The building is painted to indicate the two major stages of construction with different decorative timber work to the verandah and two entrance stairs. The entrance doors to the hall are timber panelled with a fanlight but are not used in the current layout. At the rear of the L-shaped building is an attached dressing room with a corrugated iron skillion roof, single skin chamferboard walls and pine board raked ceiling.

The hall has a flat boarded ceiling which is raked on either side and features circular fretwork vents. The walls are lined with fibrous cement sheets with timber cover strips and the multi-paned windows pivot horizontally at the centre. The room has raised freestanding seating at the street end and a raised stage opposite, with lighting and curtains hung from the ceiling by metal supports.

On the southern side is a child-care room with a corrugated iron skillion roof. The original windows to the hall have been enclosed and the external walls of weatherboard and vertically jointed boards have been lined with fibrous cement sheets. A rear porch and stairs are attached to the southwest.

On the southern side, at the rear of the office, is a concrete strongroom with a steel door. The office has been partitioned with a kitchen and storeroom. The walls have a dado with vertically jointed boards below and pine plywood panelling above to the picture rail. The ceiling and upper walls are lined with fibrous cement sheets with timber cover strips and the casement windows have pressed metal sunhoods on the southeast.

== Heritage listing ==
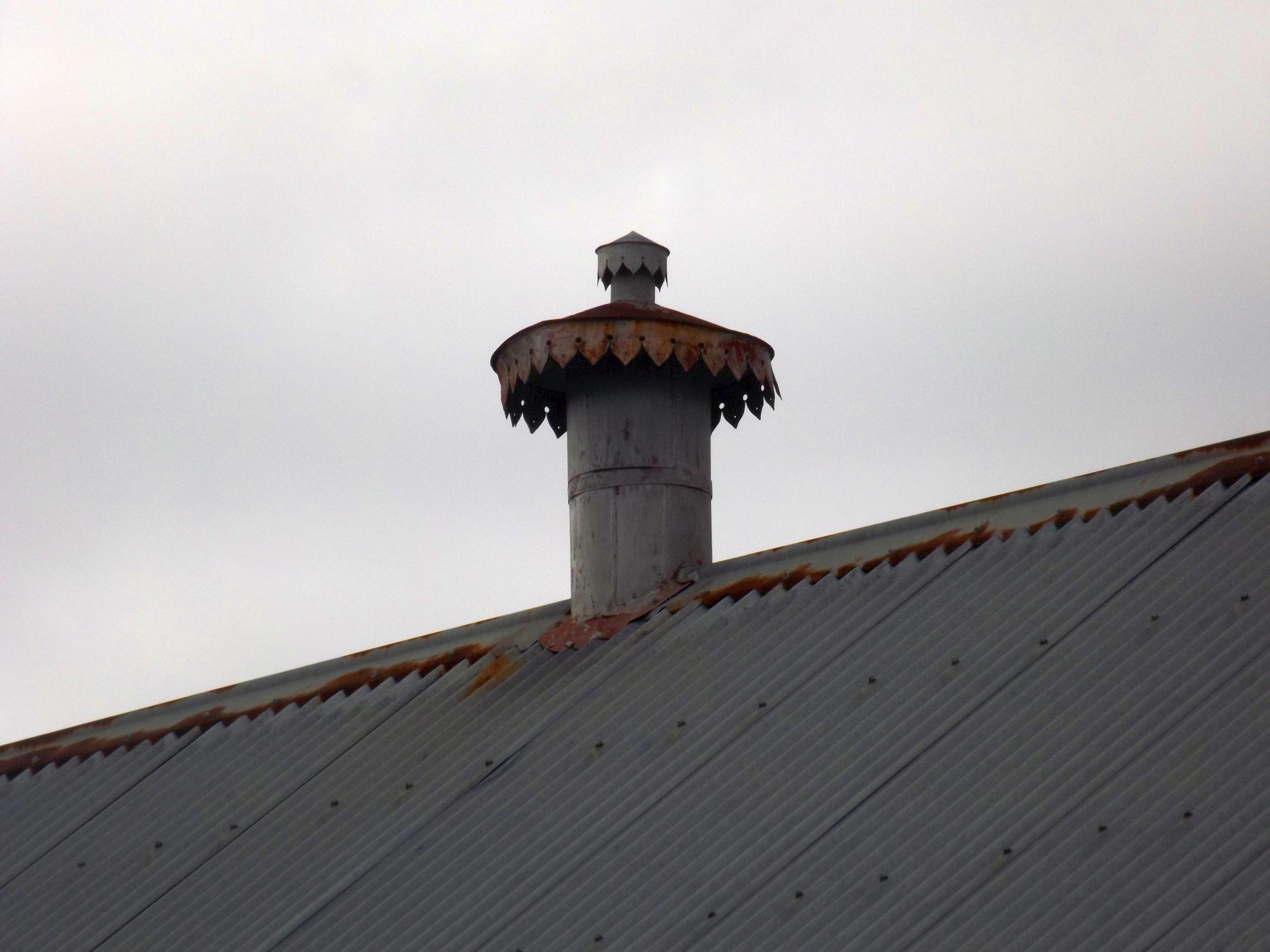
Ridge ventilator

The former Pine Rivers Shire Hall was listed on the Queensland Heritage Register on 21 October 1992 having satisfied the following criteria.

The place is important in demonstrating the evolution or pattern of Queensland's history.

With the associated council buildings, the hall demonstrates the growth of the Pine Rivers Shire Council from 1888 to the present day.

The place is important in demonstrating the principal characteristics of a particular class of cultural places.

The hall is an example of a late 1880s local government building.

The place is important because of its aesthetic significance.

The hall has aesthetic value and contributes to the streetscape of the Pine River Shire Council group of buildings.

The place has a strong or special association with a particular community or cultural group for social, cultural or spiritual reasons.

The hall has an important role in the community life of Pine Shire residents.

The place has a special association with the life or work of a particular person, group or organisation of importance in Queensland's history.

With the associated council buildings, the hall demonstrates the growth of the Pine Rivers Shire Council from 1888 to the present day.
