= Ferny Hills, Queensland =

Ferny Hills Moreton Bay, Queensland
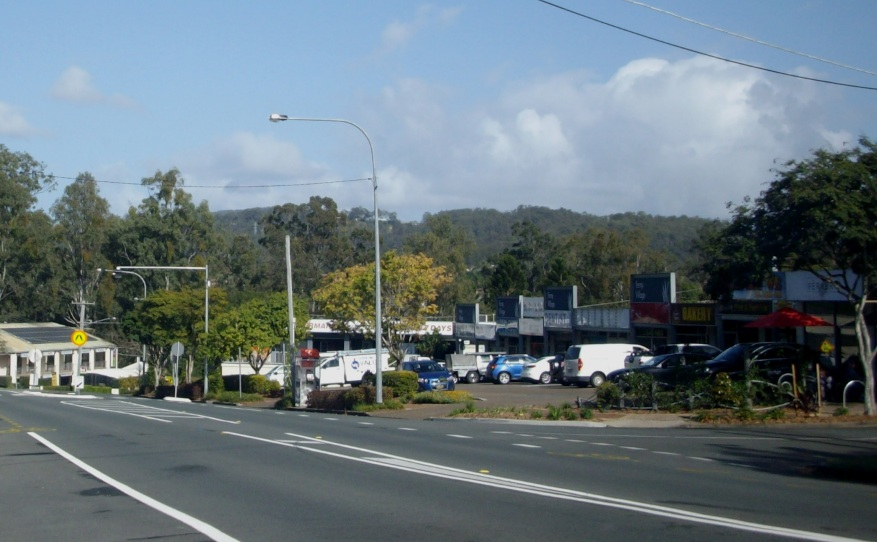
- Ferny Way, Ferny Hills

- Coordinates: 27.3916°S 152.9255°E
- Population: 8,726 (2021 census)
  - Density: 855/km^{2} (2,216/sq mi)
- Postcode(s): 4055
- Area: 10.2 km^{2} (3.9 sq mi)
- Time zone: AEST (UTC+10:00)
- Location: 15.9 km (10 mi) NW of Strathpine; 16.1 km (10 mi) NW of Brisbane CBD
- LGA(s): City of Moreton Bay
- State electorate(s): Ferny Grove
- Federal division(s): Dickson
Suburbs around Ferny Hills:
Samford Valley; Draper	Bunya	Bunya
Camp Mountain	Ferny Hills	Arana Hills
Upper Kedron	Ferny Grove	Keperra

Ferny Hills is a suburb in the City of Moreton Bay, Queensland, Australia. In the 2021 census, Ferny Hills had a population of 8,726 people.

== Geography ==
Ferny Hills is north-west of Brisbane, the state capital, and is located along Samford Road. Informally it is part of the Hills District.

The western part of the suburb is within the Samford Conservation Park. The eastern part of the suburb is residential.

== History ==
Ferny Hills is situated in the Yugarabul traditional Indigenous Australian country.

Ferny Way State School opened on 27 January 1970. In 1973 it was renamed Ferny Hills State School.

Patricks Road State School opened on 24 January 1977.

Until 2006, a notable feature of Ferny Hills was the Australian Woolshed, which was an Australian farming and wildlife attraction featuring shows and animal exhibits. This has since been demolished and a residential development has been built called 'Woolshed Grove' paying homage to its previous life. The Australian Woolshed was also featured as a setting in Episode 12, Season 4 of The Amazing Race.

== Demographics ==
In the 2011 census, Ferny Hills had a population of 8,721 people, 50.1% female and 49.9% male. The median age of the Ferny Hills population was 36 years, 1 year below the national median of 37. 82.6% of people living in Ferny Hills were born in Australia. The other top responses for country of birth were England 4.4%, New Zealand 3.6%, South Africa 0.8%, Scotland 0.6%, India 0.4%. 94.3% of people spoke only English at home; the next most common languages were 0.5% Italian, 0.3% German, 0.2% Polish, 0.2% Spanish, 0.2% Mandarin.

In the 2016 census, Ferny Hills had a population of 8,739 people.

In the 2021 census, Ferny Hills had a population of 8,726 people.

== Education ==
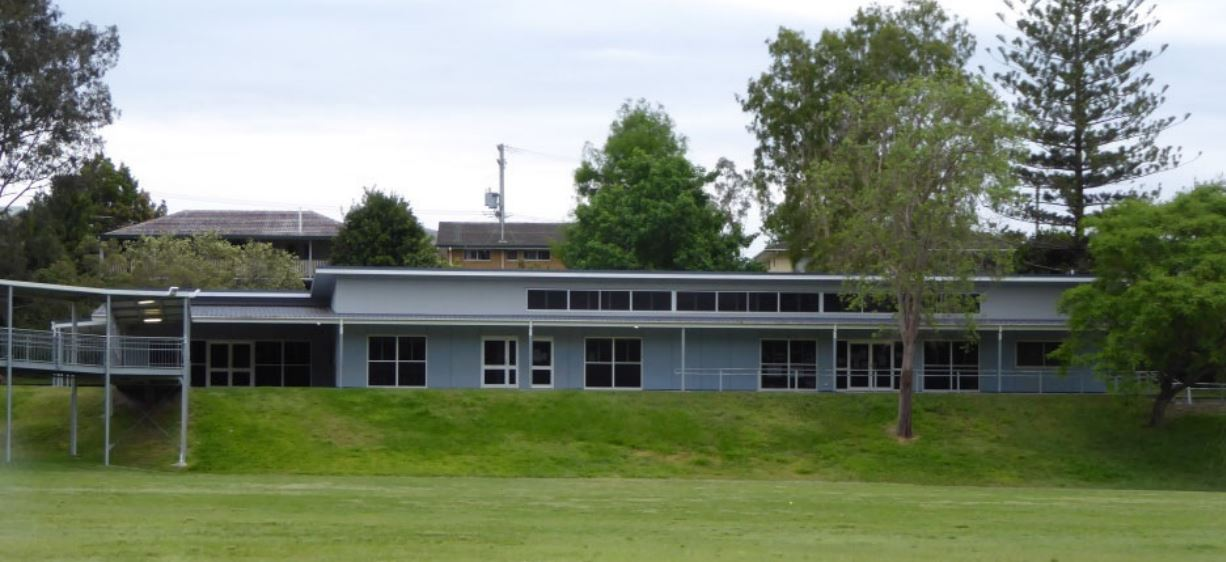
Ferny Hills State School, 2025

Ferny Hills State School is a government primary (Prep-6) school for boys and girls at 30-56 Illuta Avenue (27.4020°S 152.9433°E). In 2018, the school had an enrolment of 343 students with 31 teachers (25 full-time equivalent) and 23 non-teaching staff (14 full-time equivalent). It includes a special education program.

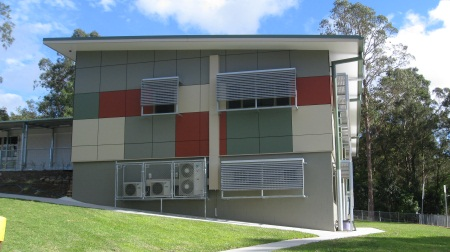
Library, Patricks Road State School, 2025

Patricks Road State School is a government primary (Prep-6) school for boys and girls at 238-256 Patricks Road (27.3932°S 152.9348°E). In 2018, the school had an enrolment of 789 students with 56 teachers (49 full-time equivalent) and 28 non-teaching staff (19 full-time equivalent). It includes a special education program.

There is no secondary school in Ferny Hills. The nearest government secondary school is Ferny Grove State High School in neighbouring Ferny Grove to the south.
