= Arana Hills, Queensland =

Arana Hills
- Suburb
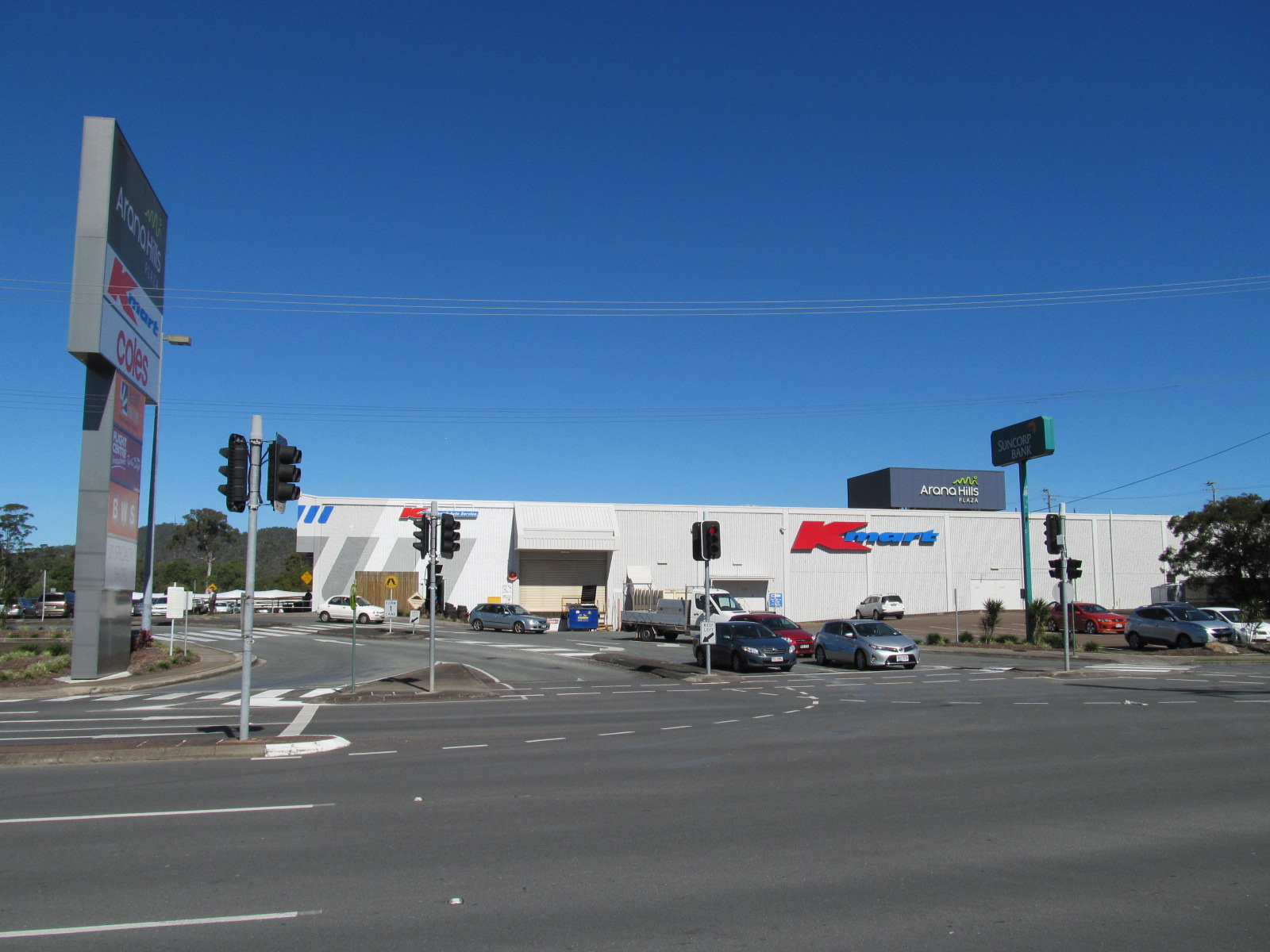
- Arana Hills Plaza, 2013

- Interactive map of Arana Hills
- Coordinates: 27.3933°S 152.9547°E
- Country: Australia
- State: Queensland
- City: Moreton Bay
- LGA: City of Moreton Bay
- Location: 3.9 km (2.4 mi) NW of Mitchelton; 4.1 km (2.5 mi) NE of Ferny Grove; 14.9 km (9.3 mi) SSW of Strathpine; 14.4 km (8.9 mi) NW of Brisbane CBD

Government
  - State electorate: Ferny Grove
  - Federal division: Dickson

Area
  - Total: 3.7 km^{2} (1.4 sq mi)

Population
  - Total: 6,971 (2021 census)
  - Density: 1,884/km^{2} (4,880/sq mi)
- Time zone: UTC+10:00 (AEST)
- Postcode: 4054
Suburbs around Arana Hills
Bunya	Bunya	Bunya
Ferny Hills	Arana Hills	Everton Hills
Ferny Grove	Keperra	Keperra

Arana Hills is a suburb in Division 10 of the City of Moreton Bay, Queensland, Australia. In the 2021 census, Arana Hills had a population of 6,971 people.

== Geography ==
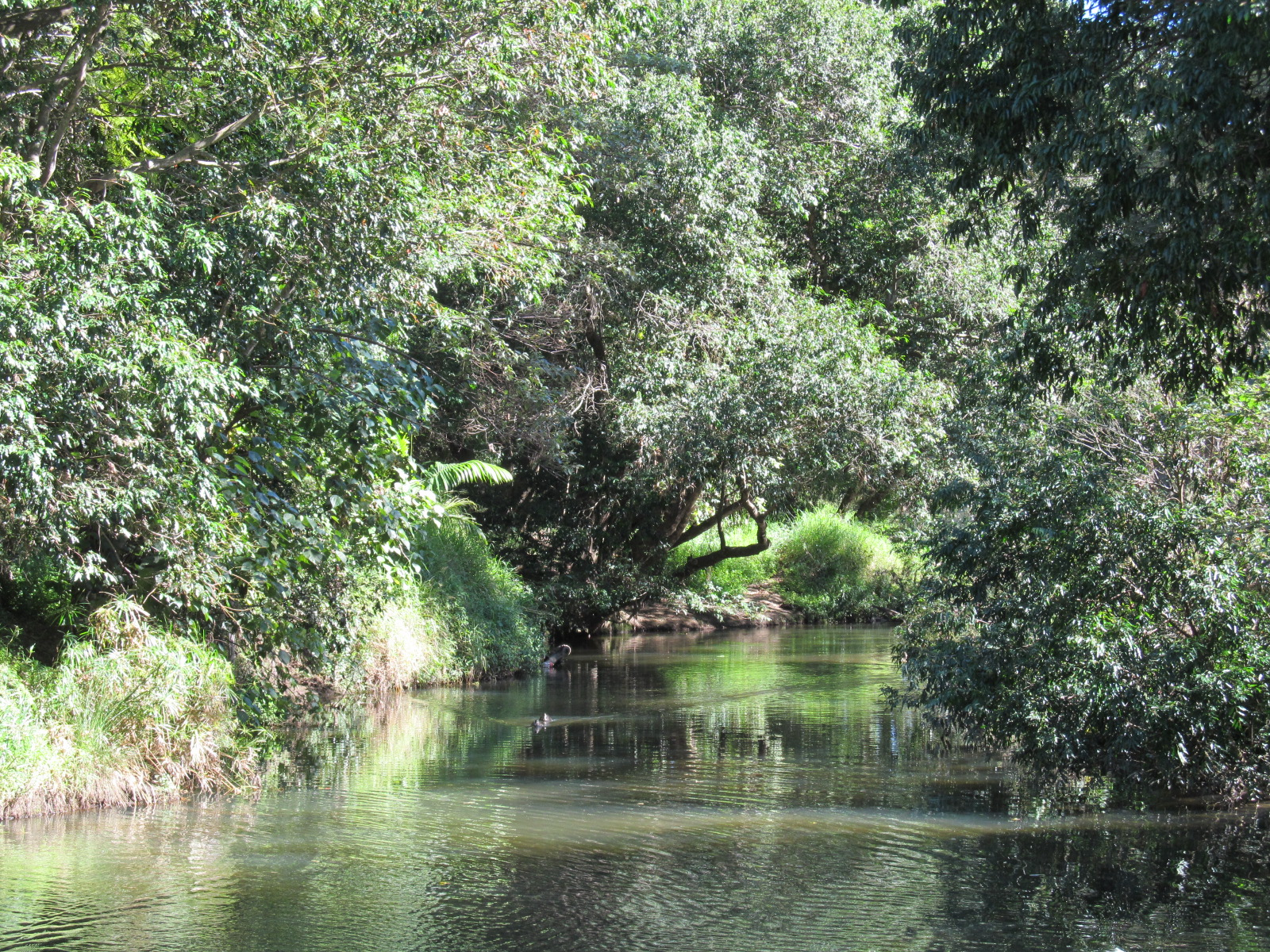
Kedron Brook, 2013

Arana Hills is located 14.4 kilometres (8.9 mi) north-west of Brisbane, the capital city of Queensland. It adjoins the Bunyaville Forest Reserve. Informally it is part of the Hills District.

Arana Hills lies within the northern part of the Kedron Brook catchment, although the waterway itself does not flow through the suburb.

== History ==
Until the 1950s the area still known informally as the Hills District was scattered with forest and small farms. In 1878, Frederick and Elizabeth Patrick purchased the first land in the area now known as Arana Hills. Today’s suburban landscape did not begin to emerge until the area was subdivided in 1937.

In 1956, the first modern suburban subdivision in the Shire of Pine Rivers was established in Arana Hills by Willmore and Randell. Marketed as Camden Park, land sales were phenomenal as the price was not exorbitant.

As there were several places named Camden Park, a public meeting was called in March 1962, with suggestions for adopting a new name. In June 1962 the name Arana Hills, from an Aboriginal name that it was assumed meant welcome, was submitted to council by the Camden Park Progress Association. The Queensland Place Names Board gave its approval and the new name was gazetted in December 1962. Later it was discovered that Arana was an Aboriginal word referring to the moon.

Pine Community School opened in Arana Hills on 24 January 1983.

Arana Hills remained part of the Pine Rivers shire until 2008, when it amalgamated with councils further north and east to form the Moreton Bay Region, now known as the City of Moreton Bay.

In 2008, Arana Hills was affected by severe thunderstorms that also affected many properties in northern Brisbane, causing millions of dollars of damage. Many volunteers and SES crews were needed to help clean up the damage. The area has now returned to its original state, but with the loss of some trees.

== Demographics ==
In the 2011 census, Arana Hills recorded a population of 6,313 people, 51% female and 49% male. The median age of the Arana Hills population was 35 years, 2 years below the national median of 37. 82.5% of people living in Arana Hills were born in Australia. The other top responses for country of birth were England 3.5%, New Zealand 3.3%, South Africa 0.9%, Scotland 0.5%, Papua New Guinea 0.5%. 92.7% of people spoke only English at home; the next most common languages were 0.4% Hindi, 0.4% Cantonese, 0.4% Italian, 0.3% Afrikaans, 0.3% German.

In the 2016 census, Arana Hills had a population of 6,810 people.

In the 2021 census, Arana Hills had a population of 6,971 people.

== Education ==
Pine Community School is a private primary (Prep-6) school for boys and girls at 123 Bunya Road (27.3874°S 152.9629°E). In 2018, the school had an enrolment of 94 students with 11 teachers (9 full-time equivalent) and 8 non-teaching staff (6 full-time equivalent).

There are no government schools in Arana Hills. The nearest government primary schools are Grovely State School in neighbouring Keperra to the south-east, Ferny Hills State School in neighbouring Ferny Hills to the south-west, and Patricks Road State School also in neighbouring Ferny Hills to the west. The nearest government secondary schools are Mitchelton State High School in Mitchelton to the south-east and Ferny Grove State High School in Ferny Grove to the south-west.

== Amenities ==
Arana Hills is served by several neighbourhood shopping villages as well as a commercial indoor shopping complex anchored by a Kmart and Coles supermarket which opened in 1978.

The Moreton Bay City Council operates a Public Library in Arana Hills at 63 Cobbity Crescent, opened in 1976.

Arana Hills Uniting Church (also known as The Hills Uniting Church) is at 14 Alstonia Street (27.3993°S 152.953°E). The Anglican Church of Australia for the Grovely Parish is All Saints Church, located in Cobbity Crescent (27.3950°S 152.948°E).

=== Parks ===
There are a number of parks in the area:

- Bandicoot Gully (27.3868°S 152.9488°E)
- Bob O'Neil Park (27.3889°S 152.9598°E)
- Brian Battersby Reserve (27.3874°S 152.9464°E)
- Camden Park (27.3946°S 152.9549°E)
- John Carter Park (27.3853°S 152.9594°E)
- Leslie Patrick Park (27.3969°S 152.9630°E)
- Sue Miller Park (27.3980°S 152.9540°E)
- Wightman Reserve (27.3837°S 152.9462°E)
- William Scott Park (27.3885°S 152.9542°E)

== Sources ==
- Welch, Melva A. (1984). "Bowling along with the Patricks at Mt Pleasant Homestead"
- Welch, Melva A. (1981). "Toponymy, a list of placenames in the Hills & Bunya Districts"
- Smith, Lawrence S. (1988). "Tracks and Times; A history of the Pine Rivers district"
