= Yvonne Chapman (politician) =

Australian politician (1940–2024)

Member of the Queensland Legislative Assembly for Pine Rivers
- In office 22 October 1983 – 2 December 1989
- Preceded by: Rob Akers
- Succeeded by: Margaret Woodgate

Personal details
- Born: Yvonne Ann Owen; 20 January 1940 Brisbane, Queensland, Australia
- Died: 27 October 2024 (aged 84) City of Moreton Bay, Queensland, Australia
- Party: National Party
- Spouse: Graeme Chapman (m.1957)
- Occupation: Secretary, businessperson

Yvonne Ann Chapman (20 January 1940 – 27 October 2024) was an Australian politician with the National Party. She was a Queensland Member of Parliament from 1983 until 1989 where she was for a time Minister for Family Services in the Bjelke-Petersen Government and Minister for Transport and Ethnic Affairs in the Cooper Government, and Mayor of the Shire of Pine Rivers (1994–2008).

== Background ==
Chapman contested the 1994 mayoral election against sitting Shire Chairman Rob Akers and 4 others. In addition to being the first time the Shire elected a Mayor, it was also the first time a preferential ballot was used. Akers received the majority of the first preferences but Chapman was victorious after the distribution of preferences.

This was the second time Chapman had defeated Rob Akers at a significant election, having taken the Queensland Parliamentary seat of Pine Rivers from him in 1983.

== Retirement and death ==
Chapman retired from politics in 2008 after the abolition of her native Shire of Pine Rivers and its merger into the larger Moreton Bay Regional Council, neither contesting the mayoral nor council ballots for the new entity.

Chapman died in the City of Moreton Bay on 27 October 2024, at the age of 84.

== Legacy ==
Chapman was the first woman to hold a Cabinet position in the Queensland Parliament, and was the first and last Mayor of Pine Rivers Shire (previous leaders of the council were known as the Shire Chairman). Chapman established herself as a conservative persona, maintaining Pine Rivers to be a 'clean' shire.

She was also vocally opposed to homosexuality and campaigned against decriminalisation of homosexuality in Queensland.

Parliament of Queensland
| Preceded by Rob Akers | Member for Pine Rivers; 1983–1989 | Succeeded by Margaret Woodgate |
