= Ken Leese =

Australian politician (born 1928)

Member of the Queensland Legislative Assembly for Pine Rivers
- In office 27 May 1972 – 7 Dec 1974
- Preceded by: New seat
- Succeeded by: Rob Akers

Personal details
- Born: Kenneth James Leese; 25 November 1928 Fenton, Staffordshire, England
- Party: Labor
- Spouse: Jean Henshall (m.1953)
- Occupation: Aeroengineer

Kenneth James Leese (born 25 November 1928) is an Australian former politician who was a member of the Queensland Legislative Assembly.

== Biography ==
Leese was born at Fenton, Staffordshire, the son of James William Leese and his wife Florence Gertrude (née Bailey). He was educated at the Heron Cross Primary School and went on to the Modern United Kingdom Technical College. After finishing his education he worked at Rolls-Royce as an aeroengineer before migrating to Australia where he worked as a toolmaker and union organiser.

On 21 July 1953 he married Jean Henshall and together had two sons and a daughter.

== Public career ==
Leese won the new electorate of Pine Rivers at the 1972 Queensland state election, defeating the Country Party, Liberal Party, and DLP candidates. He held the seat until the next state election in 1974 when he lost the seat to Rob Akers of the Liberal Party. He contested Pine Rivers again in 1977 but was once again defeated by Akers. From 1979 until 1985 he was an alderman on the Brisbane City Council for the ward of Bramble Bay.

Parliament of Queensland
New seat	Member for Pine Rivers; 1972–1974	Succeeded by Rob Akers
