= Rob Akers =

Australian politician and architect

Member of the Queensland Legislative Assembly for Pine Rivers
- In office 7 December 1974 – 22 October 1983
- Preceded by: Kenneth Leese
- Succeeded by: Yvonne Chapman

Personal details
- Born: Robert George Akers; 17 October 1941 Brisbane, Queensland, Australia
- Died: 28 October 2006 (aged 65) Brisbane, Queensland, Australia
- Party: Liberal Party
- Spouse(s): Ilse Frances Gaylard (m. 1965–19??); Rosemary Annette Kyburz (née Plim) (m. 1981–present); 2 sons
- Education: University of Queensland
- Occupation: Architect

Robert George Akers (17 October 1941 – 28 October 2006) was an architect and Liberal Party Member of the Legislative Assembly of Queensland, for the seat of Pine Rivers 1974–1983. Later he was Chairman of Shire of Pine Rivers from 1985 to 1994. In 1995, he stood for the State seat of Kurwongbah as an independent.

Akers was the second son of Pine Rivers Councillor James Henry Akers (1913–1977) and M. B. S. (Molly) Akers OAM (died 1999). He attended Brisbane Grammar School.

== Marriages ==
Akers married (the second marriage for both) fellow parliamentarian Rosemary Kyburz while in parliament, the first time sitting members had married each other. They have two sons.

He and his wife both lost their seats in the 1983 Liberal Party electoral collapse after Sir Joh Bjelke-Petersen characterised many of the Liberal Party members of his Coalition government as "ratbags". These events led to the end of the National-Liberal Coalition in Queensland (at State level).

== Later career ==
Akers entered the 1994 Mayoral election as sitting Shire Chairman against Yvonne Chapman and 4 others. In addition to being the first time the Shire elected a Mayor, it was also the first time a preferential ballot was used. Cr Akers received the majority of the first preferences but Ms Chapman was victorious after the distribution of preferences. This was the second time Ms Chapman had defeated Rob Akers at significant election, having taken the Queensland Parliamentary seat of Pine Rivers from him in 1983.

== Awards and recognition ==
- Akers was honoured by Pine Rivers Shire naming the Rob Akers Reserve, a substantial sports ground and parklands after him.
- Akers was a recipient of the Centenary Medal in 2001 for "distinguished service to the community through parliament, local government and the Lions Club".

Parliament of Queensland
Preceded by Kenneth Leese	Member for Pine Rivers; 1974–1983	Succeeded by Yvonne Chapman
