= Margaret Woodgate =

Australian politician

Member of the Queensland Legislative Assembly for Pine Rivers
- In office 2 December 1989 – 19 September 1992
- Preceded by: Yvonne Chapman
- Succeeded by: Seat abolished

Member of the Queensland Legislative Assembly for Kurwongbah
- In office 19 September 1992 – 17 March 1997
- Preceded by: New seat
- Succeeded by: Linda Lavarch

Personal details
- Born: Margaret Rosemary Woodgate; 1 September 1935 (age 90) Brisbane, Queensland, Australia
- Party: Labor
- Occupation: Electorate secretary

Margaret Rosemary Woodgate (born 1 September 1935) is a former Australian politician.

Woodgate was born in Brisbane. A member of the Labor Party, she served on Pine Rivers Shire Council from 1985 to 1988 and was a delegate to the Queensland Local Government Conference during that time. In 1989 she was elected to the Queensland Legislative Assembly as the member for Pine Rivers, moving to Kurwongbah in 1992. She was Temporary Chairman of Committees from 1990 to 1991 and in 1995 was appointed Minister for Family and Community Services. Following the Labor Government's resignation after losing its one-seat majority in 1996 she became Shadow Minister for Families, Community Care and Aboriginal and Islander Affairs, but she resigned from the ministry in 1996 and from parliament in 1997, triggering a by-election.

Parliament of Queensland
Preceded by Yvonne Chapman	Member for Pine Rivers; 1989–1992	Abolished
New seat	Member for Kurwongbah; 1992–1997	Succeeded by Linda Lavarch
