= Bunya, Queensland =

Bunya
- Suburb
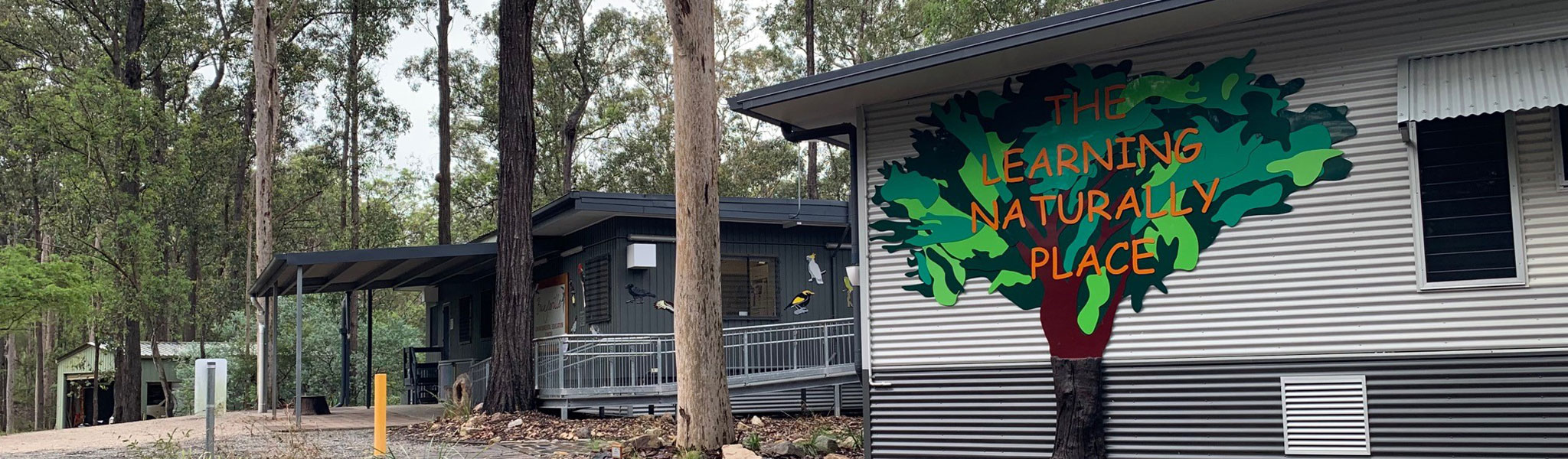
- Bunyaville Environmental Education Centre

- Interactive map of Bunya
- Coordinates: 27.3652°S 152.9452°E
- Country: Australia
- State: Queensland
- LGA: City of Moreton Bay
- Location: 16.3 km (10.1 mi) SW of Strathpine; 18.9 km (11.7 mi) NW of Brisbane CBD

Government
  - State electorate: Ferny Grove
  - Federal division: Dickson

Area
  - Total: 14.5 km^{2} (5.6 sq mi)

Population
  - Total: 1,968 (2021 census)
  - Density: 135.7/km^{2} (351.5/sq mi)
- Time zone: UTC+10:00 (AEST)
- Postcode: 4055
Suburbs around Bunya
| Eatons Hill | Eatons Hill | Albany Creek |
| Draper | Bunya | McDowall |
| Ferny Hills | Arana Hills | Everton Hills |

Bunya is a suburb in the City of Moreton Bay, Queensland, Australia. In the 2021 census, Bunya had a population of 1,968 people.

== Geography ==
Bunya is north-west of Brisbane, the capital city of Queensland.

The suburb is bounded to the north by the South Pine River.

Bunya Crossing is a ford across the South Pine River in the south of the locality (27.3529°S 152.9481°E). It is at the northern end of Dugandan Road and does not have a bridge.

Bunya is home to the Bunyaville Conservation Park, operated by the Queensland Parks and Wildlife Service. Spotted gum, grey ironbark, narrow-leaved ironbark, white mahogany, tallowwood, forest red gum, grey gum and brush box grow in the open forests. The forest protects a small community of the broad-leaved spotted gum Corymbia henryi found only in the Brisbane region.

== History ==
The name Bunya is derived from the Kabi language word bonyi or bunyi, meaning the bunya pine tree (Araucaria bidwillii).

Bunya State School opened on 25 January 1875 and closed on 21 February 1965. The school was at 550 Bunya Road (27.3660°S 152.9311°E).

== Demographics ==
In the 2011 census, Bunya recorded a population of 1,787 people, 49.7% female and 50.3% male. The median age of the Bunya population was 41 years, 4 years above the national median of 37. 81.6% of people living in Bunya were born in Australia. The other top responses for country of birth were England 5.7%, New Zealand 2%, South Africa 1.3%, Canada 0.6%, Papua New Guinea 0.4%. 93.9% of people spoke only English at home; the next most common languages were 0.8% German, 0.3% French, 0.3% Cantonese, 0.2% Polish, 0.2% Auslan.

In the 2016 census, Bunya had a population of 1,916 people.

In the 2021 census, Bunya had a population of 1,968 people.

== Education ==
Bunyaville Environmental Education Centre is an Outdoor and Environmental Education Centre at Old Northern Road (27.3740°S 152.9695°E).

There are no mainstream schools in Bunya. The nearest government primary schools are Patrick Road State School in Ferny Hills to the south and Samford State School in Samford Village to the south-west. The nearest government secondary school is Ferny Grove State High School in Ferny Grove to the south.

== Facilities ==
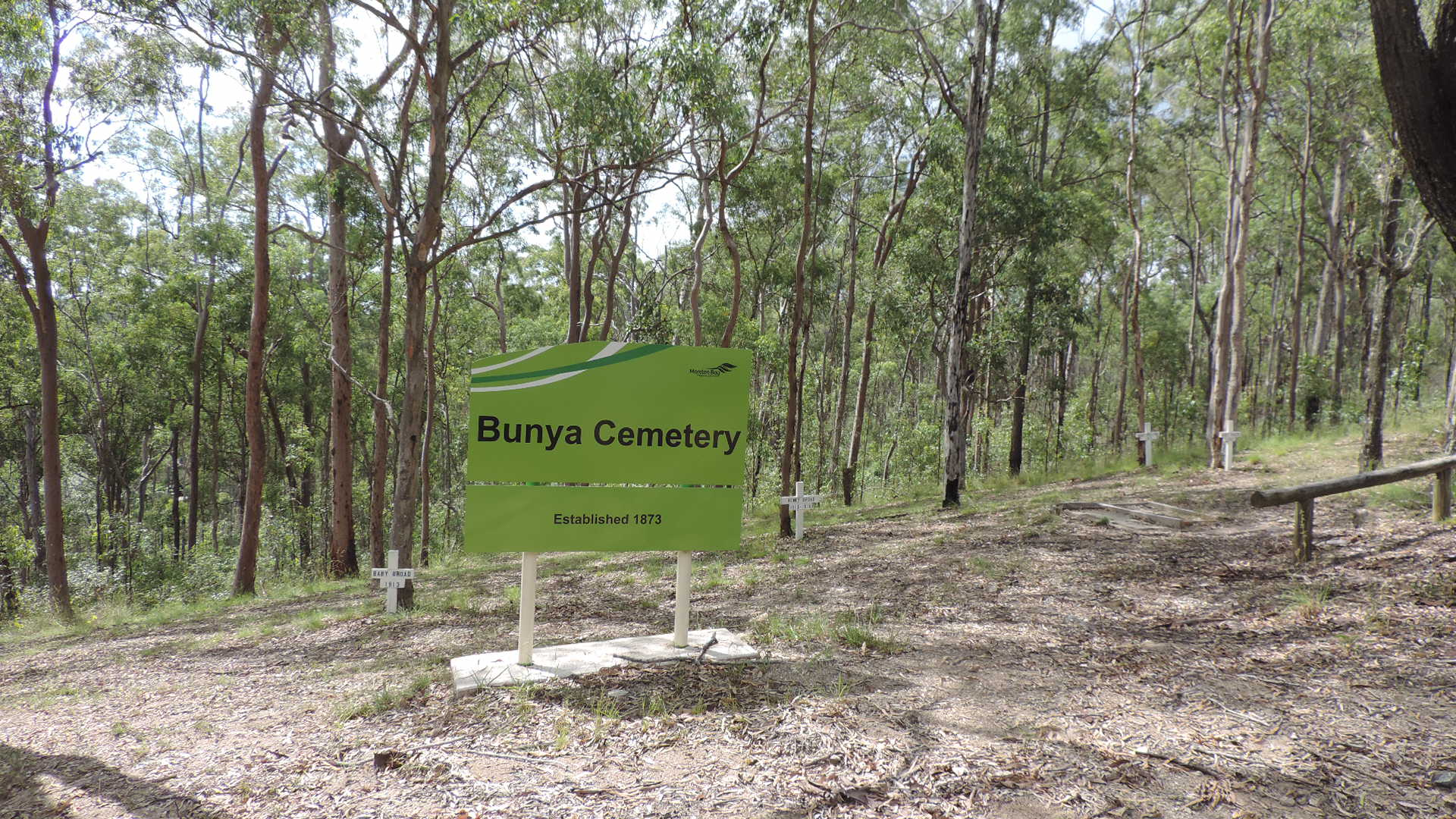
Bunya Cemetery, 2015

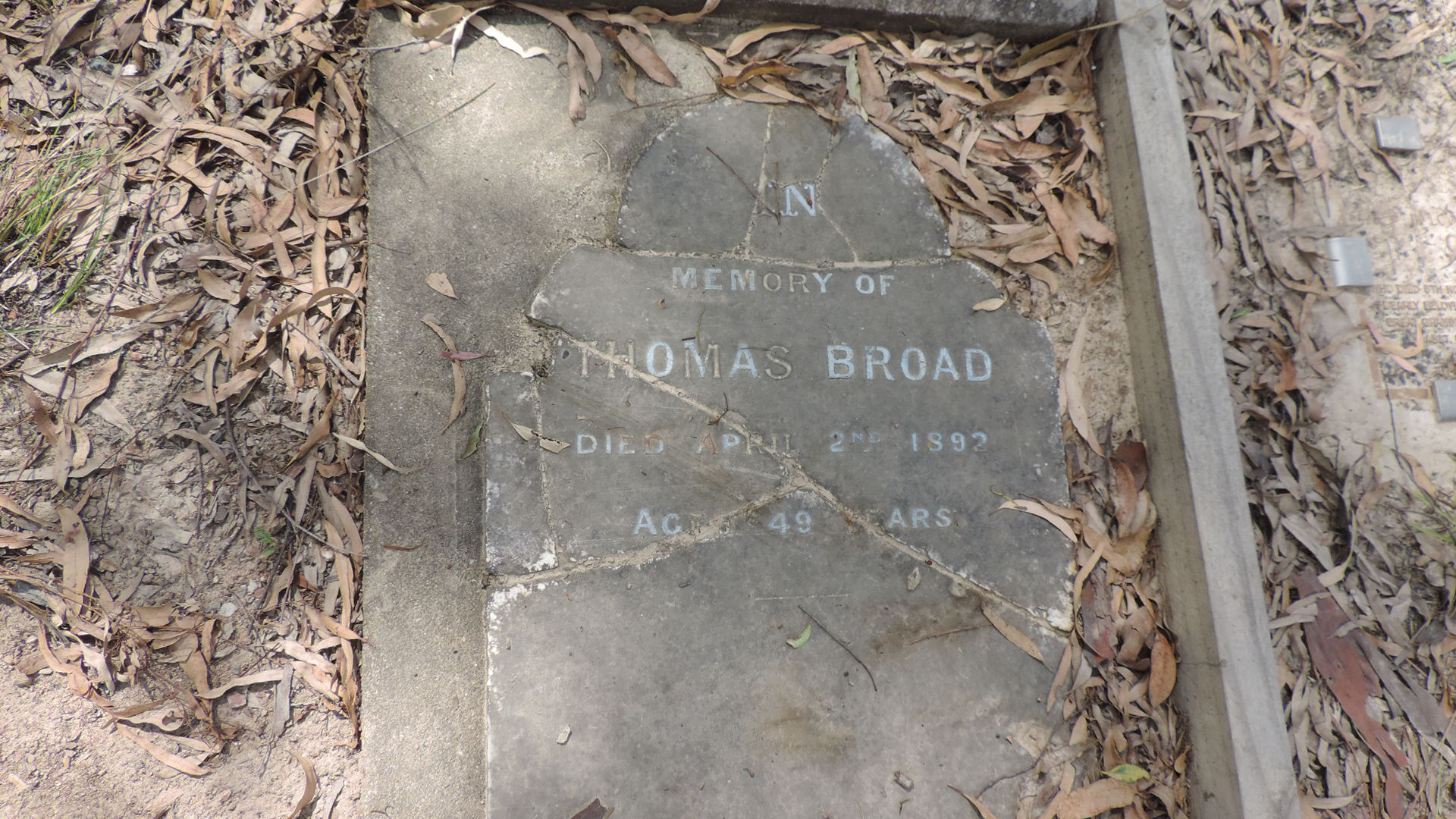
Only surviving headstone, Bunya cemetery, 2015 - "Thomas Broad, died Apr 2nd 1892 aged 49 years"

Bunya Cemetery is at 660 Bunya Road (27.3598°S 152.9275°E). It is a closed cemetery with only one surviving headstone from 1892.

Arana Hills SES Facility is in James Drysdale Recreation Reserve at 2 Pine Hills Drive (27.3797°S 152.9479°E).

== Amenities ==
There are a number of parks in the area:

- Bunya Crossing (27.3561°S 152.9494°E)
- George Biggs Playground (27.3520°S 152.9430°E)
- Hill View Park (27.3758°S 152.9269°E)
- James Drysdale Recreation Reserve (27.3784°S 152.9471°E)
- Surrey Farm Park (27.3733°S 152.9263°E)
- Ted Corbould Reserve (27.3770°S 152.9346°E)

James Drysdale Recreation Reserve hosts several sports clubs including: Pine Hills Pythons football club, who play in Capital League 1 and Pine Hills Netball Club who play in the Downey Park winter season.

== See also ==
- Brisbane native plants
