= Linda Lavarch =

Australian politician (born 1958)

Attorney-General of Queensland Minister for Justice
- In office 28 July 2005 – 18 October 2006
- Premier: Peter Beattie
- Preceded by: Rod Welford
- Succeeded by: Kerry Shine

Member of the Queensland Parliament for Kurwongbah
- In office 24 May 1997 – 20 March 2009
- Preceded by: Margaret Woodgate
- Succeeded by: Seat abolished

Personal details
- Born: 27 November 1958 (age 67) Brisbane, Queensland, Australia
- Party: Labor
- Spouse: Michael Lavarch
- Children: 2
- Education: Queensland University of Technology
- Profession: Solicitor

Linda Denise Lavarch (born 27 November 1958) is an Australian politician and solicitor. She was a Labor Party member of the Legislative Assembly of Queensland from 1997 to 2009, representing the district of Kurwongbah.

== Political career ==
Lavarch was first elected to the seat of Kurwongbah, situated in Brisbane's northern suburbs, in a by-election on 24 May 1997. On 28 July 2005, Lavarch was appointed Queensland's Attorney-General and Minister for Justice—the first woman to hold a substantive role as Attorney-General in Queensland (Joan Sheldon had held the role in an interim capacity for seven days in 1996). Prior to being appointed Attorney-General, she held the position of parliamentary secretary to the Minister for Energy and Aboriginal and Minister for Torres Strait Islander Policy, John Mickel.

Lavarch pursued an active reform agenda as Attorney-General particularly focusing on community justice initiatives and the treatment of vulnerable people in the criminal justice system. She retired at the 2009 state election.

On 27 April 2016, Lavarch was announced as the Labor candidate for the federal seat of Dickson at the 2016 election, eventually losing to Immigration Minister, Peter Dutton. Her former husband, Michael, previously represented Dickson from 1993 to 1996.

Lavarch sought ALP preselection to run in Dickson again in the 2019 election but was defeated by Ali France, the daughter of her former parliamentary colleague Peter Lawlor.

== Post politics ==
Lavarch currently chairs the Australian government's Not-For-Profit Sector Reform Council which provides advice to government on not-for-profit sector issues.

Lavarch was chair of the board for Screen Queensland from 2018 to 2022.

== Personal life ==
She was formerly married to Michael Lavarch, who had served as an Attorney-General at the federal level from 1993 to 1996.

Parliament of Queensland
Preceded by Margaret Woodgate	Member for Kurwongbah; 1997–2009	Abolished
Political offices
Preceded by Rod Welford	Attorney-General of Queensland; Minister for Justice; 2005–2006	Succeeded by Kerry Shine
