= Selector's Hut, Camp Mountain =

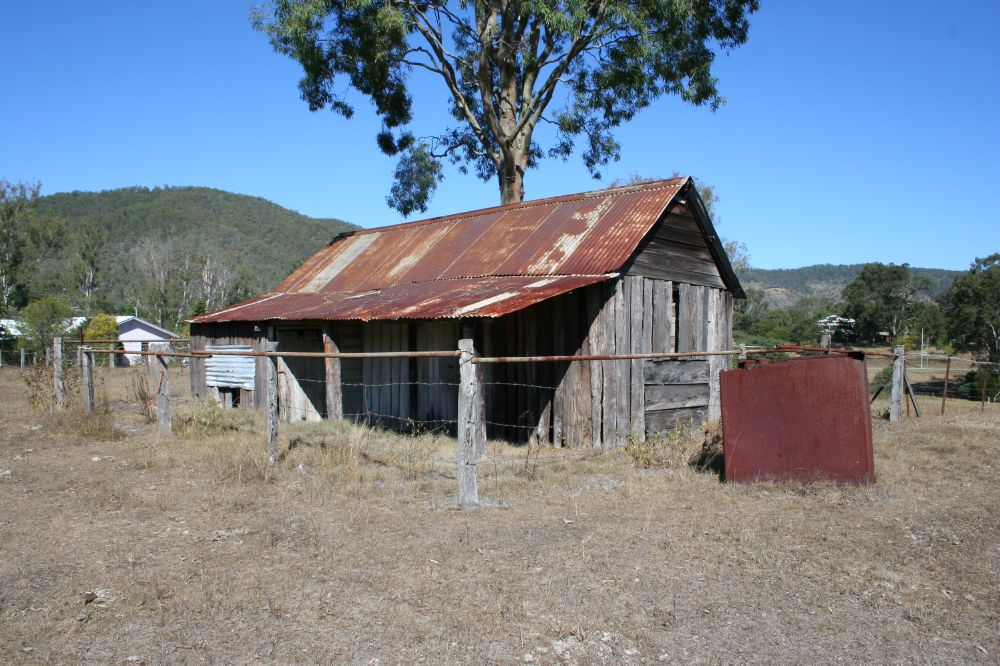
- Selector's Hut, 2009

- Location within Queensland Location within Australia
- 27.3923°S 152.8743°E
- Location: 20 Upper Camp Mountain Road, Camp Mountain, City of Moreton Bay, Queensland, Australia

History
- Built: c. 1870

Queensland Heritage Register
- Official name: Selector's Hut (former), Marks' Hut
- Type: state heritage (built)
- Designated: 3 December 2007
- Reference no.: 602654
- Significant period: 1870s
- Builders: George Atthow

The Selector's Hut is a heritage-listed hut at 20 Upper Camp Mountain Road, Camp Mountain, City of Moreton Bay, Queensland, Australia. It is also known as Marks' Hut. It was built c. 1870 by George Atthow. It was added to the Queensland Heritage Register on 3 December 2007.

== History ==
The Selector's Hut, Camp Mountain, is a small single roomed cottage located in a rural setting near the township of Samford north of Brisbane. It is constructed of slab and sawn timber and was built c. 1870 by selector George Atthow.

Land settlement in rural Queensland began with a pastoral phase where squatters occupied large tracts of Crown land on which they ran sheep or cattle. Over time, the Crown surveyed these runs and enforced lease arrangements with the squatters. Closer settlement of rural land began in the 1860s, when the government enacted legislation to encourage small scale farming. Crown land began to be made available in small allotments for selection. The 1868 Crown Lands Alienation Act, enabled government to resume substantial portions of leasehold runs for this purpose.

Like most areas close to Brisbane, the Samford valley experienced a fairly short pastoral phase. The earliest known pastoralist to occupy the valley was Archibald Young. Young had probably already occupied the area when he applied to lease land in 1854. His lease became known as the Samford Run. Closer settlement commenced from March 1865 with the first sale of 49 farm allotments excised from the Samford Run. Initially, the farm allotments sold very slowly but the process accelerated after the passing of the 1868 Act. By 1871, there were about 71 people living in the area. The farmers grew small crops and operated dairies. A provisional school opened in 1872.

Grazier and entrepreneur, George Atthow (1828–1891), selected portions 42 to 45 in the Parish of Samford on 17 April 1869. It is likely that he built the extant cottage and some nearby cattle yards soon after. An alternative view has been put that the hut was built by surveyors. If this is true, the hut would have been built prior to selection of the land by Atthow. However, this is considered unlikely for two reasons: first, it is unlikely that surveyors would have built accommodation as substantial as the cottage and second, a Commissioner of Crown Lands report dated 1873 notes that the dwelling on the property was completed by the selector. Atthow grazed cattle on the property and on other land he later selected in the Samford and Albany Creek areas. A bailiff was living on the Samford block from January 1870. By 1875, Atthow himself was living there.

The cottage is typical of the relatively primitive dwellings built by selectors when they first occupied their land. Built largely of undressed timber slabs, it initially comprised two rooms and a front verandah. An 1875 Bailiff of Crown Lands report noted that it had a shingle roof. By 1887, a further two small rooms had been added under the verandah and, if the roof had originally been clad with shingles, these had been replaced by corrugated iron. It is possible that one of the new rooms was used as a consulting room by Dr Keighly Marks who occupied the cottage from 1887 to c. 1894 and practised medicine from there. It is believed that a pit close to the cottage may have been used for storing cream, milk and other perishables it may also have been used as a dump. The Duranta and Oleander located near the cottage may be relics of a 19th-century garden.

A number of changes have occurred to the cottage since this time. The cottage has lost one of the rooms under the verandah, internal walls, the rear skillion kitchen and chimney, and the living room chimney. The traces of Bulletin pages on the wall probably date from the interwar period. Stone flagging to one side of the hut supported a tank (no longer extant) that was installed during the same period. The remaining front verandah room was originally clad with horizontal boards. These were replaced by slabs during repairs carried out in 1976. At this time, slabs taken from old horse stalls and a collapsed hut located elsewhere in the area were used on repairs to the main part of the cottage. The slabs from the hut are broader that those from the horse stalls. A ship's tank near the cottage was placed there in 1979.

The original cattle yards (no longer extant) were noted in the 1873 survey report. A sketch map included with an 1875 report by the Crown Lands Bailiff indicates that they were north of the hut and further from the boundary than the existing yards. It is believed that the existing yards, just northwest of the hut, were built by the Marks family in the 1950s.

From 1877, the property was owned for short periods of time by various owners until 1887 when it was purchased by Charles Ferdinand Marks and it remained in Marks family ownership for well over a century becoming the nucleus of their "Cushleva" farm. Dr Keighly Marks lived in the cottage until c. 1894. From this time it was let by the Marks family to various tenants until about 1945. The property was still in Marks family ownership at the death of Pat Marks in 2002.

The Marks family were prominent in Brisbane's medical and scientific communities. Charles Marks was a medical practitioner and politician, based at Wickham Terrace. He was a member of the Central Board of Health and the Queensland Medical Board. He was president of the latter organisation between 1910 and 1912. His son, Edward Oswald (Ted) Marks, was a geologist and ophthalmologist. Another son, Alexander Hammett Marks, was a distinguished medical practitioner and soldier. Ted Marks' daughter, Pat Marks, was one of Australia's leading entomologists and malaria experts. Pat Marks took a close interest in the cottage. In recent years, the area around the cottage has experienced another phase of settlement as the Samford Valley has developed into a rural residential area.

Pat Marks' will directed that the Marks property (including the selector's hut) should be used for "ecological purposes". Accordingly, the property was transferred to the Queensland University of Technology for the establishment of the Samford Ecological Research Facility to be used for teaching and research in environmental studies with particular emphasis on the impact of urban development on ecosystems.

== Description ==
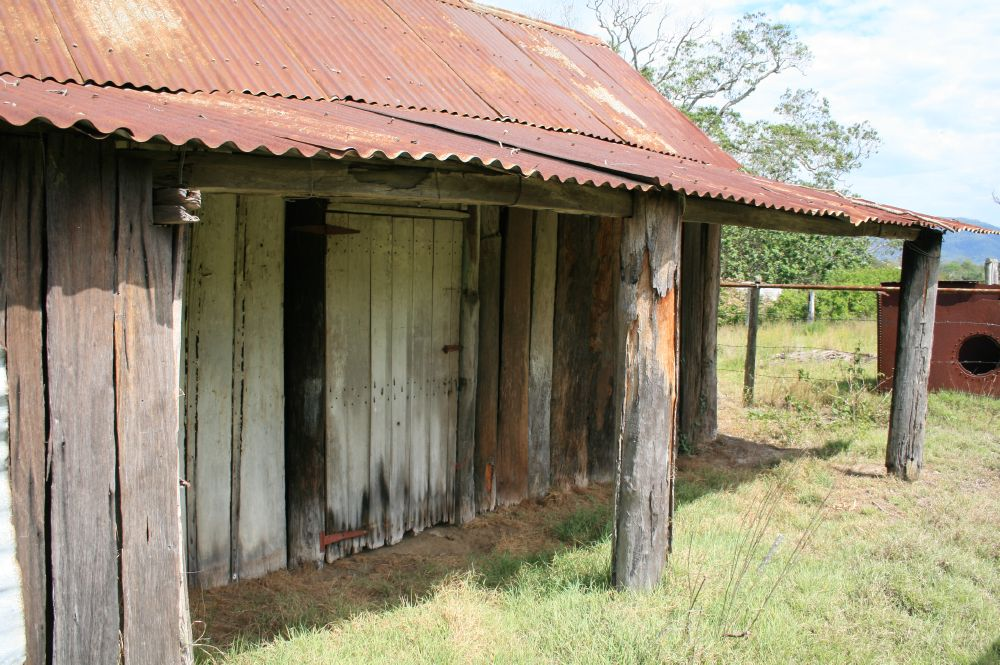
Selector's Hut, 2007

The former selector's hut at Camp Mountain is located on the west side of Upper Camp Mountain Road approximately one kilometre southwest from the intersection with Camp Mountain Road. It stands on a gentle ridge in an open grassed paddock to the west side of the road. The hut has expansive views to hills beyond particularly the D'Aguilar Range which acts as a picturesque backdrop when viewing the hut from easterly points.

A single room with a projecting alcove to the northeast corner, the hut is sheltered by a rectangular gable roof and has a skillion roofed verandah to the northeast. The hut is clad with vertical and horizontal hardwood slabs and partly lined with horizontal timber boards. Grass and soil obscure the perimeter of the hut but the vertical slabs appear to stand directly into the ground and attach to the perimeter roof beams. Some timber elements have markings and notches that may indicate a recycling of timber from elsewhere. The roofs are clad with corrugated iron sheeting.

The short end elevations are clad with vertical hardwood slabs and the gables are infilled with horizontal timber boards. On the northwest elevation, a gap left by an earlier brick chimney is concealed by wide vertical and horizontal slabs. At the opposite end of the hut, a corrugated iron sheet covers a rectangular window opening.

The long elevation to the rear (southwest) accommodates a rectangular opening cut into the slabs midway along the elevation. A hinged timber framed and boarded window is fitted to this opening.

The front of the alcove is clad with vertical timber slabs and a gap in the wall is patched with a sheet of corrugated iron. The northeast corner is strapped with wire. The wall to the verandah is clad with chamferboards and a timber framed and boarded door opens onto the verandah. The verandah roof is supported by round timber posts and the verandah has a grassed/dirt floor. The verandah elevation of the hut is clad with vertical hardwood slabs and a hinged timber door opens into the hut.

A large area of the interior of the hut is lined with horizontal timber boards which have remnants of newspaper adhering to them. The roof is unlined. The roof framing includes slender log beams and sawn timber members. The dirt floor has loose timber boards laid to the southeast end.

The immediate surrounds of the hut are secured by a fence constructed of timber posts threaded through with barbed wire with narrow metal pipe top rails.

There is stone flagging to the southeast side of the hut.

A tall eucalypt stands to the southwest of the hut and there are scattered clusters of trees and shrubs in the surrounding grassed paddock.

Timber stockyards stand to the northwest of the hut and a hollow in the slope to the north of the yards accommodates an earlier storage area.

== Heritage listing ==
The Selector's Hut was listed on the Queensland Heritage Register on 3 December 2007 having satisfied the following criteria.

The place is important in demonstrating the evolution or pattern of Queensland's history.

The Selector's Hut, Camp Mountain, built in c. 1870 or earlier, illustrates an important phase of settlement that was occurring throughout the colony of Queensland at the time. From the 1860s, Crown land began to be divided into allotments and made available for selection in line with a government policy to encourage the growth of small scale farming. The Camp Mountain hut was built by a selector during the early stages of this process in the Samford Valley.

The storage pit and stockyards are important evidence of farming activities associated with the changing uses of the hut, the property and land use in the Samford since 1870.

The place demonstrates rare, uncommon or endangered aspects of Queensland's cultural heritage.

The hut is a rare example of a 19th-century selector's dwelling and a good example of a slab hut. It is uncommon in southeast Queensland for its earliness. Its austerity, modest scale and construction techniques are important in demonstrating a way of life and a building type once common but now rare.

The place is important in demonstrating the principal characteristics of a particular class of cultural places.

The hut is important in demonstrating the principal characteristics of a selector's timber slab dwelling of the 19th century. The design and construction techniques reflect the limited resources available when constructing a dwelling on a selected block during the initial stages of closer settlement. The hut is small in scale and simple in design. Timber elements are set directly into the ground and the hut is mostly clad with hardwood timber slabs.

The place is important because of its aesthetic significance.

Sited on a gentle ridge, surrounded by lightly wooded pasture with the backdrop of rolling hills including the D'Aguilar Range, the humble slab hut in its picturesque setting evokes the sensibilities of a rustic idyll. Modern elements are minimised in many of the important view lines, and this is effective in conveying a sense of the early form and setting of the hut.
