= Camp Mountain, Queensland =

Camp Mountain
- Suburb
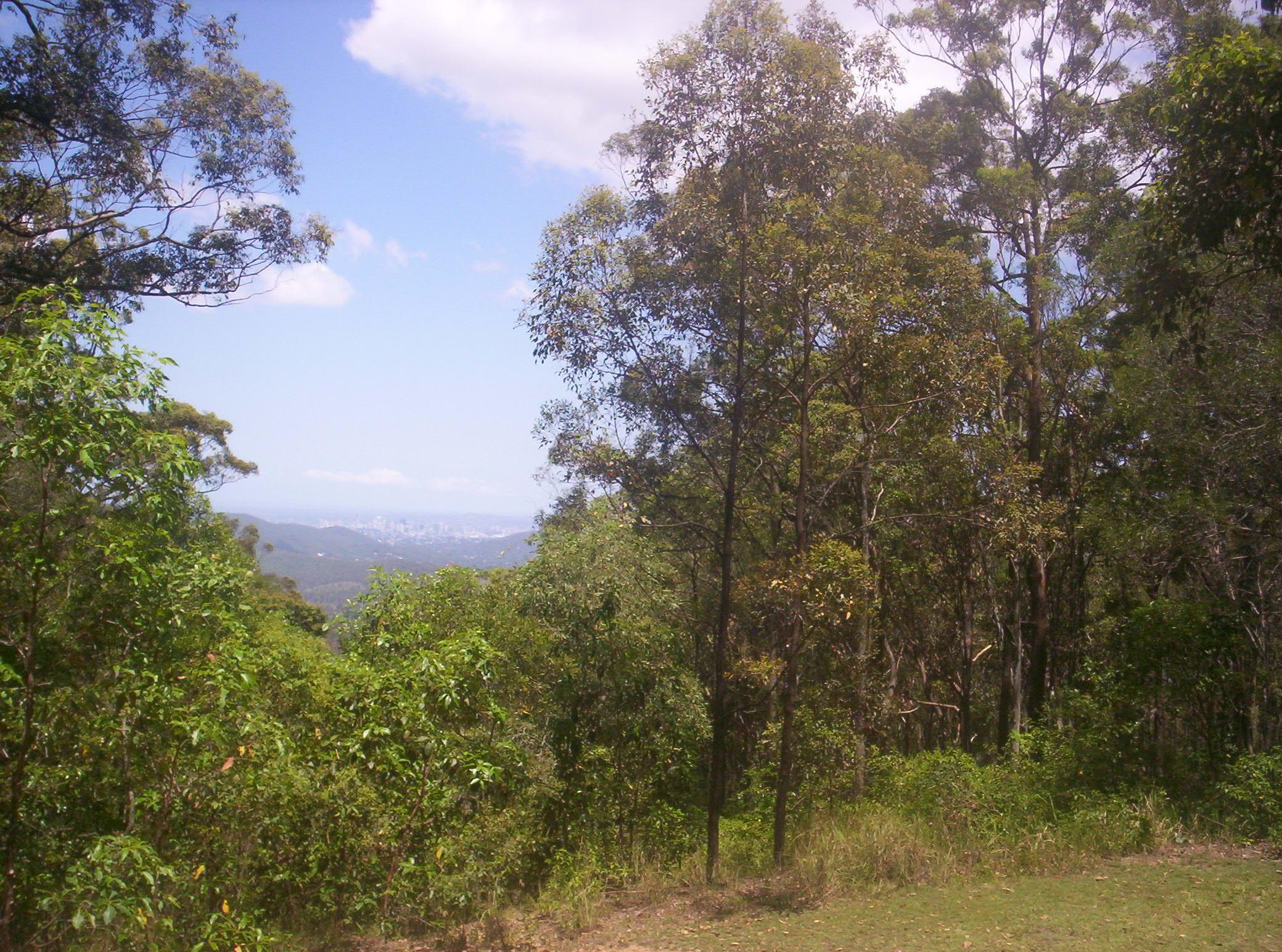
- View of Brisbane city from Camp Mountain

- Interactive map of Camp Mountain
- Coordinates: 27.3977°S 152.8755°E
- Country: Australia
- State: Queensland
- LGA: City of Moreton Bay
- Location: 3.5 km (2.2 mi) SW of Samford Village; 22.2 km (13.8 mi) SW of Strathpine; 23.2 km (14.4 mi) NW of Brisbane CBD

Government
  - State electorate: Pine Rivers
  - Federal division: Dickson

Area
  - Total: 16.2 km^{2} (6.3 sq mi)

Population
  - Total: 1,447 (2021 census)
  - Density: 89.32/km^{2} (231.3/sq mi)
- Time zone: UTC+10:00 (AEST)
- Postcode: 4520
Suburbs around Camp Mountain
Samford Valley	Samford Village	Samford Valley
Wights Mountain	Camp Mountain	Ferny Hills
Jollys Lookout	Enoggera Reservoir	Upper Kedron

Camp Mountain is a rural locality in the City of Moreton Bay, Queensland, Australia. In the 2021 census, Camp Mountain had a population of 1,447 people.

== Geography ==
Camp Mountain is near Samford, 20 kilometres (12 mi) north-west of the Brisbane central business district.

The south-east of the locality is within D'Aguilar National Park and a lookout and recreation area are accessible off Mount Nebo Road.

The locality takes its name from the mountain Camp Mountain (27.4118°S 152.8772°E) which rises 414 metres (1,358 ft) above sea level.

== History ==
There was gold mining in the area in the 1860s. The miners referred to the area as their "mountain camp" and that is the origin of the name of the mountain and the locality. In the late 1800s the mountain was known as Mount Daniel.

By 1908, banana growing in the Samford district had become one of the area's most important industries, and in 1926 and 1927, more bananas were sent from Samford railway station, just down from Camp Mountain, to Sydney and Melbourne than any other station in Queensland. This successful industry existed until the banana bunchy top virus wiped out the crops in the early 1930s. Dairy farming and timber were other industries in the district and out to the end of the line at Dayboro, as well as the quarrying of granite at Camp Mountain, used in the foundations of Brisbane City Hall.

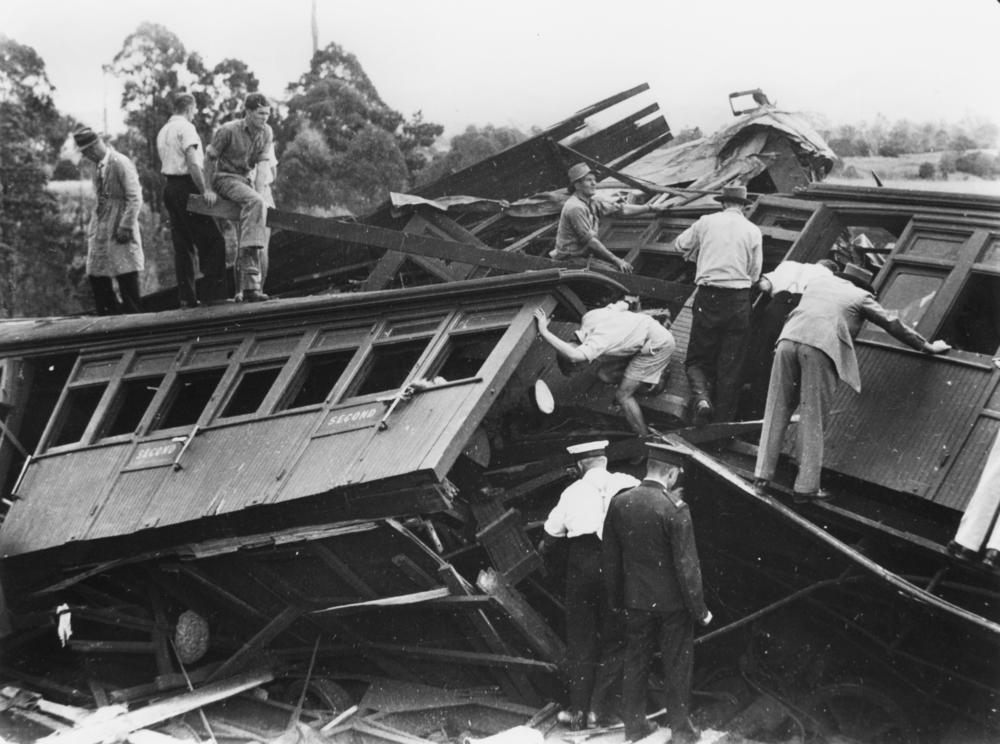
Rescuers inspect the wreckage of the Camp Mountain train disaster.

Camp Mountain railway station (27.3947°S 152.8919°E) opened in 1918, and until 1955 the train line to Dayboro traversed the area.

Camp Mountain State School opened circa 1929 and closed circa 1955. It was on Upper Camp Mountain Road (approx 27.4014°S 152.8643°E).

On 5 May 1947, the Camp Mountain rail accident occurred at approximately 9:48 am when a crowded picnic train derailed on a sharp left-hand curve between Ferny Grove and Camp Mountain stations (27.39713°S 152.89577°E). With 16 fatalities and 38 injured, the accident was (and remains) the largest loss of life in a rail accident on the Queensland railway network.

== Demographics ==
In the 2011 census, Camp Mountain recorded a population of 1,258 people, 51% female and 49% male. The median age of the Camp Mountain population was 41 years, 4 years above the national median of 37. 81.7% of people living in Camp Mountain were born in Australia. The other top responses for country of birth were England 6.4%, New Zealand 1.8%, Netherlands 1%, Italy 0.9%, South Africa 0.6%. 92.1% of people spoke only English at home; the next most common languages were 1% German, 0.6% Dutch, 0.6% Cantonese, 0.6% Italian, 0.3% Hungarian.

In the 2016 census Camp Mountain had a population of 1,416 people.

In the 2021 census, Camp Mountain had a population of 1,447 people.

== Heritage listings ==
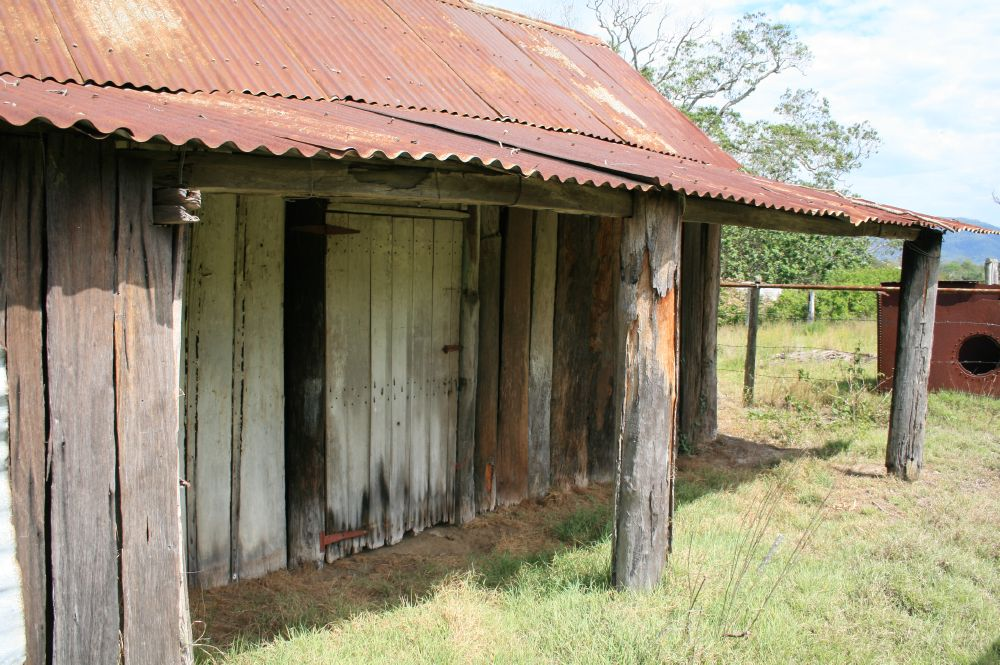
Selector's Hut, 2007

Camp Mountain has a number of heritage-listed sites, including:

- 20 Upper Camp Mountain Road (27.3923°S 152.8743°E): Selector's Hut

== Education ==
There are no schools is Camp Mountain. The nearest government primary schools are Samford State School in neighbouring Samford Village to the north, Patricks Road State School in neighbouring Ferny Hills to the east, and Ferny Grove State School in Ferny Grove to the east. The nearest government secondary school is Ferny Grove State High School in Ferny Grove to the east.

The Samford Ecological Research Facility is a 51-hectare (130-acre) parcel of land bequeathed by Elizabeth Nesta Marks to the Queensland University of Technology as a teaching and research facility for biodiversity and conservation, urban development, and agriculture. It is at 148 Camp Mountain Road (27.3880°S 152.8784°E).

== Amenities ==
There are a number of parks in the locality, including:

- Mcafee Park (27.3921°S 152.8788°E)
- Mitchell Park (27.4099°S 152.8657°E)
- Orr Park (27.3935°S 152.8929°E)
- Peterson Park (27.3926°S 152.8901°E)

== Attractions ==
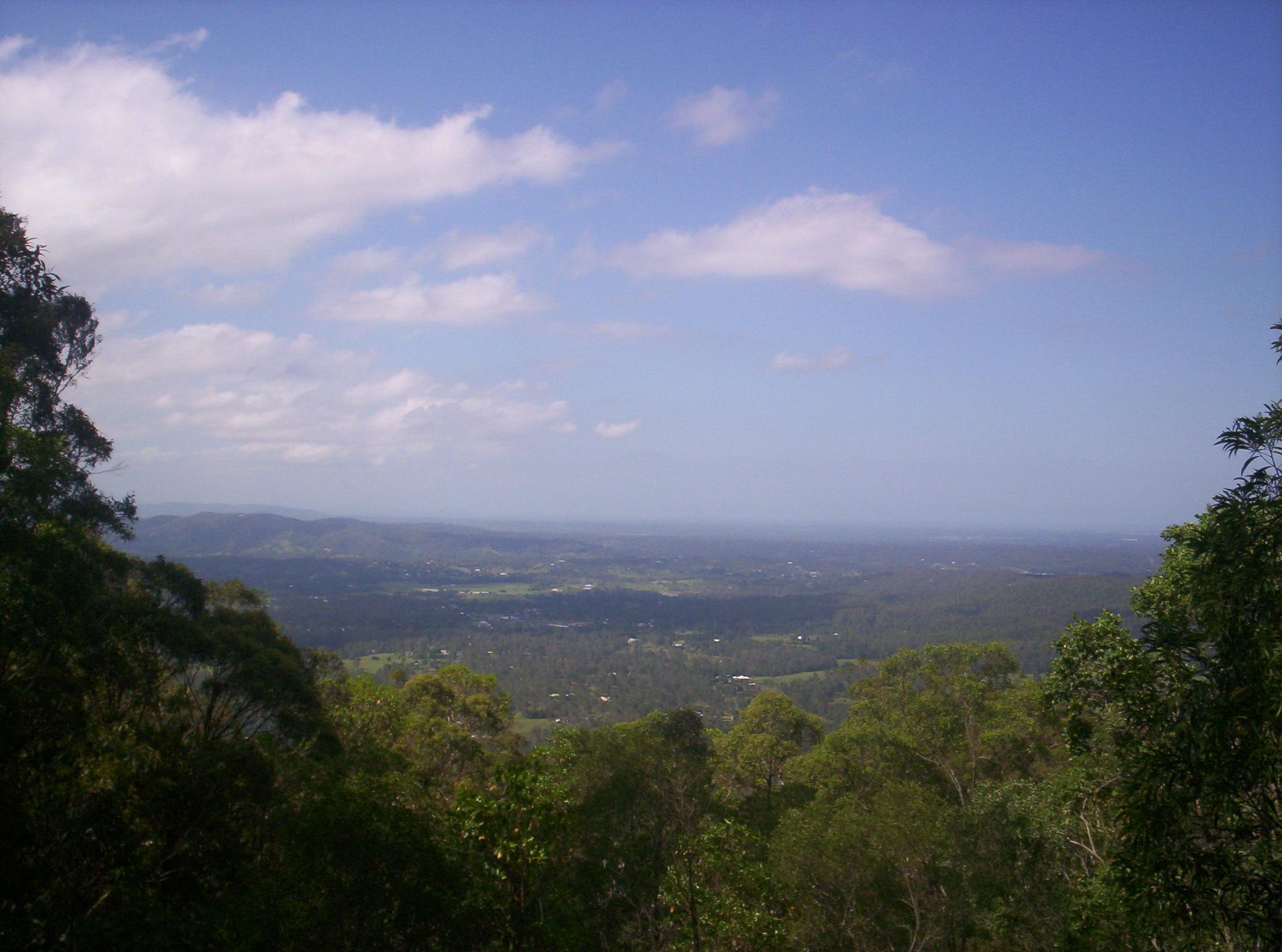
Camp Mountain — looking towards the Glass House Mountains

Camp Mountain Lookout is at the end of Camp Mountain Road within the D'Aguilar National Park (27.4102°S 152.8790°E). Part of the historic Enoggera goldfields, the lookout provides views of Moreton Bay, the Brisbane skyline and the Glass House Mountains.
