= Camp Mountain railway station =

Railway station in Queensland, Australia

Camp Mountain

General information
- Location: Camp Mountain, Queensland; Australia
- Coordinates: 27.3947°S 152.8919°E

History
- Opened: 29 June 1918

Services
Preceding station	Queensland Rail	Following station
Former service
Ferny Grove towards Roma Street	Dayboro line	Samford towards Dayboro
Location

Camp Mountain railway station is a railway station in Camp Mountain, Queensland, Australia. The station opened in 1918 as part of the extension to Samford.
