= Aedes britteni =

Scientific classification
- Kingdom: Animalia
- Phylum: Arthropoda
- Class: Insecta
- Order: Diptera
- Family: Culicidae
- Genus: Aedes
- Species: A. britteni

Binomial name
- Aedes britteni Marks and Hodgkin, 1958

Species of mosquito

Aedes (Finlaya) britteni is a species of mosquito in the genus Aedes found in Northern Western Australia and the Northern Territory. It breeds in tree holes, the type series were bred from a rot-hole in a Baobab tree. Little is known of the adult biology, and it is not known to bite humans.

A. britteni is named after E. J. Britten, of the Department of Public Health, Western Australia.

== Description ==
A. britteni has a reddish brown integument on its head, and silver scales creating an eye border. Adult females have a wing span of 3.6-4.7 mm, males 2.9-3.2 mm.
