= Culiseta arenivaga =

Scientific classification
- Kingdom: Animalia
- Phylum: Arthropoda
- Clade: Pancrustacea
- Class: Insecta
- Order: Diptera
- Family: Culicidae
- Genus: Culiseta
- Species: C. arenivaga

Binomial name
- Culiseta arenivaga (Marks, 1968)

Species of mosquito

Culiseta arenivaga is a species of mosquito in the family Culicidae found on Fraser Island, Queensland, Australia, in the Australasian biogeographic realm. The holotype and paratype specimens were collected in 1967 by Dr. Elizabeth N. Marks who described the new species the following year.

== Description ==
The head is generally light brown, darker behind the eyes, with narrow curved pale golden scales mesially, and flat pale scales laterally. The antennae are reddish brown at the base and dark distally. The palps and proboscis have black scales. The thorax is a bright light reddish brown, with bare submedian stripes on the scutum and scattered fine black narrow curved scales and bristles on either side. The scutellum is sparsely scaled, and the postnotum is light brown. The abdomen is generally dark-scaled with purplish reflections, with a pale sternite.

The wings are dark-scaled with long, narrow plume scales, the halteres are pale with a dark-scaled knob, and the legs are generally dark-scaled . The proboscis is approximately 1.5 times the length of the femur of the first pair of legs, the antennae are shorter than the proboscis, and the palp is one-sixth the length of the proboscis including the labella .

== Bionomics ==
The type specimens, all females, were collected during overcast and showery conditions in a forest of hoop pine (Araucaria cunninghamil) planted in carrol (Backhousia myrtifolia) scrub and in close proximity to a fresh water creek fringed by rainforest. They showed no sign of engorgement with blood but whether they attempted to bite is not known.

== Etymology ==
C. arenivaga is named from the Latin words describing its habitat, arenosus meaning "sandy" and vagus meaning "wanderer", thus "a wanderer in sandy places."
