= Jollys Lookout, Queensland =

Jollys Lookout
- Suburb
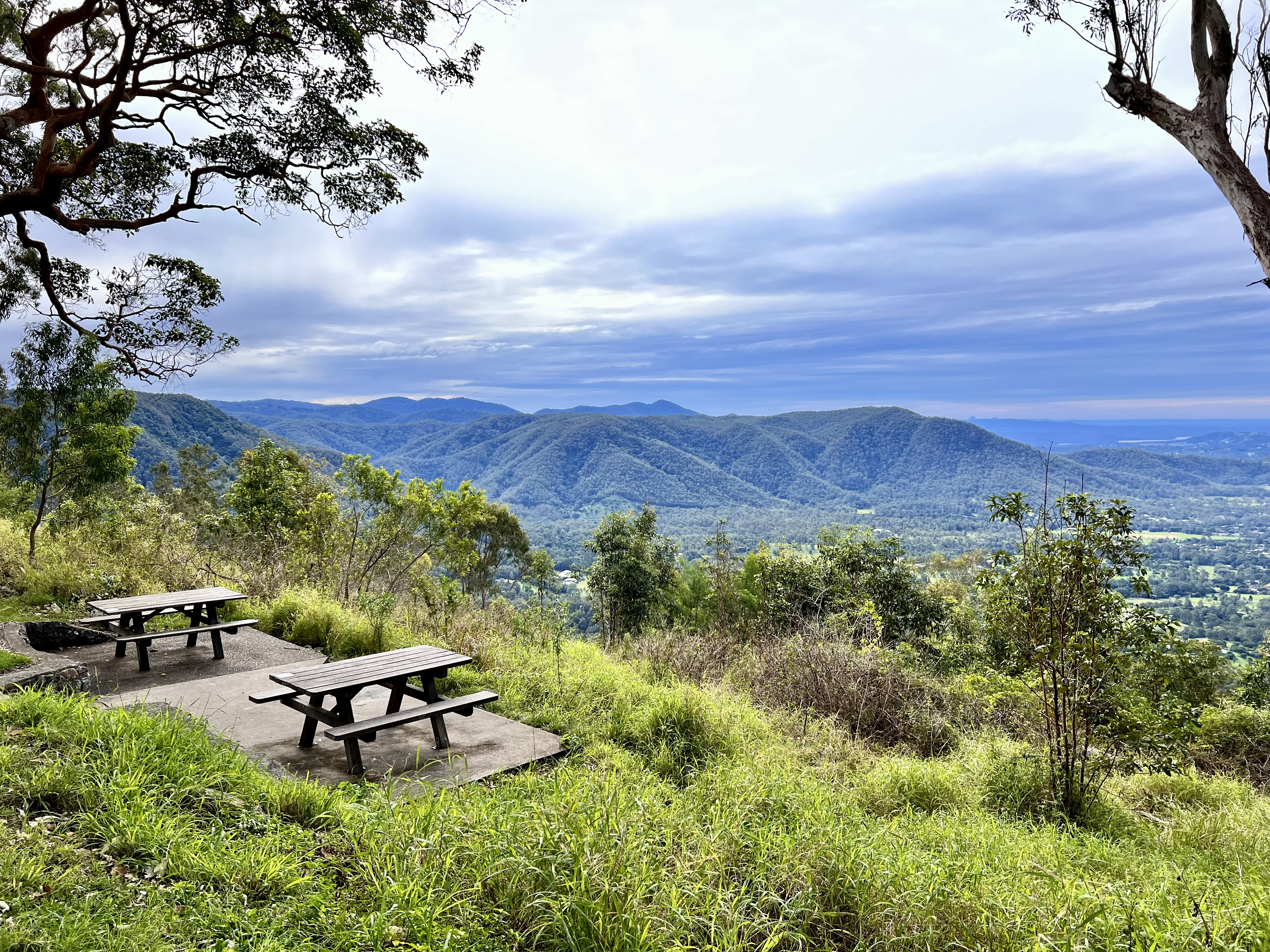
- View from Jolly's Lookout, 2022

- Interactive map of Jollys Lookout
- Coordinates: 27.4102°S 152.8269°E
- Country: Australia
- State: Queensland
- LGA: City of Moreton Bay
- Location: 14.7 km (9.1 mi) NW of The Gap; 25.7 km (16.0 mi) NW of Brisbane CBD; 36.6 km (22.7 mi) SW of Strathpine

Government
  - State electorate: Pine Rivers
  - Federal division: Ryan

Area
  - Total: 3.6 km^{2} (1.4 sq mi)

Population
  - Total: 73 (2021 census)
  - Density: 20.3/km^{2} (52.5/sq mi)
- Time zone: UTC+10:00 (AEST)
- Postcode: 4520
Suburbs around Jollys Lookout
Highvale	Wights Mountain; Camp Mountain	Camp Mountain
Highvale	Jollys Lookout	Enoggera Reservoir
Enoggera Reservoir	Enoggera Reservoir	Enoggera Reservoir

Jollys Lookout is a rural locality in the City of Moreton Bay, Queensland, Australia. In the 2021 census, Jollys Lookout had a population of 73 people.

== Geography ==
The locality is located along Mount Nebo Road between The Gap in Brisbane and Mount Nebo.

The north-western corner of the locality is within the D'Aguilar National Park, which extends into neighbouring Enoggera Reservoir and beyond. Apart from the protected area, the rest of the locality is located on the slopes of the Annand Range and has a mix of rural residential properties and undeveloped land. There is a small area of grazing on native vegetation.

== History ==
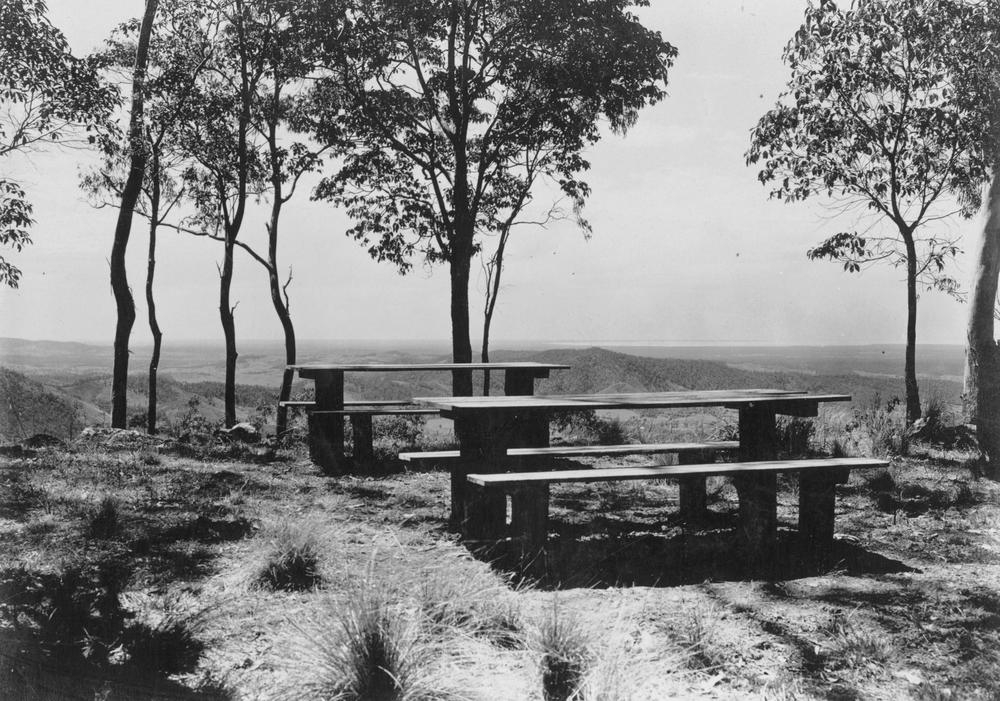
View from Jollys Lookout, circa 1935

It is named after the popular lookout of the same name, which was named after Brisbane mayor, William Jolly, who visited the lookout about 1927.

== Demographics ==
In the 2016 census, Jollys Lookout had a population of 76 people.

In the 2021 census, Jollys Lookout had a population of 73 people.

== Education ==
There are no schools in the locality. The nearest government primary school is Mount Nebo State School in Mount Nebo to the north-west. The nearest government secondary school is The Gap State High School in The Gap to the south-east.

== Amenities ==
There are a number of parks in the area:

- James Winn Park (27.4090°S 152.8293°E)
- Wohlsen Smith Park (27.4179°S 152.8455°E)

== Attractions ==
The lookout is accessed from Mount Nebo Road (27.3995°S 152.8067°E).
