= Samford railway station =

Former railway station in Queensland, Australia

Samford
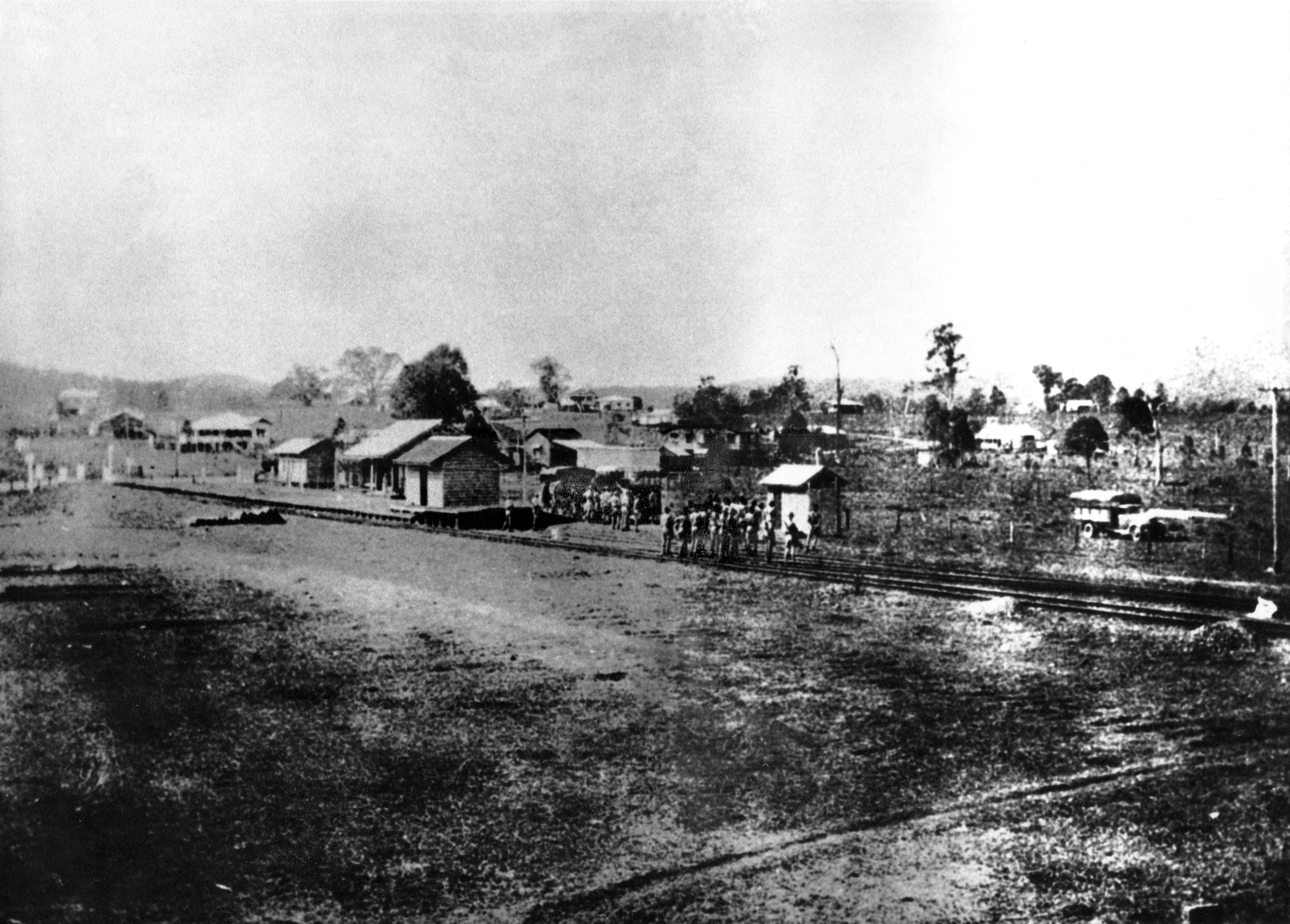
- During World War 2

General information
- Location: Samford, Queensland; Australia
- Coordinates: 27.3698°S 152.8863°E

History
- Opened: 29 June 1918

Services
Preceding station	Queensland Rail	Following station
Former service
Camp Mountain towards Roma Street	Dayboro line	Yugar towards Dayboro
Location

Samford railway station was a railway station in Samford, City of Moreton Bay, Queensland, Australia. It was located to the west of Station Street within the present-day John Scott Park.

== History ==
The station opened in 1918 and was the temporary terminus of the extension of the railway line to Samford, until further extensions reached Kobble Creek in 1919 and Dayboro in 1920. The station remained in service for 37 years, until it was closed in 1955 following the line's closure beyond Ferny Grove.
