= Corethrella marksae =

Scientific classification
- Domain: Eukaryota
- Kingdom: Animalia
- Phylum: Arthropoda
- Class: Insecta
- Order: Diptera
- Family: Corethrellidae
- Genus: Corethrella
- Species: C. marksae

Binomial name
- Corethrella marksae Colless, 1986

Synonyms
- Corethra marksae Colless, 1986

Species of fly

Corethrella marksae is a species of frog-biting midge in the family Corethrellidae first circumscribed in 1986 by entomologist D. H. Colless, who named it in honor of Dr. Elizabeth Nesta Marks. It is the type species for the marksae species-group.

The type specimens of C. marksae were collected from a "small, pebbly back-water of a flowing river" in Australia.
