= Culex marksae =

Scientific classification
- Kingdom: Animalia
- Phylum: Arthropoda
- Class: Insecta
- Order: Diptera
- Family: Culicidae
- Genus: Culex
- Species: C. marksae

Binomial name
- Culex marksae King and Hoogstraal, 1955

Species of mosquito

Culex marksae is a species of mosquito in the subgenus Lophoceraomyia first circumscribed in 1955 by Willard V. King and Harry Hoogstraal. The specific epithet honors Dr. Elizabeth N. Marks whose research and writings "added a great deal to the knowledge of Australasian Culicidae."

C. marksae is small to medium-sized, the wings usually about 3.0 mm in length, the thorax deep brown to black, the abdominal tergites having dark scales, and wings and legs lacking prominent ornamentation.

== Bionomics ==
C. marksae is the type of a taxonomic complex that includes the species C. versabilis, C. muruae, C. kowiroensis, C. wamanguae and C. leei. Members of the marksae complex breed in natural containers such as palm bracts and sago stumps and occasionally in small ground pools along stream margins in sago swamps or in the rainforest, and are capable of breeding in artificial containers. The adults are rarely encountered in general field catches, and no direct evidence has been put forward to indicate that species of Lophoceraomyia bite humans, although several field-caught females have been found to be engorged with a substance resembling blood, suggesting that they might feed on wild birds or other animals in nature.

== Distribution ==
Indonesia, the island of New Guinea; Western New Guinea, and Singapore.
