= Insect scale =

Biological covering on an insect

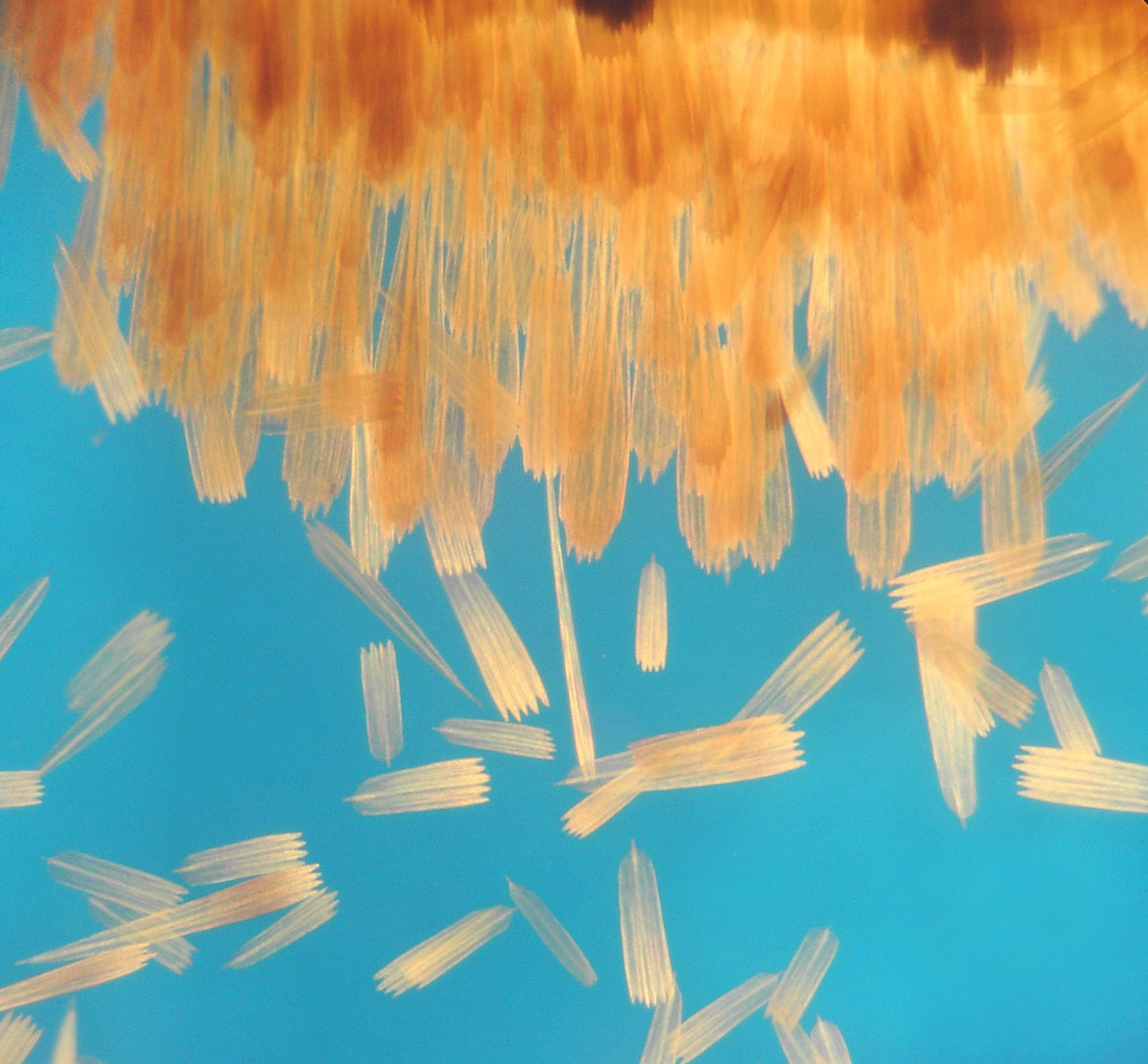
Wing scales form the colour and pattern on wings. The scales shown here are lamellar. The pedicel can be seen attached to a few loose scales.

Scales are present on the bodies of various insects. A notable example are the Lepidoptera, the insect order comprising moths and butterflies, which have scales on their wings and on the head, parts of the thorax and abdomen, and parts of the genitalia. The name is derived from Ancient Greek λεπίδος (scale) and πτερόν (wing).

The Trichoptera (caddisflies) which are a sister group of the Lepidoptera have scales, but also possess caudal cerci on the abdomen, a feature absent in the Lepidoptera. Beetles of family Dermestidae also commonly have scales. Within the dipteran infraorder Culicomorpha, possession of a scale fringe on the posterior margin of the forewings is a proposed synapomorphy of Corethrellidae, Chaoboridae and Culicidae.

Many Zygentoma and Archaeognatha have scales on their bodies, whose iridescent appearance gives certain Zygentoma the common name of silverfish.

== Morphology ==
=== Lepidoptera ===
The morphology of lepidopteran scales has been studied by Downey & Allyn (1975) and scales have been classified into three groups, namely:

- Hair-like or piliform.
- Blade-like or lamellar.
- Other variable forms.

Primitive moths (non-Glossata and Eriocranidae) have 'solid' scales which are imperforate, i.e., they lack a lumen.

As per Scoble (2005):

Morphologically, scales are macrotrichia, and thus homologous with the large hairs (and scales) that cover the wings of Trichoptera (caddisflies).

==== Structure ====
Though there is great diversity in scale form, they are structured similarly. The body or 'blade' of a typical scale consists of an upper and lower lamina. The surface of the lower lamina is smooth whereas the structure of the upper lamina is structured and intricate. Scales are attached to the substrate by a stalk or 'pedicel'. The scales cling somewhat loosely to the wing and come off easily without harming the insect.

==== Colour ====
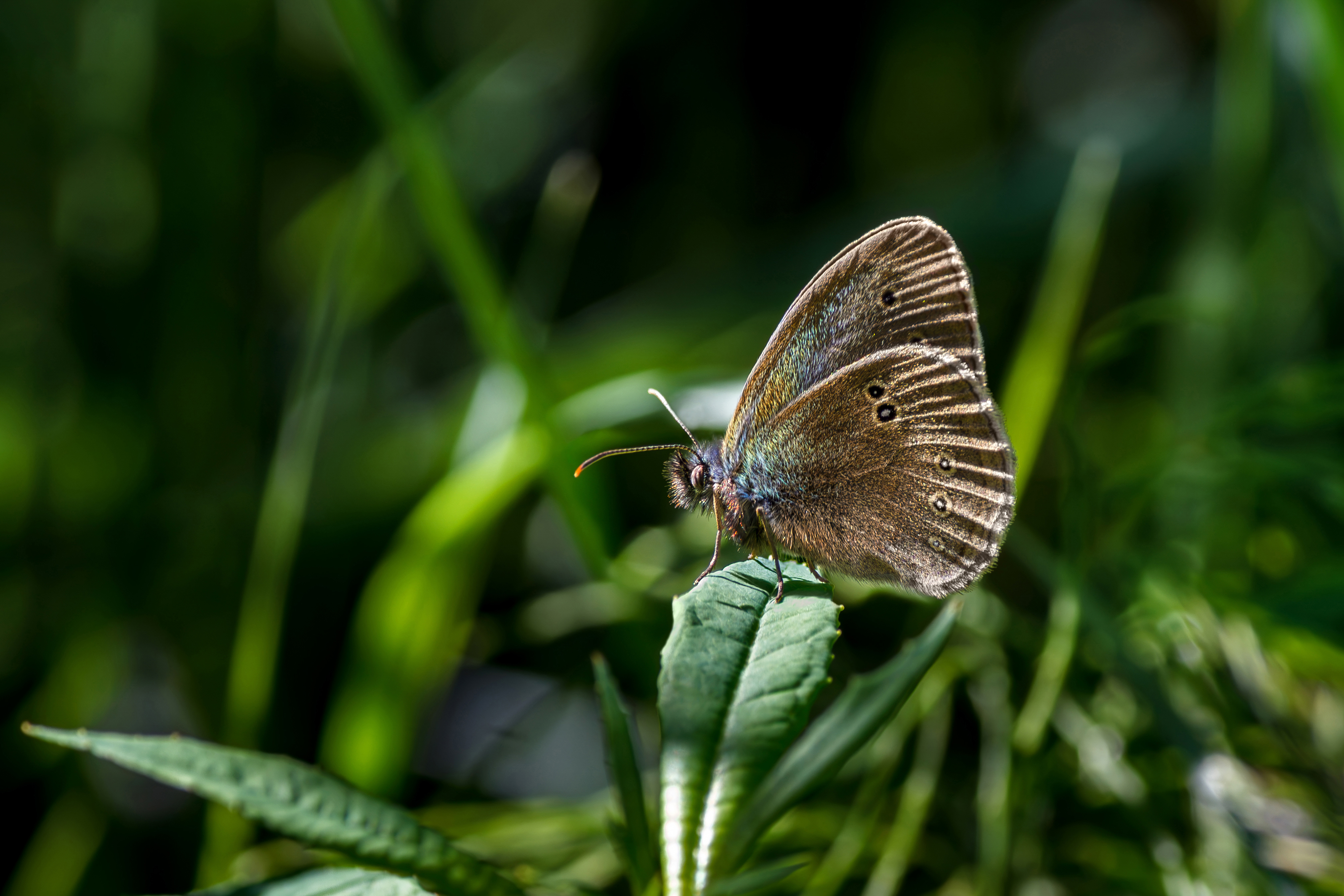
While the hair-like scales on a ringlet are brown or gray, they can take on an iridescent sheen by diffraction when light hit them at the right angle. This phenomenon can also be seen in bird wings and other thin structures.

The colouration of butterfly wings is created by the scales which are pigmented with melanins that give them blacks and browns, but blues, greens, reds and iridescence are usually created not by pigments but the microstructure of the scales. This structural coloration is the result of coherent scattering of light by the photonic crystal nature of the scales.

==== Function ====
Scales play an important part in the natural history of Lepidoptera. Scales enable development of vivid or indistinct patterns which help the organism protect itself by concealment and camouflage, mimicry and warning. Besides providing insulation, dark patterns on wings provided by dark colour scales would allow sunlight to be absorbed and thus probably have a role to play in thermoregulation. Bright and distinctive colour patterns in butterflies which are distasteful to predators help communicate their aposematism (toxicity or inedibility) thus preventing a predator from preying on it. In Batesian mimicry, wing colour patterns help edible Lepidopterans mimic inedible models while in Müllerian mimicry inedible butterflies resemble each other to reduce the numbers of individuals sampled by predators.

Scales possibly evolved initially for providing insulation. Scales on the thorax and other parts of the body probably contribute to maintaining the high body temperatures required during flight. The 'solid' scales of basal moths are however not as efficient as those of their more advanced relatives as the presence of a lumen adds air layers and increases the insulation value.

Young adults of myrmecophilous Lepidoptera escape from ant nests by virtue of the deciduous waxy scales with which they are covered when born. These scales rub off and stick on the ants as they make their way out of the nest after hatching.

Scales greatly reduce fatalities among Lepidoptera after flying into spiderwebs. The detachable scales pull away freely and enable the insect to escape. (Forsyth 1992:12) Thomas Eisner tested spiderwebs' effectiveness by dropping various insects onto the webs. Moths were consistently able to escape, and all left impact spots where scales had stuck to the web. Eisner found these spots to be common. (Eisner 2003:218-220)

Scales also help increase the lift to drag ratio in gliding flight.

Successive close-ups of the scales of a Peacock wing

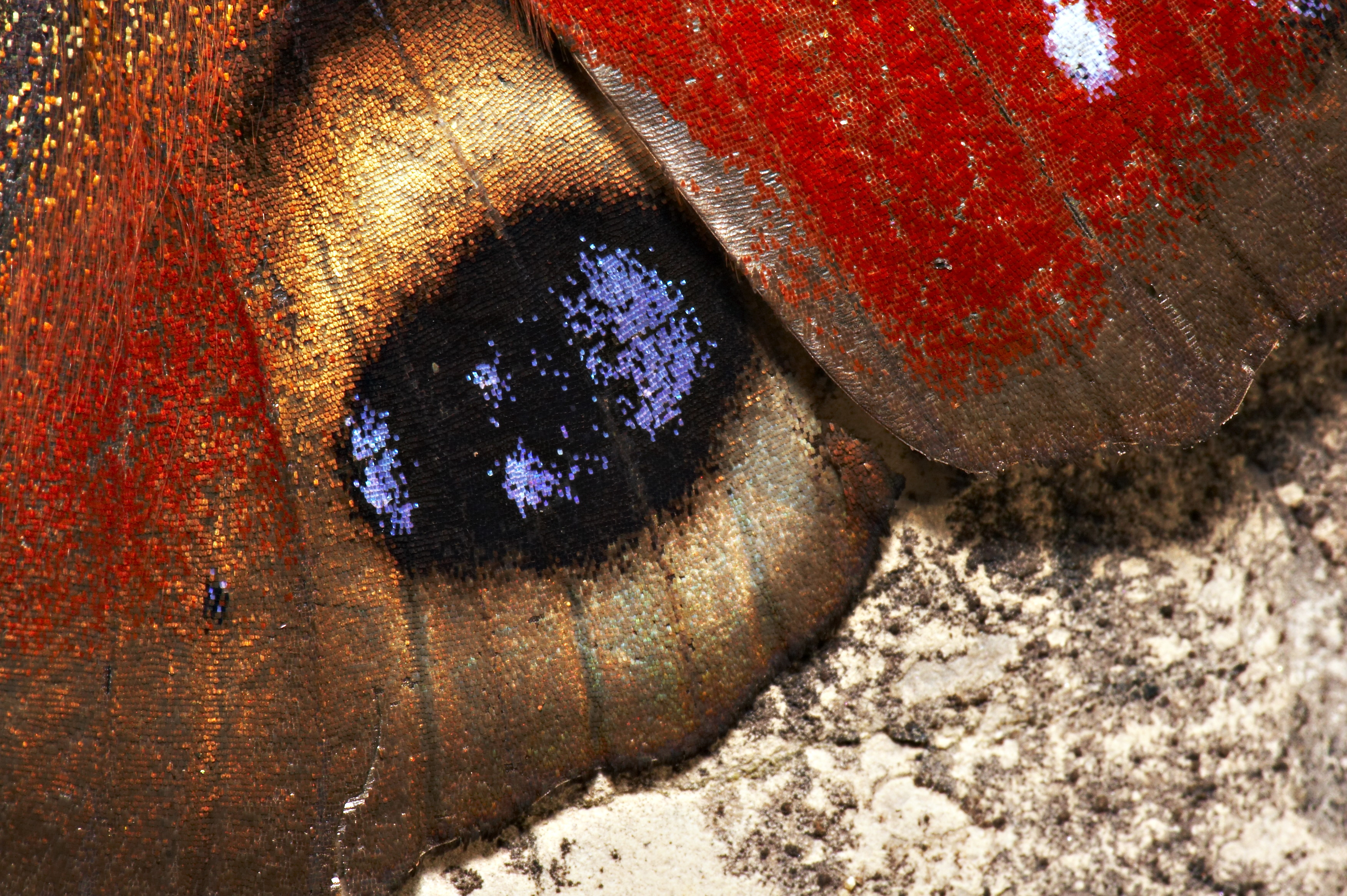
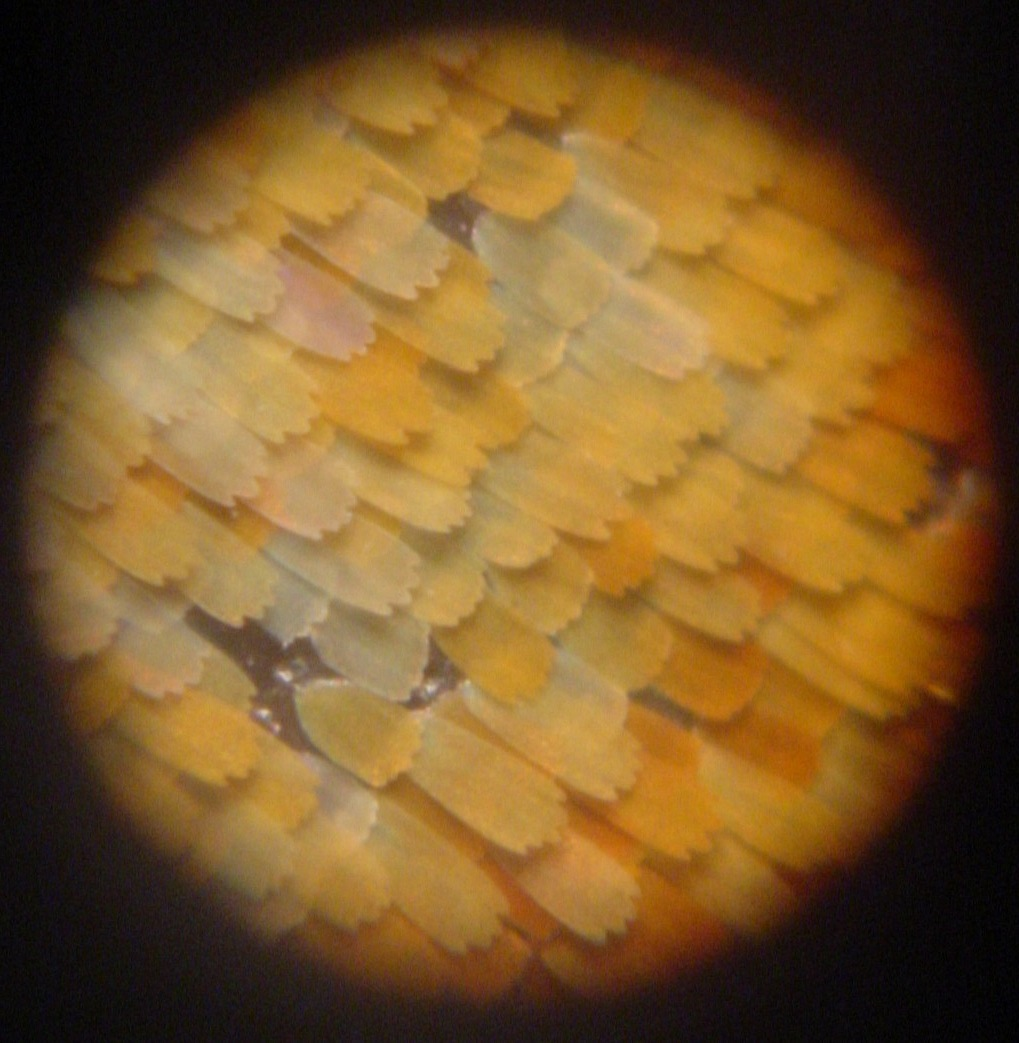
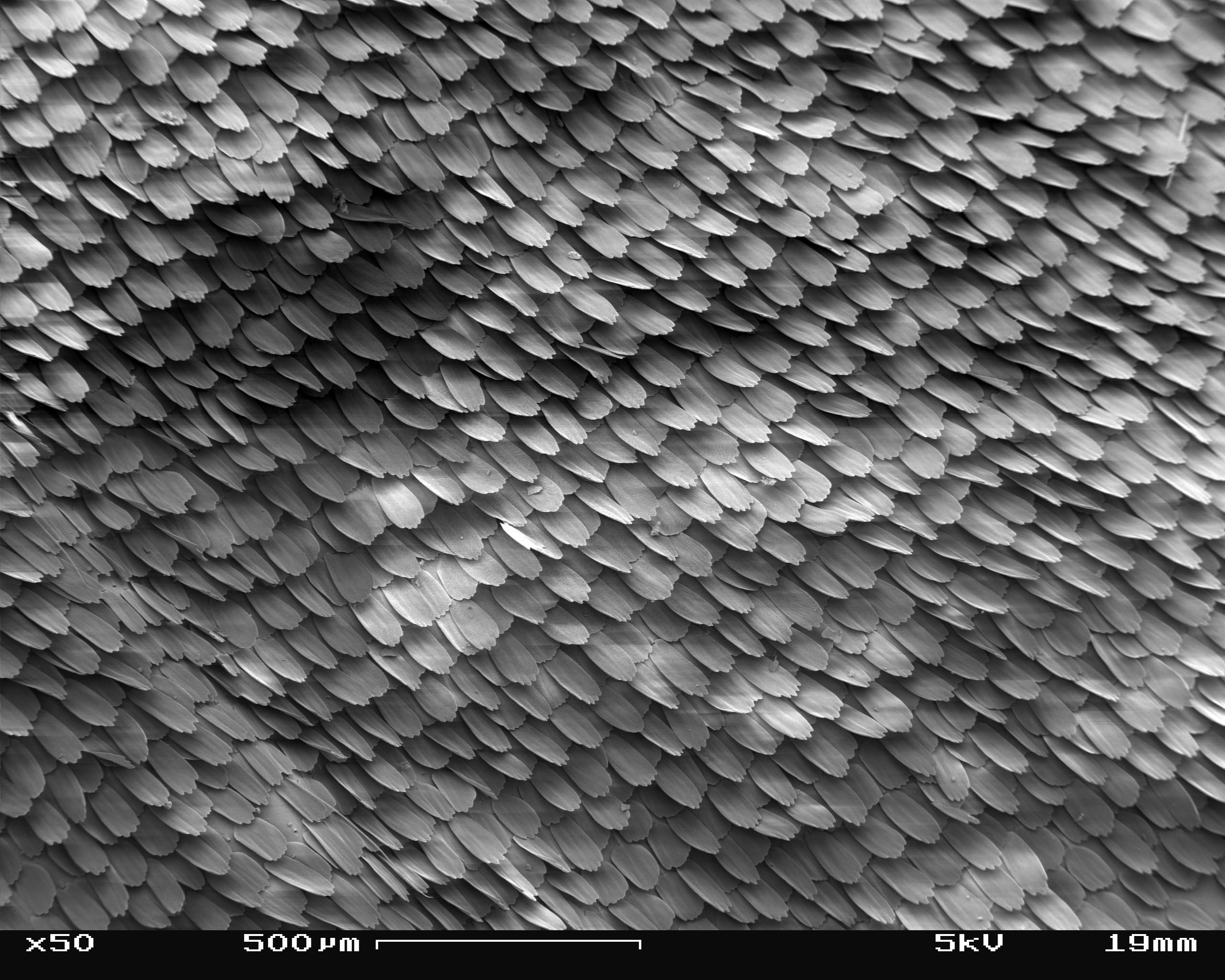
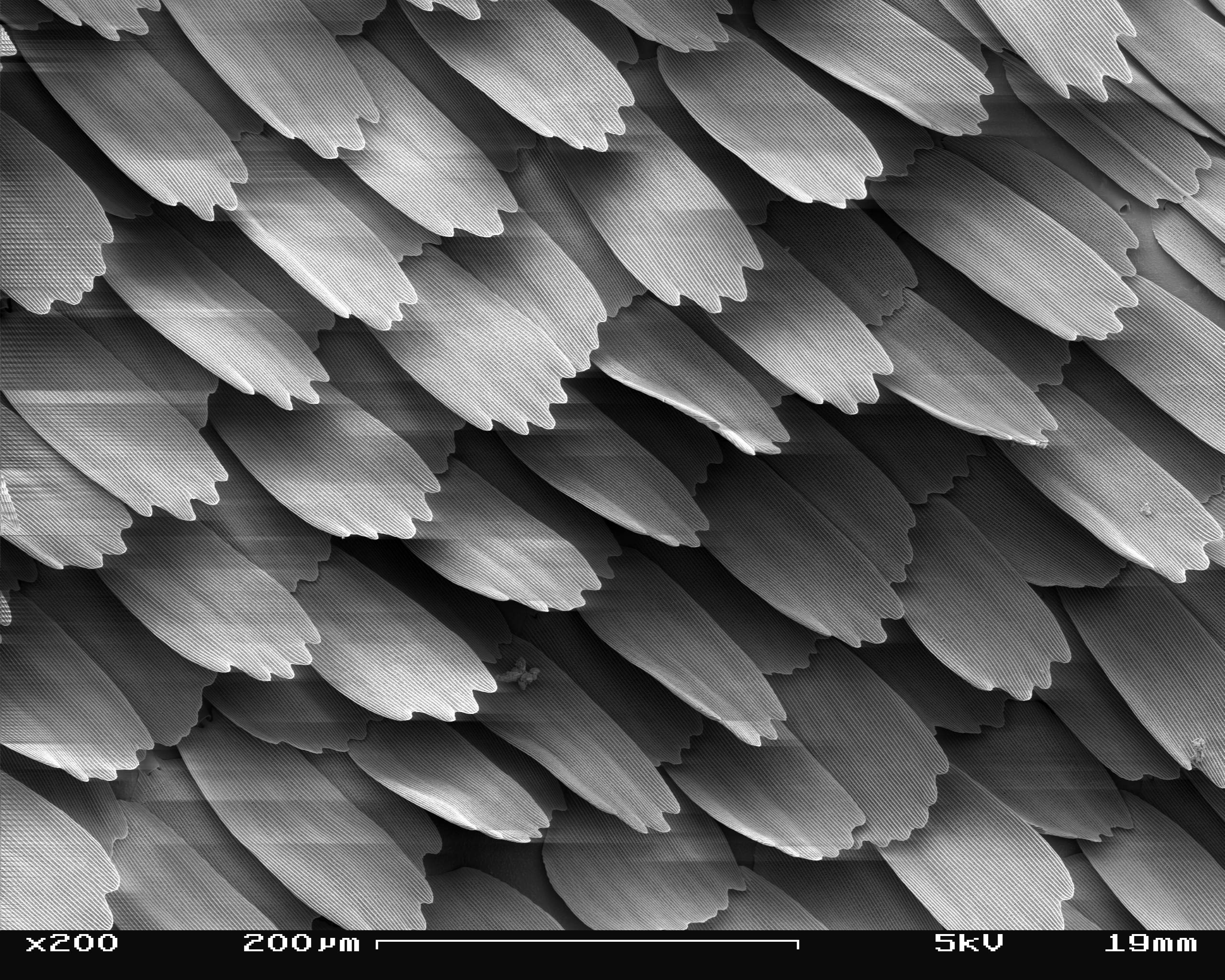
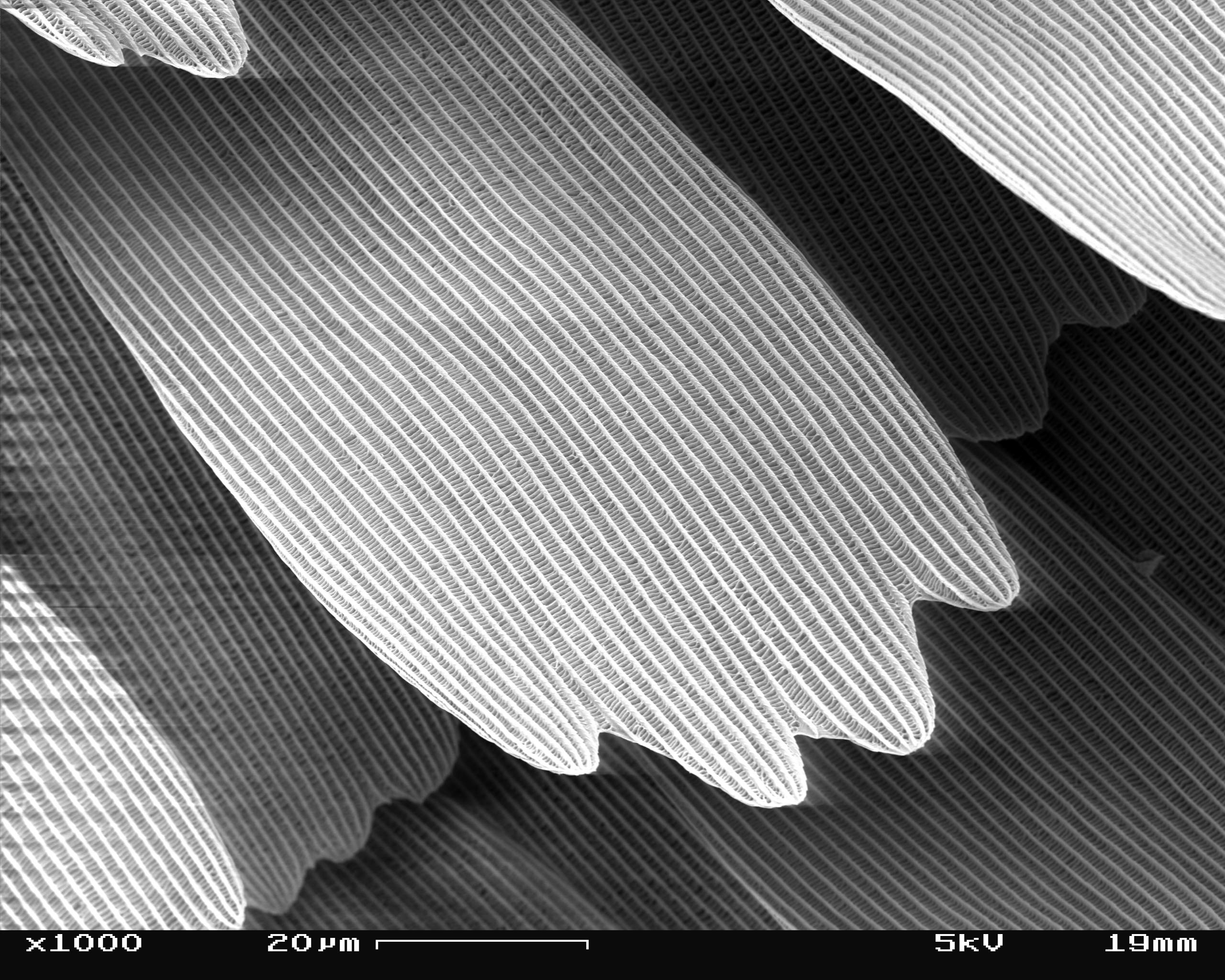
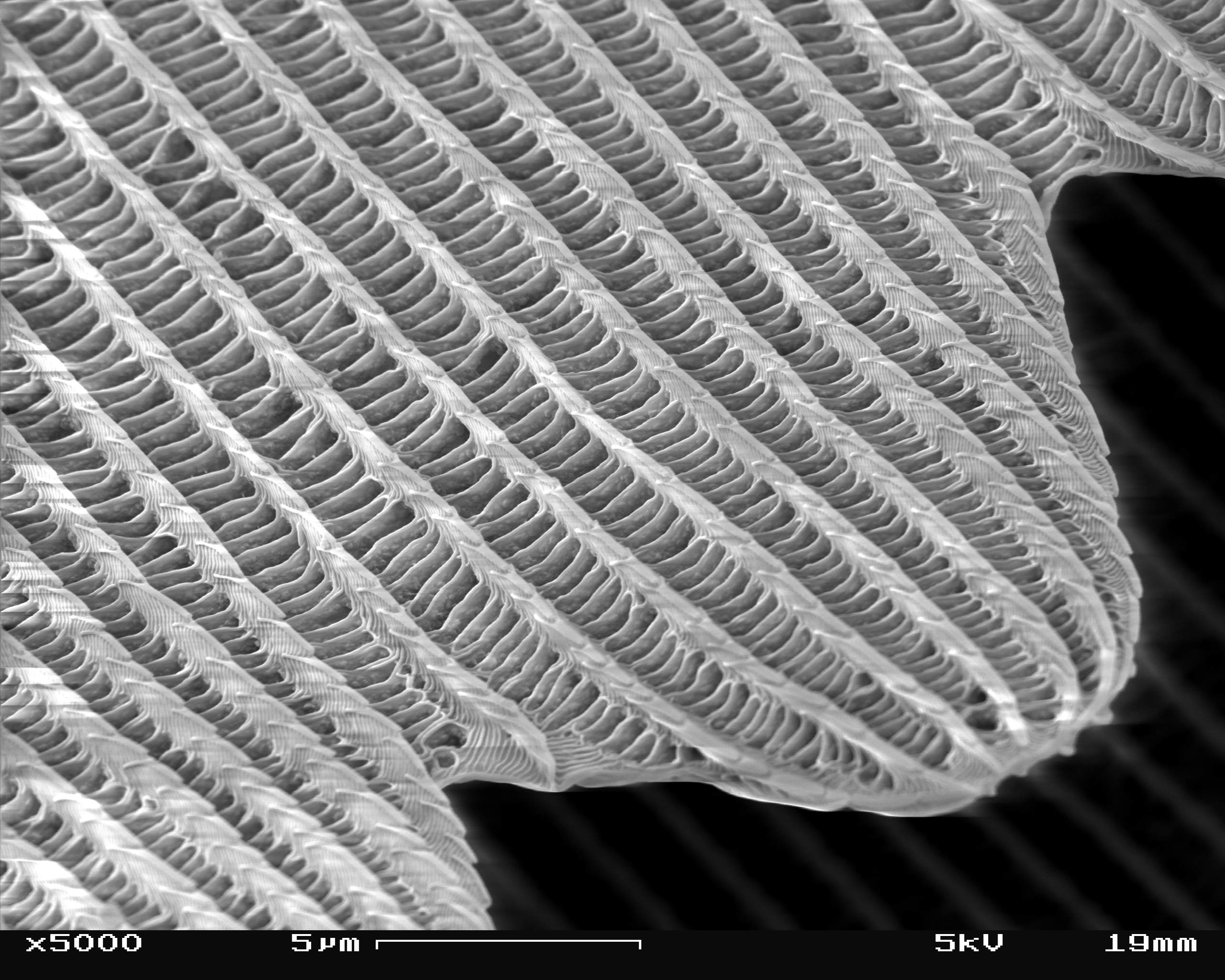
Photographic and light microscopic images
	Zoomed-out view of an Aglais io.	Closeup of the scales of the same specimen.	High magnification of the coloured scales (probably a different species).
Electron microscopic images
	A patch of wing	Scales close up	A single scale	Microstructure of a scale
Magnification	Approx. ×50	Approx. ×200	×1000	×5000

=== Zygentoma and Archaeognatha ===
The orders Zygentoma and Archaeognatha were formerly united as suborders of Thysanura, but were found to not have a sister relationship and were consequently elevated as orders. Scales are not present in the first instar in either order, appearing after one or more molts—two in Archaeognatha. The extent of scaling varies between taxa, with at least the three terminal filaments, tergites and abdominal coxites bearing scales in known Archaeognatha. Certain families of Zygentoma are scaleless.

==== Structure ====
The structure of scales differs between the two orders; Zygentoma scales have a membrane with raised ribs on their upper surface, while Archaeognatha scales contain a porous lumen formed by upper and lower plates.

==== Function ====
The scales of Zygentoma and Archaeognatha may serve anti-predator and mechanosensory functions.

== See also ==
- Scale (zoology)
- External morphology of Lepidoptera
