= Wights Mountain, Queensland =

Wights Mountain Queensland
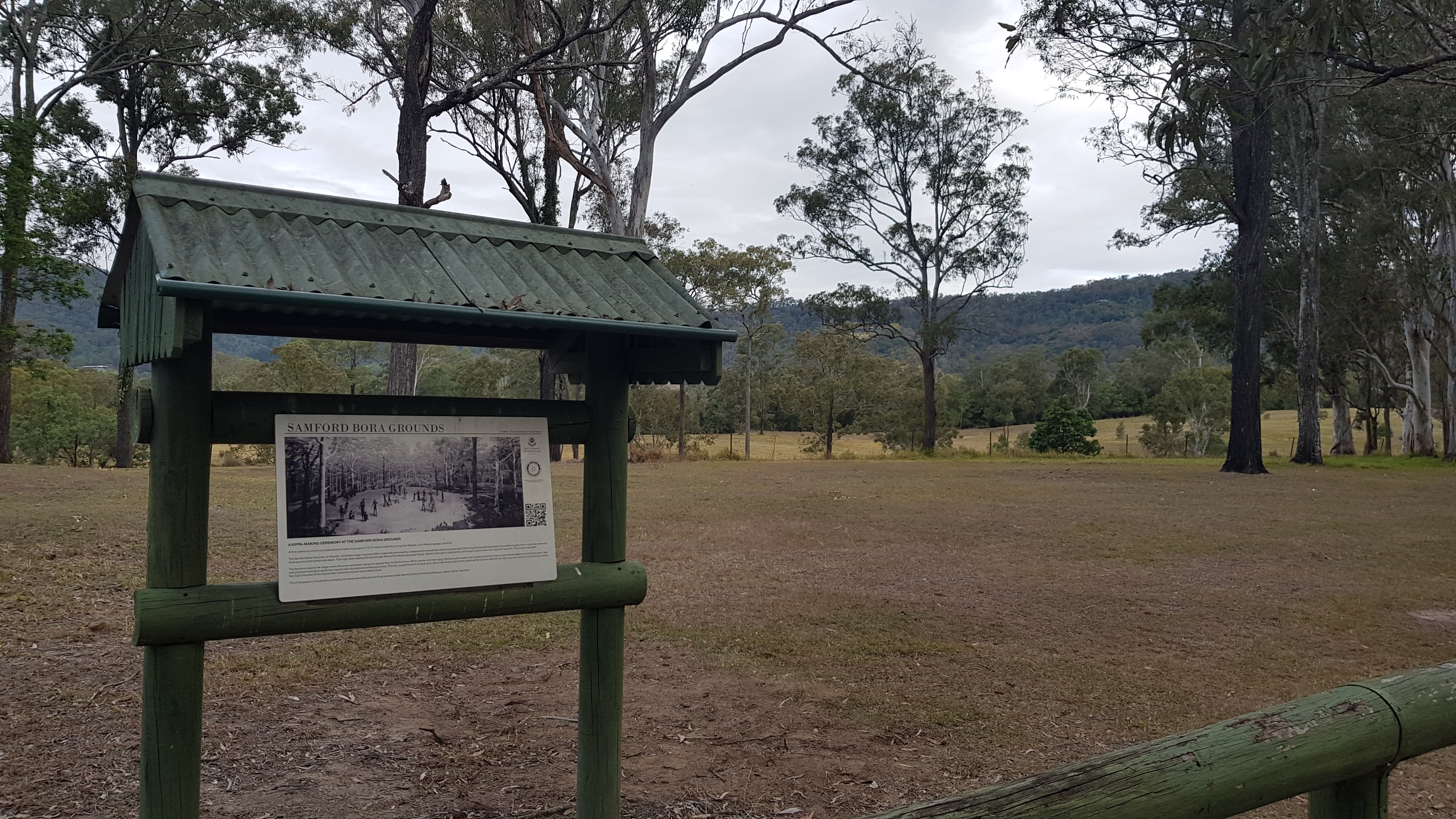
- Samford Bora Grounds, 2023

- Coordinates: 27.3963°S 152.8475°E
- Population: 767 (2021 census)
  - Density: 84.3/km^{2} (218.3/sq mi)
- Postcode(s): 4520
- Area: 9.1 km^{2} (3.5 sq mi)
- Time zone: AEST (UTC+10:00)
- Location: 23.3 km (14 mi) SW of Strathpine; 27.8 km (17 mi) NW of Brisbane CBD
- LGA(s): City of Moreton Bay
- State electorate(s): Pine Rivers
- Federal division(s): Dickson
Suburbs around Wights Mountain:
Highvale	Samford Valley	Samford Valley
Highvale	Wights Mountain	Camp Mountain
Jollys Lookout	Jollys Lookout	Jollys Lookout

Wights Mountain is a rural locality in the City of Moreton Bay, Queensland, Australia. In the 2021 census, Wights Mountain had a population of 767 people.

== Geography ==
Wights Mountain is 27.8 kilometres (17.3 mi) by road from the Brisbane CBD.

== History ==
The locality was named after selector George Wight who settled in the area in the late 1860s.

Samford Valley Steiner School opened on 18 February 1987.

== Demographics ==
In the 2011 census, Wights Mountain had a population of 725 people, 50.3% female and 49.7% male. The median age of the Wights Mountain population was 41 years, 4 years above the national median of 37. 75.2% of people living in Wights Mountain were born in Australia. The other top responses for country of birth were England 8.6%, New Zealand 2.5%, Canada 1.2%, United States of America 1.1%, Switzerland 1.1%. 93.5% of people spoke only English at home; the next most common languages were 1.8% German, 0.6% Hindi, 0.4% French, 0.4% Cantonese, 0.4% Italian.

In the 2016 census, Wights Mountain had a population of 793 people.

In the 2021 census, Wights Mountain had a population of 767 people.

== Education ==
Samford Valley Steiner School is a private primary and secondary (Prep-12) school for boys and girls at Narrawa Drive (27.3924°S 152.8583°E). In 2017, the school had an enrolment of 339 students with 29 teachers (26 full-time equivalent) and 29 non-teaching staff (21 full-time equivalent).

== Amenities ==
There are a number of parks in the locality:

- Bora Park (27.4010°S 152.8523°E)
- Harold Brown Park (27.3917°S 152.8634°E)
- Hope River Park (27.3933°S 152.8413°E)
- Small Park (27.3992°S 152.8454°E)
