= Elizabeth Nesta Marks =

Australian entomologist

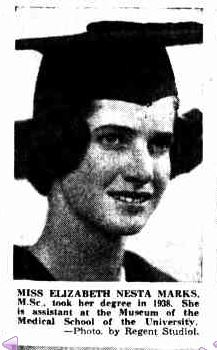
- Elizabeth Nesta Marks (1918–2002) taking her M.Sc. Masters of Arts and Sciences. (4 May 1940).
- Born: 28 April 1918; Dublin, Ireland
- Died: 25 October 2002 (aged 84); Brisbane, Queensland, Australia
- Education: University of Queensland, University of Cambridge
- Scientific career
- Fields: Entomologist

Elizabeth Nesta "Pat" Marks AO (28 April 1918 – 25 October 2002) was an Australian entomologist who described 38 new mosquito species, as well as new species of fruit flies, bugs, cockroaches and ticks. She had a PhD in insect physiology from the University of Cambridge and was a member of the Royal Entomological Society of London.

== Early life ==
Marks was born in Dublin, Ireland, in 1918, and was known by the name Pat or Patricia for the Cathedral she was christened in (St Patrick's Cathedral). Her father, Ted (Edward Oswald) Marks, born in Brisbane in 1882, was a geologist and inventor (later an ophthalmologist) from a family of doctors. Ted Marks, travelled to Ireland twice to undertake his studies because of the absence of a university in Queensland. He left for Ireland in 1913 to conduct his medical studies and married Nesta Drury, also of Brisbane, in 1914. Their daughter Pat was born following his service in WW1 An only child, Pat Marks and her family returned to Australia in 1920, residing in Wickham Terrace, Brisbane for over 60 years alongside a large extended family. After attending St John's Cathedral School in Brisbane and the Glennie Memorial School in Toowoomba as a boarder, where she left as Dux of the school in 1934, she enrolled in the University of Queensland. She was interested in becoming a veterinarian, but her father encouraged her to pursue entomology. The Marks family had a strong interest in the natural sciences and the importance of science serving the community. Marks excelled at swimming at school, was an accomplished horsewoman, getting her first horse at age 5, and participated in hockey at UQ. She also swam later for Cambridge. Weekends were spent at her grandfather's farm at Camp Mountain near Samford, where the family ran horses. Marks graduated from UQ with a B.Sc. in 1938, principally studying zoology, and gained her Honours (second class) degree in the parasitology of marsupial animals in 1939. She would earn a M.Sc. in 1940, studying under supervisor, Dr Ronald Hamlyn-Harris. Dr Hamlyn-Harris was Brisbane's then leading entomologist studying the biological control of mosquitoes.

== Early career ==
In 1939, Marks began work as Assistant Curator of the Pathology Museum in the newly established University of Queensland Medical School. However she balanced her interests in medicine and entomology by tutoring medical students who were taking classes with her former lecturer, F. Athol Perkins. Marks became a Graduate Research Assistant at the University of Queensland in 1943, working for the Department of Entomology and Mosquito Control Committee (MCC). Due to the outbreak of WW2 and the movement of Australian troops into New Guinea where high levels of malaria existed, mosquito control became a significant issue. Casualties from malaria outstripped war related casualties Outbreaks of Dengue Fever affected both Brisbane and Cairns. Marks was brought in to assist F. Athol Perkins in providing material for the Army to use in their Malaria training schools. Marks continued to work to identify Queensland mosquitoes and research their taxonomy and breeding biology, so that adequate measures could be applied to control the risk of disease carried by them. She identified the breeding behaviour of many mosquitoes including Aedes culiciformis. She would also be tasked with going into areas with unexpectedly large numbers of mosquitoes. Her work for the Health department's eradication program of Aedes aegypti led to this mosquito's disappearance in the Brisbane area where it had caused Dengue Fever outbreaks. In 1955, two entomologists who had worked in the South Pacific during World War II, Willard V. King and Harry Hoogstraal, named a mosquito they collected at Hollandia, Netherlands New Guinea, in 1945, Culex marksae to honor her; the corethrellid midge Corethrella marksae is also named in her honor.

== Study in Europe ==
Marks worked for both the Queensland Health department and UQ until 1949 when she took leave to visit Europe. She visited Amsterdam, the London School of Hygiene and Tropical Medicine and the British Museum of Natural History (now Natural History Museum).

Marks continued her research while overseas, completing her PhD in insect physiology at the University of Cambridge, Newnham College. She joined the Royal Entomological Society of London while at Cambridge.

== Later research ==
She returned to Australia in 1951 where she undertook fieldwork for Dr Bill Reeves in Mildura, Victoria and in Townsville in 1952, exploring outbreaks of Murray Valley encephalitis. Another member of this team was Dr Josephine Mackerras, who Marks would work with on many occasions. She would travel to the Torres Strait Islands on research expeditions for the Queensland Institute of Medical Research (QIMR). In 1954, Marks made a significant collection of marine insects off Low Isles Reef of far North Queensland. Other members of the expedition included Dr Mackerras, Isobel Bennett and Dorothy Hill. Marks discovered a tiny marine insect on the reef near Heron Island, where a UQ research station was being established. It was named Corallocoris marksae in recognition of her discovery.

From 1951–1973 she managed a number of projects including a study of the insects used by the Commonwealth Scientific and Industrial Research Organisation (CSIRO) Wildlife Survey Section for the introduction of myxomatosis in rabbits. This included collecting specimens in rural Australia and the Torres Strait Islands. She also trained many of Queensland’s health inspectors.

In 1958, Marks travelled to New Guinea for three months with funding from the Bishop Museum of Hawaii, and travelled to a remote region near the Mamberamo River. She would make later expeditions to New Guinea in 1959, 1961, 1966 and 1979.

Marks transferred to the QIMR when the Mosquito Control Committee was disbanded in 1973, working as the Principal Entomologist. However QIMR had no room for her until 1976, so she remained at UQ during that time.

== Retirement activities ==
Marks retired in 1983 but continued to work at QIMR, and transferred her research energies to history, specifically of science, scientists and their professional societies. She also researched local and Queensland history, attending Brisbane History Group meetings and functions. After she inherited part of her family's farm at Camp Mountain near Samford, she joined the Samford Historical Society. She researched and championed protection of the Samford Bora rings (indigenous ceremonial sites) in the 1970s. Marks retired to Samford in 1982, raising and riding horses until she was 80.

In 1973, a new Regulation 13A of the Australian Federal Customs Act 1901–1971 was added, which thwarted efforts of major researchers to exchange biological specimens between museums and researchers overseas for research or to obtain specimens for permanent collection in overseas museums. Marks and many other entomologists fought this regulation speaking to government officials, politicians and working with the Australian Academy of Science. The matter would drag on for ten years, before the regulation would disappear from the Act.

== Awards and memberships ==
Marks was a member of sixteen societies including the Entomological Society of Queensland, Australian Entomological Society and President of the Royal Society of Queensland in 1959. She was a long time member of the Queensland Naturalists Club (1937–2002) having been involved with them in her youth through camps and was their President in 1952. She was a long time member of the Australian Conservation Foundation. She edited the Fraser Island issue of the journal Queensland Naturalist. She wrote entries for the Australian Dictionary of Biography on early naturalists, and gave addresses to many to meetings and seminars.

In 1981, she received the Australian Natural History Award of the field Naturalists Club of Victoria. In 1986, she shared the Belkin Award from the American Mosquito Association for excellence in systematics. In 1990 she was appointed an Officer of the Order of Australia (AO) for her services to science, and in particular to entomology.

Elizabeth Nesta Marks died in 2002.

== Writings ==
Marks, Elizabeth N. Studies of Queensland Mosquitoes. Brisbane: University of Queensland Press, 1947.

Other major publications included the Atlas of Common Queensland Mosquitoes (1966) and the 12-volume set The Culicidae of Australasia (1980–1989).

She published Insects of Australia, a history of Australian entomology in 1991.

In 2004, she co-wrote a memoir with Kathleen Cummins, Mosquitoes and Memories: Recollections of 'Patricia' Marks.

== Legacy ==
Elizabeth Marks alone or jointly described 38 new mosquito species (for example, Culiseta arenivaga Marks, 1968), as well as new species of fruit flies, bugs, cockroaches and ticks. Another 43 species of mosquito identified by her, have yet to be described satisfactorily. She was well known for her practical streak, being able to solve problems with inventive solutions. She was equally famous for her Army metal soup ladle which was used to collect mosquito larvae and as an oar when an outboard motor might break down.

Geoff Monteith of the Queensland Museum described her as "a woman of imposing presence and strong personality, with a sense of obligation to her science and the community in a broader context".

She wrote her autobiography with Kathleen Cummins, entitled – Mosquitoes and Memories: Recollections of ‘Patricia’ Marks. This was published posthumously in 2004.

Over 70 boxes of her papers were donated to the University of Queensland Library upon her death. Many items relating to the social history of Queensland including furniture and cars were donated by Pat Marks and her extended family to the Queensland Museum, John Oxley Library at the State Library of Queensland, the Samford Museum and Queensland Art Gallery. The E.N. Marks' insect collection was donated to the University of Queensland.

The Marks family farm was sold off, but the old cottage now exists at the Queensland University of Technology’s Samford Ecological Research Facility (SERF).

In 2015 the Australian Entomological Society announced that the Pat Marks Award would be presented every two years to recognise lifetime contributions to entomology.
