= Samford, Queensland =

Samford
- Town
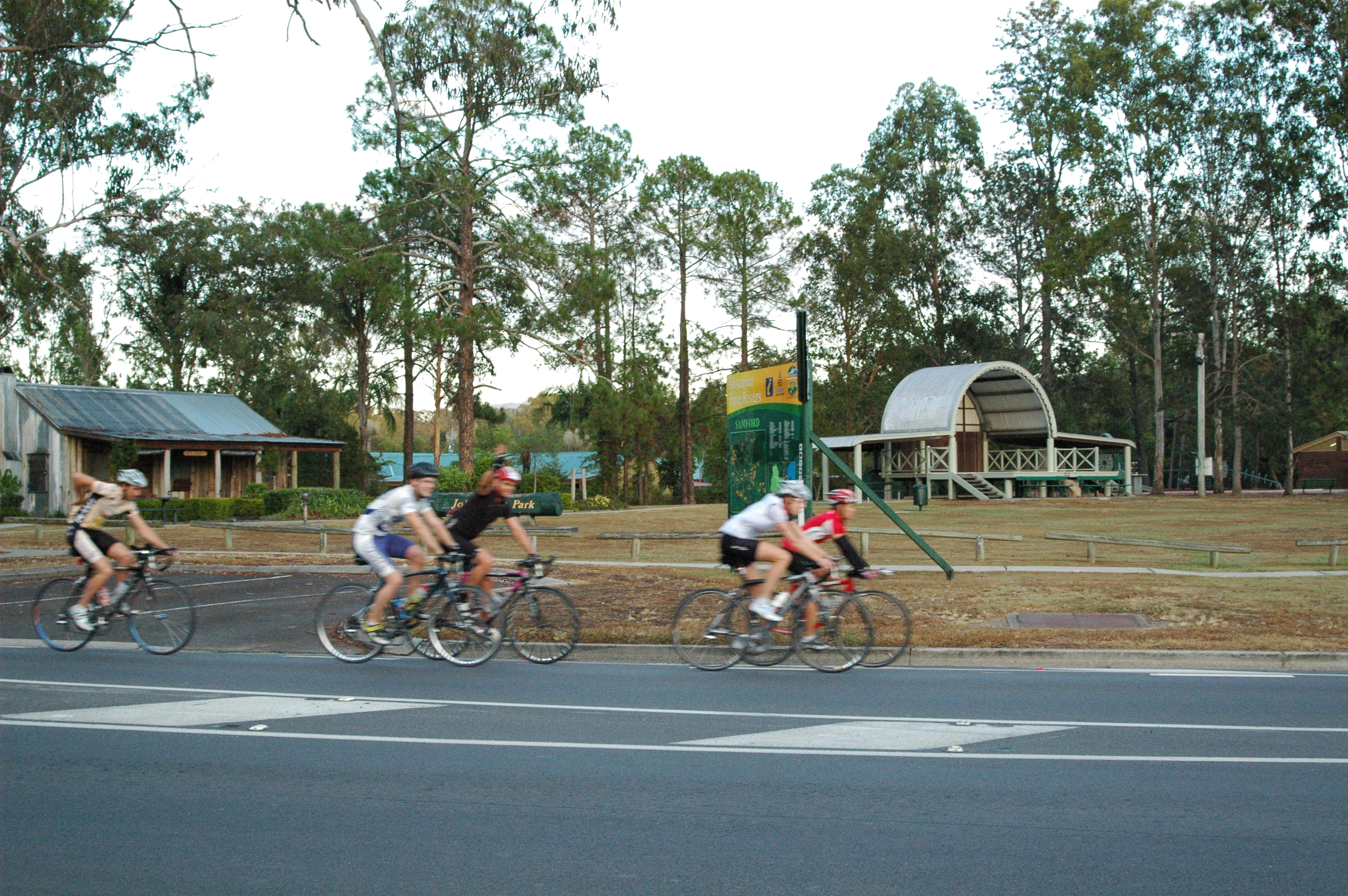
- Centre of Samford Village

- Coordinates: 27.3722°S 152.8869°E
- Country: Australia
- State: Queensland
- LGA: City of Moreton Bay
- Location: 18.7 km (11.6 mi) SW of Strathpine; 21.9 km (13.6 mi) NW of Brisbane
- Established: 1855

Government
  - State electorate: Pine Rivers
  - Federal division: Dickson

Population
  - Total: 656 (2006 census)
- Time zone: UTC+10:00 (AEST)
- Postcode: 4520
Localities around Samford
| Cedar Creek | Yugar | Draper |
| Highvale | Samford | Draper |
| Wights Mountain | Camp Mountain | Ferny Hills |

Samford is a town in the City of Moreton Bay, South East Queensland, Australia. It consists of two localities, Samford Village and Samford Valley. In 2006 census, the town of Samford had a population of 656 people.

== Geography ==
Samford is a hilly area, roughly 21 kilometres (13 mi) north west of Brisbane. Access to Samford from Brisbane is via Samford Road through the Samford State Forest and takes about 10 minutes from Ferny Grove.

Samford is located adjacent to the Samford State Forest section of Brisbane Forest Park. Brisbane Forest Park comprises more than 26,500 ha enclosing 16 separate recreation areas. The wide variety of habitat provides a sanctuary for a broad range of native wildlife. Parts of D'Aguilar Range, which includes nearby Camp Mountain, Mount Nebo, Mount Glorious and Mount Pleasant, give rise to the valley in which Samford lies.

== History ==
Samford was occupied by the indigenous people who named it Kupidabin, an Aboriginal word from the Waka language, meaning 'place of possums'. They named D.L. Brown's land in Samford, Karandukamari. Samford was an important location for "kippa-ring" or initiation ceremony. Tribes from Ipswich, Cressbrook, Mount Brisbane and Brisbane would travel here to have their "kippas" (young men) initiated.

Samford's very first inhabitants were an aboriginal tribe which belonged to the Waka language group, whose territory also included the upper Brisbane River and the South Burnett. While there are no aboriginal tribes still living in Samford, their history remains by means of the Bora Ring at Wights Mountain, the burial site near Upper Camp Mountain Road and the records kept at the local historical museum.

Although Samford is closer to Brisbane than most acreage areas in the City of Moreton Bay, the secluded valleys of the upper reaches of the South Pine River were not settled by Europeans until the mid-1850s. The first land auctions were held on 1 February 1855.

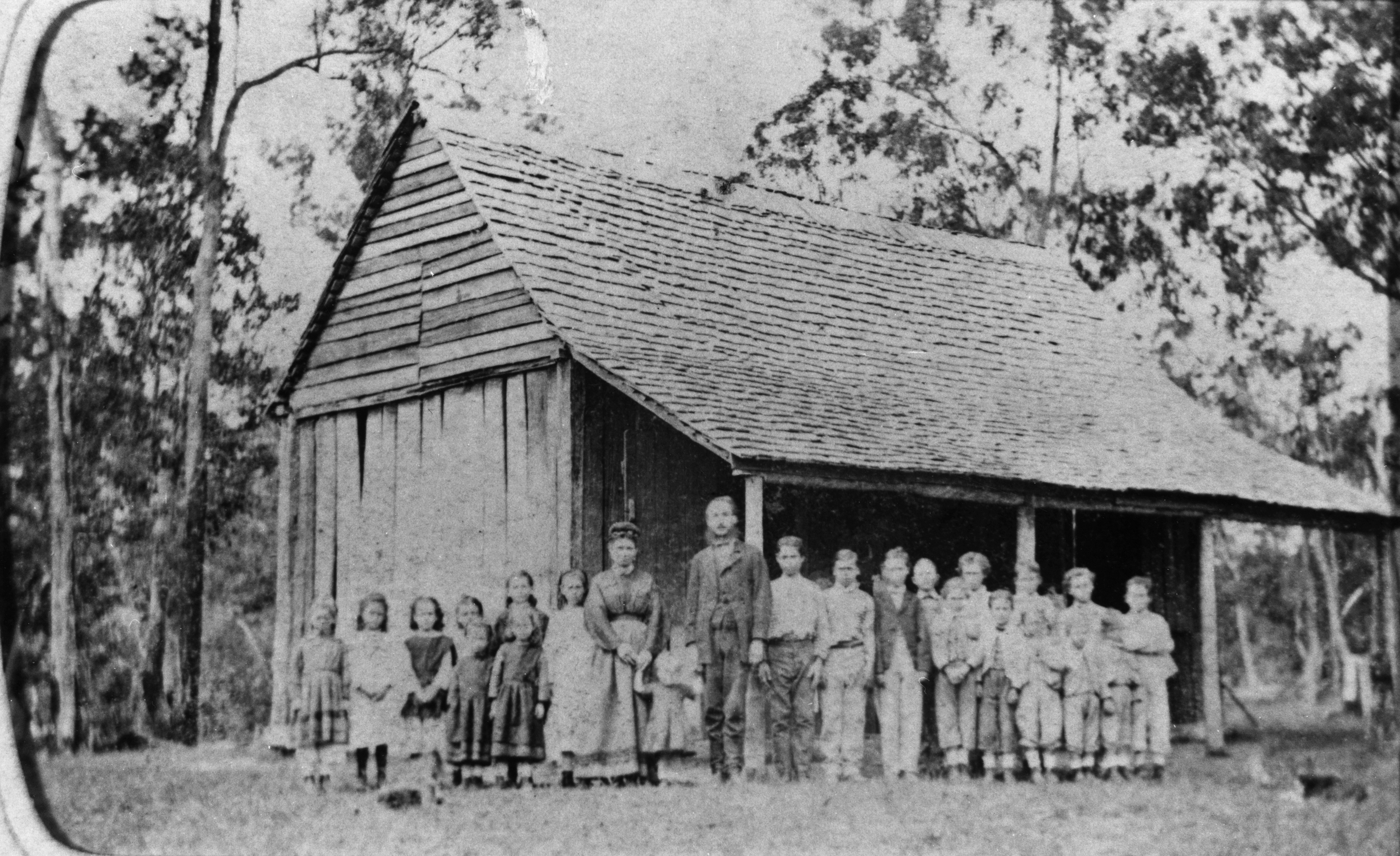
Samford State School, circa 1872

Samford Provisional School opened on 1 October 1872. In 1879, it became Samford State School.

In 1916, the Highlands Estate was advertised for private sale by Robinson & Jolly. A map of the estate indicates the land was five minutes from the Samford railway station on the Enoggera Terror's Creek Line (the Dayboro railway line), which was under construction at the time.

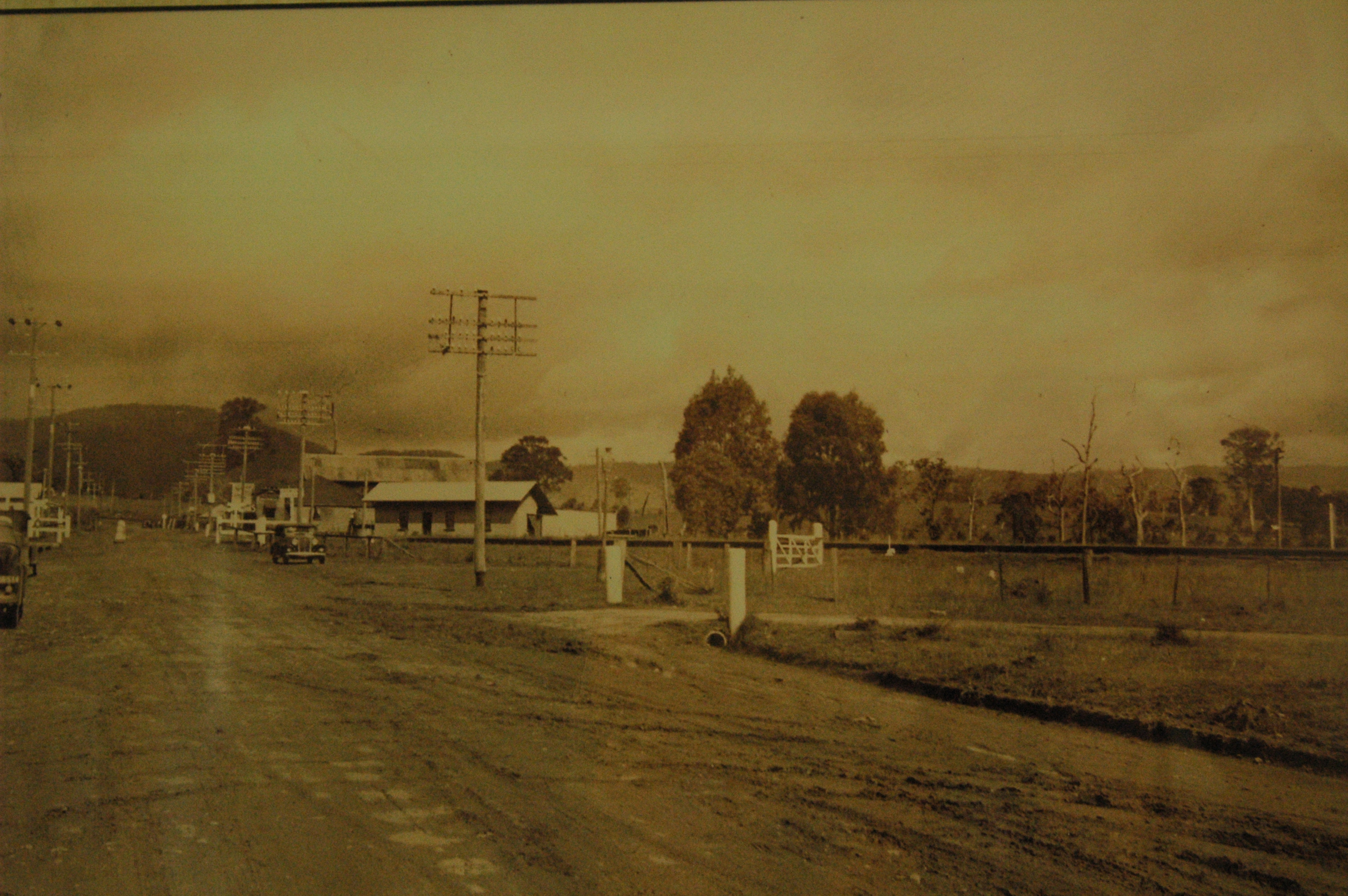
1920s view of Camp Mountain south west from Main Street. Note former rail crossing and railway station.

Buildings began to appear in Samford Village's Main Street in 1916. The first business to open in the Samford area was a shop and bakehouse which was owned and built by Alex Lawson.

The Samford railway station on the Dayboro line opened 1 July 1918; it reached its terminus at Dayboro railway station on 25 September 1920.

In 1919, the O'Hara's Hotel (the Samford Hotel) shifted to its current location. The location from which the hotel previously operated was purchased and used by the CSIRO. In the late 1950s, this hotel again changed its name from the Samford Railway Hotel to the Golden Valley Hotel.

By 1908, banana growing on the steep ridges at the foot of the ranges had become one of the most important industries in the Samford district. After World War 1, the government created additional small farms so that returned servicemen with limited capital were able to get started in the industry. During 1926 and 1927, more bananas were consigned to southern markets from Samford Railway Station than any other railway station in Queensland. However this success was short-lived. The banana bunchy top virus which had wiped out banana growing in the Northern Rivers region of New South Wales, spread to Samford and was the primary reason for the decline of the industry in the Pine Rivers Shire.

The CSIRO operated the Samford Research Station from the late 1950s to 2002. They experimented with growing tropical legumes and grasses and the impacts on grazing on these plants.

After the subdivision of farms into acreage homesites commenced in the 1960s, with substantial upgrading of road access completed more recently, many of Samford's residents commute to work in Brisbane.

In 2008, following local government amalgamations, the Shire of Pine Rivers (including Samford) became part of the Moreton Bay Region, later renamed City of Moreton Bay.

== Demographics ==
In 2001 census, the town of Samford had a population of 445 people.

In 2006 census, the town of Samford had a population of 656 people.

There has been no subsequent census reporting for the town of Samford, but census data is available for its two suburbs.

== Facilities ==
Looking onto CSIRO land at Samford

Samford Village contains a mix of historical buildings, restaurants, shops and services. Samford's heritage as a village servicing farming communities is apparent from the facilities which include an equipment hire business, hardware and produce stores, as well as banking, shopping, medical, chiropractic, fitness, legal and accounting.

A tourist attraction is the Samford Valley Historical Museum. Located in the heart of the village, John Scott Park is the frequent venue of community cultural activities such as free concerts and holiday celebrations. The park contains playground facilities for children and is a popular venue for weekend barbecues. The Slab Hut Gallery is an information centre and art gallery located in John Scott Park at the centre of town. There are several gift shops, restaurants and cafes, as well as a pub, in the immediate vicinity of John Scott Park.

In addition to the Samford Scout Group, the Scout Association of Queensland operates Baden Powell Park. Baden Powell Park consists of 56 hectares of natural bush land bordering the Brisbane Forest Park. Within the grounds are conference facilities, a commercial kitchen, accommodation blocks, camping ground, swimming pool, dam, abseiling tower as well as walking trails of various grades. The Baden-Powell Heritage Centre & Museum is open to scouting groups and to the general public on weekends.

The Moreton Bay City Council operates a mobile library service which visits John Scott Park on Station Street.

The Samford branch of the Queensland Country Women's Association meets at the QCWA Hall at 31 Main Street, Samford Village.

== Sports and activities ==
Some of the local sports played in and around town include swimming, horse riding, soccer, football, cricket, bridge jumping, netball, tennis, cliff diving, archery and lawn bowls. The Pine Rivers Shire Council, now part of the Moreton Bay City Council, acquired the former CSIRO land which is on the northern edge of the Village and comprises some 140 ha. The Council is planning a sport and recreation facility that will become a major resource for the residents of Samford Valley and the Moreton Bay region.

== Community ==
The Samford Support Network is a group of volunteers providing a variety of services to community members who are ill, elderly, living with a disability, or struggling.

== Education ==
Samford State School is a government primary (Prep-6) school for boys and girls at School Road (27.3765°S 152.8807°E). In 2018, the school had an enrolment of 850 students with 61 teachers (52 full-time equivalent) and 37 non-teaching staff (23 full-time equivalent). It includes a special education program.

There is no secondary school in Samford. The nearest government secondary school is Ferny Grove State High school in Ferny Grove to the south-east.
