= Toombul Shire Hall =

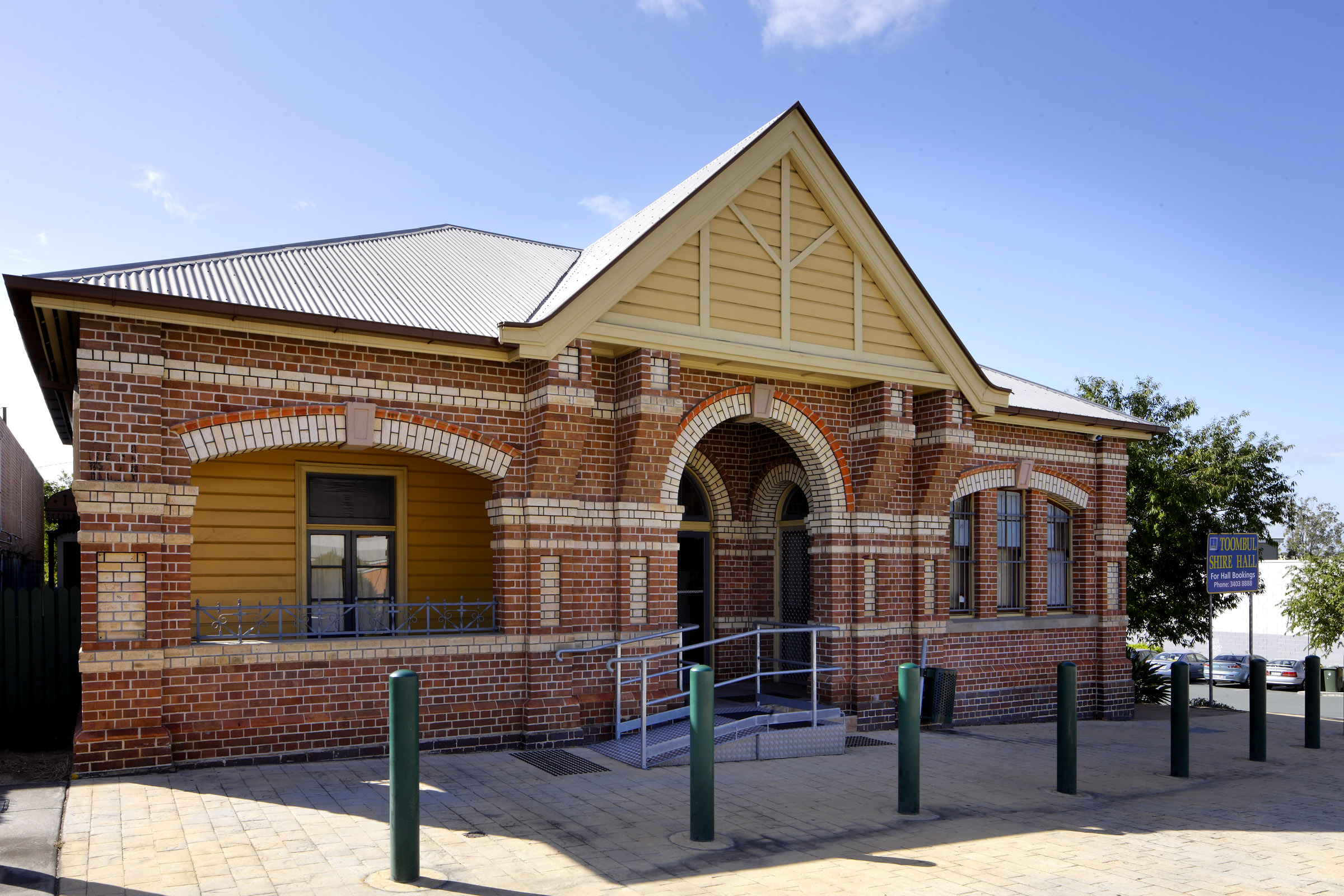
- Toombul Shire Hall, 2011

- Location within Queensland Location within Australia
- 27.405°S 153.0606°E
- Location: 1141 Sandgate Road, Nundah, City of Brisbane, Queensland, Australia

History
- Design period: 1870s–1890s (late 19th century)
- Built: 1891–1891

Site notes
- Architect: John Hall & Son
- Architectural style: Classicism

Queensland Heritage Register
- Official name: Toombul Shire Hall (former), Toombul Divisional Board Offices
- Type: state heritage (built)
- Designated: 21 October 1992
- Reference no.: 600272
- Significant period: early 1890s (fabric); 1890s–1920s (historical)
- Significant components: hall, office/s

Toombul Shire Hall is a heritage-listed town hall at 1141 Sandgate Road, Nundah, City of Brisbane, Queensland, Australia. It was designed by John Hall & Son and built from 1891 to 1891. It is also known as Toombul Divisional Board Offices. It was added to the Queensland Heritage Register on 21 October 1992.

== History ==
The former Toombul Shire Hall at Nundah was constructed in 1891 as a combination of municipal offices and public hall for the Toombul Divisional Board.

Construction of the 1891 building was made necessary following the 1890 separation of the Town of Hamilton from the Division of Toombul, which had been created under the Divisional Boards Act 1879. Following this split the Hamilton Town Council met at the Toombul Divisional Board's old offices at Breakfast Creek, and the Toombul Divisional Board rented premises at Nundah until they could afford the construction of new offices.

In mid-1891 Toombul Divisional Board approached architects John Hall and Son to design sketch plans for new divisional board offices. This architectural firm had designed the South Brisbane Town Hall, which was under construction. The Board agreed on 1 August 1891 that the architects be instructed to prepare plans for board offices, a hall and a clerk's residence, from amended sketch plans. It appears that the clerk's residence was located to the south of the offices and hall, on the Board's property, fronting Sandgate Road.

An application to the colonial treasury for a loan of £1400 was refused, but the Council went ahead with construction in late 1891, probably using day labour. By 2 January 1892 the Toombul Divisional Board was meeting in its new boardroom. Construction had strained the Board's budget, and by early 1892 the Board's bank account was overdrawn by £1460.

Rentals for use of the hall were set at 10 shillings per evening for religious services and 30 shillings per night for balls and functions.

Toombul Divisional Board became Toombul Shire Council in 1903, following the introduction of the Local Government Act 1902. Toombul Shire Hall remained the property of Toombul Shire Council, continuing to serve the local community as shire offices and public hall, until taken over by the Brisbane City Council following the creation of Greater Brisbane in 1925. Subsequently, the site was used as a works depot and the building as the regional health inspector's office and public hall.

In 1928 a skillion-roofed meeting room was added at the rear, side verandahs were attached to the hall and wing spaces were created on the stage.

In 1987–88 the Brisbane City Council undertook restorative and renovation work which included interior and exterior painting in heritage colours, repair and repointing of the exterior brickwork, re-roofing and recladding of the hall walls with galvanised corrugated iron, replacement of timbers in the pediment, and opening up of the northern verandah, which had been enclosed by this date.

The building continues to serve the local community as a popular function and meeting venue.

== Description ==
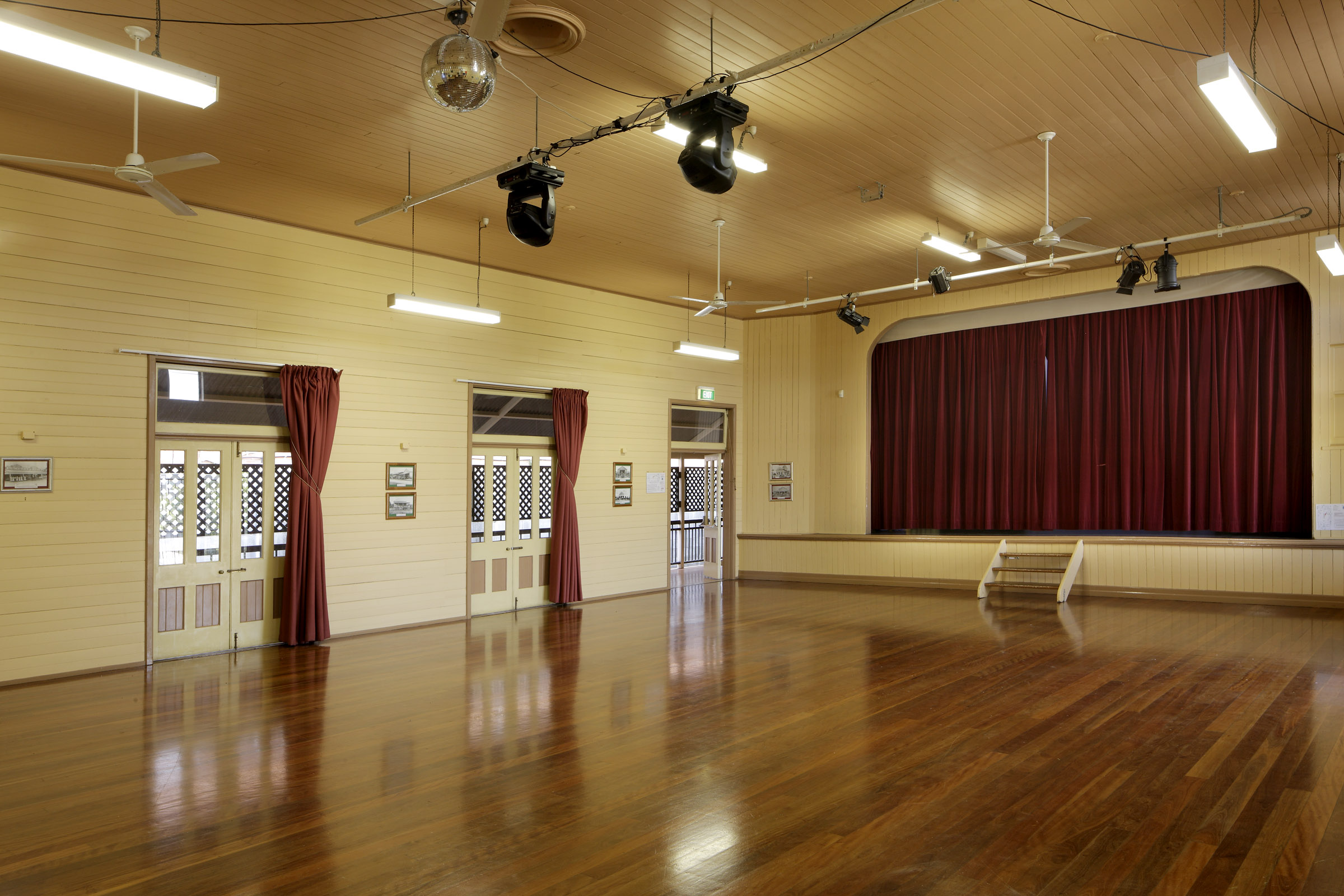
Interior view of the hall, 2011

The former Toombul Shire Hall is located flush to the pavement on Sandgate Road, a major arterial road to the northern suburbs and Bruce Highway.

It is a long, narrow building designed to combine the functions of municipal offices and public hall, with the offices at the front of the building sharing a central entrance and vestibule with the public hall behind. Verandahs run either side down the length of the hall, with brick-based and asbestos-clad toilet blocks attached to the southern verandah.

The building is timber-framed and incorporates a gradation in cladding fabric: a brick facade to Sandgate Road; chamferboard walls to the offices; and corrugated iron sheeting to the hall behind.

The classically styled facade of red brickwork with white strings and arches features a central round-arched portico with low-arched openings on either side, forming a brick balustraded verandah to the left, and an office to the right. A front ramp for wheelchair access is a recent addition.

At the front the building rests on shallow brick foundations, but as the land slopes away towards the rear these are replaced by timber stumps.

Above the public hall is a long gabled roof of corrugated iron with tall galvanised ventilators along the crown.

The office section has a hipped roof, also iron covered, with a steeply pitched pediment over the entrance portico. The pediment is infilled with imitation half-timbering.

The site includes a sizeable area of land to the rear which has been utilised as a works depot housing a number of sheds and equipment. The ground facing Sandgate Road to the south of the hall has been asphalted and fenced with wire mesh. There are no visible remains of any landscaping.

== Heritage listing ==
Toombul Shire Hall (former) was listed on the Queensland Heritage Register on 21 October 1992 having satisfied the following criteria.

The place is important in demonstrating the evolution or pattern of Queensland's history.

The former Toombul Shire Hall, erected in 1891, is significant historically for its association with the work of the Toombul Divisional Board and Toombul Shire Council for over 3 decades, and is significant as a late 19th century expression of local authority status within a Queensland community.

The place demonstrates rare, uncommon or endangered aspects of Queensland's cultural heritage.

It is the only surviving, non-masonry shire hall retained by the Brisbane City Council.

The place is important in demonstrating the principal characteristics of a particular class of cultural places.

The building remains substantially intact, and is an excellent example of 19th century, timber-framed, municipal hall construction in Queensland. The gradation in materials from brick facade to timber-clad front offices to galvanised iron hall, remains an evocative illustration of the tight financial budgets under which most Queensland divisional boards operated.

The place is important because of its aesthetic significance.

The place is important for its landmark quality and aesthetic and historic contribution to the Nundah townscape.

The place has a special association with the life or work of a particular person, group or organisation of importance in Queensland's history.

The former Toombul Shire Hall, erected in 1891, is significant historically for its association with the work of the Toombul Divisional Board and Toombul Shire Council for over 3 decades, and is significant as a late 19th century expression of local authority status within a Queensland community.
