= Nundah railway station =

Railway station in Queensland, Australia

Nundah
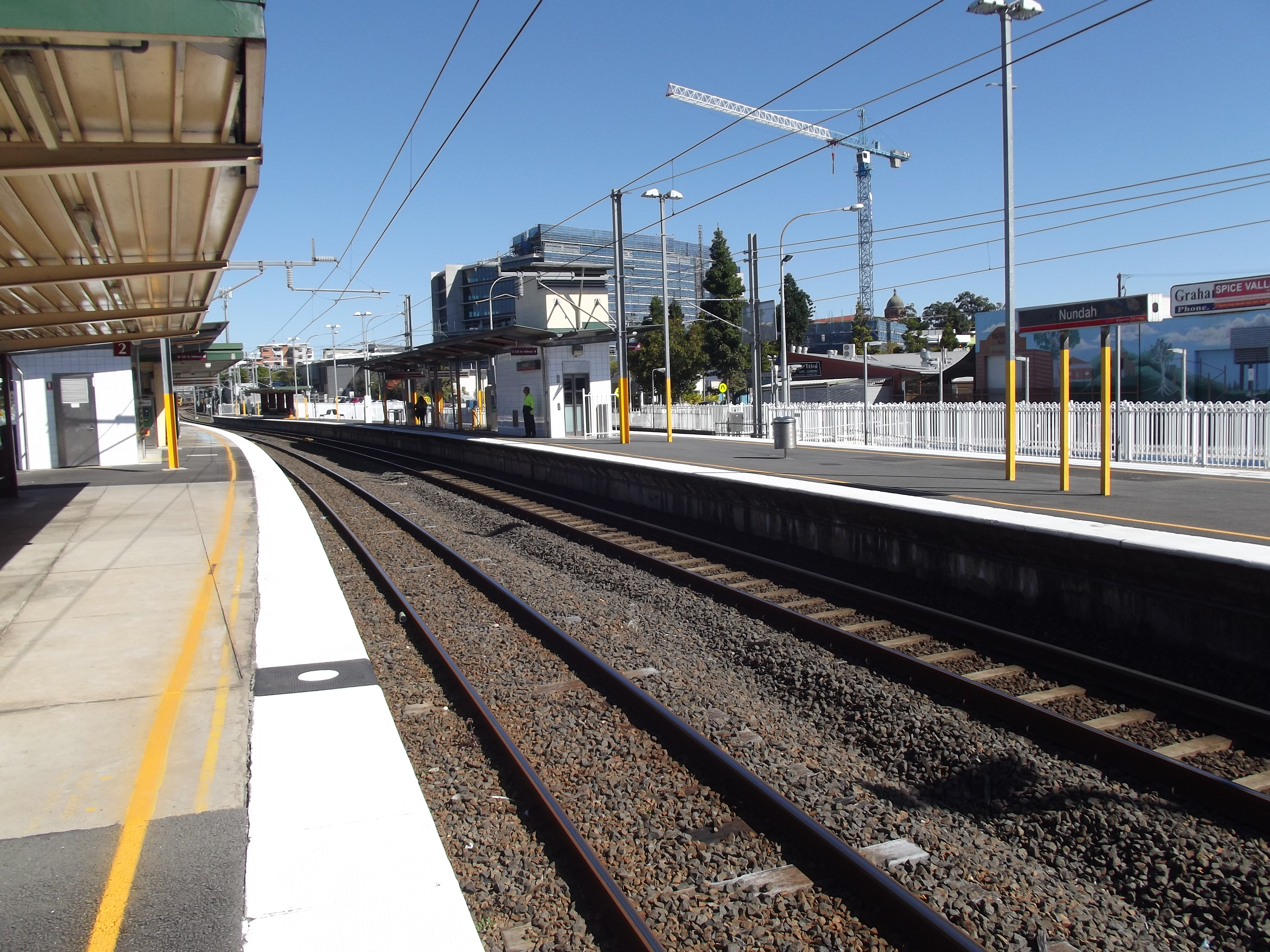
- Southbound view from Platform 3 in August 2012

General information
- Location: Station Street, Nundah
- Coordinates: 27.4009°S 153.0621°E
- Owner: Queensland Rail
- Operator: Queensland Rail
- Line: T4 Shorncliffe
- Distance: 8.71 kilometres from Central
- Platforms: 4 (2 island)

Construction
- Structure type: Ground
- Parking: 176 bays

Other information
- Status: Staffed
- Station code: 600403 (platform 1); 600404 (platform 2); 600405 (platform 3); 600406 (platform 4)
- Fare zone: Zone 2
- Website: Queensland Rail

History
- Opened: 1882
- Rebuilt: 1960
- Former names: German

Services
Preceding station	Queensland Rail	Following station
Toombul towards Cleveland via Roma Street	T4 Shorncliffe line	Northgate towards Shorncliffe
Location

Nundah is a railway station operated by Queensland Rail on the Shorncliffe line. It opened in 1882 and serves the Brisbane suburb of Nundah. It is a ground level station, featuring two island platforms with four faces.

Nundah station opened in 1882 as German station, before being renamed to Nundah within six weeks of opening. The station was rebuilt in 1960. On 29 November 1999, two extra platforms opened as part of the quadruplication of the line from Bowen Hills to Northgate.

== Services ==
Nundah station is served daily by all stops Citytrain network services from Shorncliffe to Central, many continuing to Boggo Road, Cannon Hill, Manly and Cleveland. Also see Inner City timetable

== Platforms and services ==
Nundah platform arrangement
Platform	Line	Destination	Notes
1	T4 Shorncliffe	Roma Street (to Cleveland line)	
2	T4 Shorncliffe	Shorncliffe	
3	No scheduled services		
4	No scheduled services		
