= Nundah =

- Suburb
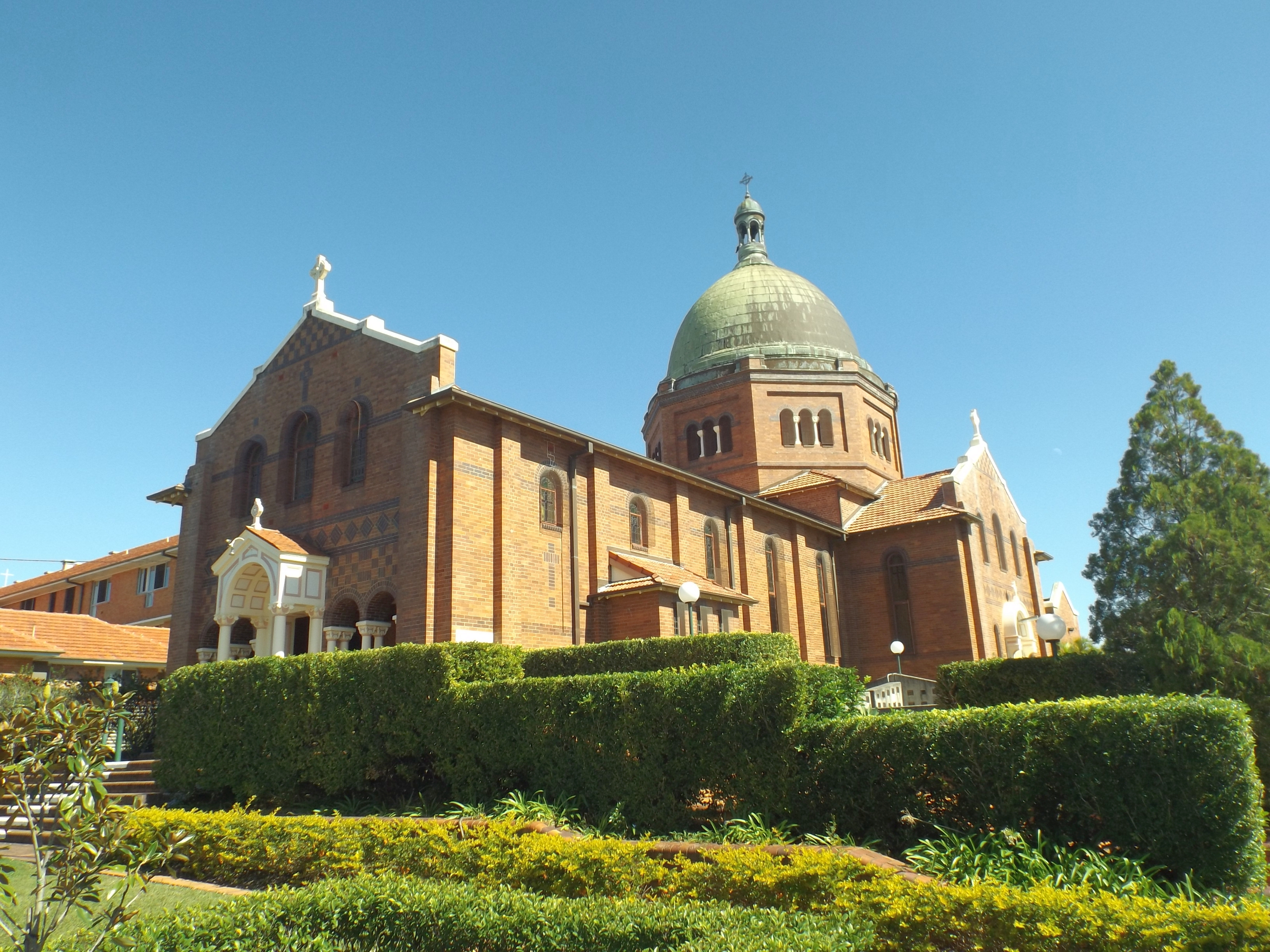
- The Corpus Christi Church at Nundah

- Interactive map of Nundah
- Coordinates: 27.4025°S 153.0636°E
- Country: Australia
- State: Queensland
- City: Brisbane
- LGA: City of Brisbane (Hamilton Ward and Northgate Ward)
- Location: 8.9 km (5.5 mi) NNE of Brisbane CBD

Government
  - State electorate: Nudgee
  - Federal division: Lilley

Area
  - Total: 3.9 km^{2} (1.5 sq mi)
- Elevation: 10 m (33 ft)

Population
  - Total: 13,098 (2021 census)
  - Density: 3,360/km^{2} (8,700/sq mi)
- Time zone: UTC+10:00 (AEST)
- Postcode: 4012
Suburbs around Nundah
Wavell Heights	Virginia	Northgate
Wavell Heights	Nundah	Brisbane Airport
Kalinga	Clayfield	Hendra

Nundah (previously called German Station) is an inner suburb in the City of Brisbane, Queensland, Australia. It contains the neighbourhood of Toombul. In the 2021 census, Nundah had a population of 13,098 people.

Prior to European settlement, Nundah was inhabited by Aboriginal people from the Turrbul tribe. Nundah is primarily a residential suburb, which straddles Sandgate Road, one of the major arterial roads of Brisbane's north. It was first settled by Europeans in the mid-19th century, although the suburb remained primarily a rural area until it was connected to Brisbane via railway in the 1880s. Originally considered a working-class suburb, the area has become gentrified in recent years, and today features a mix of traditional worker's cottages and modern high-density apartment blocks. It is close to the Centro Shopping Centre.

== Geography ==
Nundah is a mixed-density residential suburb, with some light industry and a commercial retail area concentrated on Sandgate Road. It is adjacent to the suburbs of Clayfield, Northgate and Wavell Heights, and is dominated by a large ridge that runs from the northwest to the southeast. The "Nundah Village" shopping district and Nundah State School are on this ridge, while the George Bridges Tunnel bisects it along Sandgate Road.

The North Coast railway line passes through the suburb entering from Clayfield to the south and exiting to Northgate to the north. The suburb is served by two stations:

- Toombul railway station in the south of the suburb (27.4077°S 153.0588°E).
- Nundah railway station in the north of the suburb (27.4007°S 153.0620°E).

The suburb includes the locality and formerly distinct suburb of Toombul, which is centred in the south of Nundah, around Sandgate Road. Various facilities in Nundah are named after this locality, including Toombul Shopping Centre, Toombul bus interchange and Toombul railway station.

Schulz Canal runs through Nundah, bisecting the Toombul Shopping Centre Carpark. The low elevation of the carpark makes it particularly susceptible to flash flooding during peak storm seasons – often claiming the cars of unwary shoppers inside the centre and those attempting to cross the Melton Road bridge. The estuary of the canal is a moderately popular recreational fishing spot.

Zion Hill is at (27.4054°S 153.0681°E), and was named after Zion (Jerusalem) by the German Moravian missionaries of 1838.

== History ==
=== Aboriginal history ===
Like most of Northern Brisbane, the area around Nundah was dominated by the Turrbul tribe. Their traditional coastal trade route passed through Nundah, near the modern-day Hedley Avenue. There are also many significant Aboriginal sites near Nundah, such as Dinah Island, which was reportedly the site of the last traditional Aboriginal burial in the Brisbane area. There were a number of bora rings in the area, indicating that the Nundah area was densely populated by Aboriginal people before European settlers arrived.

=== European settlement ===
==== German mission ====
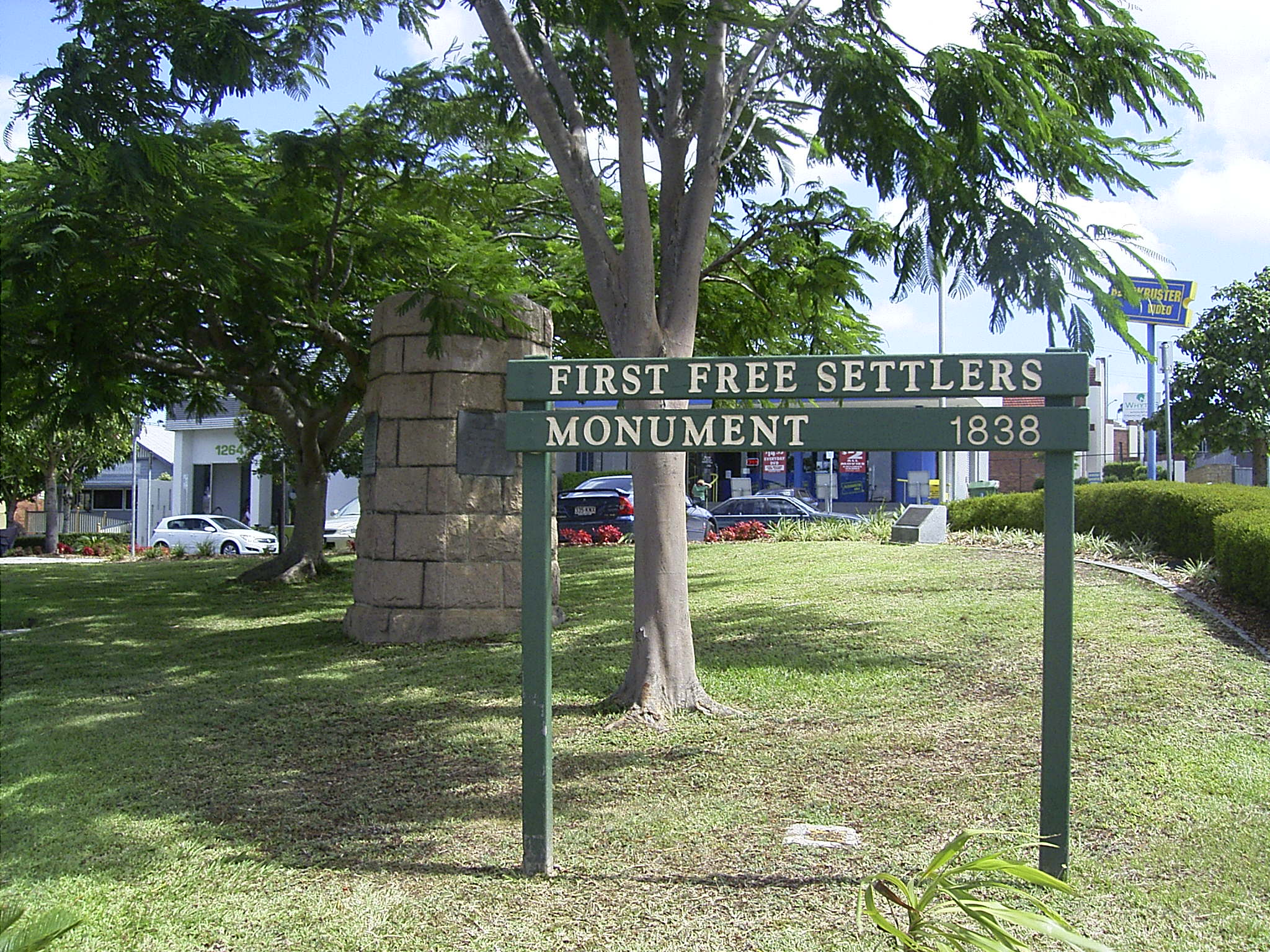
Memorial to the German Missionaries erected in 1938 for the area's centennial

The first permanent European settlement in the area was a mission built in 1838 by German Moravian missionaries, under the guidance of Reverend Carl Wilhelm Schmidt and later Reverend Christoph Eipper with the aim of bringing Christianity to the local Aboriginal people. They first called the area "Zion", and the mission was located in the vicinity of the modern-day street "Walkers Way". It later became "German Station". The explorer Dr. Ludwig Leichhardt visited the area in 1843, and spoke very highly of the mission, but despite this the mission met with limited success and was closed at the behest of the colonial government in 1846. This first settlement is nonetheless commemorated with a monument at the corner of Sandgate Road and Wood Street unveiled in 1938 by the then Premier of Queensland William Forgan Smith. The names of these German settlers can be seen in the names of streets in Nundah and surrounding suburbs such as Rode Road and Gerler Road.

==== Growth of the village of German Station ====
A prominent local citizen who contributed significantly to the development of the village of German Station was George Bridges (1820–1898). George and his young family immigrated from Wilstead, Bedfordshire, England to Queensland in 1852 aboard the "Marie Somes". In 1855, he acquired 64 acres (26 ha) of land north of Buckland Road and east of Sandgate Road for farming. However, as Sandgate became an increasingly popular holiday destination, the increasing volume of coach traffic along Sandgate Road encouraged him to open a hotel in 1866, which became a popular stop being roughly halfway between Brisbane and Sandgate. The first hotel was called the Kedron Hotel but the third and longest-running hotel was known as the Kedron Brook Hotel and was located alongside Sandgate Road (now Bage Street, named after Freda Bage, first principal of The Women's College, University of Queensland) on the SW corner of his property. Emboldened by the success of his hotel ventures, George Bridges looked for other commercial opportunities. He observed that Sandgate Road at that time did a dog-leg around the SW corner of his property (along Buckland Road) which forced traffic to travel up and over Donkin's Hill. So he created a short-cut across the SW corner of his property that avoided the hill, which was much appreciated by the travellers, allowing George Bridges to sell off parcels of land along this new unofficial piece of Sandgate Road to commercial enterprises, which serviced both the travellers and the local farming community. This unofficial short-cut grew into the Nundah Village shopping street that exists today and eventually became the official route of Sandgate Road. Around 1872, George and his wife Mary retired to Burpengary and began to progressively sell off the land of their German Station property as the village developed.

Architectural plans for school and teachers residences at German Station, circa 1880

==== Creation of the suburb of Nundah ====
A call for tenders for a non-denominational chapel in German Station was advertised in July 1855 . The chapel was open for Christian services on Thursday 6 December 1855. About February 1859 the chapel was acquired by the Baptists; the Wesleyans had first right of refusal but did not purchase it. The Baptists held their opening services on Sunday 20 February 1859. In 1874 it was relocated to Hendra to become the Baptist Church there, as many Baptists in Nundah had moved to the Hendra area.

On Sunday 24 April 1859, the Wesleyan congregation opened their recently erected chapel.

German Station State School opened on 2 October 1865 and was renamed Nundah State School in 1895.

German Station remained an agricultural area until the 1880s. In 1881, Queensland State Government purchased a strip of land across George Bridges's property to build a railway link between Brisbane and Sandgate. The railway opened in 1882 and resulted in a suburban residential construction boom on Brisbane's northside. This urban sprawl was also encouraged by the Undue Subdivision of Land Prevention Act 1885, which mandated minimum lot sizes for new urban developments. The village of German Station became known as a location where working-class families could obtain cheap housing on reasonably sized lots not too far from the city. George Bridges sold off his remaining land for residential development in the new suburb.

A railway station called German was created in 1882 (again on land originally owned by George Bridges), because they wanted the station to be called German Station rather than German Station Station. However, six weeks after the railway station opened, it was renamed Nundah. The name Nundah is a corruption of the Yuggera language, Turrbal dialect word nanda meaning chain of water holes. This name is probably a reference to the nearby natural water sources at Kedron Brook and the marshy areas formerly to the east of the suburb. In 1888, the name of the Post Office was also changed to Nundah, signalling the renaming of the new suburb. However, the name German Station persisted for many years. For many years it was common to find references to Nundah with the annotation "formerly German Station" in newspapers and advertisements, until the name Nundah was well established.

In 1883, William Alexander Jenyns Boyd relocated his Eton Preparatory School from Milton (where it was established in 1877) to Nundah, where he erected new buildings at a cost of £3,000 on a 10-acre (4.0 ha) site. In 1889 Boyd was forced to close the school due to economic hardships preventing families being able to afford to send their sons to boarding school, but he re-opened the school in 1891. However the impacts of the 1893 Brisbane flood forced him to close the school permanently. In June 1893 the Sisters of the Society of the Sacred Advent acquired Eton House to run a boarding school for orphan girls called The Home of the Good Shepherd, which in 1894 also took in paying students as well with Miss Isabelle Caine as headmistress under the management of Sister Emma. In 1897 the orphans were relocated to Ormiston Place, leaving Eton House as a private boarding school known as the Eton High School for Girls. In 1907, the school relocated to Toorak House in Hamilton and then in 1910 to Albion Heights (now Ascot) where it is known as St Margaret's Anglican Girls' School. In 1907 the St Francis Anglican Theological College moved into Eton House under Canon Tomlin. In 1936-7 the theological college relocated to Bishopsbourne in Milton. By June 1937, Eton House had been sold for removal and its grounds subdivided, but the site is believed to be bounded by Bishop Street, Buckland Road, Wand Street and Olive Street (27.4010°S 153.0524°E). Boyd Road leads to this area and presumably commemorates Boyd who established the site.

In 1889, the Baptist church building at Fortescue Street in Spring Hill (built in 1876) was relocated to Nundah (now 19 Chapel Street, 27.4025°S 153.0594°E). The Nundah Baptist Church officially opened on Sunday 9 June 1889. The church building is still extant, although modified and no longer owned by the Baptist church; one of its subsequent uses was as the Anglican Church of the Resurrection.

From 1890, Nundah was the seat of the Shire of Toombul, which was absorbed into the City of Greater Brisbane in 1925. The Toombul Shire Hall still exists as a community centre.

In 1900, Laura Tufnell, the widow of Edward Tufnell (a former Anglican Bishop of Brisbane), donated money to establish an orphanage in her husband's name. The funds were used to purchase 4.5 acres (1.8 ha) of land at 230 Buckland Road (27.4027°S 153.0526°E). Tufnell Home was established by the Anglican Diocese of Brisbane and operated by the Sisters of the Sacred Advent. It opened on 6 February 1901 and closed in 1993.

In 1909, Surrey Street in Nundah became the site of the first public housing dwelling in Queensland. In the early twentieth century, Nundah became a major suburban centre, due to its location on Sandgate Road, one of Brisbane's busiest arterial roads, and the adjacent Nundah railway station. Sandgate Road and nearby streets were lined with shops, pubs, cinemas and other commercial premises.

St Joseph's Convent and School was dedicated and opened on Sunday 16 January 1916 by James Duhig, Roman Catholic Archbishop of Brisbane. The site consisting of Marston House and 3 acres (1.2 ha) of land was donated by Harry Donkin. The Sisters of St Joseph of the Sacred Heart came from Sydney the previous week to operate the school. It heralded the welcome return of the order to Brisbane after an absence of 36 years after Archbishop James O'Quinn directed the order to leave his diocese in 1879 following disputes with Mary MacKillop over control of the schools operated by the Sisters.

The Shire of Toombul War Memorial was dedicated by the Governor of Queensland, Matthew Nathan, on 12 November 1921. The memorial commemorates who served in World War I. It is located in Nundah Memorial Park (then known as Buckland Park, 27.402890°S 153.058696°E).

Nundah Memorial Baptist Church opened in 1923. Construction commenced in April 1923 with a stump-capping ceremony on Saturday 14 April 1923. It was officially opened on Saturday 4 August 1923. It has five memorial windows commemorating soldiers who died in World War I. It was built to the west of the 1889 church.

In November and December 1923, '10 Choice Allotments', were advertised as "Wheeler Estate", to be auctioned by Isles, Love & Co. Limited Auctioneers on 1 December 1923. This estate was bounded by Sandgate Road to the west, by London Street to the east, and Northgate Road to the north.

In 1926, George Walker suggested a monument be built to mark the beginnings of Nundah, which was unveiled by the Queensland Governor Sir Leslie Orme Wilson on 23 April 1938 as part of the First Free Settlers' Centenary Celebrations. This First Free Settlers Monument is listed in the Queensland Heritage Register.

On Saturday 5 June 1937, College Estate residential subdivision was advertised for public auction by Cameron Brothers auctioneers. It was described as "54 splendid residential sites occupying one of the finest positions in Nundah".

Mount St Joseph's Boarding & Day School for girls opened in 1953. It was operated by Sisters of St Joseph of the Sacred Heart. In 1964 it was renamed Corpus Christi College. In 2009, it was renamed Mary McKillop College to commemorate the 100th anniversary of her death and her canonisation.

St. George's Anglican Mission Hall in Toombul was dedicated on 11 April 1953 by Archbishop Reginald Halse. Its closure on 28 June 1987 was approved by Assistant Bishop George Browning.

Nundah Infants State School opened on 24 January 1955, but closed on 3 May 1974, when it was re-integrated into Nundah State School.

Northgate State School opened on 27 January 1959.

On 11 October 1967, Toombul shopping centre was opened at 1015 Sandgate Road by Westfield. As there were concerns that the site was floodprone, the site was filled and raised to make it higher. The centre has been modified and extended over the years. It was the largest shopping centre of the north side of Brisbane until 1999-2000 when it was overtaken by Westfield Chermside's redevelopment. In July 2003, Centro Properties Group bought the centre. In May 2016, Mirvac bought the centre.

Nundah's commercial precinct suffered a precipitous decline from the 1970s with the construction of Toombul shopping centre. Increasing motor traffic along Sandgate Road also reduced Nundah's appeal as a shopping precinct as it was difficult to park. Gradually many shops closed, and those that opened in their place were often "low-class" establishments such as pawn brokers, charity stores etc. that were unappealing to most shoppers, driving them increasingly to shop at Toombul.

==== Renewal of Nundah ====
In 2001, the Nundah Bypass Tunnel was constructed under nearby Bage Street, diverting through traffic away from the suburban centre. There was considerable public support to name the road tunnel after George Bridges in recognition of his contribution to the development of the district and the fact that the tunnel was located on his original landholding. In 2009 as part of Queensland's 150th Birthday Celebrations, the Nundah Bypass Tunnel was renamed "George Bridges Tunnel".

In 1999, the construction of the tunnel required the demolition of the 1923 Baptist Church on the corner of Bage and Chapel Street. In 2005 the North-East Baptist Church was built approximately on the site of the 1923 Nundah Memorial Baptist Church, adjacent to the 1889 former Baptist Church. The naming of the 2005 church as "North-East" reflects the amalgamation of the Nundah and Wavell Heights Baptist congregations.

In 2008 the Brisbane City Council suburban renewal programme has seen new art installations, cafés and commercial enterprises open in Nundah, creating a village-like atmosphere along the now-quiet Sandgate Road. The suburb has now become popular among white collar workers seeking relatively inexpensive housing and apartments only a moderate distance from the Brisbane CBD. Since then, along with the rest of the city, housing prices in the area have skyrocketed, pricing most of the traditional working class out of the suburb.

In the 2016 census, the population of Nundah was 12,141. Of these 50.5% were female and 49.5% male. The median age of the Nundah population was 33 years of age, 5 years below the Australian median. 63.1% of people living in Nundah were born in Australia, compared to the national average of 66.7%; the next most common countries of birth were India 5.9%, New Zealand 4.5%, England 3.2%, Philippines 1.4% and Nepal 1.3%. 72.7% of people spoke only English at home; the next most common languages were Punjabi 2.2%, Hindi 1.6%, Nepali 1.3%, Mandarin 1.3% and Spanish 1.0%.

Toombul Shopping Centre was damaged in the 2022 Brisbane flood. In May 2022, it was announced that the centre would not be reopening.

After the devastating floods of 2022, the Toombul Shopping Centre is undergoing a major transformation. The demolition work of the building was officially started in late 2023.

== Demographics ==
In the 2016 census, Nundah had a population of 12,141 people. 63.1% of people were born in Australia. The most common countries of birth were India 5.9%, New Zealand 4.5%, England 3.2%, Philippines 1.4% and Nepal 1.3%.

In the 2021 census, Nundah had a population of 13,098 people.

== Heritage listings ==
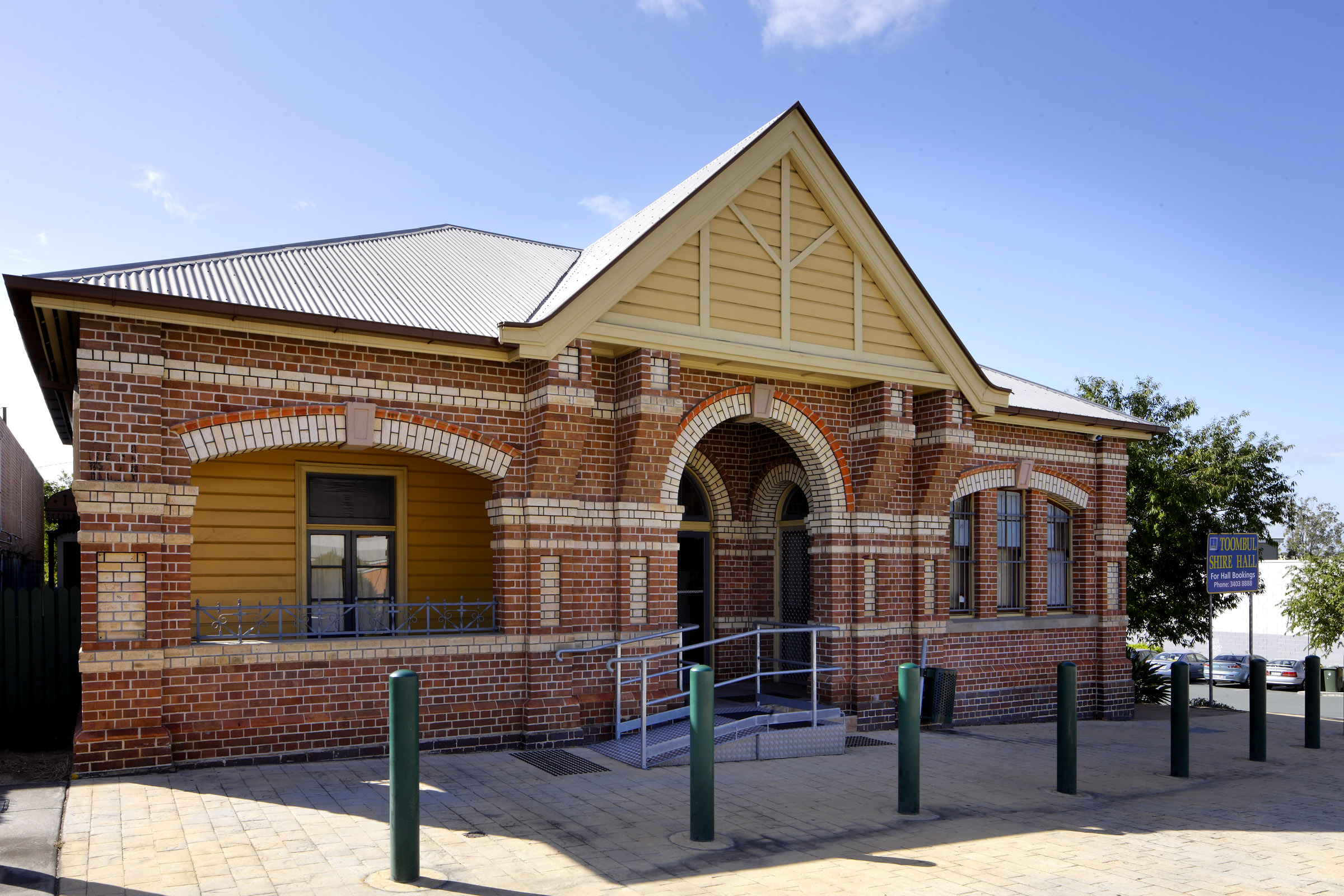
The Toombul Shire Hall is a heritage-listed building in Nundah.

Nundah has a number of heritage-listed sites, including:

- Nundah State School, 41 Bage Street
- Nundah Memorial Hall, 11 Boyd Road
- former Salvation Army Hall, 11 Boyd Street
- Victoria-era cottage, 12 Boyd Street
- former PMG Telephone Exchange, 99 Buckland Road
- Nundah Memorial Park (includes Nundah War Memorial), 133 Buckland Road
- Corpus Christi Catholic Church, 136 Buckland Road
- former Tufnell Home Orphanage Chapel, 230 Buckland Road
- Nundah Baby Clinic, 10 Chapel Street
- Spanish Mission-style house, 33 Eton Street
- Nundah Cemetery, contains the graves of many of the original settlers and their families, 88 Hedley Avenue
- Wagner Farmhouse, 95 Hows Road (27.4075°S 153.0662°E)
- Church of the Holy Spirit, 39 Imbros Street
- Oxenham Park, 134 Melton Road
- Nundah Substation No. 237, 32 Robinson Road
- Toombul Shire Hall, 1141 Sandgate Road
- former Henry Thomas Chemist Building, 1192 Sandgate Road
- Masonry shops and flats, 1252 Sandgate Road
- Royal Hotel, 1259 Sandgate Road
- First Free Settlers Monument, opposite 1270 Sandgate Road (27.4010°S 153.0590°E)
- former Imperial Cafe (also known as St Vincent de Paul Centre), 1279 Sandgate Road
- Nundah Air Raid Shelter, Opposite 1341 Sandgate Road (27.4010°S 153.0594°E)
- Spanish Mission-style house, 1359 Sandgate Road
- Cadogan House (also known as Nundah Private Hospital), 1382 Sandgate Road
- Workers' Dwelling No.1, 35 Surrey Street
- Nundah Fire Station, 9 Union Street
- Primrosa (Federation-era house), 78 York Street

== Education ==
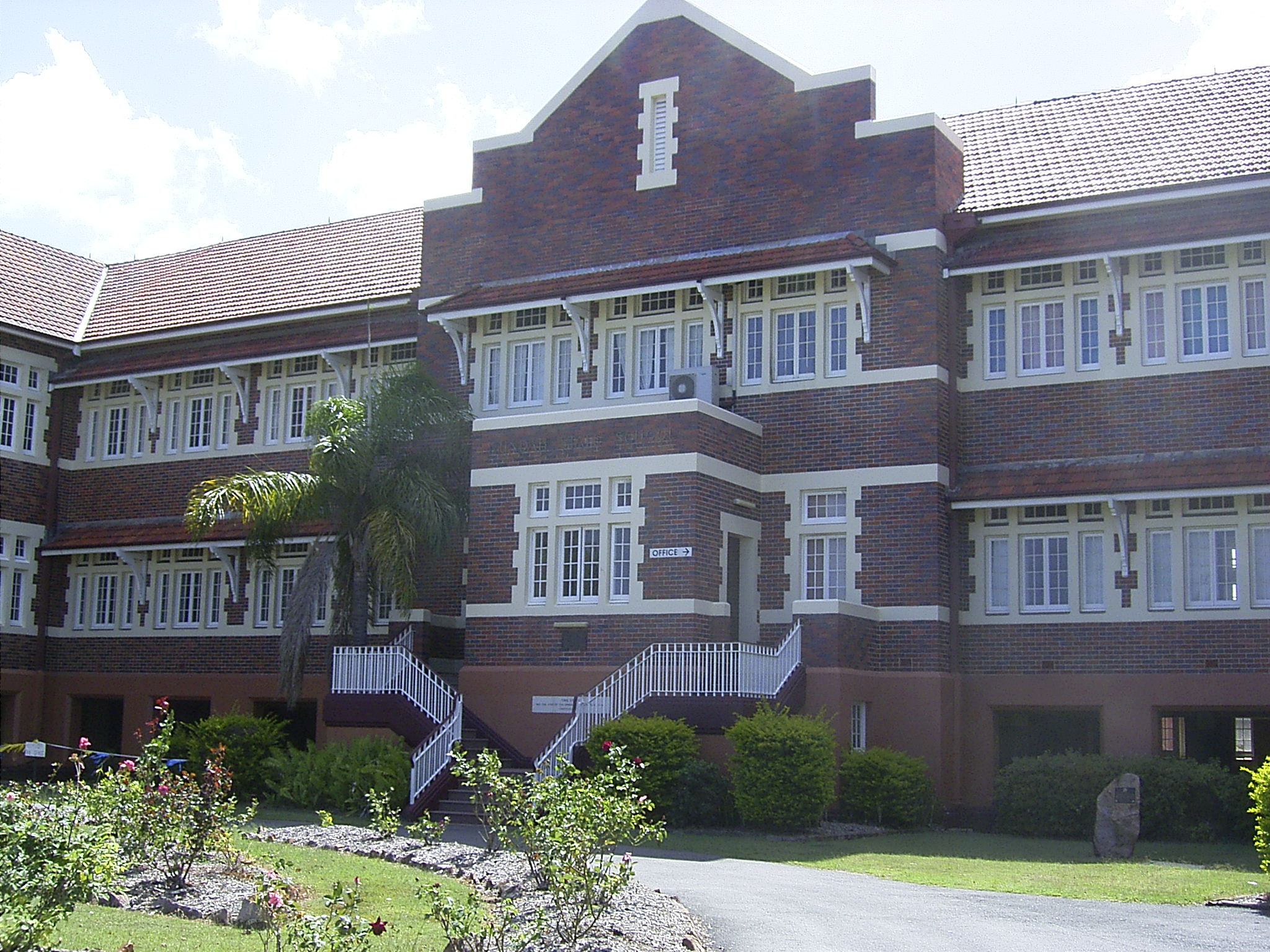
Nundah State School

Nundah State School is a government primary (Prep–6) school for boys and girls at 41 Bage Street (27.4025°S 153.0583°E). In 2017, the school had an enrolment of 714 students with 48 teachers (42 full-time equivalent) and 25 non-teaching staff (14 full-time equivalent). It includes a special education program.

Northgate State School is a government primary (Prep–6) school for boys and girls at 128 Amelia Street (27.3987°S 153.0708°E) in eastern Nundah. In 2018, the school had an enrolment of 291 students with 26 teachers (18 full-time equivalent) and 15 non-teaching staff (9 full-time equivalent).

St Joseph's School is a Catholic primary (Prep–6) school for boys and girls at 16 Leslie Street (27.4038°S 153.0568°E). In 2017, the school had an enrolment of 190 students with 20 teachers (13 full-time equivalent) and 13 non-teaching staff (6 full-time equivalent).

Mary MacKillop College is a Catholic secondary (7–12) school for girls at 60 Bage Street (27.4038°S 153.0584°E). In 2017, the school had an enrolment of 524 students with 40 teachers (39 full-time equivalent) and 18 non-teaching staff (15 full-time equivalent). It was formerly known as Corpus Christi College.

There are no government secondary schools in Nundah. The nearest government secondary schools are Aviation High in Hendra and Wavell State High School in Wavell Heights.

Help Employment & Training at 1176 Sandgate Road provides training for people with disabilities and assists with finding jobs.

== Amenities ==
=== Shopping ===
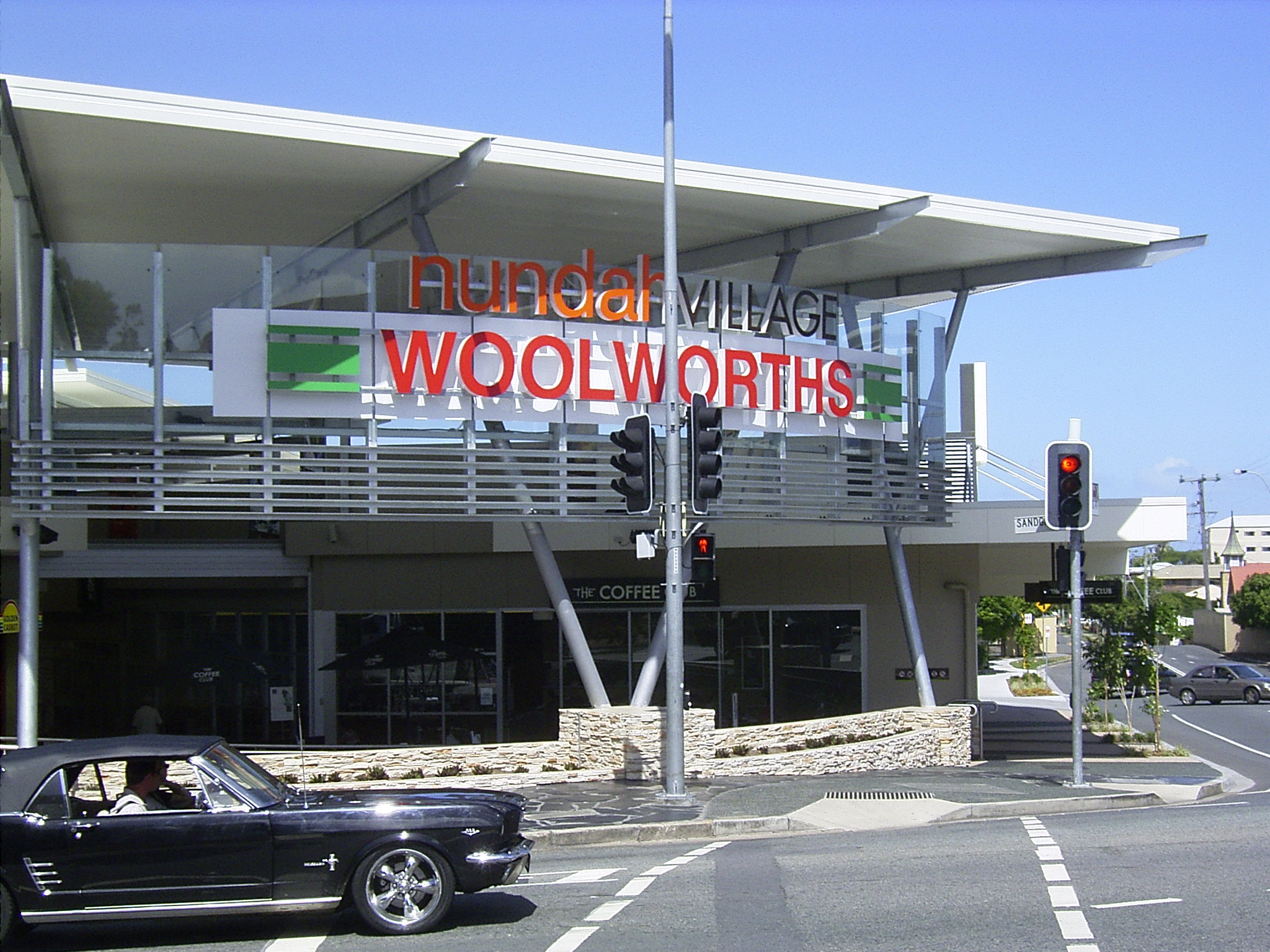
Nundah Village shopping centre

Nundah retails a traditional "shopping strip" commercial district, centred mainly along the section of Sandgate Road that has been bypassed by the Nundah Bypass. There are plenty of cafes and speciality shops, as well as some medical facilities.

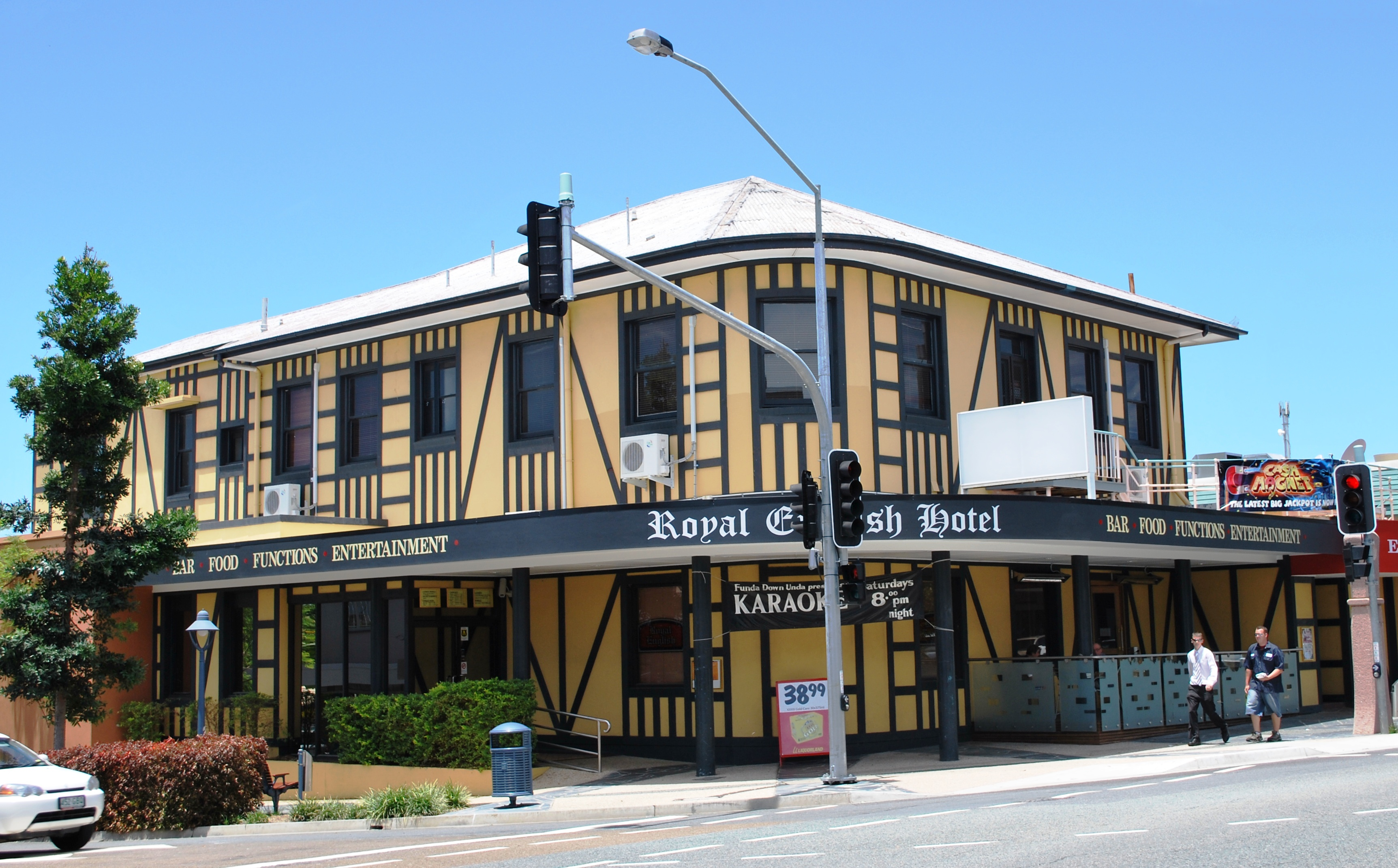
The Royal English Hotel

=== Churches ===
Since the earliest days of the Zion's Hill mission, there have been a number of churches in the area. The Lutheran church continues to maintain a presence in the suburb, with a number of facilities, including St Paul's church, a childcare centre, and the Zion Retirement home clustered around the area near the corner of Buckland Road and Atthow Parade.

Other denominations also have a presence in the area, including the Catholic Church which has a combined church and girls' school on Bage Street. The Presbyterian, Baptist, Uniting and Anglican churches also have places of worship located within the suburb. Jehovah's Witnesses have a Kingdom Hall in the suburb, which is attended by both the Nundah and Clayfield congregations. Historically, the Methodist church and the Salvation Army also maintained churches in the area, although these are no longer active.

=== Cultural facilities ===
The current Nundah Public Library opened in 1968 and had a major refurbishment in 2016. Nundah public library is at 1 Bage Street (accessed via Primrose Lane). It is operated by the Brisbane City Council.

Sir William Knox Archives & Resource Centre is behind the Nundah Public Library.

=== Sport ===
The Toombul District Cricket Club is directly across Duke Street from Nundah railway station. It covers 3.5 hectares, and is bordered by York Street, Duke Street, Melton Road and Jenner Street. The club was founded in 1882, and has been based at Oxenham Park in the heart of Nundah since 1906.

Bishop Park is the home ground of the Norths Devils rugby league team in the Queensland Cup competition.

Oxenham Park is the home of the Toombul District Cricket Club in the Queensland Cricket Association Grade competition, and contains the Ken MacKay and LaFrantz Ovals.

Nundah Criterium Bicycle Track is in Hedley Avenue and Walkers Way, next to Albert Bishop Park and the Schultz Canal bikeway.

Ross Park has BMX and skateboard facilities.

=== Community groups ===
- Nundah Combined St John Ambulance Division
- Nundah-Northgate Scout Group (Scouts Australia) celebrating centenary in 2009

=== Parks ===
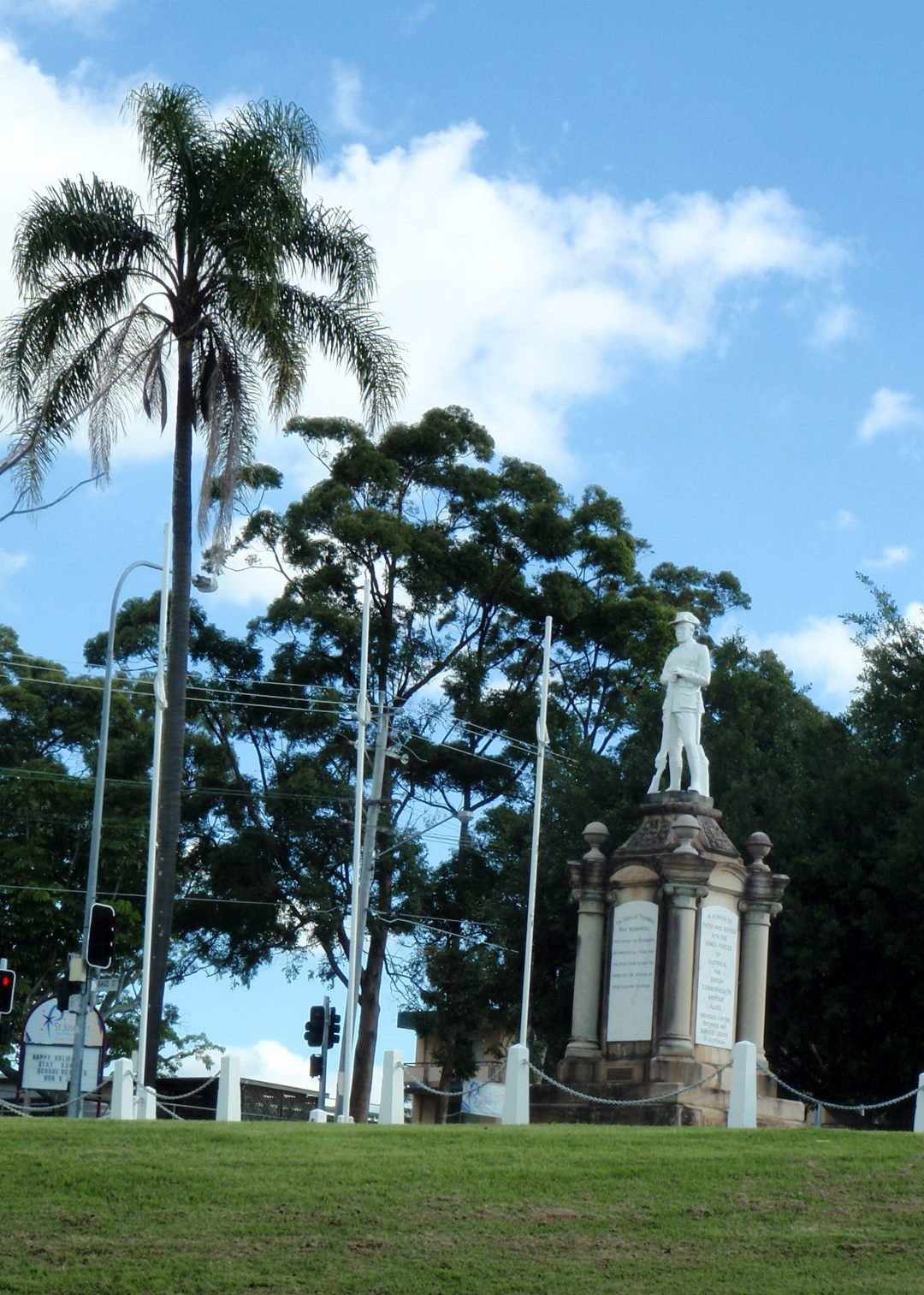
The Shire of Toombul War Memorial (Digger Memorial) at the Nundah Memorial Park

There are a number of parks in the suburb:

- Albert Bishop Park – Amelia Street, Hedley Avenue and Nudgee Road, adjoining Schulz Canal
- Boyd Park – Bage Street and Boyd, Park and Sandgate Roads
- Carew Street – Brook and Carew Streets
- Kalinga Park – Jackson and Kalinga Streets, Park Avenue and Sandgate Road, adjoining Schulz Canal
- Nundah Memorial Park (formerly Buckland Park) – Buckland Road and Bage Street
- Oxenham Park – Duke, Jenner and York Streets and Melton Road
- Plaisted Place – Cavendish, Flower and Maynard Streets
- Ross Park – Parkland Street and Sandgate Road, adjoining Schulz Canal
- Toombul Terrace – Bage, Gardner and Glenhill Streets, Hamson and Toombul Terraces and Royal Avenue (27.4084°S 153.0565°E)
- Upton Street – Upton Street, off London Street
- Wood Street (Road Reserve) – Bage and Wood Streets and Sandgate Road

== Transport ==
Due to its inner-northern location, there are a variety of options for transport within the suburb. Both Nundah railway station and Toombul railway station are located within the suburb. Both of these railway stations are on both the North Coast line and are served by Caboolture and Shorncliffe line services, giving both stations 15-minute frequencies throughout the day seven days a week. There are many council bus services that run through the area, including the Great Circle Line.

The Nundah Bypass is a 285-metre-long (935 ft) road tunnel, open to general traffic, that runs underneath the Nundah Village commercial area. Completed in 2001, it provides an alternative route to traffic traveling along Sandgate Road, allowing motorists to avoid the narrow streets of the village area, and reducing traffic congestion for local residents.

== Governance ==
Nundah is in the federal electorate of Lilley. The seat has been held by Anika Wells of the Australian Labor Party since the 2019 federal election. The suburb lies on the border between the state electorates of Clayfield (held by Liberal Tim Nicholls), and Nudgee (held by Labor's Leanne Linard). Locally, the suburb is part of the Northgate Ward, held by LNP's Adam Allan.

In earlier times, it was part of the Nundah electorate, one of the historical Electoral districts of Queensland.

== Notable residents ==
- George Bridges, (1820–1898) pioneer farmer and developer after whom the tunnel was named
- Thomas Bridges (1853–1939) son of George Bridges, Member of the Legislative Assembly
- Bob Bax, legendary coach of The Norths Brisbane first grade rugby league team which is based out of Bishop Park, Nundah and formerly Oxenham Park, Nundah. Bax coached the club to five of their historical six successive premiership victories between 1959 and 1964.
- Elizabeth Grace OAM (born 27 May 1940).OAM Citation: For service to the community of Nundah.
- Trevor Hohns Australian test cricketer and Chairman of Selectors
- Bill Knox (1927–2001) Member of the Legislative Assembly, Treasurer of Queensland
- Errold La Frantz MBE (25 May 1919 – 20 February 2015). Oval 2 at Oxenahm Park is named La Frantz Oval in honour of Errold.
- Ken Mackay Australian test cricketer
- Meta Truscott Australian diarist
