= Workers' Dwelling No.1 =

Heritage-listed detached house

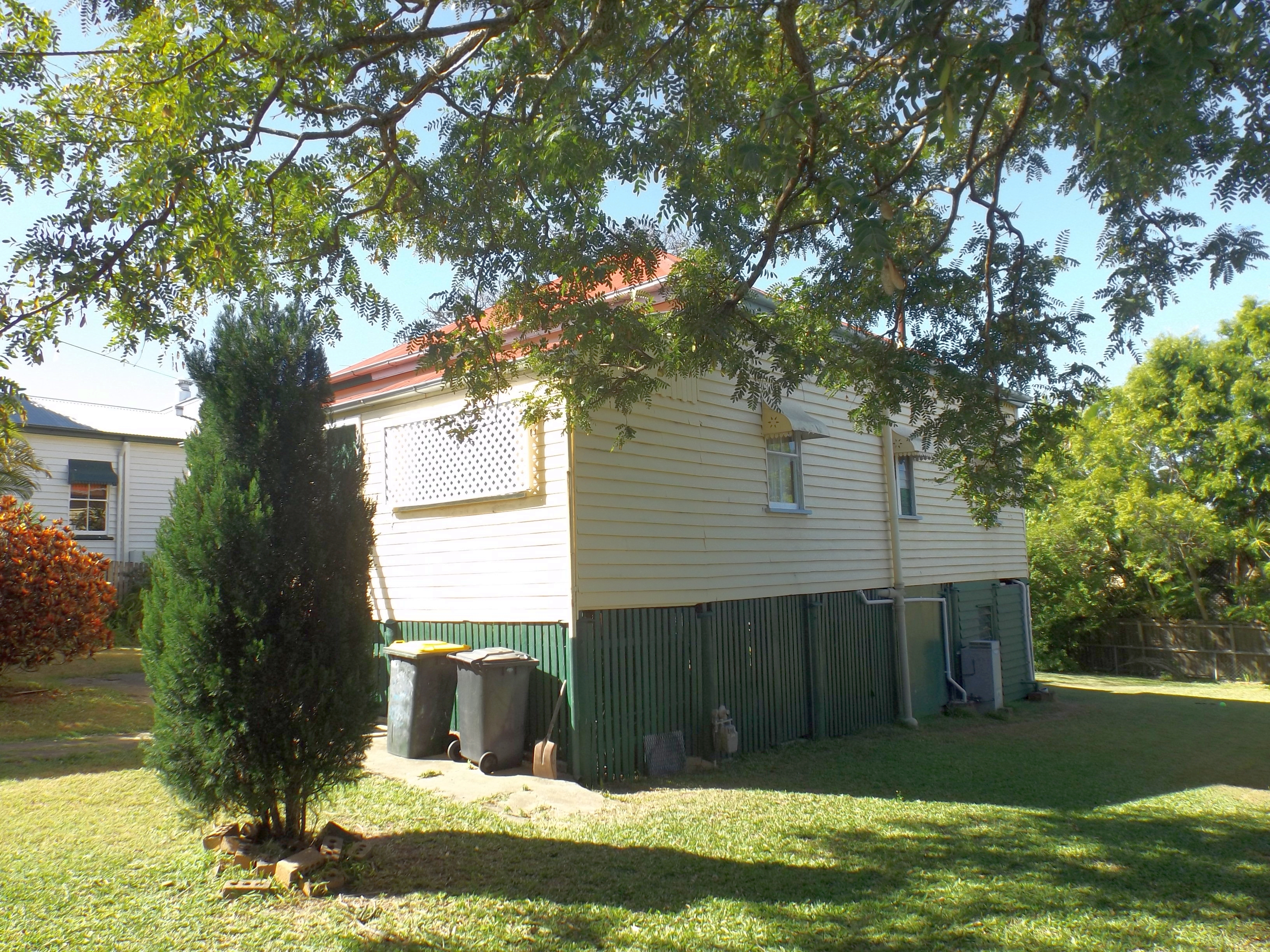
- Residence in 2015

- Location within Queensland Location within Australia
- 27.3962°S 153.062°E
- Location: 35 Surrey Street, Nundah, City of Brisbane, Queensland, Australia

History
- Design period: 1900–1914 (early 20th century)
- Built: 1910

Queensland Heritage Register
- Official name: Workers' Dwelling No.1
- Type: state heritage (built)
- Designated: 21 October 1992
- Reference no.: 600273
- Significant period: 1910s (fabric, history)
- Significant components: residential accommodation – main house, kitchen/kitchen house

Workers' Dwelling No.1 is a heritage-listed detached house at 35 Surrey Street, Nundah, City of Brisbane, Queensland, Australia. It was built in 1910. It was added to the Queensland Heritage Register on 21 October 1992.

== History ==
This house was constructed in 1910 for Caroline and Otto Gustav Weissner, and was the first home constructed under the provisions of the Queensland Worker's Dwelling Act 1909.

The Weissners acquired the Nundah site in June 1909, and on 14 March 1910 they made the first application for housing assistance under the new act.

The result was a mortgage of £190 to the Worker's Dwelling Board, and construction of the house at a total cost of £220. The mortgage was released in August 1925, when the property changed ownership.

The design - which probably emanated from the architectural office of the Worker's Dwelling Scheme - was conservative, economical, and typical of Queensland vernacular working class housing of the period.

The Worker's Dwelling Act 1909, administered as the Worker's Dwelling Scheme, provided for persons whose income was less than £400 per annum, and who owned a suitable site but no house, to be advanced up to two-thirds of the total value of the site plus the proposed dwelling, to the maximum of £300. Loans were to be repaid over twenty years at 5% interest. The scheme was an early Queensland Government initiative to assist working-class families to build and purchase their own homes, and was the precursor to the Queensland Housing Commission.

During the three decades in which the Worker's Dwelling Scheme was in operation, government assistance provided for the construction of 23,515 houses throughout Queensland, and largely created Brisbane's suburban sprawl of the 1920s and 1930s.

The popularity of the "workers dwelling" and later the "Queenslander" is directly attributable to the success of the Worker's Dwelling Scheme.

== Description ==
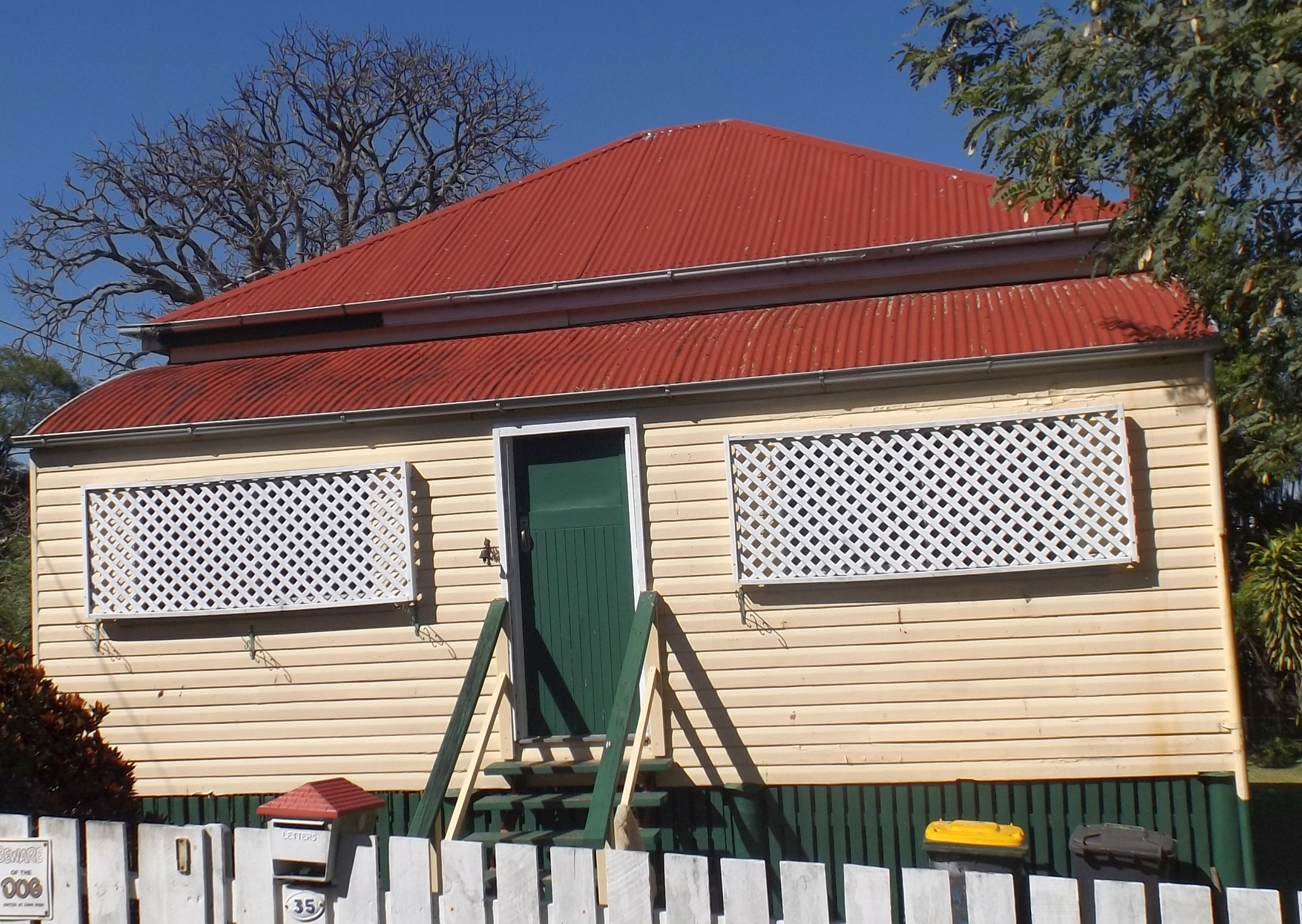
Front of the building, 2015

This is a small high-set weatherboard house with a short ridge corrugated-iron roof, a full-width front verandah with a convex iron roof which is now enclosed, and a half-width rear verandah, also enclosed.

Scalloped galvanised iron window shades enhance the side windows, which are sash type.

The interior of the core consists of a central hallway and four rooms, with a hipped-roof kitchen projecting at the rear.

Exterior modifications have detracted from the building's decorative appeal. In the process of enclosing the front verandah with timber cladding and aluminium windows, a dowelled balustrade, verandah gate and decorative timber posts with capitals and fretwork brackets have been lost. Modern quad guttering has replaced the original ogee profile and acroteria. Timber stumps have been supplanted by concrete and the front fence has been replaced.

== Heritage listing ==
Workers' Dwelling No.1 was listed on the Queensland Heritage Register on 21 October 1992 having satisfied the following criteria.

The place is important in demonstrating the evolution or pattern of Queensland's history.

Worker's Dwelling No.1, erected in 1910, is significant as the first house to be constructed under the provisions of the influential Worker's Dwelling Act of 1909.

The place is important in demonstrating the principal characteristics of a particular class of cultural places.

It is representative of the "timber and tin" housing which predominated in Queensland prior to the Second World War, as a direct result of the Worker's Dwelling Scheme.
