= Toombul railway station =

Railway station in Queensland, Australia

Toombul
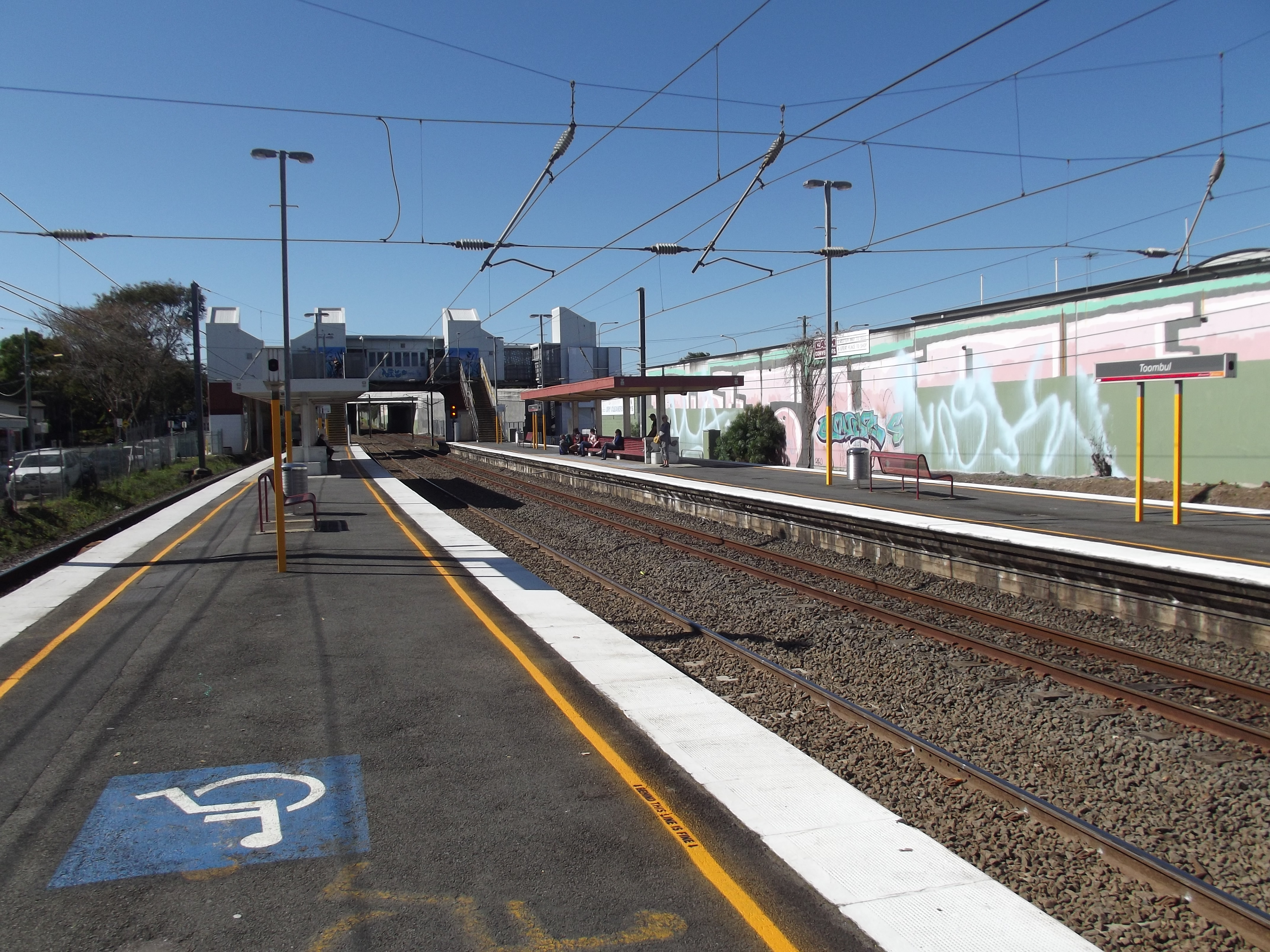
- Northbound view from Platform 3 in December 2012

General information
- Location: Bradbury Street, Nundah
- Coordinates: 27.4076°S 153.0588°E
- Owner: Queensland Rail
- Operator: Queensland Rail
- Line: T4 Shorncliffe
- Distance: 7.83 kilometres from Central
- Platforms: 4 (2 islands)
- Connections: Toombul bus interchange

Construction
- Structure type: Ground
- Parking: 104 bays
- Accessible: Yes

Other information
- Status: Staffed
- Station code: 600397 (platform 1); 600398 (platform 2); 600399 (platform 3); 600400 (platform 4)
- Fare zone: Zone 1
- Website: Queensland Rail

Services
Preceding station	Queensland Rail	Following station
Eagle Junction towards Cleveland via Roma Street	T4 Shorncliffe line	Nundah towards Shorncliffe
Location

Toombul is a railway station operated by Queensland Rail on the Shorncliffe line. It opened in 1882 and serves the Brisbane suburb of Nundah. It is a ground level station, featuring two island platforms with two faces each.

== Platforms and services ==
Toombul station is served daily by all stops City network services from Shorncliffe to Central, many continuing to Boggo Road, Cannon Hill, Manly and Cleveland

Toombul platform arrangement
Platform	Line	Destination	Notes
1	T4 Shorncliffe	Roma Street (to Cleveland line)	
2	T4 Shorncliffe	Shorncliffe	
3	No scheduled services		
4	No scheduled services		

== Transport links ==
Toombul station is served by Transport for Brisbane buses calling at the nearby Toombul bus interchange.
