= Sandgate Road =

Road in Brisbane, Australia

Sandgate Road Queensland
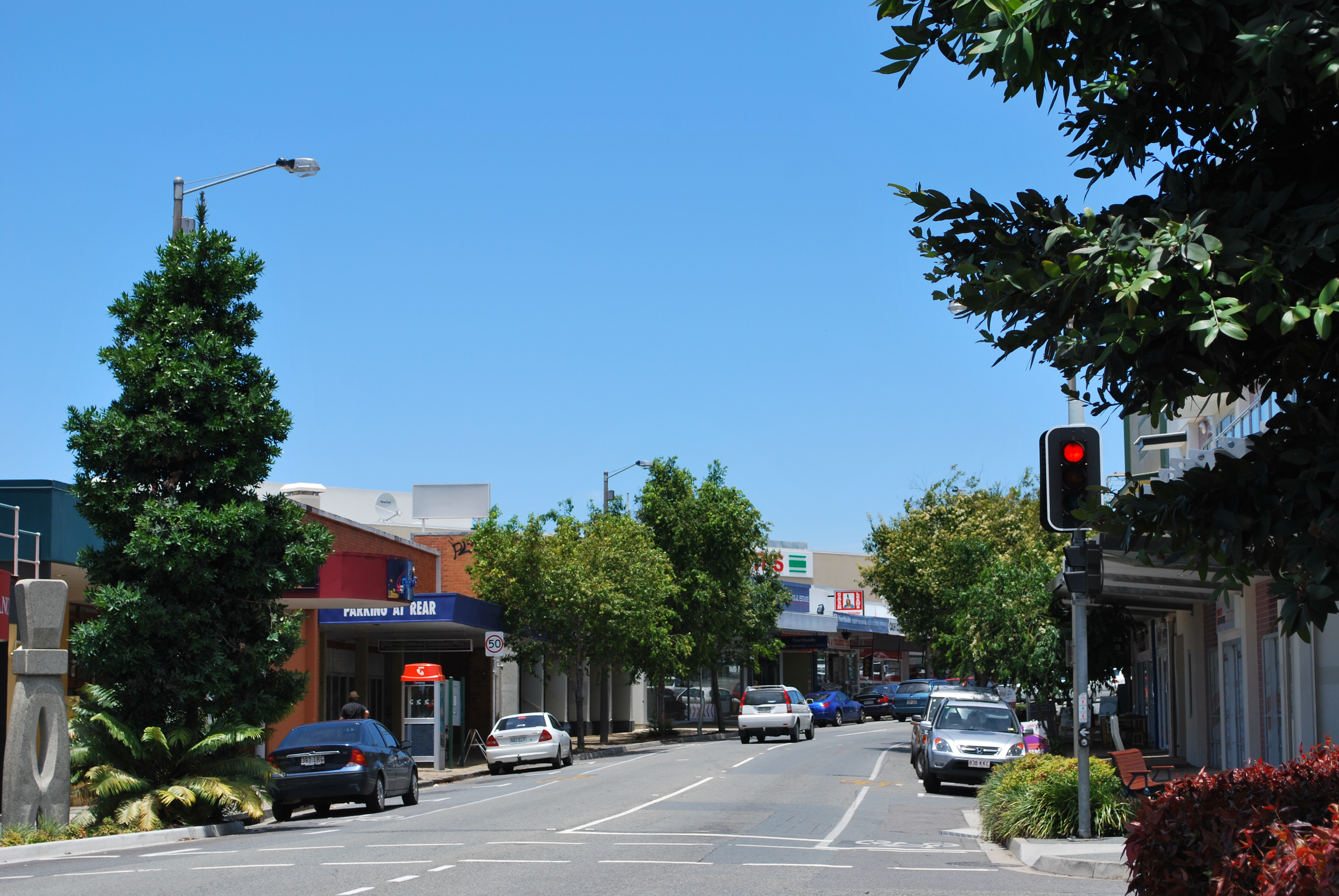
- Sandgate Road at Nundah, 2008

General information
- Type: Road
- Length: 13.1 km (8.1 mi)
- Route number(s): (no shield) Hutcheson Street to Abbotsford Road, Albion; State Route 26 Albion to Deagon

Major junctions
- South end: Hutcheson Street Albion
- Abbotsford Road; Junction Road; Robinson Road East; Gateway Motorway for full list see exits.
- North end: Braun Street (State Route 26) Deagon

Location(s)
- Major suburbs: Clayfield, Nundah, Virginia, Boondall

Sandgate Road is a major road in Brisbane, Queensland, Australia. It provides part of the road connection between Redcliffe and the Brisbane CBD. It is designated state route 26 throughout most of its length.

The road is divided for the majority of its route, ranging from 4 to 6 lanes in some rare places with the majority of the road being 2 to 4 lanes. It also includes a tunneled section (the George Bridges Tunnel named after local pioneer George Bridges) underneath the town centre of Nundah. It also passes the now closed and demolished Toombul Shopping Centre opposite Toombul railway station.

According to surveys by the RACQ, Sandgate Road is one of the states 10 most frustrating roads.

At Clayfield, the road crosses the Doomben railway line via an overpass.

== History ==
=== Early days ===
European settlement occurred along what is now Sandgate Road from as early as 1838 (see Nundah history for an example) but the first bridges over Breakfast Creek were often destroyed by floods. The first permanent bridge from Breakfast Creek Road was built in 1858, and the first permanent bridge on Bowen Bridge Road was in 1860.

Prior to the 1870s the road from Albion to Nundah ran to the west of the present route. It followed what is now Bonney Avenue to the area now occupied by the railway line near Eagle Junction railway station, crossing what is now Junction Road and proceeding along what is now Jackson Street to Kedron Brook. This route involved negotiating a track over low land subject to frequent flooding, in addition to crossing Kedron Brook itself, before proceeding along what is now Bage Street. It is possible to walk a close approximation of this route (see map) It is the shortest walking route for this journey.

For information on changes to the route of Sandgate Road through Nundah in the 1860s refer to Nundah growth.

The following timeline shows events that were pertinent to the development of Sandgate Road.

Date	Details
1838	First European settlement at Nundah
1853	First European settlement at Sandgate
1858	First substantial bridge over Breakfast Creek
1861	Bridge over Cabbage Tree Creek
1868	Coach service from Sandgate to Brisbane
1860s	Routing of Sandgate Road through what is now Nundah Village
Late 1870s	New Sandgate Road from Clayfield to Nundah (with better crossing of Kedron Brook)

=== Recent changes ===
Before the construction of Stage 3 of the Inner City Bypass in 2002 the southern end of Sandgate Road was at the point where Breakfast Creek Road crosses Breakfast Creek. Prior to the construction of the Abbotsford Road Bridge in 1928 this was the only direct access to Sandgate Road from the Brisbane CBD.

== Upgrades ==
=== Intersection upgrades ===
A project to upgrade the intersection with Cameron Street, at a cost of $1.336 million, was to start in August 2022.

A project to upgrade the intersection with Northgate Road, at a cost of $1.296 million, was to start in August 2022.

== Major intersections ==
The entire road is in the Brisbane local government area.

Location	km	mi	Destinations	Notes
Albion	0	0.0	Hutcheson Street runs north through Albion	Southern end of Sandgate Road (no route number)
Albion	0.2	0.12	Argyle Street runs south through Albion	
Albion	1.0	0.62	Abbotsford Road (State Route 26) runs south to Bowen Hills	Sandgate Road continues north as State Route 26
Albion	1.3	0.81	Albion Overpass runs west to Windsor	
Clayfield	2.4	1.5	Oriel Road runs east to Ascot	
Clayfield	3.1	1.9	Junction Road (State Route 20) runs west to Wooloowin / Junction Road (no shield) runs east to Hendra	
Clayfield–Nundah boundary	4.4	2.7	Airport Link runs west to Lutwyche / and east to Hendra	
Nundah	5.0	3.1	Sandgate Road (former route – no shield) runs north through Nundah Village	Sandgate Road (State Route 26) continues north–east through the Nundah Bypass Tunnel
Nundah	5.6	3.5	Sandgate Road (former route – no shield) runs south–east through Nundah Village	
Nundah	5.9	3.7	Rode Road runs west to Wavell Heights	
Nundah	6.3	3.9	Northgate Road runs north–east to Northgate	
Nundah	6.5	4.0	Hamilton Road runs west to Wavell Heights	
Virginia	7.8– 8.0	4.8– 5.0	Toombul Road runs south–east to Northgate	
Virginia	9.0	5.6	Robinson Road East (State Route 28) runs west to Geebung	
Boondall	9.9	6.2	Zillmere Road runs west to Zillmere	
Boondall	11.0	6.8	Beams Road runs west to Zillmere and Taigum / Stanworth Road runs north–east to Boondall	
Boondall	12.0	7.5	Roghan Road runs west to Fitzgibbon / Carlyle Road runs east to Boondall	
Route transition

== See also ==
- Nundah Bypass Tunnel
- George Bridges
- List of road routes in Queensland
