= Toombul Shopping Centre =

Abandoned shopping mall in Toombul, Brisbane Australia

- Toombul shopping centre, 2005
- Location: Toombul, Brisbane Australia
- Coordinates: 27°24′30″S 153°03′40″E
- Opened: 11 October 1967; 59 years ago
- Closed: 18 May 2022; 4 years ago
- Developer: Queensland
- Manager: Queensland
- Owner: Queensland
- Num. of stores: 146
- Num. of anchor tenants: 5
- Floor area: 47,034 m²
- Floors: 2
- Website: toombul.com.au

Toombul Shopping Centre was an enclosed suburban shopping centre located in the locality of Toombul which is part of Nundah, a suburb of the City of Brisbane in the state of Queensland, Australia. The centre was anchored by Target and Kmart discount department stores, a Coles supermarket, an Aldi Food Store, an eight-screen Event Cinema, and more than 140 specialty stores, including Daiso.

The centre was opened on 11 October 1967 by the Westfield Group. Over the years it was remodelled, with several extensions, the most recent being a new dining and entertainment precinct upgrade on the second level. Toombul was the largest shopping centre on Brisbane's northside, until Westfield Chermside's redevelopment in 1999–2000.

In February 2022, the centre experienced severe damage due to flooding, and a decision was made not to reopen it. Business owners received a letter informing them that "it is impractical and undesirable to reinstate the centre to how it was prior to the flooding damage. As a result, to provide our retailers with certainty we have taken the difficult decision to close Toombul Shopping Centre and terminate all leases."

Demolition commenced in February 2024.

== History ==
Around 2006, the future of the centre looked uncertain, due to increased competition from rival centres at Chermside, Nundah and Brisbane Airport, as well the ageing building itself. Much of the blame for the decline, even while the surrounding area is booming, has been laid at the feet of Centro, with poor management practices cited.

On 21 August 2008, it was announced that Centro Toombul was for sale.

On 20 July 2010, David Jones announced that it would terminate its lease at Centro Toombul, ending the store's 35-year-long relationship with the centre. After David Jones closed on 29 January 2011, the store space was taken over by discount department store Target.

In November 2013, the centre was re-branded "Toombul", to reflect the re-branding of Centro Properties Group as Federation Centres in January 2013.

In March 2016, it was announced that a new, small-format Bunnings store would open in the first half of 2017 in BI-LO/Coles old position.

In May 2016, the centre was acquired by Mirvac. Mirvac's short-term plan for the centre included improvements to the car parks, convenience, and the enhancement of the retail offering to better align with changing demographics. Medium- to long-term plans included the potential to deliver a new entertainment offering and dining precinct.

On 27 February 2022, during the 2022 Brisbane floods, torrential rain fell for three consecutive days over south-east Queensland, and the entire precinct was inundated. The shopping centre closed due to the flooding, and no date was given for its reopening. In May 2022, following an inspection of the damage, it was determined that the centre would not be safe to reopen, due to the extent of the damage to the building's structural integrity. As a result, Mirvac announced that all leases were to be terminated, due to the extent of the flood damage, as well as the high vacancy rate in the shopping centre.

The Brisbane Times revealed that state MP, Tim Nicholls, had met Mirvac senior management in August 2022. This led to Mirvac saying it would allow the community to have a say in several months, after it made a decision over the future of the site". In that article, Nicholls was quoted as saying that there was a need for a "substantial retail component", because the inner Northside was "not serviced by a decent-sized shopping centre from the CBD until Chermside".

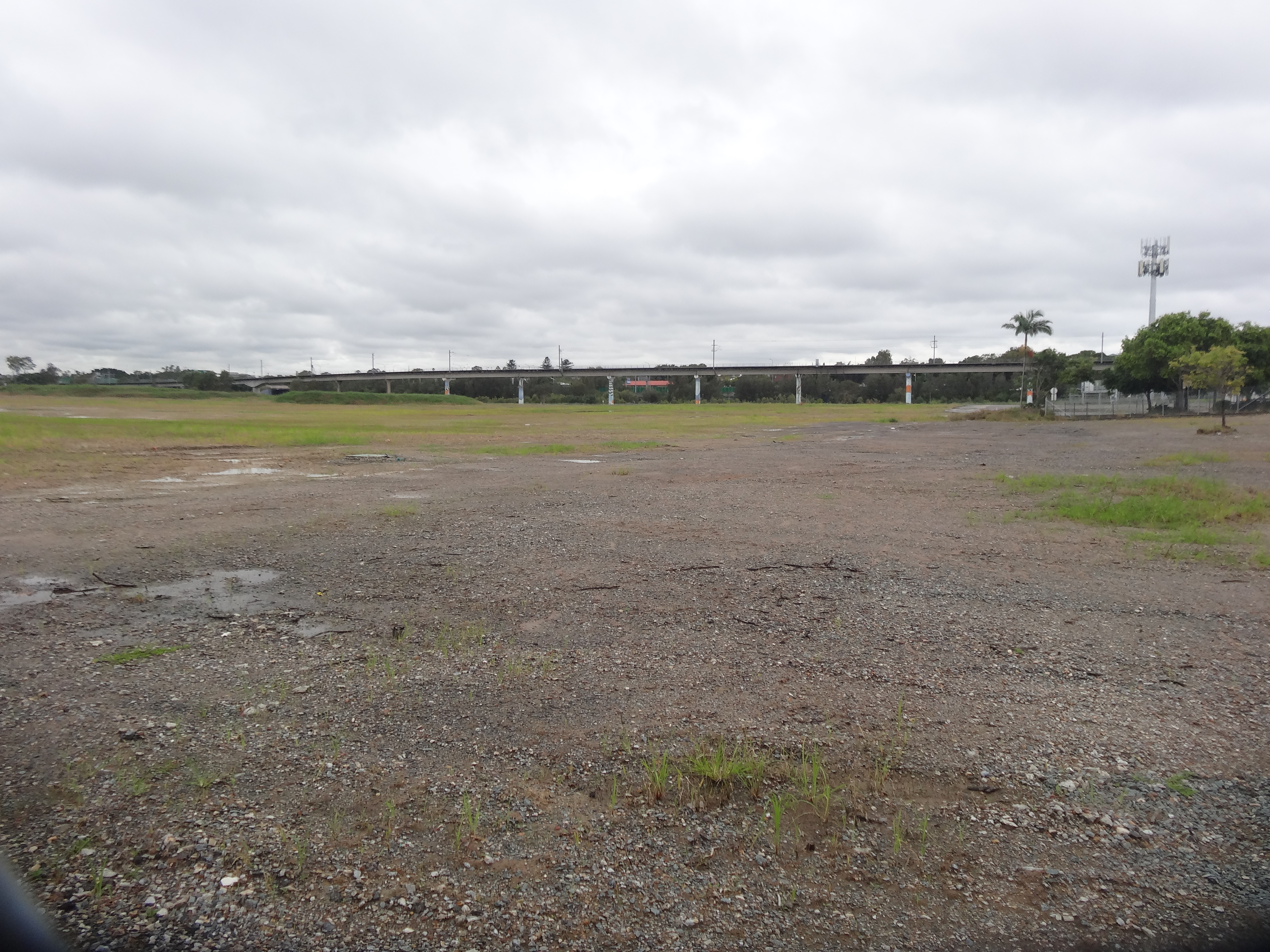
site in May 2025

On 15 September 2022, the 4BC Breakfast Show with Neil Breen confirmed that retail space would be rebuilt on the site, whereas Mirvac had previously said it would be considered. The development would also include public open space and flood mitigation strategies. It was to go out to public consultation in the coming months, after considerable public pressure. Complete demolition of the site began in February 2024, expected to take 12 months, and planning for the long-term future is underway.
