= Sandgate railway station, Brisbane =

Railway station in Queensland, Australia

Sandgate
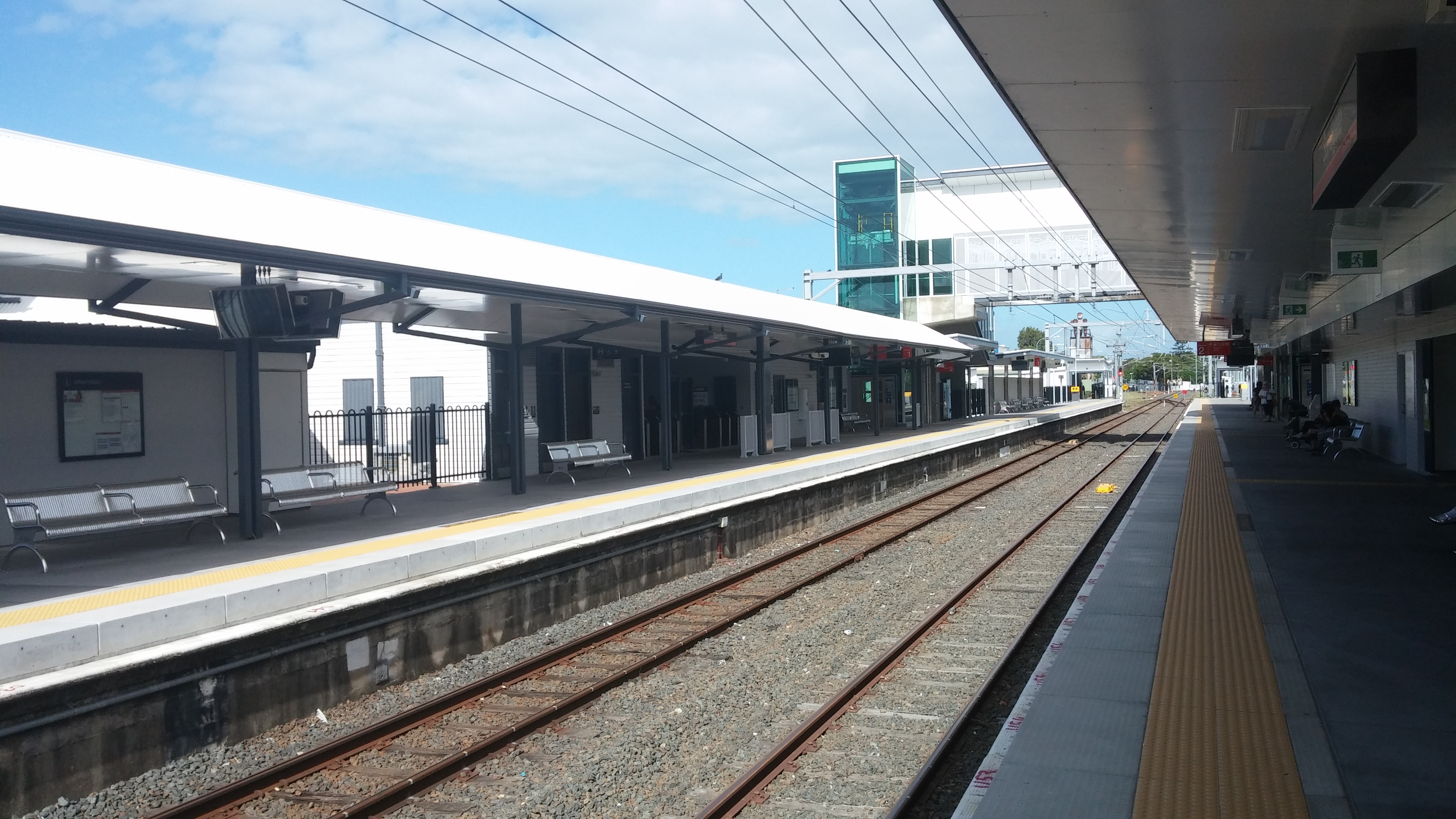
- Eastbound view from Platform 2 in January 2014

General information
- Location: Chubb Street off Rainbow Street, Sandgate
- Coordinates: 27°19′20″S 153°04′10″E
- Owner: Queensland Rail
- Operator: Queensland Rail
- Line: T4 Shorncliffe
- Distance: 19.4 kilometres from Central
- Platforms: 2 (2 side)
- Tracks: 2
- Bus routes: 9
- Bus stands: 5

Construction
- Structure type: Ground
- Parking: 236 bays
- Cycle facilities: Yes
- Accessible: Yes

Other information
- Status: Staffed
- Station code: 600424 (platform 1); 600423 (platform 2)
- Fare zone: Zone 2
- Website: Queensland Rail

History
- Opened: 1882
- Rebuilt: 2014
- Former names: Sandgate Central

Services
Preceding station	Queensland Rail	Following station
Deagon towards Cleveland via Roma Street	T4 Shorncliffe line	Shorncliffe Terminus
Location

Sandgate is a railway station operated by Queensland Rail on the Shorncliffe line. It opened in 1882 and serves the Brisbane suburb of Sandgate. It is a ground level station, featuring two side platforms.

== History ==
The railway line from Brisbane to Sandgate opened in 1882. The terminal station was located near Curlew Street, behind the Osbourne Hotel, and was named Sandgate. The line was extended to Shorncliffe in 1897 and the new terminal station was named Sandgate while the original terminus was renamed Sandgate Central. In 1911 Sandgate Central station was relocated to its present position, closer to the Post Office. When the former Sandgate station was renamed Shorncliffe in 1938, Sandgate Central was renamed simply Sandgate.

== Services ==
Sandgate station is served by all stops Shorncliffe line services from Shorncliffe to Roma Street, Cannon Hill, Manly and Cleveland.

== Platforms and services ==
Sandgate platform arrangement
Platform	Line	Destination	Notes
1	T4 Shorncliffe	Shorncliffe	
2	T4 Shorncliffe	Roma Street (to Cleveland line)	

== Bus routes by stop ==
Stop	Route number	Destination	Locations/Roads Serving
Stop 1	311	Bracken Ridge	Nashville State School, Brighton, Bracken Ridge High School
Stop 1	312	Brighton	Nashville State School, Bracken Ridge High School
Stop 1	313 (drop-off only)	from Shorncliffe	Shorncliffe Primary School, St Patrick’s College, Shorncliffe station
Stop 1	314	Deagon	Wharf St, St Patrick’s College, Deagon station
Stop 1	326 (inbound)	Toombul	Boondall, Taigum, Zillmere, Geebung, Wavell Heights, Nundah
Stop 1	326 (outbound)	Fitzgibbon	Deagon, Bracken Ridge, Carseldine station
Stop 2	690	Clontarf (Duffield Rd)	Brighton, Hornibrook Esp, Oxley Avenue, Redcliffe, Scarborough, Kippa-Ring station, Elizabeth Avenue
Stop 2	N310 (drop-off only)	from George Street	Fortitude Valley, Clayfield, Toombul, Nundah, Virginia, Boondall, Deagon
Stop 3	691	Scarborough	Brighton, Clontarf, Redcliffe
Stop 4	335	Queen Street	Boondall, Zillmere, Carseldine, Aspley, Chermside, Grange
Rainbow St, stop 33	310 (inbound)	Queen Street	Deagon, Boondall, Virginia, Nundah, Toombul, RBWH, Fortitude Valley

== Transport links ==
Transport for Brisbane operate seven bus routes to and from Sandgate station:

- 310: Brighton to City
- 311: to Bracken Ridge
- 312: to Brighton
- 313: from Shorncliffe
- 314: Deagon to Shorncliffe
- 326: Fitzgibbon to Toombul
- 335: to City via Chermside
- N310: City to Sandgate

Hornibrook Bus Lines operate two bus routes to and from Sandgate station:

- 690: to Redcliffe
- 691: to Scarborough
