= Toombul bus interchange =

Bus interchange in Brisbane, Australia

Toombul
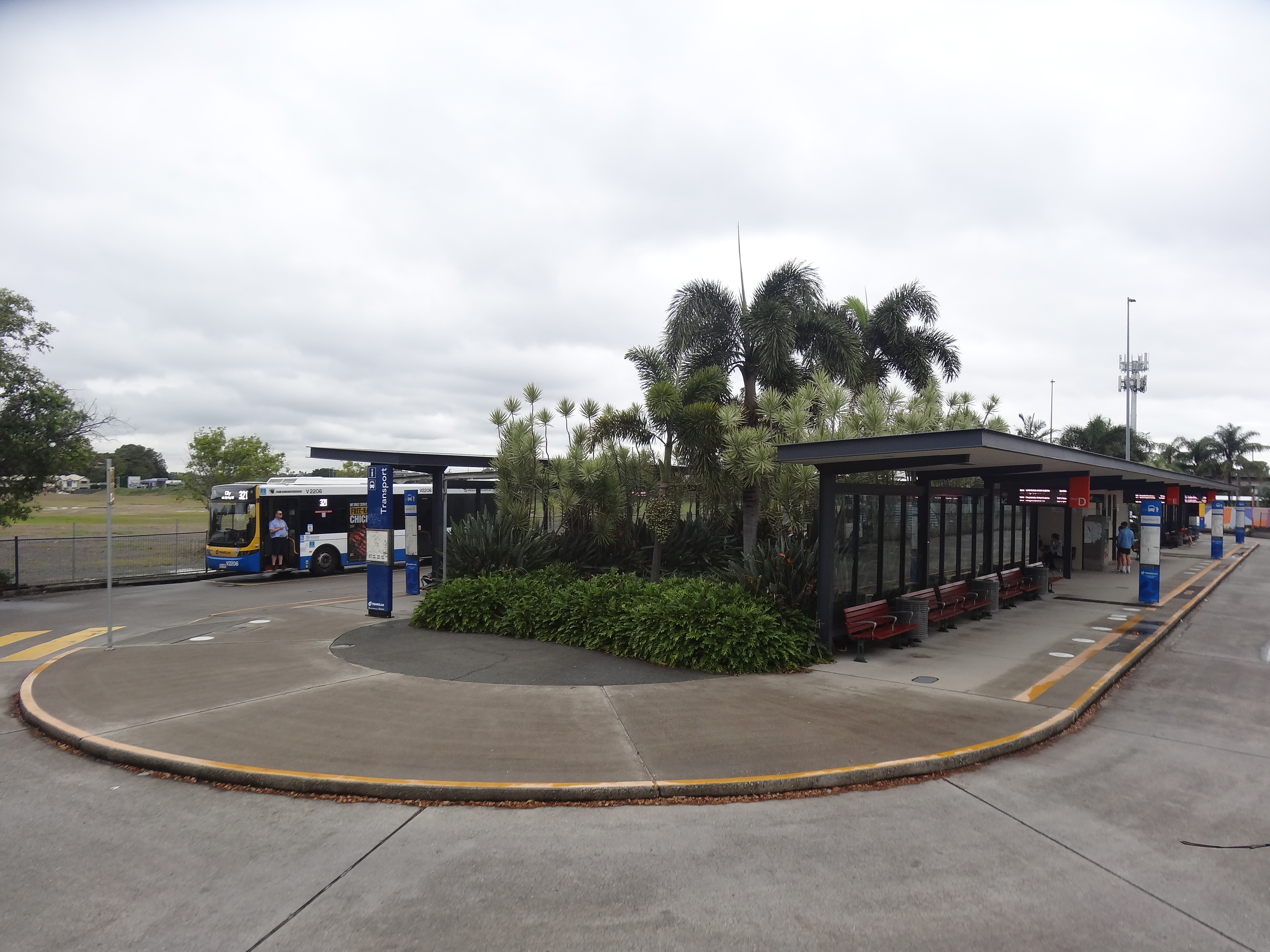
- View of the bus station in May 2025

General information
- Location: Sandgate Road, Nundah
- Coordinates: 27.408241°S 153.06005°E
- Platforms: 1
- Bus routes: 14
- Bus stands: 8
- Connections: Toombul railway station

Construction
- Parking: Park and ride
- Accessible: Yes

Other information
- Station code: 011130 (Stop A); 011133 (Stop B); 011137 (Stop C); 011139 (Stop D); 011135 (Stop E); 011131 (Stop F); 011159 (Sandgate Rd, n/bound); 004508 (Sandgate Rd, s/bound)
- Website: Translink
Location

Toombul is a bus station operated by Translink. It opened in 1967 and serves the Brisbane suburb of Nundah. It is a ground level station, featuring one island platform with six bus stands.

The bus station is adjacent to Toombul railway station. It was previously attached to the Toombul Shopping Centre, which was demolished in 2022.

== Facilities ==
The bus station is made up of eight bus stops including two on Sandgate Road. The bus station is an island, similar to an island platform, located in the former Toombul Shopping Centre car park. The island is split into east and west with three bus stops each. The bus station contains toilets, vending machines, seats, drinking fountains, bike racks and a rest area for bus drivers.

== Bus routes ==
The following bus routes service Toombul bus station:

Stop	Route number	Destination	Locations/roads serving
Stop A	306	Cultural Centre	Clayfield, Fortitude Valley and City
Stop A	322	Cultural Centre2 morning services to Adelaide St	Clayfield, Fortitude Valley and City
Stop B	369	Mitchelton station	Clayfield, Eagle Junction, Wooloowin, Kedron Brook, Stafford, Everton Park
Stop B	590	Garden City	Skygate (Brisbane Airport), Eagle Farm, Cannon Hill, Carindale, Mount Gravatt
Stop C	300	Cultural Centre	Clayfield, Hendra, Ascot, Hamilton, Newstead, Fortitude Valley, City
Stop C	301	Cultural Centre	Clayfield, Hendra, Ascot, Albion, Bowen Hills, Fortitude Valley, Spring Hill, City
Stop D	306	NudgeeSome services finish at Nudgee Beach	Nundah, Northgate, Virginia, Banyo
Stop D	307	Northgate (loop) Some weekday services continue to ACU, Nudgee	Nundah, Northgate, Banyo (ACU services only)
Stop D	322	Chermside	Nundah, Wavell Heights
Stop E	598	Great Circle Line (anti-clockwise)	Chermside, Brookside, Ashgrove, Toowong, Indooroopilly, Salisbury, Coopers Plains, Sunnybank, Garden City, Mount Gravatt, Carindale, Cannon Hill
Stop E	599	Great Circle Line (clockwise)	Cannon Hill, Carindale, Mount Gravatt, Garden City, Sunnybank, Coopers Plains, Salisbury, Indooroopilly, Toowong, Ashgrove, Brookside, Chermside
Stop F	321	Queen Street	Clayfield, Wooloowin, Lutwyche, Windsor, RBWH, Spring Hill, City
Stop F	326	Carseldine station	Nundah, Wavell Heights, Geebung, Zillmere, Taigum, Boondall, Sandgate, Deagon, Bracken Ridge, Fitzgibbon
Stop F	327	Strathpine Centre	Nundah, Wavell Heights, Geebung, Zillmere, Taigum, Bracken Ridge, Bald Hills
Sandgate Rd at Toombul, stop 32 (southbound)	310	Bracken Ridge	RBWH, Fortitude Valley, City
Sandgate Rd at Toombul, stop 32 (northbound)	310	Brighton	Nundah, Virginia, Boondall, Deagon, Sandgate
Sandgate Rd at Toombul, stop 32 (northbound)	N310	Sandgate	Nundah, Virginia, Boondall, Deagon
