= Zillmere railway station =

Railway station in Queensland, Australia

Zillmere
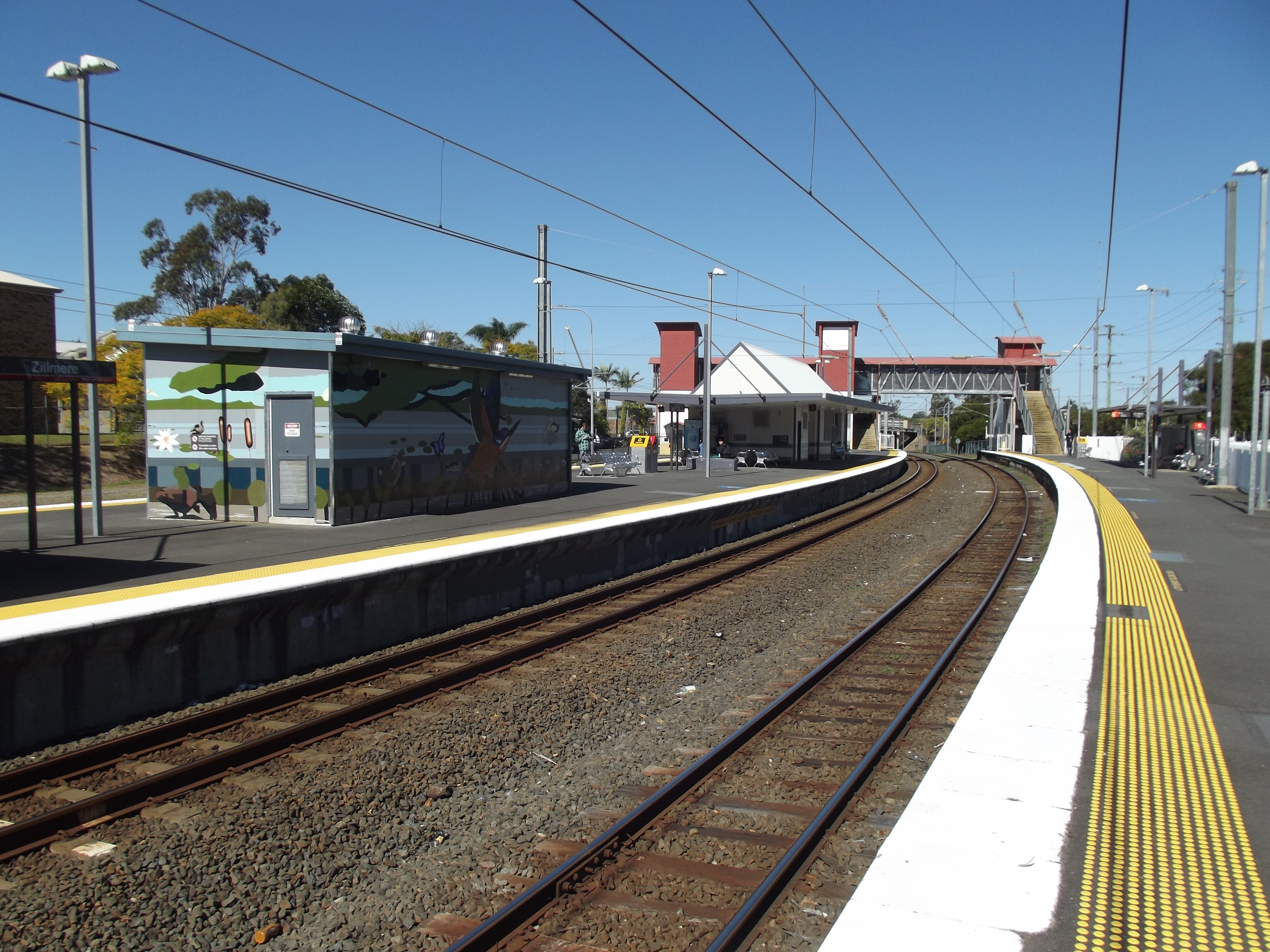
- Southbound view from Platform 3 in August 2012

General information
- Location: Zillmere Road, Zillmere
- Coordinates: 27.3588°S 153.0368°E
- Owner: Queensland Rail
- Operator: Queensland Rail
- Line: Redcliffe Peninsula
- Distance: 14.95 kilometres from Central
- Platforms: 3 (1 side, 1 island)

Construction
- Structure type: Ground
- Parking: 218 bays
- Accessible: Yes

Other information
- Status: Staffed part-time
- Station code: 600446 (platform 1); 600447 (platform 2); 600448 (platform 3)
- Fare zone: Zone 2
- Website: Queensland Rail

History
- Opened: 1888; 138 years ago

Services
Preceding station	Queensland Rail	Following station
Geebung towards Springfield Central via Roma Street	Redcliffe Peninsula line	Carseldine towards Kippa-Ring
Location

Zillmere is a railway station operated by Queensland Rail on the Redcliffe Peninsula line. It opened in 1888 serves the Brisbane suburb of Zillmere. It is a ground level station, featuring one island platforms with two faces each and one side platform.

== Services ==
Zillmere is served by all Citytrain network services from Kippa-Ring to Central, many continuing to Springfield Central.

== Services by platform ==
Zillmere platform arrangement
Platform	Line	Destinations	Notes
1	Redcliffe Peninsula	Roma Street & Springfield Central	
1	Redcliffe Peninsula	Ipswich	1 weekday afternoon service only
2	Redcliffe Peninsula	Kippa-Ring	Evening peak only
3	Redcliffe Peninsula	Kippa-Ring	

== Transport links ==
Transport for Brisbane operate six bus routes via Zillmere station:

- 330: Bracken Ridge to Cultural Centre busway station
- P331: Bracken Ridge to George Street, Brisbane
- P332: Zillmere to University of Queensland
- N339: Fortitude Valley to Bracken Ridge – Saturdays and Sundays only
- 326: Bracken Ridge/Sandgate to Toombul
- 327: Strathpine/Bracken Ridge to Toombul
