= St John Fisher College, Bracken Ridge =

Girls' Secondary School in Brisbane, Australia

St John Fisher College

Location
- John Fisher Dr, Bracken Ridge; Brisbane, Queensland, 4017; Australia; 27°18′49.68″S 153°2′38.76″E

Information
- Type: Private, single-sex, day school
- Motto: Go Far, See More, Reach Further
- Denomination: Roman Catholic
- Established: 1981; 45 years ago
- Principal: Britt Gurnett
- Affiliation: Catholic Secondary Schoolgirls' Sports Association
- Website: Official site

St John Fisher College is an independent Roman Catholic girls secondary school located in the Brisbane suburb of Bracken Ridge, Queensland, Australia. It is administered by the Queensland Catholic Education Commission, with an enrolment of 639 students and a teaching staff of 61, as of 2023. The school serves students from Year 7 to Year 12 and is a member of the Catholic Secondary Schoolgirls' Sports Association.

== History ==
The school opened on 5 October 1981, which officially brought secondary education to the suburb of Bracken Ridge.

In 2007, the school was forced to close temporarily due to a burst water main; at the time it was unknown if it was a school issue or a council issue.

== Houses ==
The houses at St John's Fishers are named after prominent religious figures, they include:

House	Colour	Name origin
Bridgeman	Green	The Bridgeman Family
McAuley	Yellow	Catherine McAuley
Quinn	Red	James Quinn
Rochester	Blue	John Fisher

== Notable alumni ==
- Emily Seebohm, Australian swimmer and television personality

== See also ==
- List of schools in Greater Brisbane
