= Boondall State School =

Primary school in Brisbane, Australia

Location
- Brisbane, Queensland; Australia; 27.3483°S 153.0592°E

Information
- Type: Public
- Motto: Success by work
- Established: 1925
- Principal: Matthew Denzin
- Years offered: Boys & girls, P–6
- Enrollment: 648 (2023)
- Campus: Boondall
- Colours: Yellow and blue
- Website: http://boondallss.eq.edu.au

Boondall State School is an independent public co-educational primary school located in the Brisbane suburb of Boondall, Queensland, Australia. It is administered by the Queensland Department of Education, with an enrolment of 648 students and a teaching staff of 45, as of 2023. The school serves students from Prep to Year 6.

The school has been placed on the Brisbane Heritage Register as a Local Heritage Place since 1 July 2003, due to the schools Arbor Day trees.

== History ==
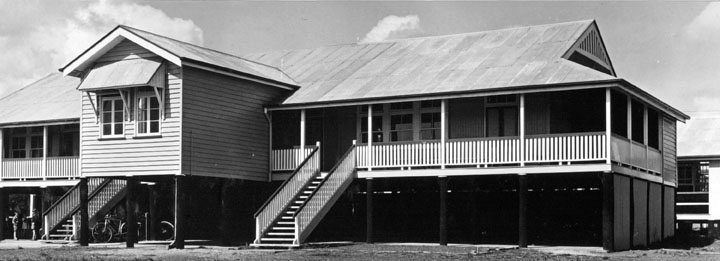
New classroom and teachers' room, Boondall State School, April 1951

A state primary school was advocated to be built in the region in 1920, and was for the next four years, even though clearing of the land for the school had started in August 1921. A request for a school to be constructed in Boondall was submitted to the then Minister for Public Instruction, John Huxham, on 19 April 1920. One month later during a public meeting on 19 June 1920 a school building committee was formed. The approval of the school to be built and the acquisition of the land was granted on 17 July 1920; however, it wasn't until 5 August 1924 before the construction of the school was authorised.

Boondall State School was built in early 1925, with the school being established on 2 April, and opening on 6 April 1925, with an enrolment of 61 students, out of a capacity of 80. The opening ceremony was held on Saturday afternoon, 18 April 1925, by the Minister of Education at the time, Thomas Wilson.

The Department of Education (then the Department of Public Instruction) encouraged the grounds of state schools to be pristine, evident through the fact that prizes were awarded to the schools that had maintained their playgrounds and school gardens. To instill this, the department had made Arbor Day as part of the annual school calendar, which included the planting of shade trees or flowering shrubs. The day has been celebrated since the year of the school's opening in 1925. On Arbor Day in 1925, the students, parents and neighbours of the school planted trees on the school grounds, with the trees being planted along the fence line that bordered both Roscommon and Sandgate Road.

The garden with the trees became neglected by 1929 and the neglect lasted right through the early years of the Great Depression. One of the trees was lost in 1930, not due to the neglect, but a bushfire, which came very close to the school building.

In 1932, corporal punishment at the school was almost entirely ruled out, being replaced with the 'Young Sports' Association', which was made up of school seniors, who held up the 'ideals of a good sport: one who is modest in victory, smiling under defeat, and is able to play the game as it should be played.' The association worked like a court, trying offenders and recommending punishments on the wrongdoers. By 1933 the school's experiment with moral suasion was reported to be effective, with the number of behaviour related incidents decreasing significantly. It is unclear if or when the association was abolished.

The events for Arbor Day of 1933 saw five non-native camphor laurel trees being planted, and by 1935, the neglect of the gardens was no longer evident. 1936 saw the total number of Arbor Day trees had risen to thirty-two, however, since then, some of the trees have died or have been removed.

On 18 August 1966, a fire had destroyed the original school building. The surviving Arbor Day trees are now considered the remnants of the original school.

== Demographics ==
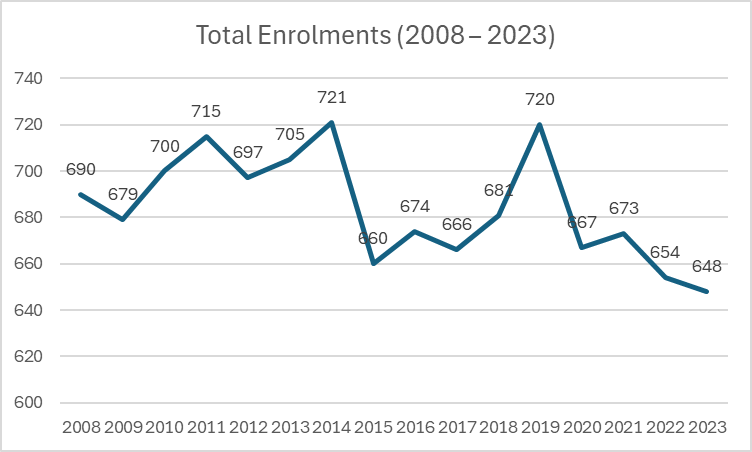
Boondall State School Enrolment Data from 2008 to 2023

In 2021, the school had a student enrolment of 673 students with 45 (40.5 full-time equivalent) and 36 non-teaching staff (19.4 full-time equivalent). Female enrolments consisted of 336 students and Male enrolments consisted of 337 students; Indigenous enrolments accounted for a total of 6% and 37% of students had a language background other than English.

In 2022, the school had a student enrolment of 654 students with 49 (43 full-time equivalent) and 32 non-teaching staff (18.4 full-time equivalent). Female enrolments consisted of 325 students and Male enrolments consisted of 329 students; Indigenous enrolments accounted for a total of 6% and 35% of students had a language background other than English.

In 2023, the school had a student enrolment of 648 students with 45 (39.1 full-time equivalent) and 28 non-teaching staff (16.8 full-time equivalent). Female enrolments consisted of 318 students and Male enrolments consisted of 330 students; Indigenous enrolments accounted for a total of 7% and 36% of students had a language background other than English.

== Notable alumni ==
- Alex Hartmann, sprinter.

== Heritage listing ==
The Brisbane City Council listed the school on the Brisbane Heritage Register as a Local Heritage Place on 1 July 2003, with the citation being created in October 2012. Even though the school was listed in 2003, and the citation was created in 2012, the significance of the school is assessed under the local heritage criteria, which is based on the Brisbane City Plan 2014.

It follows four of the criteria, these being the historical significance (Criterion A), representation of the local area (Criterion D), aesthetic (Criterion E), and social significance (Criterion G).

=== Criteria A – Historical significance ===
To meet the historical significance criteria, the site should illustrate its role in shaping the region's evolution and historical patterns. It meets this guideline due to the remnants of the original school (which burned down in 1966) surviving through the Arbor Day trees, which were planted after the schools opening in 1925 and well into the 1930s.

=== Criteria D – Representation ===
To meet the representation criteria, the site should signify its importance in showcasing the cultural characteristics of the region. It meets this criterion due to the Arbor Day trees being of different species then the surrounding vegetation, signifying the popular usage of certain plants in gardens from differing decades (in this case the 1920s and 1930s).

=== Criteria E – Aesthetic ===
To meet the aesthetic criteria, the site should showcase how the place is significant in aesthetics within the region. It meets this criterion due to the Arbor Day trees providing aesthetic shade cover for the school and the surrounding area, while naturally blocking noise pollution from the busy Sandgate and Roscommon Roads.

=== Criteria G – Social significance ===
To meet the social significance criteria, the site should identify that it has a significant connection with local communities and/or there associated cultural groups, either through social, cultural, or spiritual connections. It meets this criterion due to the local schoolchildren uniting to plant the Arbor Day trees to adhere to a nineteenth century environmental policy brought upon by the Queensland Government.

== See also ==
- Education in Queensland
- List of schools in Greater Brisbane
