= Brookside Shopping Centre =

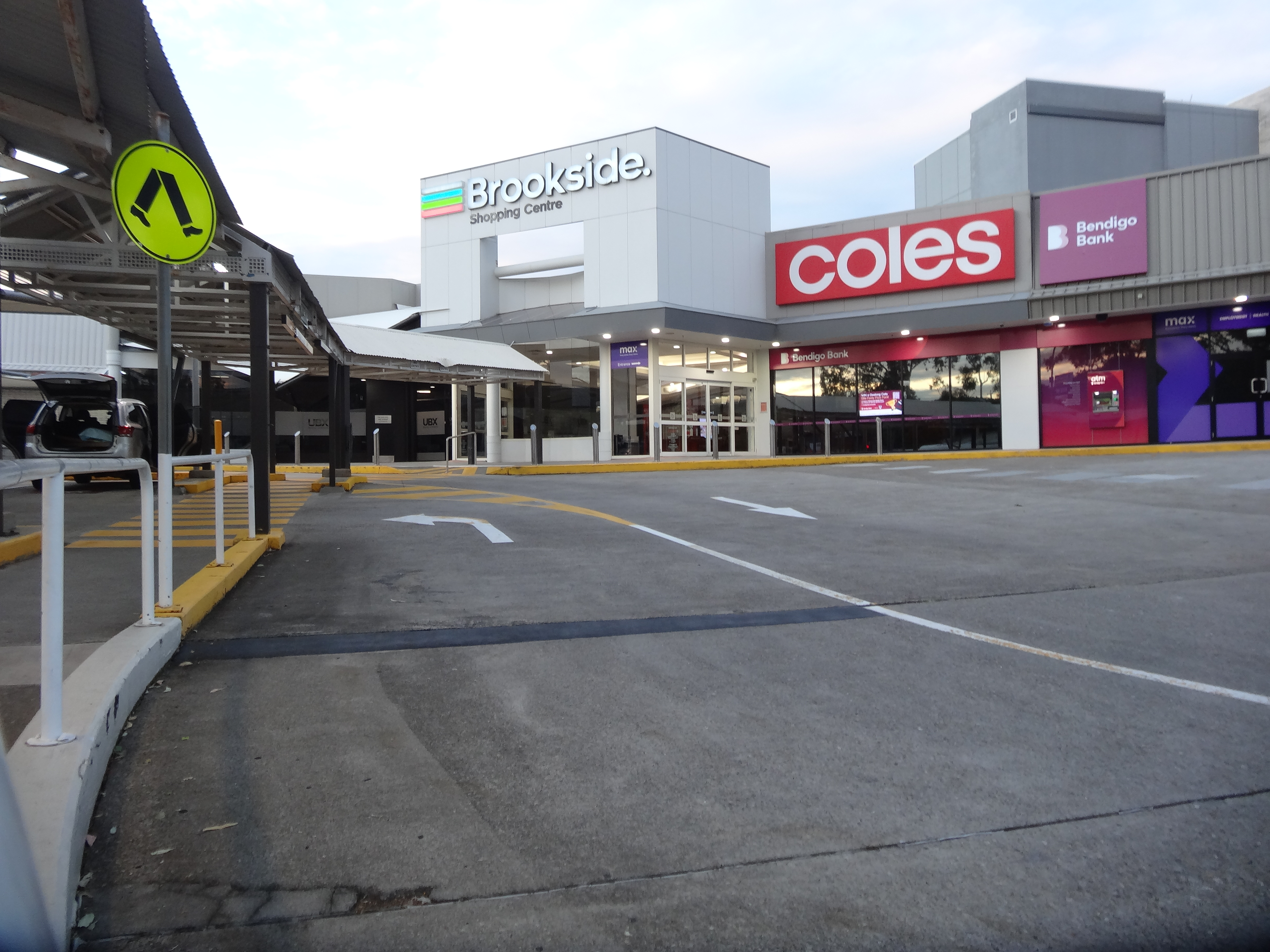
- Southern Entrance
- Location: Mitchelton, Brisbane Australia
- Coordinates: 27°24′32″S 152°58′46″E
- Opened: 1971; 55 years ago
- Manager: Retail First
- Owner: Yu Feng
- Num. of stores: 120
- Num. of anchor tenants: 4
- Floor area: 48,735 m^{2} (524,580 sq ft)
- Floors: 1
- Website: brookside.com.au

Brookside Shopping Centre is the largest shopping centre in Brisbane's north-west, situated in Mitchelton, a suburb of Brisbane, Queensland, Australia.

== History ==
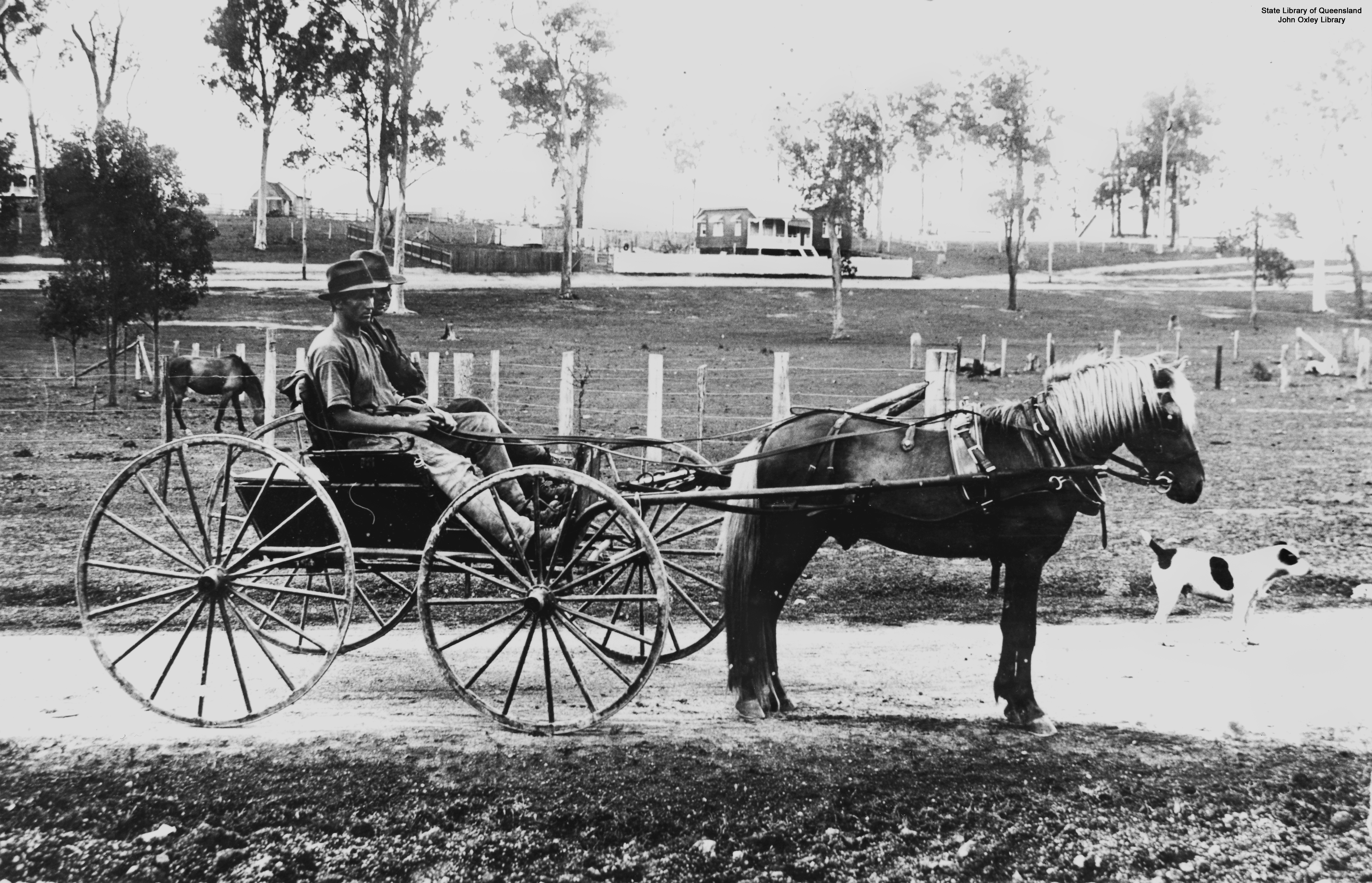
Bell's paddock, c. 1920

The centre is built upon Bell's Paddock, which was the site where several Queensland units of the Australian Imperial Force were raised and trained during World War I. This included units such as the 41st Battalion AIF in 1916.

The centre first opened in 1971 as one of the first major shopping centres in Brisbane's northern suburbs and underwent significant changes in the late 1980s, with the development of the two malls and Target discount department store (which closed in 2013 to make way for a Big W store) on the western side of the centre. Another mall was constructed adjacent to the Woolworths mall. In 2017, Brookside's 3-level Myer store, which had been the centre's flagship store since the initial opening in 1971, closed permanently and Target later reopened on level one of the Myer.

== Retailers ==
Brookside Shopping Centre is home to around 120 specialty stores. Major retailers include:

- TK Maxx (former Myer Level 1 site)
- Target (former Myer Ground Level site)
- Big W (former Target site)
- Coles (former IGA site)
- Woolworths is near the "Coffee Club" & "Price Attack" stores.

Additionally, a The Reject Shop discount variety store is located in the former Mitre 10 & Crazy Clark's building at the rear of the centre.

The centre did have a small food court with around nine food vendors, mostly small businesses. This site however has now become the new home for Cotton On Mega.

There is also McDonald's restaurant located in the front car park, plus The Brook Hotel which is located in the northern side car park of the centre.

== Transport ==
The centre contains the Brookside Bus Station, which provides frequent services to the City, Chermside, Ferny Grove, Toombul, Toowong, Everton Park, Stafford and other suburbs. Mitchelton railway station is also a short walk from the centre, providing services to Ferny Grove, Brisbane City and Beenleigh.

== See also ==
- List of shopping centres in Australia
