= Boondall =

Suburb of Brisbane, Australia

- Suburb
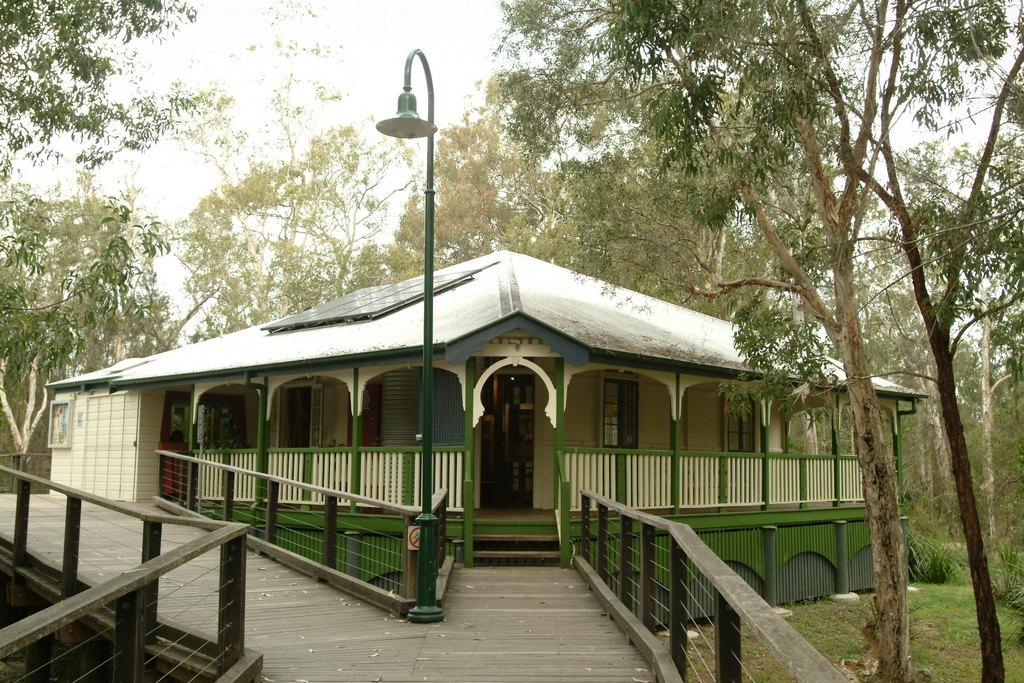
- Boondall Wetlands visitor centre

- Interactive map of Boondall
- Coordinates: 27.3463°S 153.0705°E
- Country: Australia
- State: Queensland
- City: Brisbane
- LGA: City of Brisbane (Deagon Ward)
- Location: 15.1 km (9.4 mi) NNE of Brisbane CBD

Government
  - State electorate: Nudgee
  - Federal division: Lilley

Area
  - Total: 11.0 km^{2} (4.2 sq mi)

Population
  - Total: 9,603 (2021 census)
  - Density: 873/km^{2} (2,261/sq mi)
- Time zone: UTC+10:00 (AEST)
- Postcode: 4034
Suburbs around Boondall
Taigum	Deagon	Sandgate; Shorncliffe
Zillmere	Boondall	Nudgee Beach
Geebung	Virginia; Banyo	Nudgee

Boondall (/ˈbuːndəl/ BOON-dəl) is a northern suburb in the City of Brisbane, Queensland, Australia. It was formerly known as Cabbage Tree Creek (after the creek that flows through the area). In the 2021 census, Boondall had a population of 9,603 people.

== Geography ==
Situated approximately 13.5 kilometres (8.4 mi) north of Brisbane near Moreton Bay, almost halfway between Brisbane and the coastal city of Redcliffe. Bounded on the north by Deagon, Sandgate and Shorncliffe, on the east by Nudgee and Nudgee Beach, on the south by Banyo, Geebung and Virginia and on the west by Taigum and Zillmere.

The borders of Boondall are defined by loosely following the Cabbage Tree Creek (Tighgum) to the north and then following down Muller Road in the west. When Muller Road intersects with Zillmere Road, it forms a corner near Zillmere Water Holes in the south and follow the creek to its connection with Nundah Creek and use Nundah Creek as a border back up to the Cabbage Tree Creek estuary completing the border.

The Boondall Wetlands are located in the east of the suburb. These internationally significant wetlands contain more than 1000 hectares of protected area that provide habitat to a wide range of animals including more than 190 species of birds.

== History ==
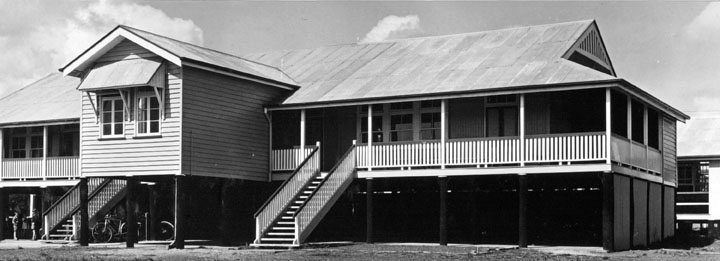
New classroom and teachers room, Boondall State School, April 1951

The name of Boondall is derived from an Aboriginal word meaning either crooked creek or cunjevoi (Alocasia macrorrhiza). The Turrbal people of north Brisbane were the original owners of the country around the Boondall Wetlands.

St Joseph's Nudgee College was established in January 1891 by the Christian Brothers, a Roman Catholic order. The site for the college was chosen by Ambrose Treacy after the Archbishop of Brisbane Robert Dunne asked that the Brothers establish a boarding school for Catholic boys from rural areas.

In January 1916, the Zillmere congregation of the Church of Christ commenced outreach in the Nudgee College area, erecting a bush shelter. On 23 December 1916, a chapel was built in a day by volunteers. In 1957, a new church building was erected and the old church building was used as a hall.

Boondall State School opened on 6 April 1925.

St Matthew's Anglican church at 178 Lyndhurst Road (27.3478°S 153.0616°E) was dedicated on 21 September 1974 by Archbishop Arnott. It closed circa 1988. The property was purchased by Turbert Bhagwan Ram Dutta and his mother Gayatri Dutta with a view to using it as a Hindu temple. The local Hindu community supported the plan and the Hindu Society of Queensland was incorporated on 22 January 1992 and took over the ownership of the property. The Gayatri Mandir was officially opened and blessed on Sunday 26 January 1992.

In 1975, Boondall Methodist Church was at 2218 Sandgate Road (approx 27.3471°S 153.0597°E), becoming Boondall Uniting Church after the amalgamation of the Methodist Church into the Uniting Church in Australia in 1977. In June 1990 the Uniting Church in Australia congregations of Boondall, Brighton, Sandgate and Shorncliffe decided to amalgamate. Their new Sandgate Uniting Church in Deagon was opened in Sunday 20 November 1994.

The Brisbane Entertainment Centre was built by the Brisbane City Council and opened on Thursday 20 February 1986 with the first event being ice dancers Torvill and Dean. On 1 July 2002, the ownership was transferred to Stadiums Queensland. It has been operated since 1986 by ASM Global (formerly AEG Ogden Brisbane Pty Ltd).

== Demographics ==
In the 2016 census, Boondall recorded a population of 9,217 people, 49.4% female and 50.6% male. Aboriginal and Torres Strait Islander people made up 2.5% of the population. The median age of the Boondall population was 37 years of age, 1 year below the Australian median. 68.7% of people living in Boondall were born in Australia, compared to the national average of 66.7%; the next most common countries of birth were New Zealand 5.3%, India 4.1%, England 2.2%, Philippines 2.1% and Fiji 1.3%. 77.0% of people only spoke English at home. Other languages spoken at home included Punjabi 2.7%, Hindi 1.2%, Mandarin 1.2%, Cantonese 1.1% and Italian 1.1%. The most common responses for religion were Catholic 30.3%, No Religion 25.4% and Anglican 11.6%.

In the 2021 census, Boondall had a population of 9,603 people.

== Heritage listings ==
Boondall has a number of heritage-listed sites, including:

- Church of Christ Hall (also known as Boondall Church of Christ), 23 Carlyle Road
- Railway footbridge (also known as the former Boondall Station pedestrian footbridge), 11 Peacock Street
- St Joseph's Nudgee College, 2199 Sandgate Road
- Boondall State School's Arbor Day trees, 2210 Sandgate Road
- Cabbage Tree Creek railway bridge, adjacent to Sandgate Road (27.3358°S 153.0600°E)

== Education ==
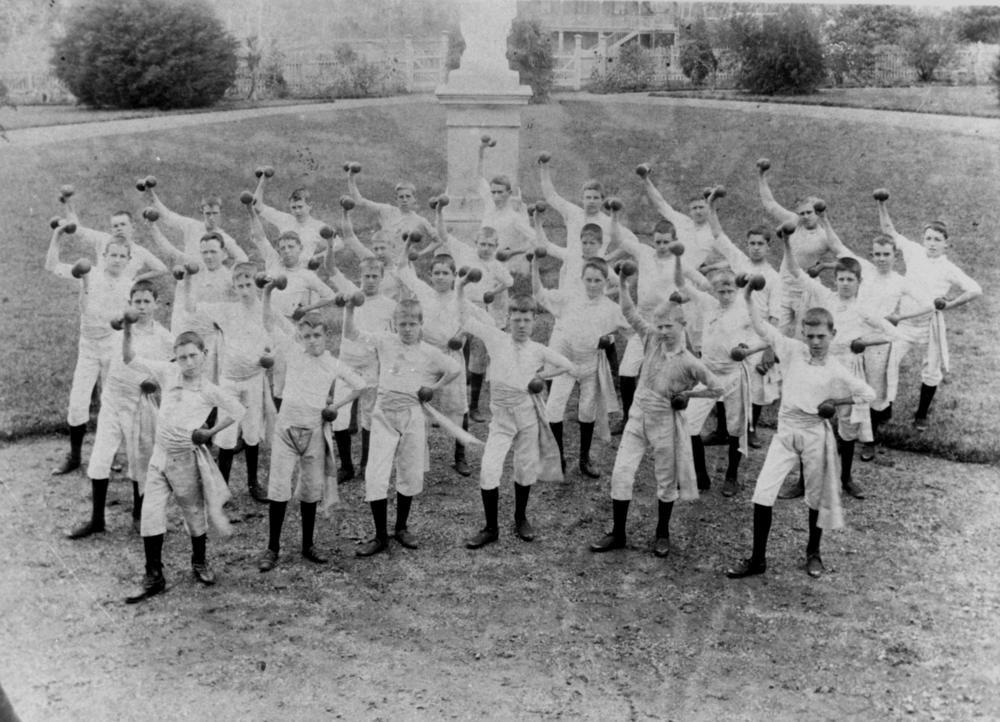
Dumbbell drill on the front lawn of Nudgee College, 1898

Boondall State School is a government primary (Prep–6) school for boys and girls on the corner of Sandgate Road and Roscommon Road (27.3484°S 153.0593°E). It includes a special education program. In 2018, the school had an enrolment of 681 students with 48 teachers (43 full-time equivalent) and 38 non-teaching staff (22 full-time equivalent). In 2022, the school had 654 students with 49 teachers (43 full-time equivalent) and 31 non-teaching staff (18 full-time equivalent).

St Joseph's Nudgee College is a Catholic primary and secondary (5–12) school for boys at 2199 Sandgate Road (27.3599°S 153.0621°E). The school's name reflects that, although it is within the southern part of Boondall, the location was formerly within the suburb boundaries of Nudgee. In 2018, the school had an enrolment of 1,586 students with 130 teachers (128 full-time equivalent) and 115 non-teaching staff (91 full-time equivalent). In 2022, the school had 1,719 students with 144 teachers (142.2 full-time equivalent) and 121 non-teaching staff (99.6 full-time equivalent).

There are no government secondary schools in Boondall. The nearest government secondary schools are Sandgate District State High School in neighbouring Deagon to the north and Aspley State High School in Aspley to the west.

== Amenities ==
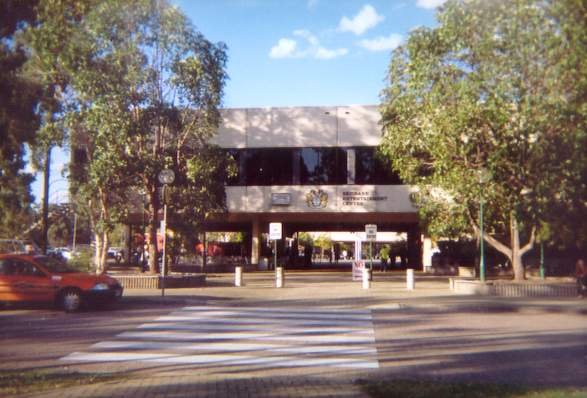
Brisbane Entertainment Centre, 2001

Close to the Boondall railway station is the Brisbane Entertainment Centre, where many live entertainment shows are held.

The suburb is also home to the Ice World Boondall, where the Brisbane Blue Tongues of the AIHL used to play before relocating to Bundall Iceland on the Gold Coast.

There are a number of parks in the suburb, including:

- Barlow Place Park (27.3422°S 153.0569°E)
- Boondall Park (27.3382°S 153.0573°E)
- Boondall Wetlands (27.3429°S 153.0800°E)
- Boondall Wetlands Western Extension (27.3514°S 153.0761°E)
- Donna Philp Park (27.3539°S 153.0664°E)
- Eton Avenue Park (27.3519°S 153.0711°E)
- Frank Sleeman Park (27.3613°S 153.0588°E)
- Gildor Street Park (27.3487°S 153.0564°E)
- Jalomy Street Park (27.3513°S 153.0598°E)
- Keppel Street Park (27.3443°S 153.0552°E)
- Laar Crescent Park (27.3581°S 153.0578°E)
- Lambert Mcbride Park (27.3581°S 153.0508°E)
- Mulbeam Park (27.3517°S 153.0541°E)
- Northumbria Road Park (27.3575°S 153.0744°E)
- Roghan Road Park (no.2260) (27.3451°S 153.0596°E)
- Wahl Street Park (27.3465°S 153.0549°E)
