= Deagon =

- Suburb
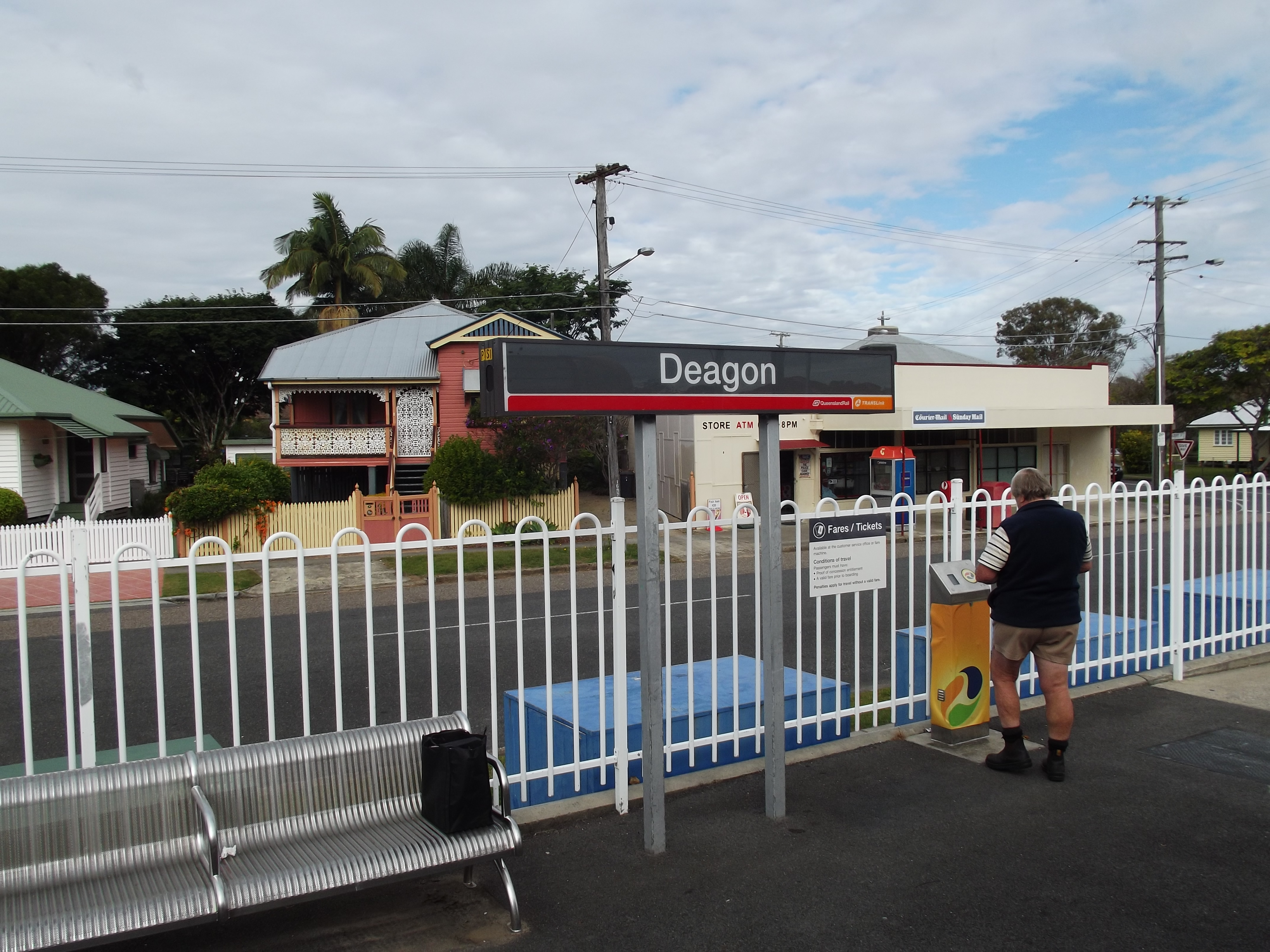
- Deagon Railway Station, Queensland, June 2012

- Interactive map of Deagon
- Coordinates: 27.3283°S 153.0599°E
- Country: Australia
- State: Queensland
- City: Brisbane
- LGA: City of Brisbane (Deagon Ward)
- Location: 18.6 km (11.6 mi) NNE of Brisbane CBD

Government
  - State electorate: Sandgate
  - Federal divisions: Lilley; Petrie

Area
  - Total: 3.0 km^{2} (1.2 sq mi)

Population
  - Total: 3,773 (2021 census)
  - Density: 1,258/km^{2} (3,260/sq mi)
- Time zone: UTC+10:00 (AEST)
- Postcode: 4017
Suburbs around Deagon
| Bracken Ridge | Sandgate | Sandgate |
| Fitzgibbon | Deagon | Sandgate |
| Taigum | Boondall | Boondall |

Deagon is an outer northern suburb in the City of Brisbane, Queensland, Australia. In the 2021 census, Deagon had a population of 3,773 people.

== Geography ==
Deagon is 18 kilometres (11 mi) north of the CBD.

The Gateway Arterial Road runs through the western side of the suburb.

Deagon has a flat topography with one of its boundaries being Cabbage Tree Creek. The Creek's catchment is largely urbanised but the Boondall Wetlands, which is separated from Deagon by the Creek, plays an important role in providing essential habitat for a range of birds and animals, including migratory birds, which make their way from the arctic circle. The Boondall Wetlands near Deagon have ecosystems that are fresh as well as areas that are salt water. The smaller reserves such as Brighton and Deagon Wetlands are fresh water only. The Deagon Wetland is an important remnant of tea tree woodland on a 50ha site. Notable bird species include the striped honeyeater and the white-cheeked honeyeater.

== History ==
The Jagera and Turrbal groups occupied land in the Brisbane and Ipswich areas. The exact boundaries are not known; however, the Turrbal generally occupied the area north of the Brisbane River. Both groups had closely related languages which are classified as belonging to the larger Yaggera language group. In nearby Shorncliffe the Ningy-Ningy clan had displaced the Turrbal by the 1850s.

The area has a rich Aboriginal history. Evidence of Aboriginal occupation can be found in a bora ring at Nudgee Waterhole; in sites of special importance at Dinah Island near Nundah; and by Aboriginal camps on the banks of the Cabbage Tree Creek.

The suburb was named after its railway station, which in turn was named in 1887 after William Deagon, who was Mayor of Sandgate from 1882 to 1884. William Deagon was an old identity of the area, and his name was used for the locality when the railway line went through in 1887. He owned the Sandgate Hotel, a stopping place for the Cobb & Co. coaches. Deagon Street, the racecourse, the railway station and the Deagon Wetlands all bear his name.

Deagon Baptist Mission Church opened in 1918. It was on a block of land near Deagon railway station and a stump-capping ceremony was held in September 1918.

Deagon Post Office opened on 18 June 1947 at Mr Torpie's store next to the railway station.

Sandgate District State High School opened in 1959. When the Minister of Education Jack Pizzey officially opened it in 1961, he said the school, which had an elaborate man-made lake in its grounds, was one of the most attractive in Queensland. Extensions were then completed four years after that. In the 1980s a performance hall and library building were added and then, in 2001–03, under the secondary school renewal program, a modern sports hall and home economics block.

On Sunday 20 November 1994 the current Sandgate Uniting Church building was officially opened and dedicated by Reverend Donald W. Whebell, Moderator of the Queensland Synod of the Uniting Church in Australia. It brings together the Uniting congregations of Boondall, Brighton, Sandgate and Shorncliffe, a decision made by those congregations in June 1990.

In May 2012, the Sandgate Baptist congregation merged with the Geebung Baptist congregation and established a new church, Connect Baptist Church at 21 Braun Street, Deagon.

== Demographics ==
In the 2011 census, the population of Deagon was 3,460,

In the 2016 census, Deagon had a population of 3,675 people, 51.1% female and 48.9% male. The median age of the Deagon population was 42 years of age, 4 years above the Australian median. 75.7% of people living in Deagon were born in Australia, compared to the national average of 66.7%; the next most common countries of birth were England 3.9%, New Zealand 2.2%, Philippines 0.3%, Ireland 0.3%, Germany 0.4%. 87.3% of people spoke only English at home; the next most popular languages were 0.5% Tagalog, 0.4% Samoan, 0.4% Dutch, 0.4% Mandarin, 0.3% Japanese. 14.3% of Deagon residents were born overseas and 8.8% speak a language other than English at home. This compares with 28.9% for Queensland as a whole. The most common foreign languages spoken were Tagalog, Samoan, Dutch, Mandarin and Japanese. 2.5% were of Aboriginal or Torres Strait Islander descent, compared to 4.0% for Queensland.

In the 2021 census, Deagon had a population of 3,773 people.

== Education ==
There is no primary school within Deagon; the nearest one is in Sandgate with other primary schools in other neighbouring suburbs.

Sandgate District State High School is a government secondary (7–12) school for boys and girls at 41 Braun Street (27.3290°S 153.0572°E). In 2017, the school had an enrolment of 1,056 students with 93 teachers (86 full-time equivalent) and 46 non-teaching staff (32 full-time equivalent). It includes a special education program.

== Amenities ==
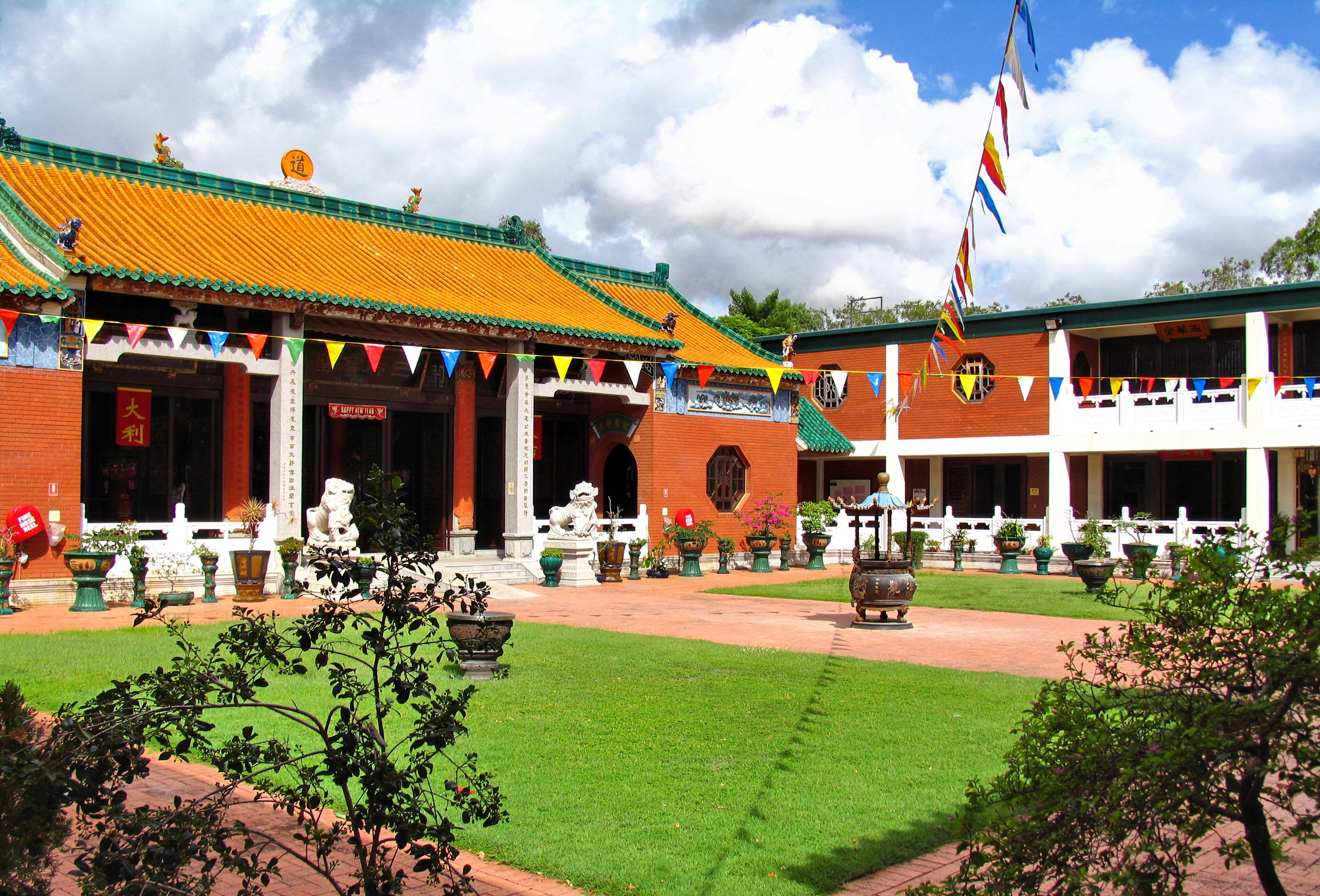
Green Pine Taoist Temple, 2007

A Queensland Racing training facility, Deagon Racecourse, lies to the north of the suburb. Horse racing in Deagon ceased in 1941, but the racecourse remains a first rate training establishment. The Bligh government intended to make the racecourse the centre for all greyhound racing in Brisbane (replacing Albion Park Raceway) but this plan was cancelled in February 2012.

The (Evergreen) Ching Chung Taoist Temple sits next to the Gateway Arterial Road. It was built at Deagon in 1991. There are three Halls which were built according to Taoist beliefs. The three halls are: The Hall of Three Purities, the Hall of Three Masters and the Hall of the Spiritual Garden. There is also a Memorial Hall of Ancestors.

Sandgate Uniting Church is at 116 Board Street (27.3255°S 153.0589°E).

== Transport ==
Deagon can be easily accessed via Sandgate Road and the Gateway Motorway. Deagon also has a railway line with three stations easily accessed by Deagon residents: North Boondall, Deagon, and Sandgate. Deagon also has a variety of bus services operated by Transport for Brisbane and Hornibrook Bus Lines. All public transport services in Deagon are operated under Translink Including school bus services operated by Thompson Bus Lines.

== Notable residents ==
- Kerri-Anne Kennerley, television celebrity, attended Sandgate District State High School
- Susan Kiefel, High Court of Australia judge, attended Sandgate District State High School (leaving at age 15 in Year 10)
- Wendy Turnbull OBE, international tennis player, attended Sandgate District State High School
