= Fitzgibbon, Queensland =

Fitzgibbon
- Suburb
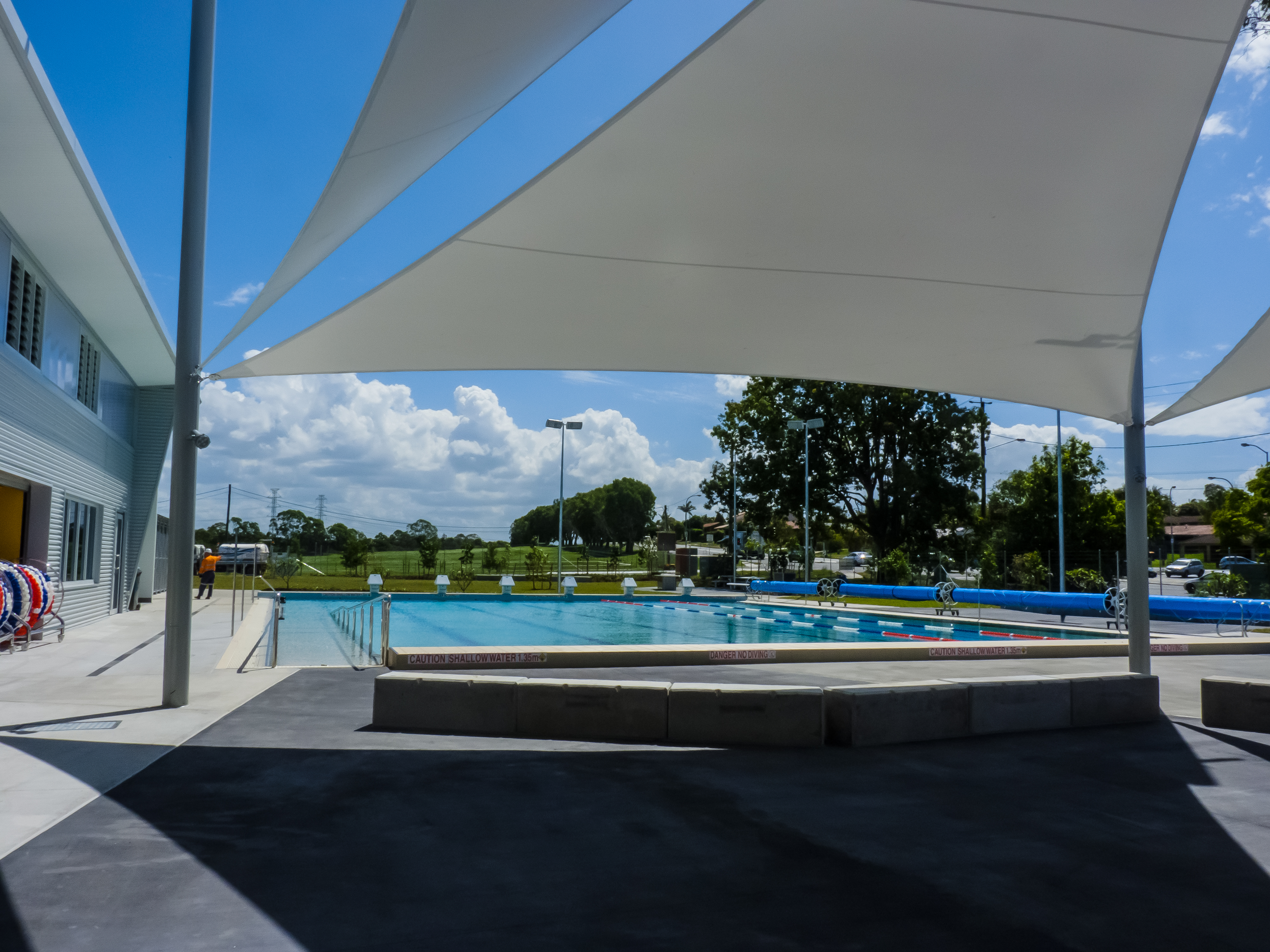
- Bracken Ridge swimming pool

- Interactive map of Fitzgibbon
- Coordinates: 27.34°S 153.0344°E
- Country: Australia
- State: Queensland
- City: Brisbane
- LGA: City of Brisbane (Bracken Ridge Ward)
- Location: 16.5 km (10.3 mi) N of Brisbane CBD

Government
  - State electorate: Sandgate
  - Federal division: Petrie

Area
  - Total: 3.1 km^{2} (1.2 sq mi)

Population
  - Total: 6,296 (2021 census)
  - Density: 2,030/km^{2} (5,260/sq mi)
- Time zone: UTC+10:00 (AEST)
- Postcode: 4018
Suburbs around Fitzgibbon
| Bald Hills | Bracken Ridge | Deagon |
| Carseldine | Fitzgibbon | Taigum |
| Carseldine | Zillmere | Zillmere |

Fitzgibbon is a northern suburb in the City of Brisbane, Queensland, Australia. In the 2021 census, Fitzgibbon had a population of 6,296 people.

== Geography ==
The suburb is one of the smallest suburbs in Brisbane. The suburb is roughly triangular in shape, and is bounded by the North Coast railway, Cabbage Tree Creek, and Telegraph Road. It was subdivided for residential use in the 1980s and 1990s.

== History ==
The suburb was named after Abram Fitzgibbon, who was the chief engineer of railways in Queensland in the 1860s.

The area was previously the site of a council landfill. The landfill was first opened on 1 December 1981, and was located on Telegraph Road (now the Bill Brown Sports Reserve). On 14 January 1985, the site was closed and moved further south to Roghan Road (now the site of the Hidden World playground). It operated until 30 September 1995.

Holy Spirit College opened in 2022.

== Demographics ==
In the 2016 census, Fitzgibbon had a population of 5,656 people, 52.4% female and 47.6% male. The median age of the Fitzgibbon population was 33 years of age, 5 years below the Australian median. 54.9% of people living in Fitzgibbon were born in Australia, compared to the national average of 66.7%. The next most common countries of birth were India 9.6%, New Zealand 5.0%, Philippines 4.4%, England 2.8%, China 2.1%. 61.0% of people spoke only English at home; the next most popular languages were 3.5% Punjabi, 2.7% Hindi, 2.2% Tagalog, 2.2% Cantonese, 2.1% Mandarin.

In the 2021 census, Fitzgibbon had a population of 6,296 people.

== Education ==
Holy Spirit College is a Catholic secondary (Years 7 to 12) school for boys and girls at 441 Beams Road (27.3487°S 153.0329°E). It was opened in 2022 initially offering Year 7 schooling. The school has been planned to accommodate up to 900 students once all years of secondary schooling are offered.

There are no government schools in Fitzgibbon. The nearest government primary schools are in neighbouring Taigum and Bracken Ridge. The nearest government secondary schools are Sandgate District State High School in neighbouring Deagon and Aspley State High School in Aspley.

== Amenities ==
There is a small shopping strip located between 524-530 Roghan Road, which features a medical clinic, a convenience store, bakery, spice shop, as well as a variety of multicultural dining options. It is located opposite the Fitzgibbon Community Centre, which is a family friendly learning and social inclusion hub.

=== Parks ===
There are a number of parks, including

- Beams Road Park (27.3516°S 153.0339°E)
- Bill Brown Sports Reserve (27.3352°S 153.0355°E)
- Cambridge Crescent Park (27.3386°S 153.0400°E)
- Iris Place Park (27.3447°S 153.0343°E)
- Kakadu Circuit Park (27.3518°S 153.0347°E)
- Pine Tree Close Park (27.3428°S 153.0393°E)
- Silkyoak Circuit Park (27.3460°S 153.0309°E)

=== Sports ===
The Emily Seebohm Aquatic Centre is located on the border between Bracken Ridge and Fitzgibbon, which was officially opened on 14 February 2016, based at 523 Telegraph Road. The pool offers swimming lessons, squad programs and aqua aerobics. It is named after notable resident, Emily Seebohm, as a result of a naming competition for the public pool held by the city council prior to its official opening.
