= Boondall Wetlands =

Coordinates: 27.344°S 153.086°E

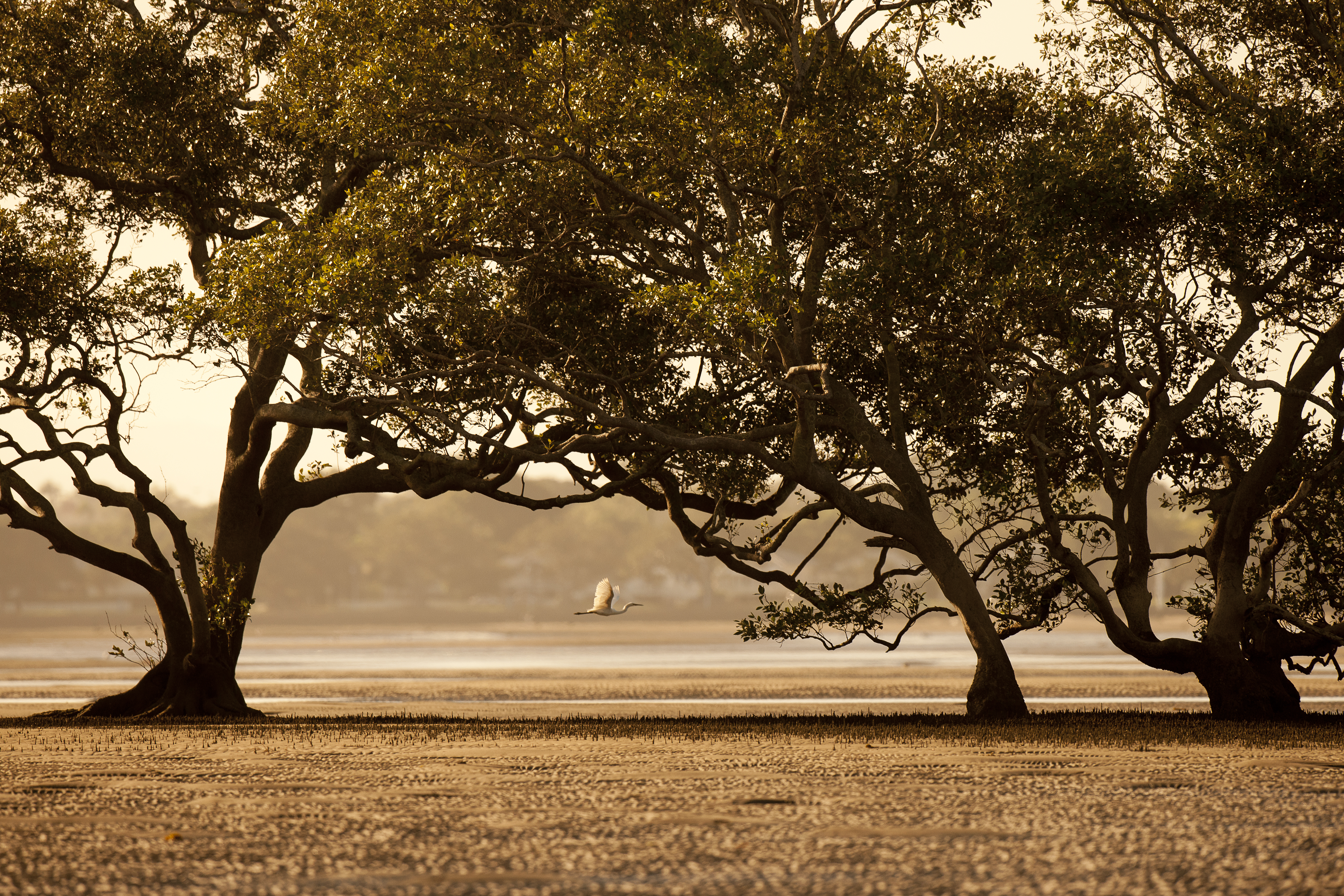
Boondall Wetlands, 2012

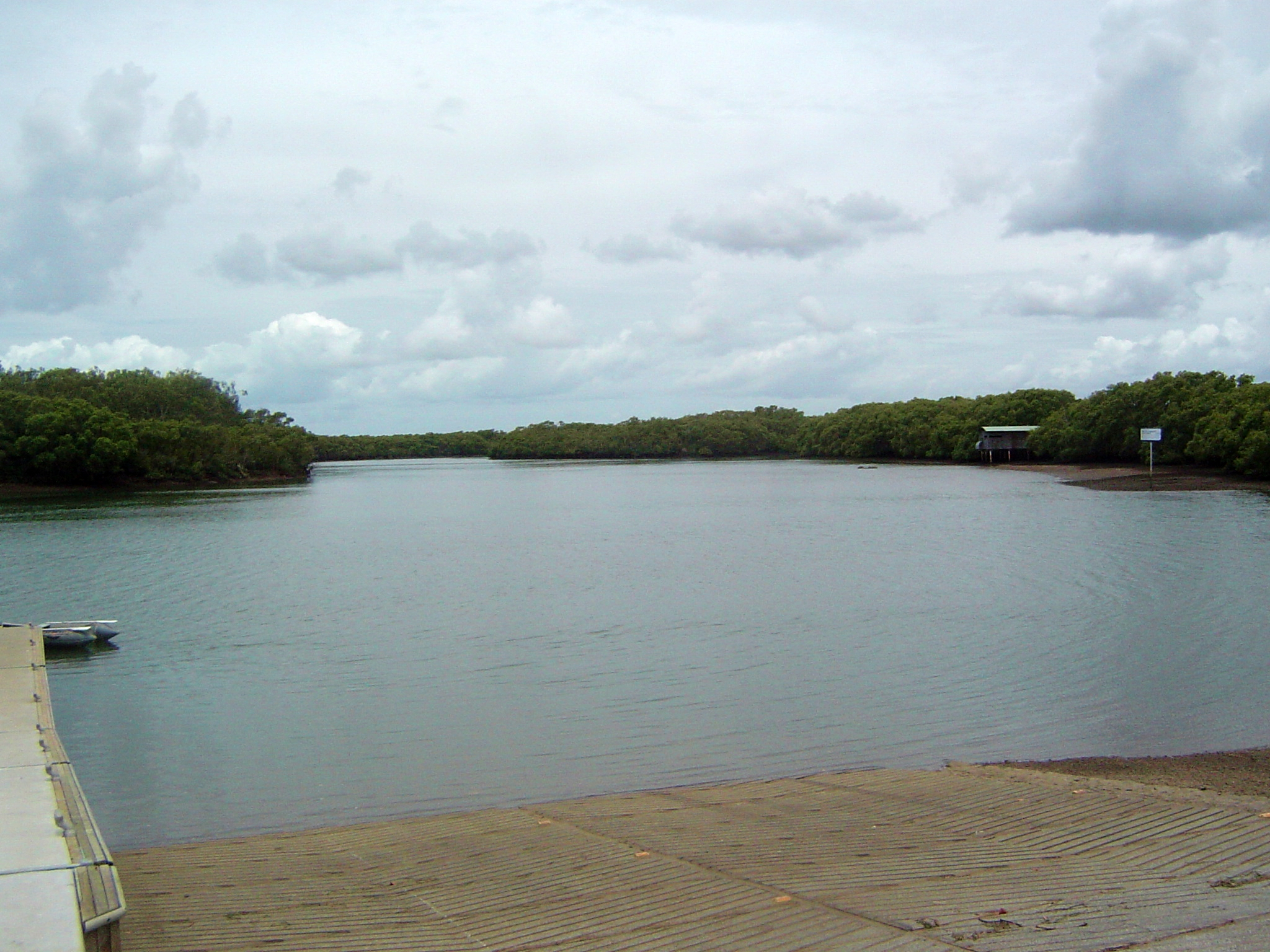
Cabbage Tree Creek marks the northern border of the reserve, 2010

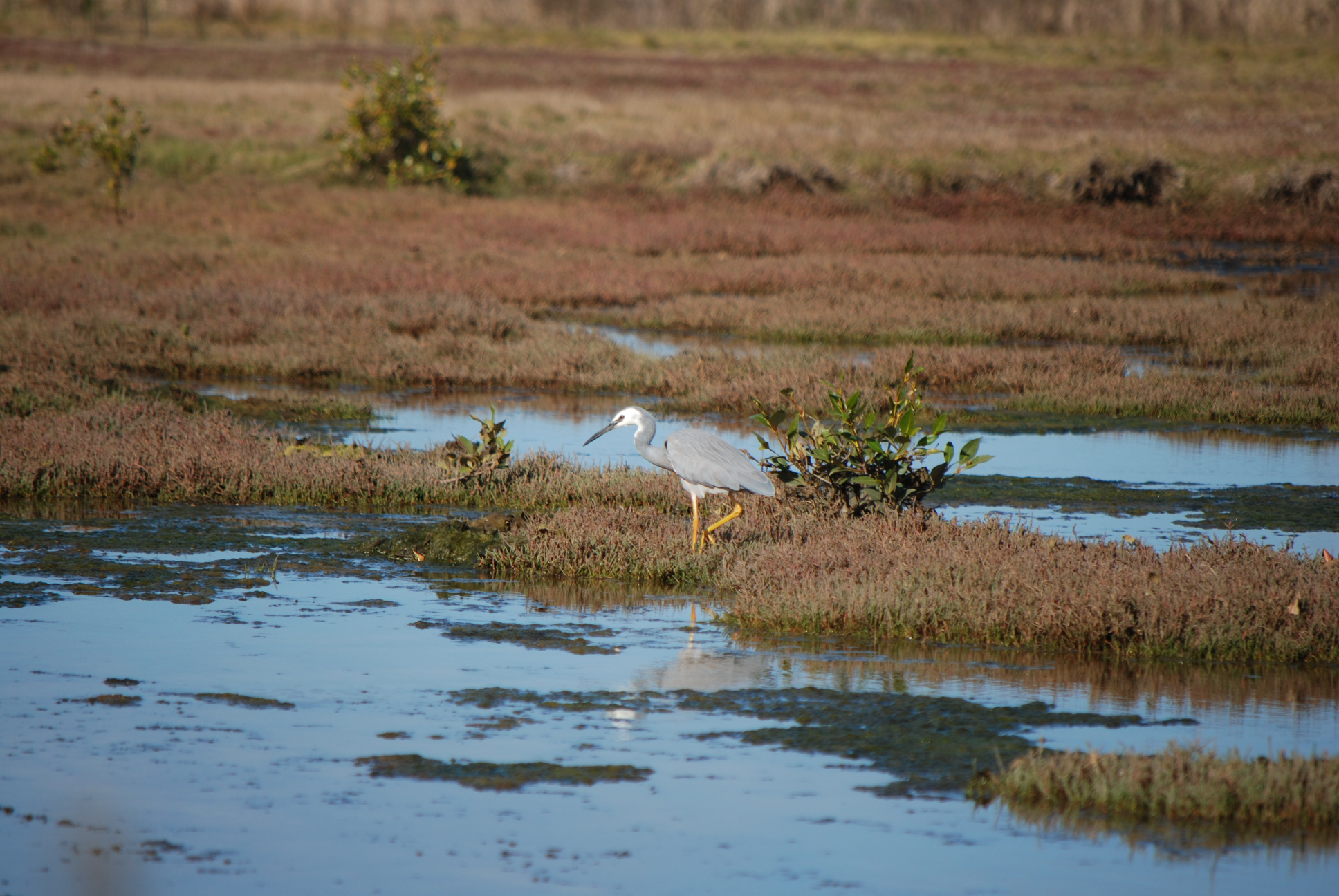
White-faced heron, 2008

The Boondall Wetlands lie on the edge of Moreton Bay in the Brisbane suburb of Boondall between Nudgee Beach and Shorncliffe, in south-east Queensland, Australia. The wetlands are preserved within the Boondall Wetlands Reserve which was preserved in 1990 and covers more than 1100 hectares of internationally significant wetlands.

== Description ==
The Boondall Wetlands are Brisbane's largest wetlands. They became protected under the Ramsar Convention on 22 October 1993. The northern boundary is marked by Cabbage Tree Creek and the Kedron Brook floodway marks the southern limits of the wetlands. Nudgee Creek and the Gateway Motorway both pass through the wetlands, with the latter providing road access to the Boondall Wetlands Environment Centre. Facilities in the park includes elevated walkways, bikeways and bird watching platforms.

== Flora and fauna ==
The reserve supports various vegetation communities including tidal flats, mangroves, freshwater lakes, salt marshes, casuarina forests, melaleuca swamplands, grasslands, open forests, woodlands and remnant rainforest.

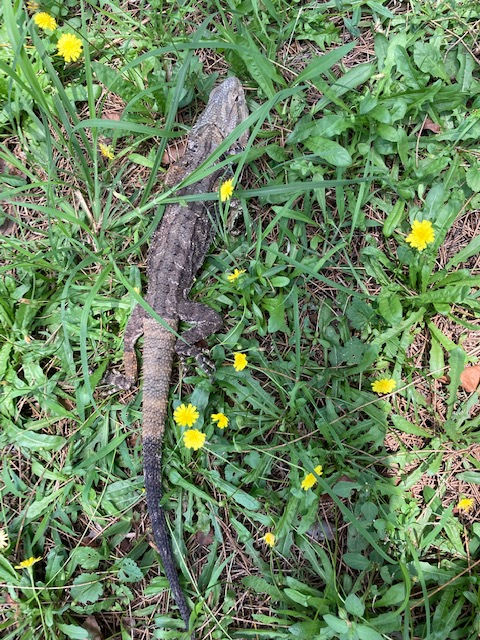
Eastern bearded dragon (Pogona barbata), January 2023

The wetlands support a diversity of wildlife, including invertebrates, fish, reptiles, amphibians, mammals and more than 190 species of birds. Many of the birds are international migratory shorebirds which breed during the northern summer months in Arctic regions, making Boondall Wetlands globally important for these long-distance visitors. The wetlands form part of the Moreton Bay and Pumicestone Passage Important Bird Area.

Some of the migratory species include the Mongolian plover, eastern curlew, grey-tailed tattler and bar-tailed godwit. Other birds seen the reserve include pied oystercatchers, beach thick-knees, darters, little black cormorants, white-faced herons, Australian white ibis, great egrets, grass owls, whistling kites and brahminy kites.

== Facilities ==
Camping in not permitted in the reserve. There is a visitor information centre and walking tracks, including a boardwalk through mangroves. There is a bird hide on Nundah Creek and a boat ramp on Nudgee Beach Road.

== See also ==
- List of parks in Brisbane
- Protected areas of Queensland
