= Bracken Ridge, Queensland =

Bracken Ridge
- Suburb
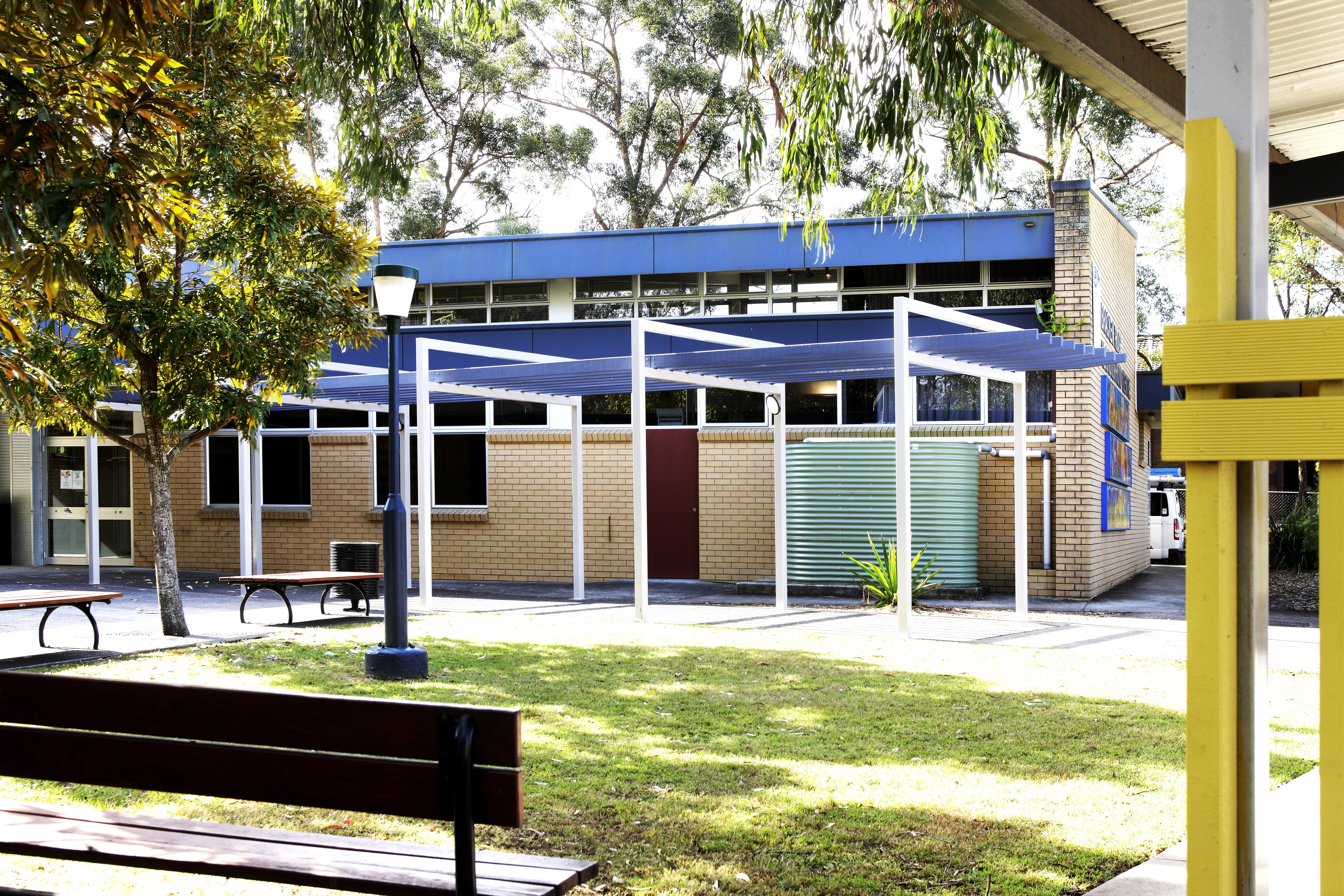
- Bracken Ridge Hall courtyard near the ward office and library, 2011

- Interactive map of Bracken Ridge
- Coordinates: 27.3192°S 153.0344°E
- Country: Australia
- State: Queensland
- City: Brisbane
- LGA: City of Brisbane (Bracken Ridge Ward)
- Location: 18.3 km (11.4 mi) N of Brisbane CBD
- Established: 1960s

Government
  - State electorate: Sandgate
  - Federal division: Petrie

Area
  - Total: 7.9 km^{2} (3.1 sq mi)

Population
  - Total: 17,488 (2021 census)
  - Density: 2,214/km^{2} (5,730/sq mi)
- Time zone: UTC+10:00 (AEST)
- Postcode: 4017
Suburbs around Bracken Ridge
Bald Hills	Brighton	Brighton
Bald Hills	Bracken Ridge	Sandgate
Fitzgibbon	Taigum	Deagon

Bracken Ridge is a northern suburb in the City of Brisbane, Queensland, Australia. In the 2021 census, Bracken Ridge had a population of 17,488 people.

== Geography ==
The suburb is located about 18 kilometres (11 mi) north of the Brisbane central business district. The southern border is formed by Telegraph Road, one of the oldest roads in the suburb, and a portion of the western border is formed by the Caboolture railway line. A number of housing estates are located within the suburb, including The Oaks, Enbrook Heights and the most recent development Sungate Estate.

The terrain in the suburb is, as the name suggests, generally hilly. The highest area of the suburb features a park and a reservoir; from this height it is quite easy to see Moreton Bay to the east and the CBD to the south.

== History ==
The Turrbul people are the traditional owners of the area.

The suburb takes its name from a property name and later an estate name, which in turn was a name given by the original settlers because there was so much Bracken fern.

The first land sales in the area occurred on 3 August 1857, with the first purchase being made by William Loudon. John McPherson and James Ferguson bought land at the next land auction on 28 April 1862 and were the first to buy and settle on the land.

Bracken Ridge State School opened on 26 August 1957.

Nashville State High School opened on 23 January 1967. On 25 September 2000 it was renamed Bracken Ridge State High School.

Norris Road State School opened on 24 January 1977.

St Joseph's Catholic Primary School opened on 28 January 1978.

St John Fisher College opened on 5 October 1981.

The Bracken Ridge Library opened in 1987.

The Anglican Church of the Holy Spirit was dedicated on 7 May 1988 by Archbishop John Grindrod.

The Bracken Ridge Gospel Hall was built in the mid-1990s at 294 Bracken Ridge Road (27.3130°S 153.0386°E). It was affiliated with the Christian Community Churches of Australia. In 2014 the site was sold for $1.32 million and no longer operates as a church.

== Demographics ==
In the 2016 census, Bracken Ridge recorded a population of 16,936 people, 51% female and 49% male. The median age of the Bracken Ridge population was 36 years of age, 2 years below the Australian median, and 1 year below Queensland median. Children aged 0 – 14 years made up 20.4% of the population and people aged 65 years and over made up 13.1% of the population Of people in Bracken Ridge 51.8% were married, this higher than the State and National level. 72.6% of people living in Bracken Ridge were born in Australia. The other top responses for country of birth were New Zealand 4.6%, England 3.3%, India 2.9% Philippines 2.5%, Fiji 0.8%. 82.0% of people only spoke English at home. Other languages spoken at home included Punjabi 1.4%, Tagalog 1.4%, Hindi 1.2%, Malayalam 1.0% and Filipino 0.7%.

In the 2021 census, Bracken Ridge had a population of 17,488 people, 50.6% female and 49.4% male. The median age of the Bracken Ridge population was 37 years of age, 1 year below the Australian median of 38. 72.3% of people living in Bracken Ridge were born in Australia. The other top responses for country of birth were New Zealand 4.2%, India 4.0%, England 3.2%. the Philippines 2.4% and Fiji 0.7%. 80.0% of people spoke only English at home; the next most common languages were 2.6% Punjabi, 1.2% Tagalog, 1.1% Hindi, 0.9% Malayalam and 0.9% Arabic.

== Heritage listings ==
Bracken Ridge has a few heritage-listed sites, including:

- Sandgate Third Lagoon, 83 Barfoot Street
- Bald Hills Cemetery, 225 Barrett Street

== Education ==
Bracken Ridge State School is a government primary (Prep–6) school for boys and girls at 1 Binburra Street (27.3251°S 153.0420°E). In 2018, the school had an enrolment of 366 students with 32 teachers (26 full-time equivalent) and 23 non-teaching staff (12 full-time equivalent). It includes a special education program.

Norris Road State School is a government primary (Prep–6) school for boys and girls at 28 Greenore Street (27.3166°S 153.0250°E). In 2018, the school had an enrolment of 688 students with 57 teachers (49 full-time equivalent) and 35 non-teaching staff (24 full-time equivalent). It includes a special education program.

St Joseph's Catholic Primary School is a Catholic primary (Prep–6) school for boys and girls at 30 Eldorado Street (27.3250°S 153.0344°E). In 2018, the school had an enrolment of 681 students with 49 teachers (40 full-time equivalent) and 35 non-teaching staff (20 full-time equivalent).

Bracken Ridge State High School is a government secondary (7–12) school for boys and girls at 68 Barfoot Street (27.3073°S 153.0440°E). In 2018, the school had an enrolment of 520 students with 50 teachers (48 full-time equivalent) and 29 non-teaching staff (21 full-time equivalent). It includes a special education program.

St John Fisher College is a Catholic secondary (7–12) school for girls on John Fisher Drive (27.3133°S 153.0438°E). In 2018, the school had an enrolment of 526 students with 48 teachers (45 full-time equivalent) and 26 non-teaching staff (18 full-time equivalent).

Queensland Pathways State College is a secondary (10–12) campus of Queensland Pathways State College (headquartered at Coorparoo) at 157 Norris Road (27.3200°S 153.0253°E).

Jabiru Community College is a private secondary (10–12) school for boys and girls at Community Annexe, Bracken Street (27.3177°S 153.0384°E). In 2018, the school had an enrolment of 78 students with 9 teachers (8 full-time equivalent) and 6 non-teaching staff (5 full-time equivalent).

Brisbane North Institute of TAFE has a campus at Bracken Ridge.

== Amenities ==
Shopping strips are located in Gawain Road and Barrett Street. A more substantial shopping centre is located on the corner of Telegraph Road and Norris Road. There is also a small shopping centre near the Bracken Ridge Tavern incorporating a Woolworths, chemist and a newsagent on Barrett St. There is a pub (The Bracken Ridge Tavern which incorporates 'Phoenix') on the corner of Barrett and Denham Streets, and a sports centre located on Bracken Ridge Road.

The Brisbane City Council operates a public library on the corner of Barrett St and Bracken St, next to Ferguson Park.

=== Sports ===
Bracken Ridge hosts The Emily Seebohm Aquatic Centre which officially opened on 14 February 2016, based at 523 Telegraph Road on the border between Fitzgibbon and Bracken Ridge. The pool offers swimming lessons, squad programs and aqua aerobics. It is named after notable resident, Emily Seebohm, as the winning result of a naming competition for the public pool held by the city council prior to its official opening.

=== Places of worship ===
There are a number of churches in Bracken Ridge, including:

- Anglican Church of the Holy Spirit, 103 Denham Street (27.3251°S 153.0435°E)
- St Joseph's Catholic Church, 30 Eldorado Street (27.3253°S 153.0350°E)
- Bracken Ridge Uniting Church, 7 Pellinore Road (27.3167°S 153.0383°E)
- Bracken Ridge Baptist Church, 47 Norris Road (27.3139°S 153.0277°E)
- Meetinghouse of the Church of Jesus Christ of Latter-day Saints, 16 Lanyon Street (27.3263°S 153.0390°E)

Bray Park Samoan Church meets at Norris Road State School Hall in Norris Road (27.3181°S 153.02446°E). It is part of the Wesleyan Methodist Church.

Bracken Ridge Tongan Church meets at 17 Bracken Street (27.3144°S 153.0389°E). It is part of the Wesleyan Methodist Church.

== Parks ==
Bracken Ridge has a number of parklands and reserves, including:

- Albion Park, on Caulfield Street, Cluden and Doomben Places (27.3256°S 153.0219°E)
- Bald Hills Creek Park (27.3052°S 153.0383°E)
- Barbour Road Park (27.3233°S 153.0191°E)
- Barrett Street Park, accessible via Barrett and Snooker Streets (27.3212°S 153.0318°E)
- C. Slaughter Park, Phillips Street and Ranes Court (27.3270°S 153.0358°E)
- Denning Road Park (no.30) (27.3288°S 153.0172°E)
- Embrook Parkland, Telegraph Road with walkway access from Embrook Heights estate adjoining the Bracken Ridge Plaza shopping centre (27.3309°S 153.0293°E)
- Eucalypt Place Park (27.3241°S 153.0165°E)
- Ewan Place Park (27.3267°S 153.0283°E)
- Fabian Place Park (27.3269°S 153.0451°E)
- Ferguson Park, on the corner of Barrett and Bracken Streets (27.3180°S 153.0369°E)
- Fred Francis Park, accessible from Bracken Ridge Road, Bracken Street, St John Fisher Drive and from Sungate Estate via Greendale and Brookvale Places (27.3155°S 153.0424°E)
- Gawler Crescent Park, on Gawler Crescent south before Gawler meets Whyalla Close (27.3256°S 153.0246°E)
- Harold Dean Park, accessible from Gawain Road, Lynette and Torre Streets (27.3148°S 153.0314°E)
- Harold Kielly Park (27.3109°S 153.0217°E)
- Hoyland Street Park (No. 6) (27.3155°S 153.0170°E)
- Hoyland Street Park (No. 10) (27.3176°S 153.0182°E)
- Isaac Best Park, in David Street (27.3192°S 153.0210°E)
- McPherson Park, accessible from Denham Street, Yaraan Street or Tomah Road (27.3216°S 153.0422°E)
- Mensforth Bushland, on Childs Street(27.3259°S 153.0492°E)
- Michael Place Park, between Michael Place and Barbour Road (27.3251°S 153.0321°E)
- Nicole Street Park (27.3231°S 153.0245°E)
- Oaks Park: Located on Barbour and Denning Roads
- Peter Gaskell Park on Elm Crescent and Maple Close, off Childs Street (27.3255°S 153.0460°E)
- Quinlan Street Park (27.3208°S 153.0492°E)
- Sandgate Third Lagoon Reserve (27.3095°S 153.0445°E)
- Stanley Day Park (27.3214°S 153.0159°E)
- Strowe Place Park (27.3288°S 153.0442°E)
- Talltrees Street Park, on Cardell Place and Talltrees Street, off Quinlan Street (27.3288°S 153.0461°E)
- Telegraph Road Park (27.3284°S 153.0216°E)
- Tinchi Tamba Wetlands Reserve (27.3084°S 153.0283°E)
- Wendy Turnbull Park, accessible from Caruso Place, Corvette Crescent and Embrook Street (27.3300°S 153.0365°E)
- Woodcroft Road Park (27.3192°S 153.0490°E)
- Woodcroft Street Park (27.3192°S 153.0467°E)

== Notable residents ==
- Trent Dalton - author of Boy Swallows Universe
- Bernard Flewell-Smith - soldier and fruit grower
- Emily Seebohm - Olympic swimmer
- Paige Parker - AFLW player
- Sophie Conway - AFLW player
