= Taigum =

- Suburb
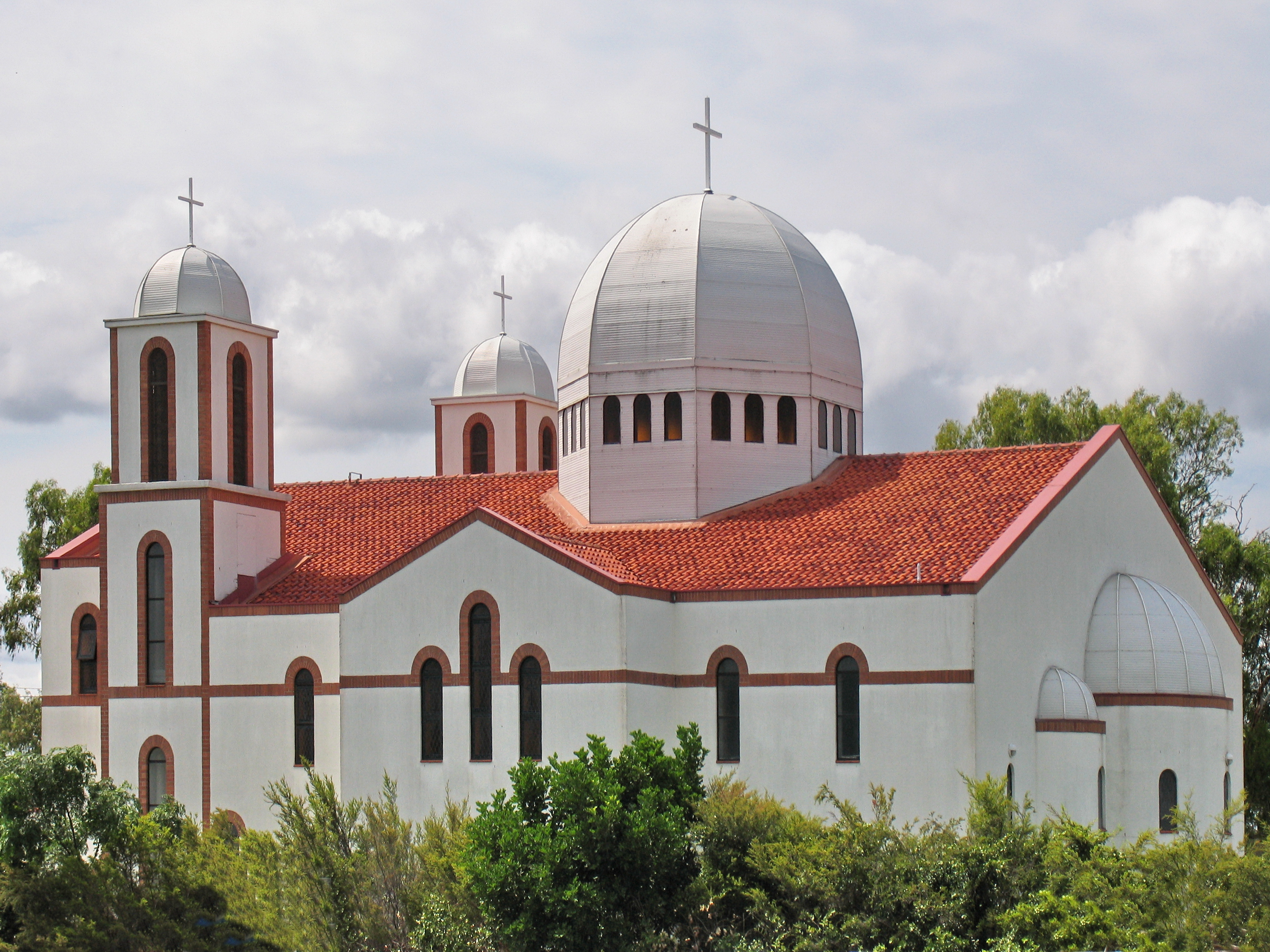
- St Paraskevi Greek Orthodox Church, 2007

- Interactive map of Taigum
- Coordinates: 27.3416°S 153.0461°E
- Country: Australia
- State: Queensland
- City: Brisbane
- LGA: City of Brisbane (Deagon Ward)
- Location: 22.9 km (14.2 mi) N of Brisbane CBD
- Established: 1975

Government
  - State electorate: Sandgate
  - Federal division: Lilley

Area
  - Total: 3.0 km^{2} (1.2 sq mi)

Population
  - Total: 7,801 (2021 census)
  - Density: 2,600/km^{2} (6,730/sq mi)
- Time zone: UTC+10:00 (AEST)
- Postcode: 4018
Suburbs around Taigum
Fitzgibbon	Deagon	Deagon
Fitzgibbon	Taigum	Boondall
Fitzgibbon	Zillmere	Boondall

Taigum is a northern suburb in the City of Brisbane, Queensland, Australia. In the 2021 census, Taigum had a population of 7,801 people.

== Geography ==
The suburb is bounded to the west and north by Cabbage Tree Creek, to the east by Muller Road, and to the south by Beams Road.

== History ==
The Tighgum area (now known as Taigum) was first developed around 1853, as part of a subdivision of the Nundah Division. In 1891, it was suggested, unsuccessfully, by the board that the name be changed to "Tyghum Divisional Board" and Tighgum Creek was also the original and alternate name in brackets for Cabbage tree Creek.

The suburb name was officially recognised on 11 August 1975. The name is derived from an Aboriginal word for lawyer cane. The word Taghum was used as alternative to cabbage in Cabbage Tree Creek.

Zillmere North State School opened on 29 January 1957 on a 12-hectare (30-acre) site. In 1993, it was renamed Taigum State School.

Taigum Square shopping centre opened in 1982 and was expanded in 2001.

St. Paraskevi Greek Orthodox Church at 241 Church Road was founded on 23 April 1986. It was named after Paraskevi of Rome. The cornerstone was laid on 29 November 1987 by Archbishop Stylianos and the church officially opened on 10 December 1995. It serves as home to the Taigum Child Care Centre.

The Centrepoint Church in Taigum opened at 205 Beams Road on 30 May 2021 as a second church location of the Centrepoint Church in Chermside. The building formerly belonged to the iSee Church.

== Demographics ==
In the 2011 census, Taigum had a population of 5,619 people, 53.7% female and 46.3% male. The median age of the Taigum population was 39 years, 2 years above the Australian median. 65.9% of people living in Taigum were born in Australia, compared to the national average of 69.8%. The next most common countries of birth were New Zealand 5.2%, Philippines 3.8%, England 3.7%, India 3.2%, Fiji 1.2%. 78.1% of people spoke only English at home; the next most common languages were 2.1% Tagalog, 1.5% Punjabi, 1.2% Filipino, 1.1% Hindi, 1.1% Italian. Over 38% of households in this area were couples with children, 40% were of couples without children and 18% were single parent households. Over 61% of residential developments were houses and another 25% were townhouses.

In the 2016 census, Taigum had a population of 6,495 people.

== Education ==
Taigum State School is a government primary (Early Childhood-6) school for boys and girls at 266 Handford Road (27.3478°S 153.0402°E). In 2018, the school had an enrolment of 406 students with 35 teachers (30 full-time equivalent) and 28 non-teaching staff (15 full-time equivalent). It includes a special education program.

There are no secondary schools in Taigum. The nearest government secondary schools are Sandgate District State High School in neighbouring Deagon to the north and Aspley State High School in Aspley to the south-west.

== Amenities ==
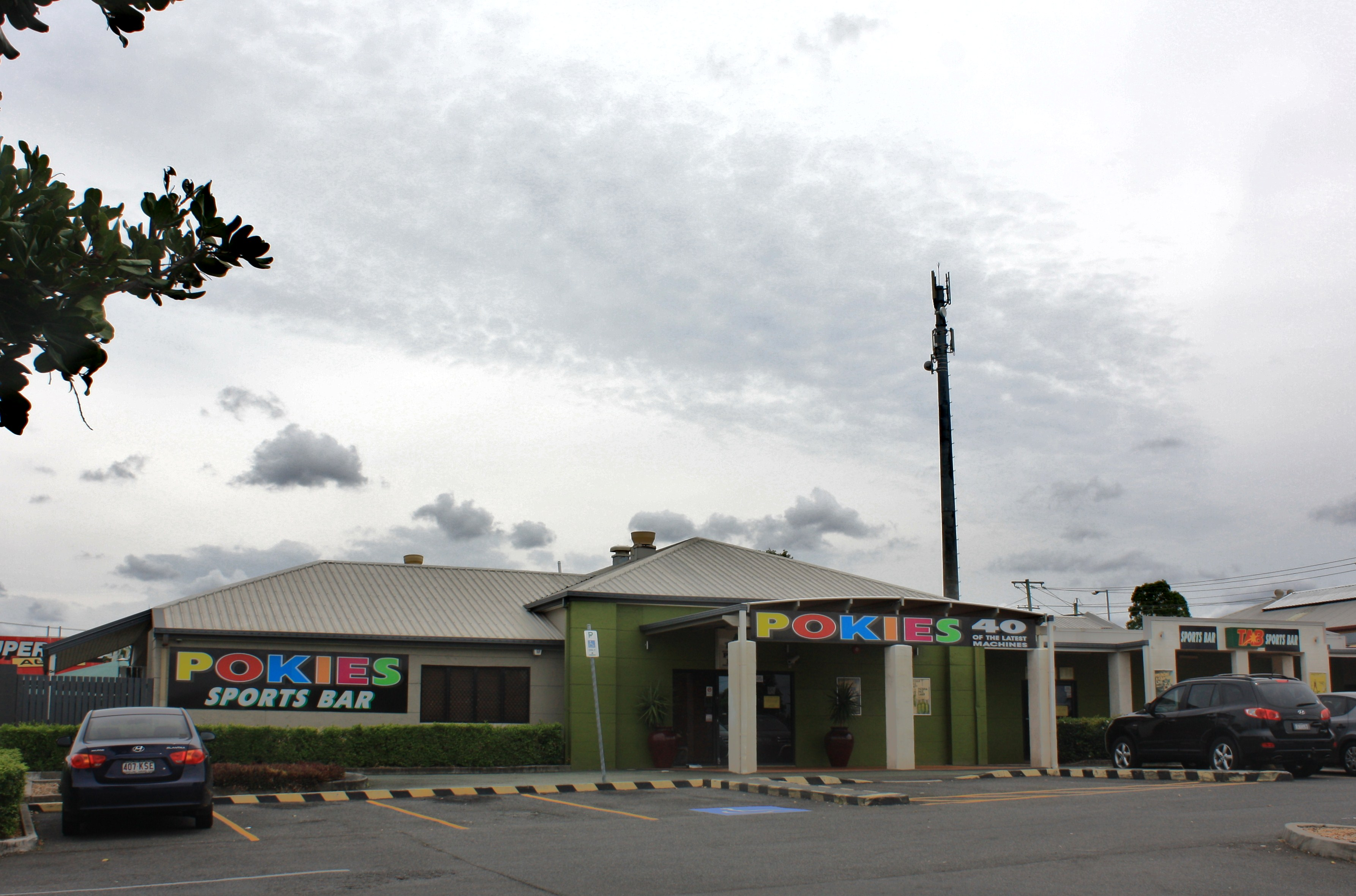
Taigum Tavern, 2021

Taigum Square shopping centre is at 217 Beams Road (27.3510°S 153.0484°E).

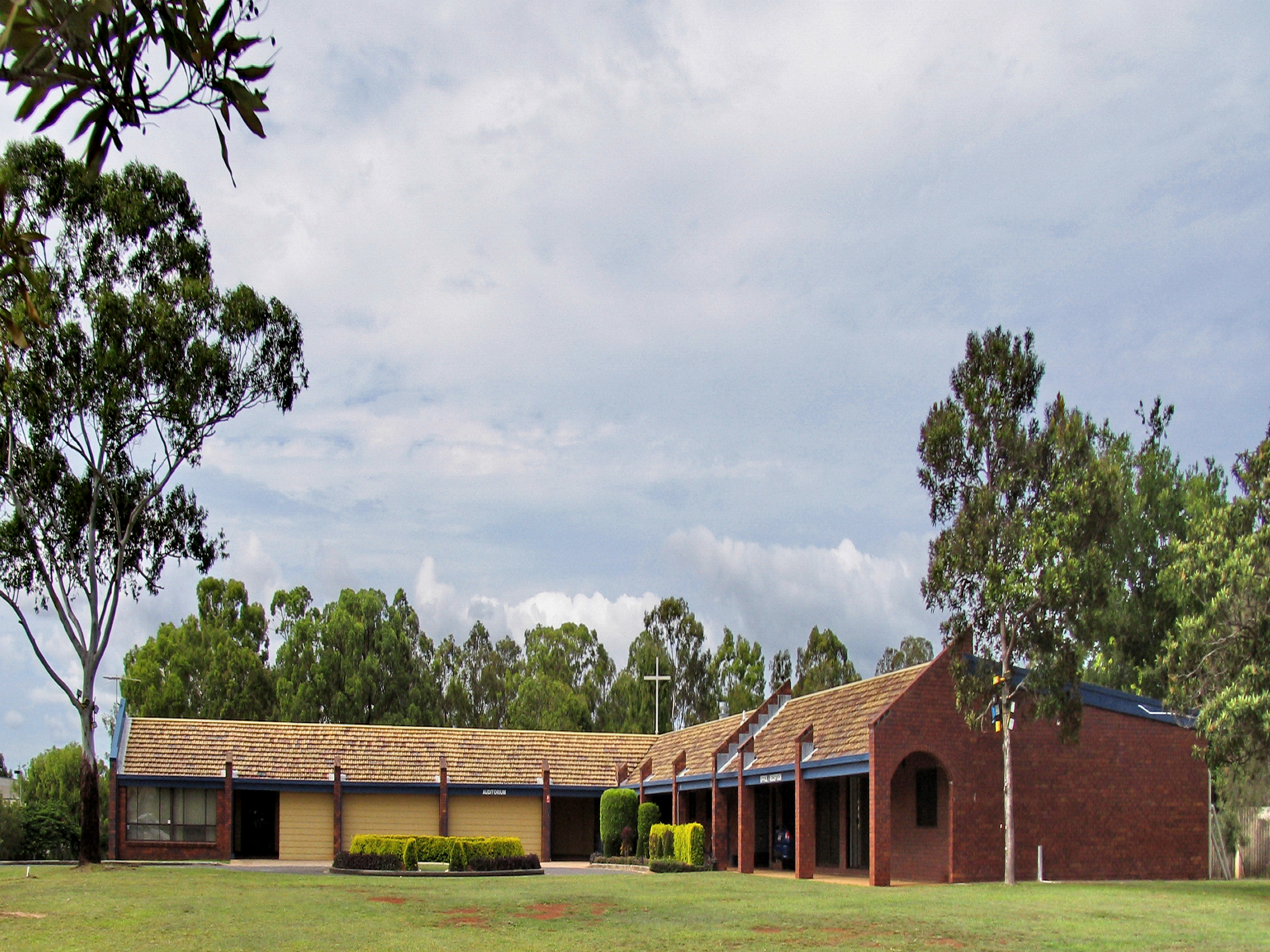
Centrepoint Church, 2007

The Centrepoint Church is at 203 Beams Road (27.3880°S 153.0433°E). It is part of the Australian Christian Churches network.

St Paraskevi Greek Orthodox Church is at 241 Church Road (27.3484°S 153.0473°E). It is a parish of the Greek Orthodox Archdiocese of Australia, part of the Ecumenical Patriarchate of Constantinople.
