= Zillmere =

- Suburb
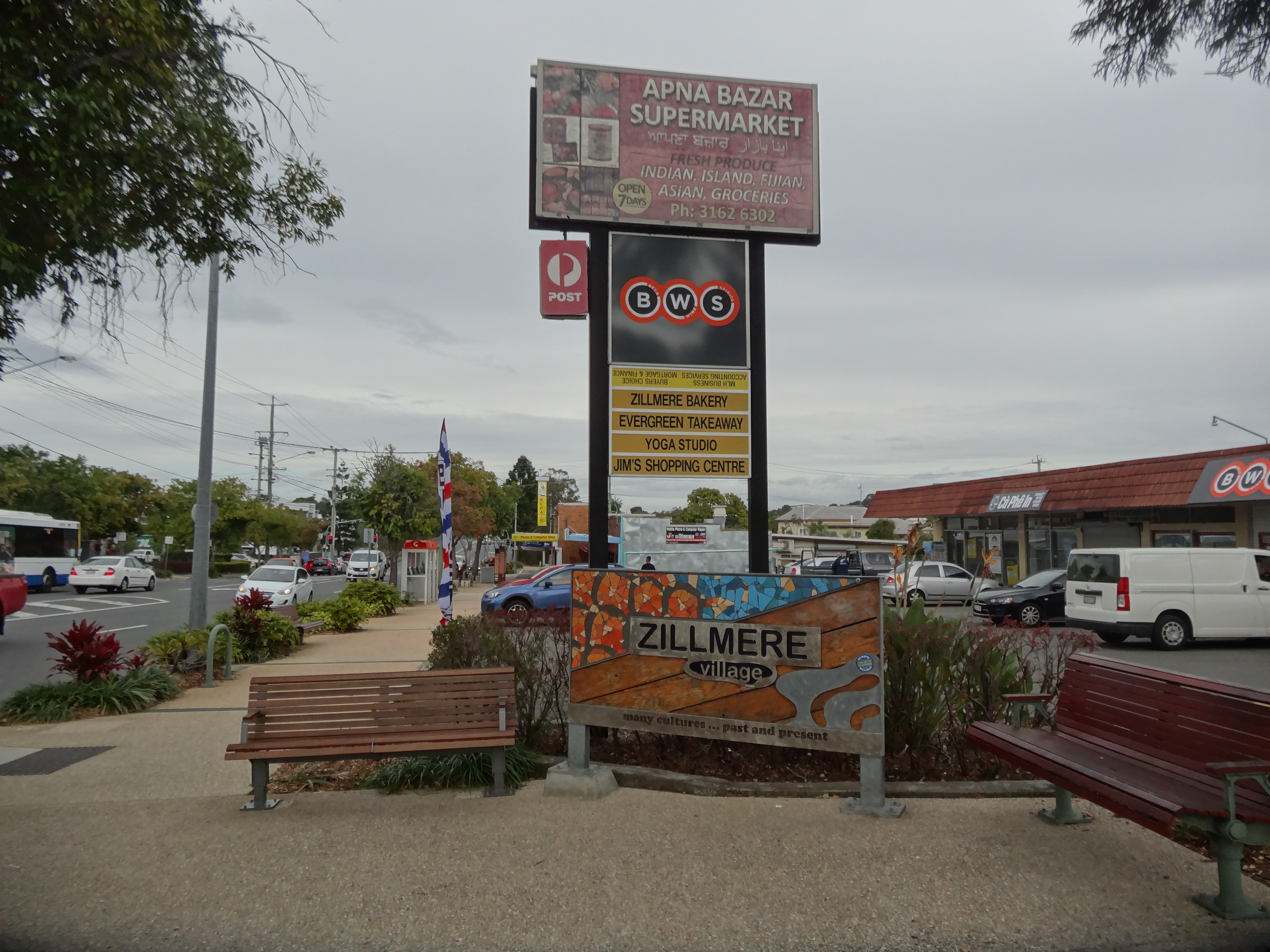
- Zillmere village

- Interactive map of Zillmere
- Coordinates: 27.3553°S 153.0399°E
- Country: Australia
- State: Queensland
- City: Brisbane
- LGA: City of Brisbane (Bracken Ridge Ward; Deagon Ward)
- Location: 13.2 km (8.2 mi) N of Brisbane CBD

Government
  - State electorates: Nudgee; Aspley
  - Federal division: Lilley

Area
  - Total: 3.6 km^{2} (1.4 sq mi)

Population
  - Total: 9,323 (2021 census)
  - Density: 2,590/km^{2} (6,710/sq mi)
- Time zone: UTC+10:00 (AEST)
- Postcode: 4034
Suburbs around Zillmere
Carseldine	Fitzgibbon	Taigum
Aspley	Zillmere	Boondall
Aspley	Geebung	Geebung

Zillmere is a northern suburb in the City of Brisbane, Queensland, Australia. In the 2021 census, Zillmere had a population of 9,323 people.

== Geography ==
As at 2008, Zillmere was approximately 60% residential and 40% industrial.

== History ==
The Turrbal people occupied the region north of Brisbane River, including the area covered by Zillmere.

With European settlement, the area came to be known as Zillman's Waterholes, named after Johann Leopold Zillmann (1813–1892), a Lutheran missionary who served at the mission station nearby at Nundah. In January 1872, the Brisbane Courier described Zillman's Waterholes as being situated between Cabbage Tree Creek and Downfall Creek. It was settled with twenty-seven small farmers residing on the land. At the time there were "two chapels, a brickyard and pottery". The settlers grew pineapples, pigs and other small crops.

St John's Lutheran Church opened at 110 Church Road (27.3547°S 153.0453°E) in 1875. It was built from timber. It was enlarged in 1932. In 1984, the church was sold to the Christadelphians, becoming the Christadelphian Ecclesia Wilston.

Zillman's Waterholes State School opened on 22 January 1877. On 8 March 1888, it was renamed Zillmere State School.

The Zillman's Waterholes congregation of the Church of Christ formed in 1882, worshipping in the Zillmere German Baptist chapel until they opened their own timber chapel in May 1894.

Zillmere Wesleyan Methodist Church was at 35 Handford Road (27.359468°S 153.04°E). It was built in 1894. It was built from timber at a cost of £134 and could seat 110 people. In 1972, it was relocated to the site of the Presbyterian church at 385 Zillmere Road.

After the North Coast Railway Line was extended to Petrie in 1888, the railway station servicing the area was named Zillmere. By the time the first housing estate was marketed in 1897, the area was also being called Zillmere.

St Matthais's Anglican Church was opened in 1895. It was built from timber. In 1964, it was demolished to build a new church. The current St Matthias' Anglican Church was built in 1965. It was built in brick to seat 200 people.

A slaughterhouse and curing works was established in 1898 by J.C. Hutton Pty Ltd to slaughter and process pigs from regional farms.

Zillmere in the 1950s showing State Housing Commission Projects and migrant barracks

In June 1917, 140 building sites and 3 substantial houses of "Show Ground Estate Zillmere" were auctioned by G. H. Blocksidge & Ferguson Auctioneers. A map advertising the auction states the Estate was 3 minutes walk from Zillmere Railway Station.

In May 1920, 90 subdivided allotments of "Pioneer Estate" were advertised to be auctioned by Isles Love & Co. Auctioneers. A map advertising the auction states the estate was close to Zillmere railway station and fronting Sandgate Road.

On Sunday 25 June 1933, Archbishop James Duhig laid the foundation stone for St Dympna's Catholic Church. Duhig returned on Sunday 17 September 1933 to officially open the church. This church is now within the suburb boundaries of Aspley.

During the 1950s, the Housing Commission reclaimed farmland to construct prefabricated houses imported from France. This established Zillmere as a suburban centre. Migrant barracks near Church Road were used to resettle post-war European immigrants until they were destroyed by fire in the mid-1950s.

Zillmere Salvation Army Church opened at 76 Handford Road (27.356552°S 153.0386°E) circa 1955. It was built from timber. The church has closed but the building is still used for community purposes.

Northpine Christian College opened in Zillmere in 1953 as a primary school, but the school building was destroyed in a fire in February 1978, resulting in its relocation to Dakabin.

St Flannan's Catholic School opened within the church building on 29 March 1954. The school was operated by the Holy Spirit Sisters with Sisters Delores, Coreen, Elaine and Lorraine teaching the 132 children (91 girls and 41 boys) who enrolled. St Flannan's Catholic Church and School were officially dedicated by Archbishop James Duhig in November 1954. It was built from timber. For the first four years, the school operated within the church without partitions between the classes, until the first purpose-built school buildings were constructed.

Zillmere North State School opened on 29 January 1957. Circa 1995, it was renamed Taigum State School as it is now within the suburb boundaries of neighbouring Taigum.

Zillmere Presbyterian Church was at 385 Zillmere Road (27.359461°S 153.04°E). It was a timber building built in 1958. It was built from timber. The Zillmere Methodist church was relocated to the site in 1972. Following the amalgamation that created the Uniting Church in Australia in 1977, it became the Zillmere Uniting Church. It is now the Brisbane Congress Congregation At Zillmere, operated by the Uniting Aboriginal and Islander Christian Congress (or simply Congress), an Indigenous division within the Uniting Church established in 1985.

An Assemblies of God Church was established at 52 Murphy Road (27.3630°S 153.03780°E) in 1965. It has closed and is now used for community purposes.

The Zillmere Public Library opened in 1971.

== Demographics ==
In the 2011 census, Zillmere had a population of 8,105 people, 51.2% female and 48.8% male. The median age of the Zillmere population was 34 years, 3 years below the Australian median. 67.1% of people living in Zillmere were born in Australia, compared to the national average of 69.8%; the next most common countries of birth were New Zealand 4.8%, India 3.3%, U.K. 2.8%, Philippines 1.7%, Italy 0.7%. 77.5% of people spoke only English at home; the next most common languages were 1.4% Punjabi, 1.1% Samoan, 0.9% Tagalog, 0.8% Karen, 0.8% Cantonese.

In the 2016 census, Zillmere had a population of 8,967 people.

In the 2021 census, Zillmere had a population of 9,323 people.

== Heritage listings ==
There are a number of heritage-listed sites in the suburb, including:

- former St John's Lutheran Church (also known as Christadelphian Church Hall), 110 Church Road
- Zimitat Cottage, 5 Gillies Street
- Zillmere State School A Block (also known as Zillman's Waterholes School), 70 Murphy Road
- Karalee, 27 Weston Street
- Weston Residence, 39 Weston Street
- Albury Farmhouse, 255 Zillmere Road
- former Zillmere Methodist Church, 383 Zillmere Road
- Cliftonvilla (also known as The Price House), 395 Zillmere Road
- Hutton's Factory Workers Cottage, 444 Zillmere Road
- Hutton's Factory Workers Cottage, 446 Zillmere Road
- Joseph Lee's Farmhouse, 470 Zillmere Road

== Etymology ==
The word Zillmere can be broken into two parts Zill and mere. The first part of the conjugation is the first part of Zillmann meaning Sail maker in old German dialects. Spelling variations of this family name include: Zyll, Zyl, Zeil, Ziel, Zyller, Zyllmann, Zillmann, Zylhoffer. The word mere is recorded in Old English, corresponding to Old Saxon meri, Old Low Franconian *meri (Dutch meer), Old High German mari / meri (German Meer), Goth. mari-, marei, Old Norse marr (Swedish mar-, French mare). They derive from reconstituted Germanic *mari, itself from Indo-European *mori, the same root as marsh and moor. The Indo-European root gave also birth to similar words in the other European languages : Latin mare 'sea' (Italian mar", French mer), Old Celtic *mori 'sea' (Gaulish mori-, more, Irish muir, Welsh môr, Breton mor), Old Slavic morje. Therefore, Zillmere is the conjugation for Zillman's Waterholes, which were in turn named after early German pioneer Leopold Zillman.

== Education ==
Zillmere State School is a government primary (Prep-6) school for boys and girls at Murphy Road (27.3646°S 153.0373°E). In 2018, the school had an enrolment of 135 students with 13 teachers (9 full-time equivalent) and 9 non-teaching staff (6 full-time equivalent).

St Flannan's School is a Catholic primary (Prep-6) school for boys and girls at 420 Beams Road (27.3502°S 153.0383°E). In 2018, the school had an enrolment of 363 students with 27 teachers (23 full-time equivalent) and 22 non-teaching staff (13 full-time equivalent).

There are no secondary schools in Zillmere. The nearest government secondary school is Aspley State High School in neighbouring Aspley to the west.

== Amenities ==
Zillmere has a busy local shopping centre on the east side of the railway line adjacent to the railway station. The centre includes a Superpharm IGA, newsagent, 7-Eleven, Domino's Pizza, pharmacy, medical centre, bakery, tailor, key cutting shop and veterinary surgery.

The Brisbane City Council Library service operate the Zillmere Public Library. The library is located on the corner of Jennings Street and Zillmere Road.

=== Churches ===
St Flannan's Catholic Church is a Roman Catholic church at 194 Hanford Road (27.35049°S 153.039°E).

St Matthias' Anglican Church is at 74 Murphy Road (27.365088°S 153.0372°E).

Brisbane Congress Congregation is at 385 Zillmere Road (27.359461°S 153.04°E). It is part of the Uniting Aboriginal and Islander Christian Congress (or simply Congress), an Indigenous division within the Uniting Church of Australia.

Zillmere Church of Christ is at 367 Zillmere Road (27.35984°S 153.041°E).

Christadelphian Ecclesia Wilston is at 110 Church Road (27.3547°S 153.0453°E).

Despite the name, Virginia Tongan Church meets at 367 Zillmere Road in Zillmere (27.3596°S 153.0411°E). It is part of the Wesleyan Methodist Church.

Other churches located in Zillmere are:

- Assemblies of God.
- Christ Ministries International Church CMIC.

== Sport ==
Zillmere includes North Star Football Club, who play in the Brisbane Premier League in 2012 and Zillmere Eagles Australian Football Club and Geebung Bowls Club.

Zillmere is also home to a local Parkrun which is run every Saturday morning at the North Star Football club grounds.
