= Sandgate District State High School =

Secondary school in Brisbane, Australia

Coordinates: 27°19′47.30″S 153°03′19.53″E

Location
- 41 Braun Street, Deagon; Brisbane, Queensland; Australia

Information
- Type: High school
- Motto: Industria Floremus
- Established: 1959
- School district: Deagon
- Principal: Andy Stergou
- Grades: 7–12
- Enrollment: 1200+
- Colours: Maroon, white, and gold baez
- Mascot: Ibis
- Website: https://sandgatedistrictshs.eq.edu.au/

Sandgate District State High School (SDSHS) is an independent public, (Note: One of 250 independent public schools in Queensland.) co-educational secondary school located in the Brisbane suburb of Deagon, Queensland Australia. It is administered by the Queensland Department of Education and, as of 2024, has an enrolment of 989 students, with 91 teaching staff and 45 non-teaching staff. The school caters to students from Year 7 to Year 12 and was established in 1959.

== History ==
It opened on 27 January 1959 but the first classes – five, A1, A2, B1, C1 and C2 were conducted in the Sandgate Town Hall, on the floor and on the stage, because the first school building (F block) was not yet ready for occupation.

Foundation students designed the school badge. Every part of the design has meaning. The motto Industria Floremus translates to "hard work brings success", or more literally "through industry we flourish". Latin was taught as a language in the early years of the school.

The shield and the boomerang (on which the motto is printed) indicate the association of early Sandgate with the Aboriginal Australian people who roamed the area and featured in its early development.

The ibis, a common local bird, has also been associated with Sandgate since its early development. Early in the 21st century, local business people created from the letters of its name the rubric "I believe in Sandgate", a phrase often used in references to the school.

== Notable alumni ==
- Courtney Act (also known as Shane Jenek) – Australian Idol contestant and entertainer
- Jayson Bukuya – NRL player for the Cronulla-Sutherland Sharks and Fiji
- Susan Kiefel – former Chief Justice of the High Court of Australia

== See also ==
- Education in Queensland
- List of schools in Greater Brisbane
