= Adelaide College of Divinity =

Theological college in South Australia

Coordinates: 34.931001°S 138.548599°E

- Type: Theological college
- Active: 1979–2022
- Location: Adelaide, South Australia, Australia
- Campus: Brooklyn Park, South Australia
- Website: Adelaide College of Divinity

Adelaide College of Divinity (ACD) was an accredited higher education provider offering diploma, associate and bachelor's degrees, graduate diplomas, master and doctoral degrees in ministry, it also was a Registered Training Organisation offering certificates and a diploma.

The ACD offered qualifications in its own right in the vocational and higher education sectors and, except for the period 2011–2013, its teaching staff have formed the Department of Theology at Flinders University in the Faculties of Education, Humanities and Law.

The ACD brought together the Adelaide Theological Library, from the collections of the three colleges which had merged for form ACD. The library has grown since the merger and in 2006 held over 60,000 volumes, including many dating back before 1850 and some to the 17th century.

Within the college grounds was a labyrinth designed by Adelaide stained glass artist Cedar Prest to honour the journeys of refugees and migrants. Symbols incorporated in the labyrinth include a large chalice and a central wafer – a reference to Holy Communion. A stylised version of the labyrinth was used as the college logo.

== History ==
The ACD started as an ecumenical consortium of the theological colleges of the Anglican (St Barnabas College), Baptist (Burleigh College), Roman Catholic (the St Francis Xavier Seminary, now the Catholic Theological College) and Uniting (Parkin-Wesley College, from December 2008 known as Uniting College for Leadership and Theology) Churches in 1979, with the Bible College of South Australia in 1980, in Adelaide, South Australia.

In late September 1997, the then three constituent colleges in Adelaide moved to a campus at Brooklyn Park, South Australia which had been vacated by the Salesian College. Teaching began on 7 October and the ACD campus was officially opened on Sunday, 9 November by the Governor of South Australia, Sir Eric Neal.

Nungalinya College was associated with the ACD at one time. Nungalinya College is ecumenical with a focus on theological education and training for ministry for Aboriginal and Torres Strait Islander people. It is located in Darwin, Northern Territory.

In 2003, the Uniting Church moved its distance education focused Coolamon College from Brisbane to Adelaide where it joined the ACD In Brisbane it had been a member of the Brisbane College of Theology and also offered Sydney College of Divinity courses.

In 2009 the Anglican Diocese of Adelaide's synod voted in favour of withdrawing St Barnabas' College from the ACD and affiliating with the Charles Sturt University School of Theology via St Mark's National Theological Centre in Canberra. In 2010, the Catholic theological college withdrew from the consortium to become part of the new Adelaide Theological Centre.

The Uniting Church in Australia's Trinity College Queensland, previously a member of the Brisbane College of Theology, initially offered Australian Catholic University qualifications, before joining the ACD. This arrangement ceased at the end of 2019, when Trinity joined the Australian College of Theology.

The Uniting College for Leadership and Theology, the last remaining collegiate of the Adelaide College of Divinity, joined the University of Divinity at the beginning of 2023. This resulted in the formal closure of the Adelaide College of Divinity.
