= Rolland Busch =

Australian minister (1920–1985)

- Born: 26 October 1920; Windsor, Queensland
- Died: 19 July 1985 (aged 64); Sydney, New South Wales
- Occupations: Presbyterian and UCA minister
- Spouse: Evelyn Mavis Smith
- Children: 2
- Religion: Presbyterian, Uniting
- Ordained: 16 February 1954
- Offices held: President of the Assembly of the Uniting Church in Australia

Rolland Busch, AO, OBE (26 October 1920 – 19 July 1985), also known as Rollie Busch, was an Australian theologian and Presbyterian and Uniting Church minister. He was the foundation principal of the Trinity Theological College in Brisbane from when it was formed in 1977 until 1985. He was president of the Assembly of the Uniting Church in Australia from 1982 to 1985. He was appointed Officer of the Order of the British Empire (OBE) in the 1978 Queens Birthday Honours and appointed Officer of the Order of Australia (AO) in 1984.

== Early life ==
Busch was born in an inner suburb of Brisbane, Queensland, on 26 October 1920. His father (Arthur Emil Busch) was a German migrant pork butcher, his mother Harriet (Nee Beck) had been born in Queensland. Busch grew up in Toowoomba, and got a job as a telegram boy at age 15 to help support the family during the Great Depression. His immediate family remained in Toowoomba for the rest of their lives.

== Military service ==
Busch enlisted in the Militia in 1938 and the Second Australian Imperial Force in 1942 having been promoted to sergeant. He took part in the Battle of Milne Bay and was commissioned as a Lieutenant on 2 July 1943. He served in a signals platoon, headquarters, and movement control in New Guinea Force and was promoted to Captain before returning to Australia in March 1945 as a railway transport officer, transferring to the Reserve of Officers on 1 May 1946.

Busch was also a chaplain in the Citizen Military Forces from 1954 until he was placed on the retired list in 1981, having reached Chaplain-General in 1968 with the Australian Defence Force ranking as major general.

== Study and academia ==
Busch lectured Philosophy at University of Queensland whilst also studying as an external student at Melbourne College of Divinity then at the Presbyterian Theological Hall within Emmanuel College at UQ. He was ordained on 16 February 1954. He also spent a year studying at Union Theological Seminary, New York in 1958. Busch was professor of New Testament studies in the Presbyterian Theological Hall from 1961 and in the Congregational, Methodist and Presbyterian Joint Faculty of Theology from 1968. He was also principal of Emmanuel College from 1962 to 1978. He convened the Queensland Presbyterian department of Christian education from 1960 to 1963 and the board of local mission from 1970 to 1974.

His qualifications included:

University of Queensland
BA, 1951
MA, 1954
BD, 1955
Melbourne College of Divinity
BD, 1953
Columbia University
MD, 1958

== Ministry ==
When he was ordained, Busch was inducted into pastoral charge of St Giles's church at Yeerongpilly in Brisbane. He was state moderator of the Presbyterian church in 1972-3 and after union of the Queensland Synod of the Uniting Church 1977–1979. He was President of the National Assembly of the Uniting Church for a three-year term from 1982. He served as chairman of the Brisbane College of Theology in 1985.

== Awards, honours and titles ==
- Professor of Theological Studies at University of Queensland in 1961
- Chaplain-General of the Australian Army in 1968
- Officer of the Order of the British Empire (OBE) in 1978
- National Medal
- Officer of the Order of Australia (AO) in 1984.
- Branch Chaplain to the Order of St John of Jerusalem
- Branch Chaplain to the Order of Saint Lazarus.
- President of the Assembly of the Uniting Church in Australia from 1982 to 1985.

== Aboriginal Rights ==
Busch was a firm believer in Aboriginal Rights and in the right of self-determination for many Aboriginal settlements. His criticism was voiced against the Queensland government's denial of self-determination to the Aboriginal inhabitants of Aumkun and Mornington Island , pitting him against Sir Joh Bjelke-Petersen on several occasions. The Uniting Church has continued their support of Aboriginal Rights in Australia.

== Family ==
On 14 August 1948 at St John's Church of England, Penshurst, Sydney, he married Evelyn Mavis Smith, a nurse whom he had met in New Guinea during the war. They had two children (Rhonda and Ian). Both Ian and Rhonda's Husband (Ray) have served on the boards of the UCA Queensland Synod and Wesley Hospital continuing his legacy. His grandchildren continue his plight through the different organisations the work in.

== Biography ==
Noel W. Wallis (2001). A Man Called Rollie.

Religious titles
Preceded by Winston O'Reilly	President of the Assembly, Uniting Church in Australia; 1982–1985	Succeeded by Ian B. Tanner
