= Sunshine railway station (disambiguation) =

Sunshine railway station may refer to:

- Sunshine railway station, Brisbane
- Sunshine railway station, Melbourne
