= Irvine Scott =

Irvine John Scott was an Anglican priest in the second half of the twentieth century.

Scott was educated at the Australian College of Theology and ordained in 1965. After curacies at Indooroopilly, Queensland and Bundaberg. He was Rector of Murray Bridge from 1970 to 1975; and Archdeacon of The Murray from 1974 to 1979. In 1980 he became the Incumbent at Ipswich.
