= Geebung, Queensland =

Suburb of Brisbane, Australia

Geebung
- Suburb
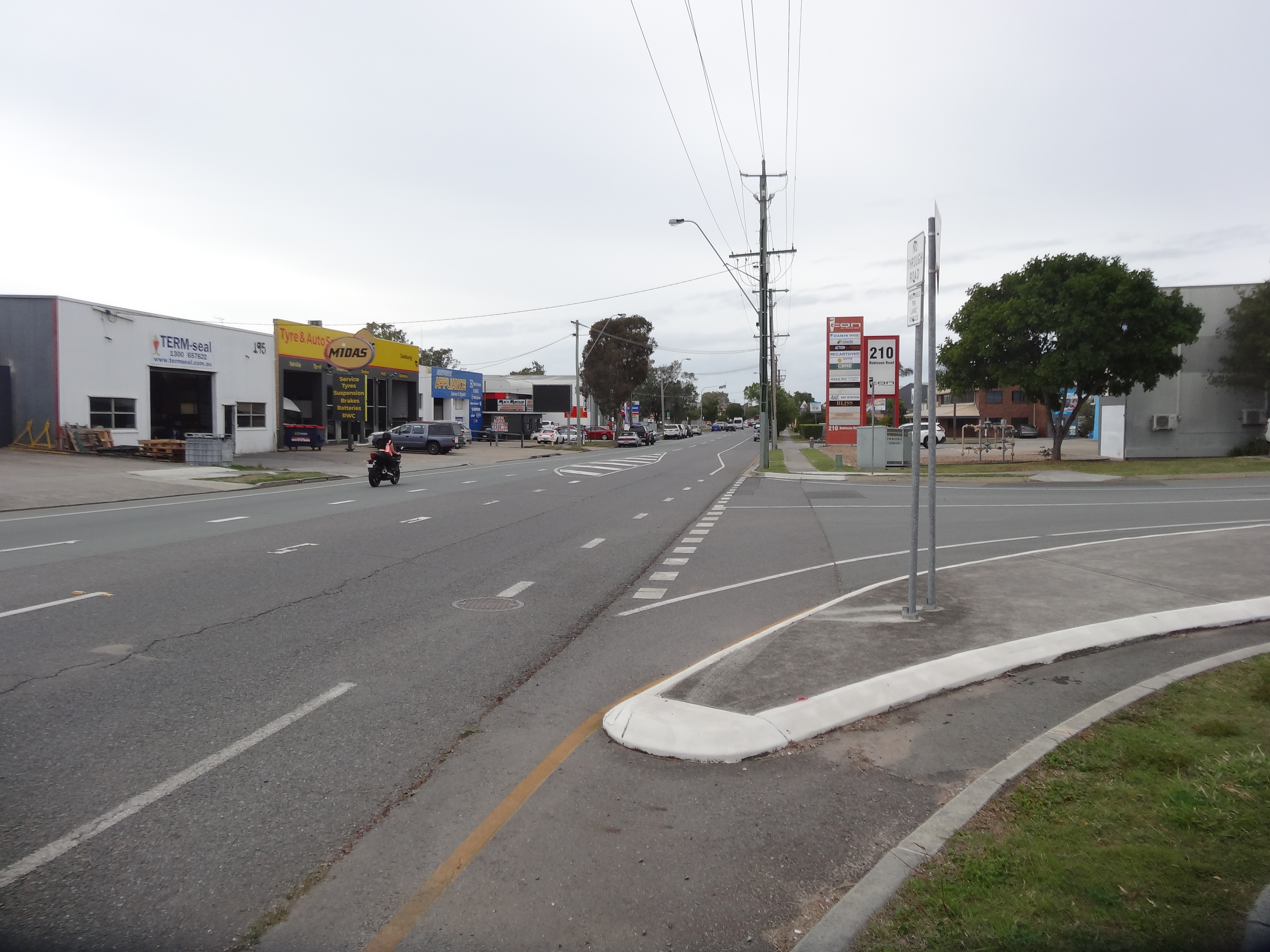
- Robinson Road East industrial area, 2023

- Interactive map of Geebung
- Coordinates: 27.3705°S 153.0483°E
- Country: Australia
- State: Queensland
- City: Brisbane
- LGA: City of Brisbane (Deagon Ward; Marchant Ward)
- Location: 11.7 km (7.3 mi) NNE of Brisbane CBD

Government
  - State electorate: Nudgee Stafford Aspley
  - Federal division: Lilley

Area
  - Total: 3.8 km^{2} (1.5 sq mi)

Population
  - Total: 4,850 (2021 census)
  - Density: 1,276/km^{2} (3,310/sq mi)
- Time zone: UTC+10:00 (AEST)
- Postcode: 4034
Suburbs around Geebung
Zillmere	Boondall	Boondall
Aspley	Geebung	Virginia
Chermside	Wavell Heights	Virginia

Geebung is a northern suburb in the City of Brisbane, Queensland, Australia. In the 2021 census, Geebung had a population of 4,850 people.

== Geography ==
The suburb is centred on its railway station on the Caboolture railway line.

== History ==
The suburb takes its name from its railway station, which in turn was named after the fruit of the plant Persoonia media, known as "jibung" in the Dharuk language.

The Geebung Baptist church was initiated with a stump capping ceremony on Saturday 7 February 1925, prior to this services had been held in the war memorial hall. On Saturday 14 February 1925, the church was opened in a ceremony attended by 150 people. It was made of weatherboard and could seat about 100 people. The church (including fencing, the organ, the seating etc.) cost £543/12/0 having spent £80 for the land. A new church was built in 1969. In May 2012 the Geebung Baptist congregation merged with the Sandgate Baptist congregation, selling their existing churches and establishing a new church, Connect Baptist Church at Deagon. In August 2013, the Geebung Baptist church was purchased by the Tonga Houʻeiki Church for $1.5 million, although the decision to purchase was controversial within the Tongan congregation.

During World War II, the southern piece of Geebung was host to the Chermside Army Camp, which occupied land that includes part of the present day Marchant Park. Two years after the war, ISAS (Industrial Sales and Service) assembled war surplus Nissen huts for their business on Robinson Road in north Geebung. In 1949, the Brisbane City Council zoned that territory for general industry.

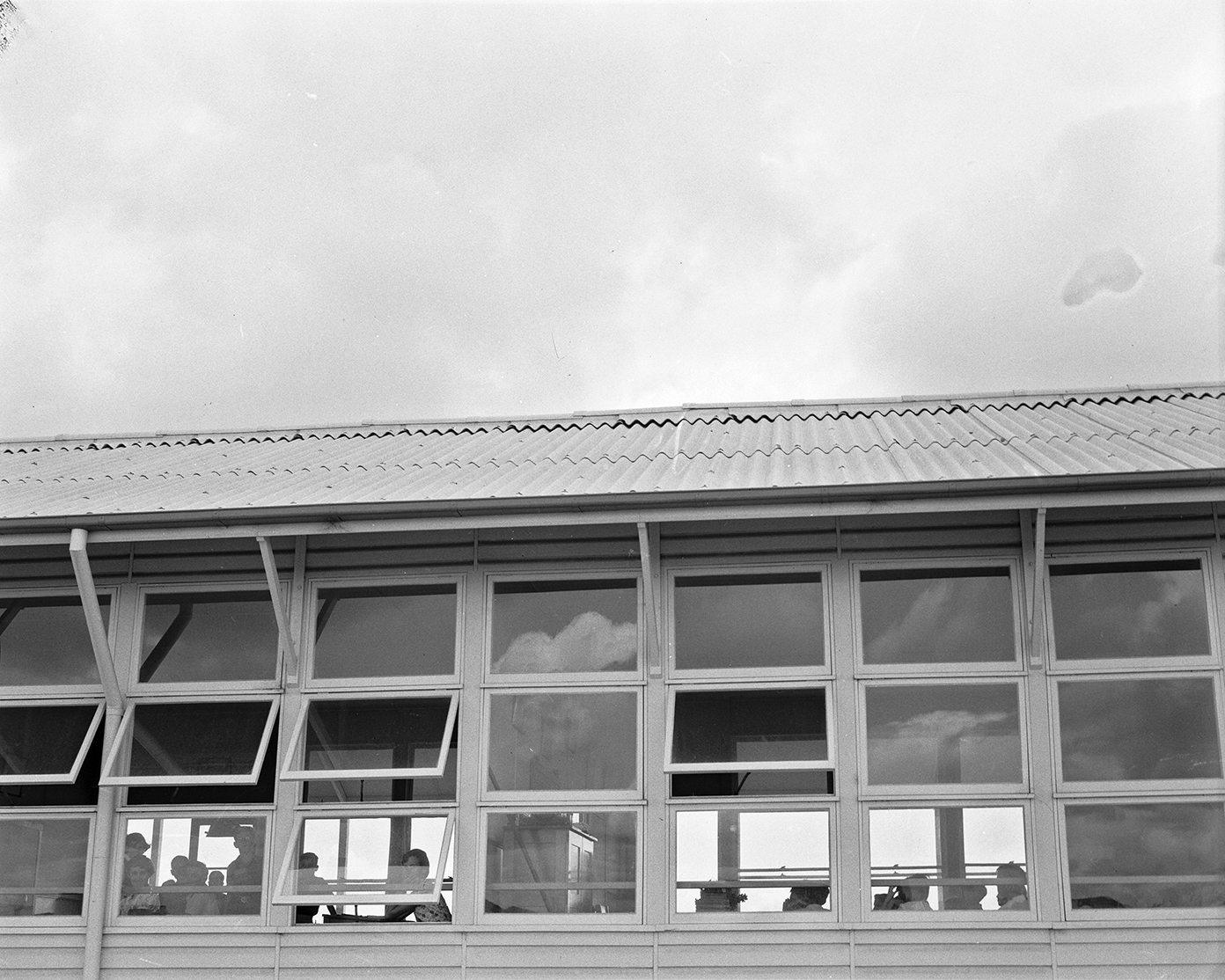
Geebung State School

Geebung State School opened on 27 January 1953.

Geebung Methodist Church opened in 1955 at 38 Railway Parade (corner of Bayview Terrace, 27.3687°S 153.0463°E). In 1977, it became part of the Uniting Church in Australia, following the amalgamation of many Methodist, Presbyterian and Congregational Churches. A new Geebung Uniting Church was opened in Simla Avenue on 1 October 1983 by the Moderator of the Queensland Uniting Church, Lewis Born. The 1955 church building is still extant and, as at 2021, is occupied by the Endeavour Foundation which provides disability support services.

St Kevin's Catholic Church opened at 251 Newman Road opened on 6 May 1962.

On Saturday 28 September 1963, Archbishop Philip Strong laid the foundation stone for St Mary the Virgin Anglican Church at 44-46 Innes Street (27.3710°S 153.0467°E). The church was officially opened and dedicated on 16 November 1963 by Archbishop Strong and consecrated on 24 March 1974 by Archbishop Felix Arnott. Its closure on 23 July 2000 was approved by Assistant Bishop Appleby. As at September 2020, it is used as a residence.

St Kevin's Catholic Primary School opened in January 1964.

The R H Kirkley Education Centre opened on 21 May 1979 was opened as a school for students requiring significant educational support due to intellectual and other disabilities. It was later renamed R H. Kirkley Special School and then Geebung Special School on 1 January 1986.

In 2013, there was a significant fossil discovery. The fossils were the remains of a rare 50-million-year-old crocodile-like species and several other animals.

Geebung railway station underwent a significant upgrade in 2014, with the construction of a new road bridge replacing the previous level crossing.

== Demographics ==
In the 2011 census, the population of Geebung was 4,620: 51.1% female and 48.9% male. The median age of the Geebung population was 37 years, the same as the national median. 77.5% of people living in Geebung were born in Australia, compared to the national average of 69.8%; the next most common countries of birth were New Zealand 4.5%, England 2.6%, India 1.4%, Philippines 1.1%, China 0.6%. 86.9% of people spoke only English at home; the next most popular languages were 0.9% Italian, 0.9% Mandarin, 0.8% Punjabi, 0.8% Hindi, 0.5% Samoan.

In the 2016 census, Geebung had a population of 4,626 people.

In the 2021 census, Geebung had a population of 4,850 people.

== Heritage listings ==
Heritage-listed sites in Geebung include:

- Geebung State School, 250 Newman Road (27.3747°S 153.0457°E)
- Gerns Factory Residence, 39 Buhot Street East (27.378881°S 153.049426°E)

== Education ==
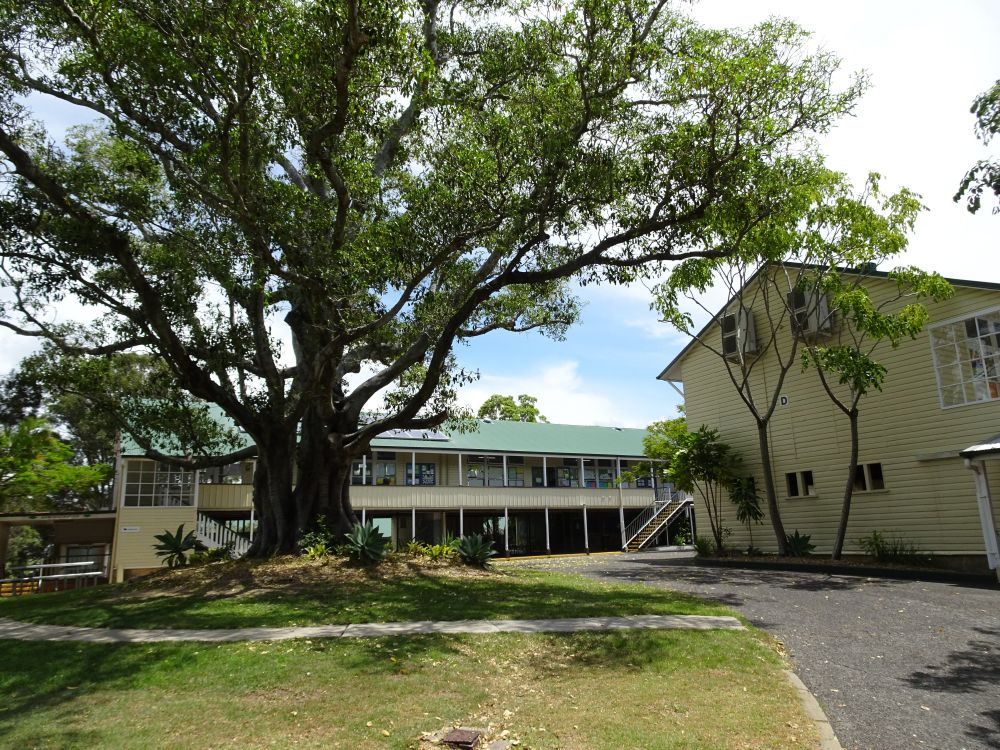
Geebung State School grounds, 2018

Geebung State School is a government primary (Prep–6) school for boys and girls at 250 Newman Road (27.3751°S 153.0466°E). In 2017, the school had an enrolment of 318 students with 24 teachers (19 full-time equivalent) and 18 non-teaching staff (11 full-time equivalent). It includes a special education program.

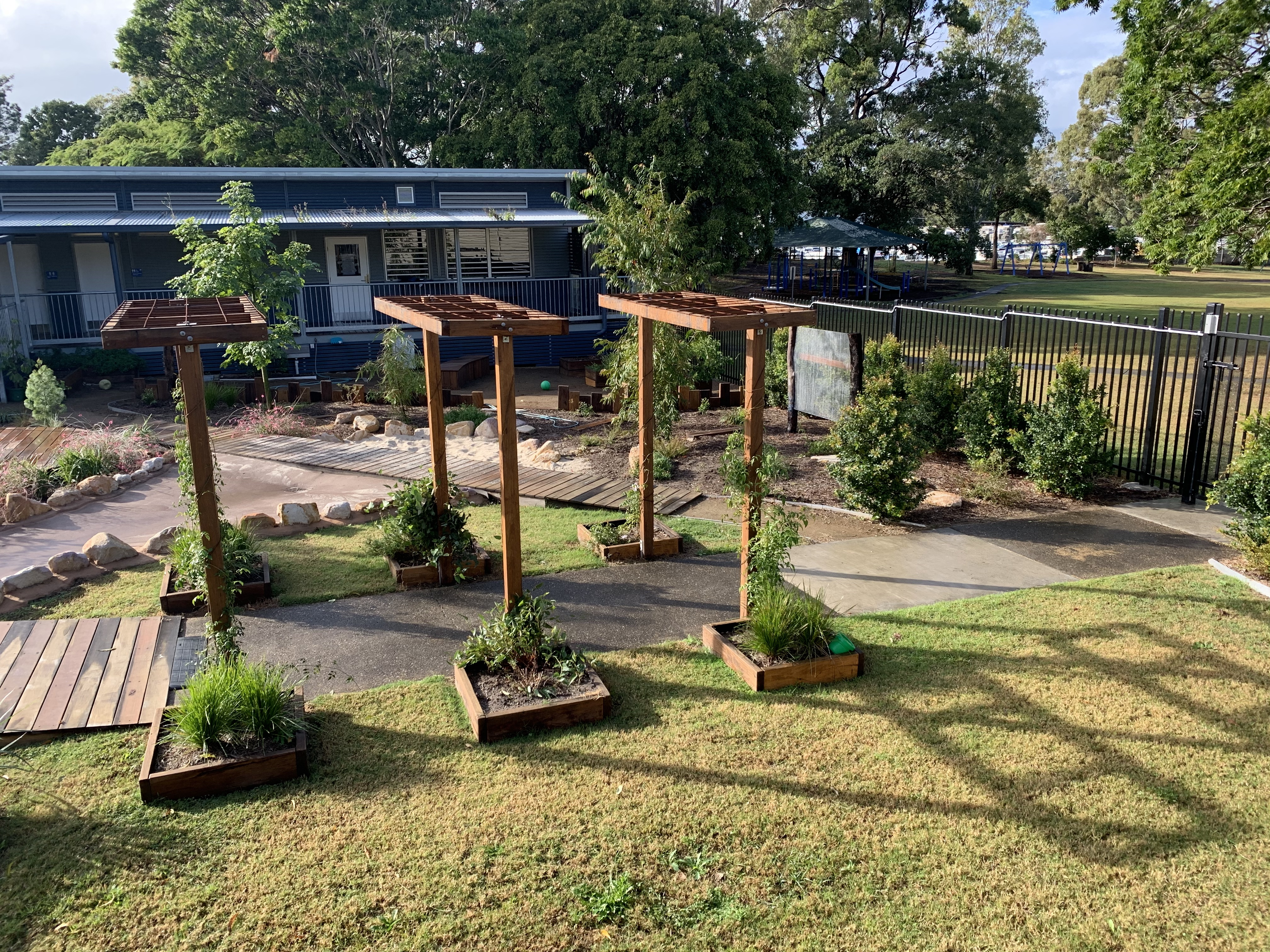
Outdoor classroom, Geebung Special School, 2025

Geebung Special School is a special primary (Early Childhood to Year 6) school for boys and girls at Beau Vista Street (27.3785°S 153.0509°E). In 2017, the school had an enrolment of 100 students with 34 teachers (28 full-time equivalent) and 45 non-teaching staff (26 full-time equivalent).

St Kevin's School is a Catholic primary (Prep–6) school for boys and girls at 249 Newman Road (27.3738°S 153.0471°E). In 2017, the school had an enrolment of 271 students with 23 teachers (17 full-time equivalent) and 16 non-teaching staff (9 full-time equivalent).

There is no secondary school in Geebung. The nearest government secondary schools are Aspley State High School in neighbouring Aspley to the north-west, Craigslea State High School in Chermside West to the south-west and Wavell State High School in neighbouring Wavell Heights to the south.

== Amenities ==
=== Churches ===
St Kevin's Catholic Church is at 251 Newman Road (corner of Deborah Street, 27.3739°S 153.0480°E).

Geebung Uniting Church is at 59–61 Simla Avenue (corner of Mayflower Street, 27.3727°S 153.0426°E).

Wavell Heights Wesleyan Methodist church holds its services at the Geebung Uniting Church. It is part of the Wesleyan Methodist Church.

Tonga Houʻeiki Church is at 27 Innes Street (27.3703°S 153.0464°E).

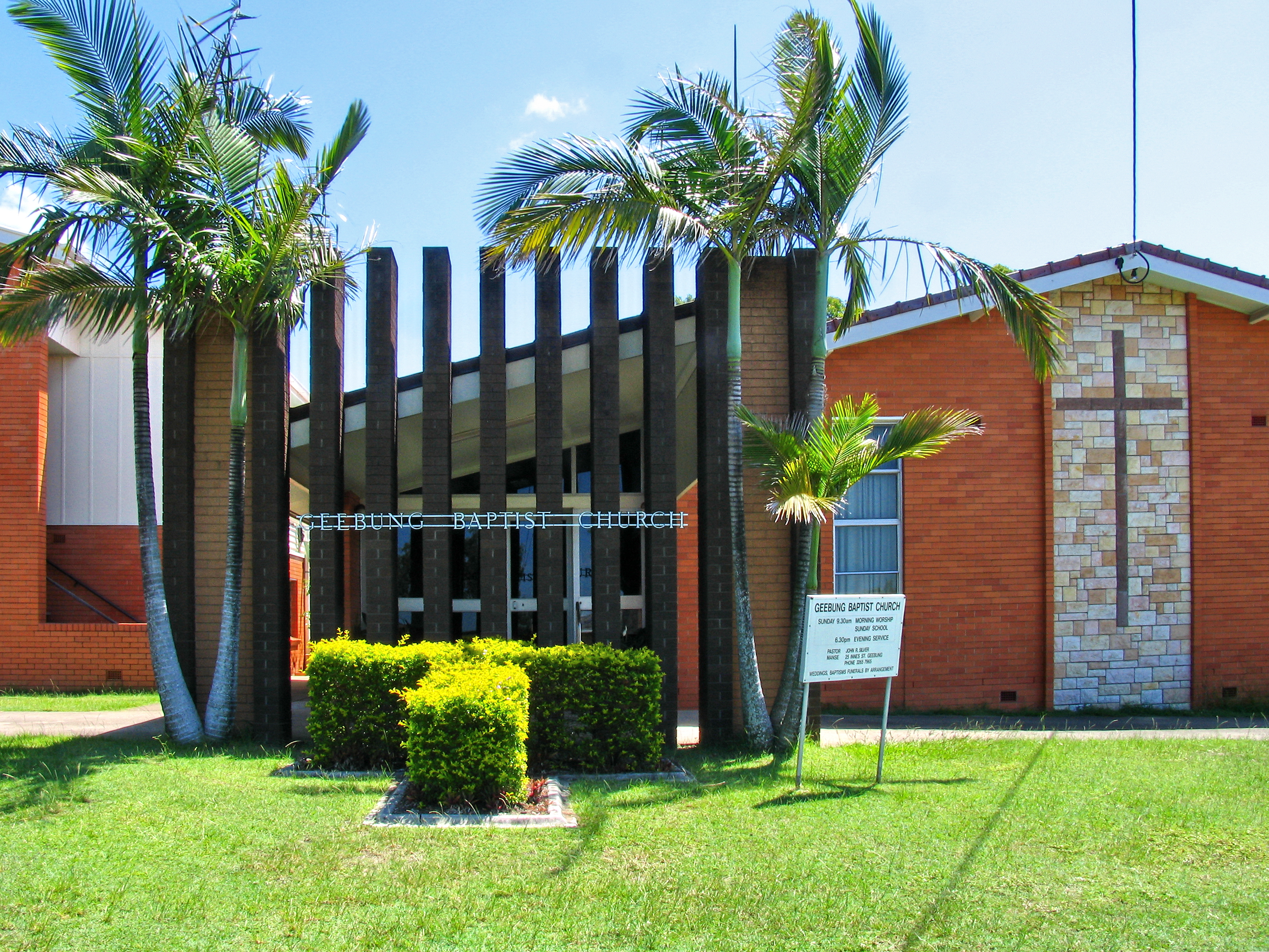
Geebung Baptist Church (now the Tonga Houʻeiki Church), 2007

=== Parks ===
There are a number of parks, including:

- 7th Brigade Park (27.3800°S 153.0386°E)
- Bowden Park (27.3736°S 153.0502°E)
- Copperfield Street Park (27.3710°S 153.0439°E)
- Downfall Creek Reserve (27.3825°S 153.0574°E)
- Geebung Park (27.3689°S 153.0405°E)
- Kingtel Place Park (27.3681°S 153.0512°E)
- Magenta Street Park (27.3804°S 153.0500°E)
- O Callaghan Park (27.3628°S 153.0438°E)
- Rainbow Lorikeet Park (27.3693°S 153.0329°E)
- Thompson Street Park (27.3671°S 153.0429°E)

== Transport ==
Geebung railway station and Sunshine railway station provides access to regular Queensland Rail City network services to Brisbane and Ipswich, as well as Caboolture and the Sunshine Coast.

On the day of the 2011 census, 15.6% of employed people travelled to work on public transport and 62.1% by car (either as driver or as passenger).
