= Drysllwyn =

Drysllwyn may refer to:

- Drysllwyn, Brisbane, a heritage-listed house in Queensland, Australia
- Dryslwyn Castle in Wales
