= Daniel Willis =

Australian clergyman (b.1954)

Daniel Willis (born 8 April 1954, in Herberton) is an Australian clergyman, having spent most of his adult life in the Anglican Diocese of Sydney. In 2012 Willis formed Leading Global Impact, an organisation dedicated to leadership development amongst top leaders who are thinking nationally or internationally. He was appointed CEO of Bible Society NSW (October 2001) and lead the organisation through significant change until July 2010. He was also appointed to the position of International Deputy Director for the South Pacific Region (Oceania) of the Lausanne Movement in 2004. Since moving to Sydney Sydney in 1972 he has had an extensive career both in business and ministry.

== Early education and early years ==
Willis, who already held a Bachelor of Business, studied theology at Moore Theological College, graduating in 1987 with a Bachelor of Theology from the Australian College of Theology and the college's own Diploma of Arts in Ministry. He also holds a Master of Education in Religious Education from the University of South Australia.

In his earlier life Willis worked for Arnott's Biscuits exporting product throughout the Asia Pacific and the Middle East. On leaving Arnott's he studied Information Technology and worked for Blue Metal Industries, now owned by Boral and before entering Moore College spent 2 years at United Data Centre.

== Ministry years ==
Willis was ordained a Deacon in Sydney's St Andrew's Cathedral by Archbishop Donald Robinson in 1988 and in December of the same year ordained a Priest in Wollongong's St Michael's Cathedral Church by Bishop Harry Goodhew, who later became Archbishop of Sydney. He served in parish churches of St Phillip's Caringbah , St Albans Frenchs Forest and the Cathedral Church of St Andrew . In 2001, Willis moved from pastoral ministry to become the chief executive officer of Bible Society NSW. Under his leadership the Society saw significant change including moving from its city building to its present location at Macquarie Park and converting from a statutory body under a 1927 Act of the New South Wales Parliament to a company limited by guarantee under the Corporations Act (2001) in October 2008. The Board of Bible Society Western Australia enlisted his help from February 2005 to 2007 to assist them with the management and reshaping of their organisation. In 2009, the Jesus. All About Life Project, developed in 2004 and run in Adelaide 2005, Canberra 2006, and in Tasmania 2007, ran across NSW and Western Australia. The project brought together 15 denominations and some 1700 churches to work together in utilizing various forms of media to engage people in a discussion about the relevance of Jesus Christ to everyday life. Willis was a significant driving force in leading the seven independent Bible Societies across Australia to form a single, national company. Members of each Society voted unanimously for the formation of a single corporation in September 2009 . In 2010 Willis led the South Pacific delegation to Lausanne's Third Congress on World Evangelization in Cape Town, South Africa . His involvement with the Lausanne Movement continues to keep his passion for world evangelization at the forefront of his thinking. He has travelled and taught in over 50 countries to mentor and develop top emerging young leaders.

In 2017 Willis was asked to organise GAFCON III to be convened in Jerusalem in 2018. The global conference brought together just under 2,000 faithful Anglicans from over 70 countries and was described as the largest representative gathering of Anglicans to have ever been held. In 2020 he was asked to take on the role of Global Operations Manager, supporting the General Secretary, Archbishop Ben Kwashi in giving leadership to the global movement.

=== Boards and Committees ===
Prior to joining the Bible Society Daniel worked in parish ministry in the Anglican Diocese of Sydney. His last pastoral ministry position was at St Andrew's Cathedral (February 1997 to October 2001) with responsibility for the Cathedral congregation and Cross Talk, a ministry to the city's business community. The Cathedral underwent major restoration work during this time

For the past 38 years he has worked in parish and Bible ministry and is actively involved in mentoring a number of younger leaders across the world. Holding degrees in business, theology and education, Daniel has served as a director with a number of businesses and Christian organisations. He was founding Director and Chairman of the Australian Christian Heritage Foundation, and was on the Advisory Council of the Australian Christian Lobby.
