= Geebung railway station =

Railway station in Queensland, Australia

Geebung
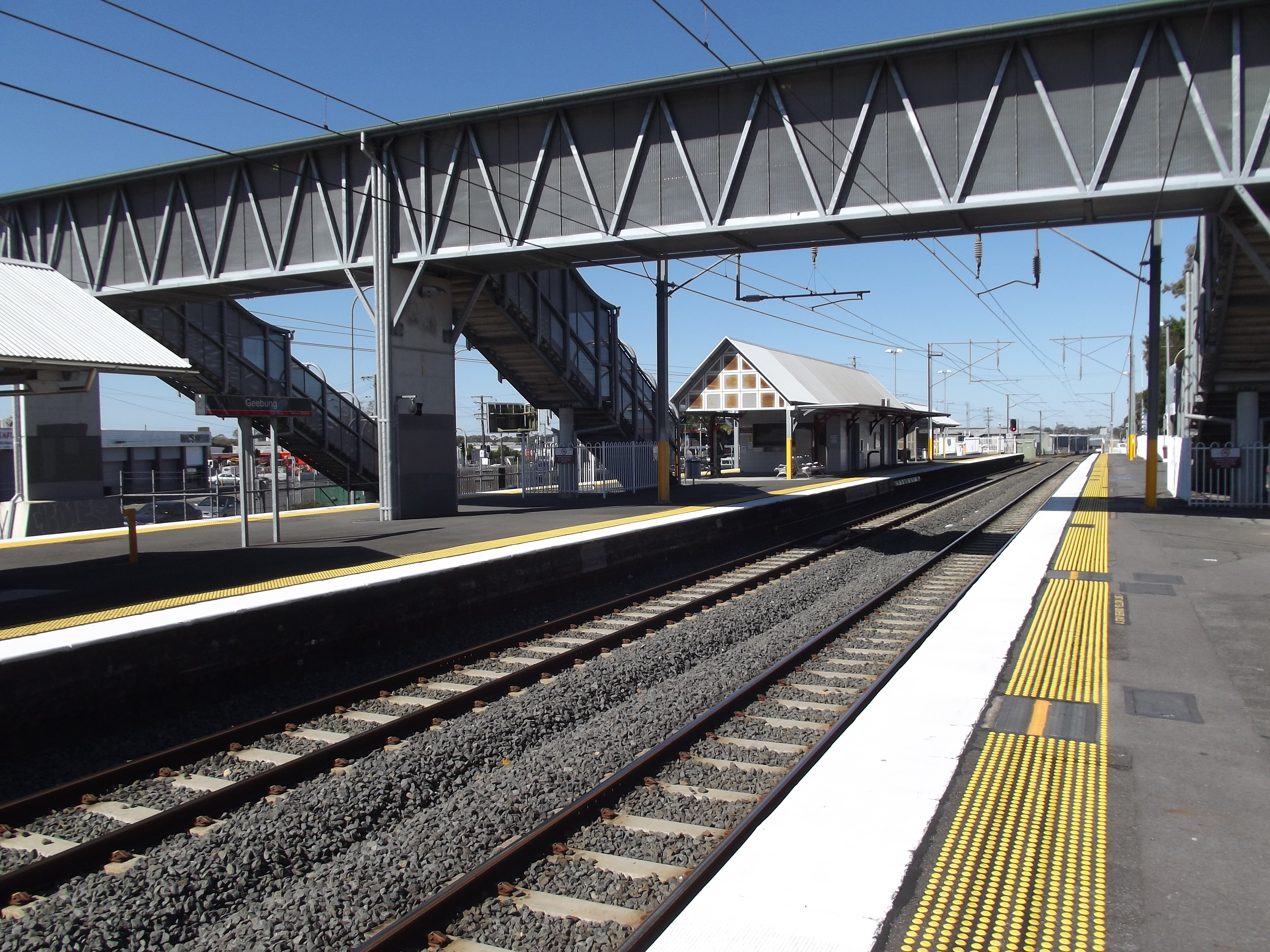
- Northbound view from Platform 1, August 2012

General information
- Location: Railway Parade, Geebung
- Coordinates: 27.3687°S 153.0473°E
- Elevation: 15 m (49 ft)
- Owner: Queensland Rail
- Operator: Queensland Rail
- Line: Redcliffe Peninsula
- Distance: 13.42 kilometres from Central
- Platforms: 3 (1 side, 1 island)

Construction
- Structure type: Ground
- Parking: 35
- Accessible: Yes

Other information
- Status: Staffed part-time
- Station code: 600443 (platform 1); 600444 (platform 2); 600445 (platform 3)
- Fare zone: Zone 2
- Website: Queensland Rail

History
- Opened: 1888; 138 years ago

Services
Preceding station	Queensland Rail	Following station
Sunshine towards Springfield Central via Roma Street	Redcliffe Peninsula line	Zillmere towards Kippa-Ring
Location

Geebung is a railway station operated by Queensland Rail on the Redcliffe Peninsula line. It opened in 1888 serves the Brisbane suburb of Geebung. It is a ground level station, featuring one island platforms with two faces each and one side platform.

== History ==
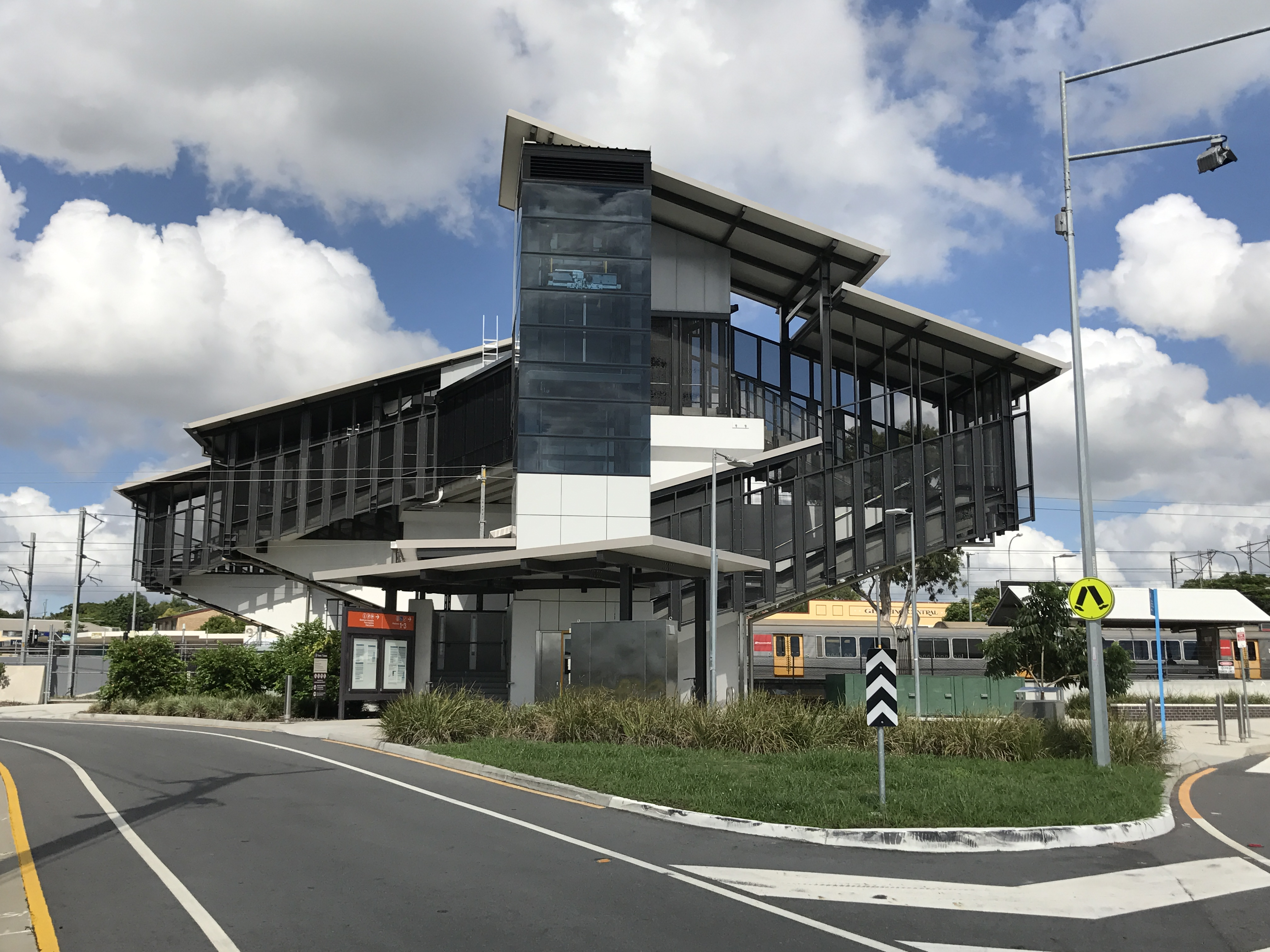
Station concourse overpass and entrance, March 2017

On 28 August 2000, a third platform opened as part of the addition of a third track from Northgate to Bald Hills.

In June 2013, a construction crew of an overpass at the Geebung railway station in northern Brisbane uncovered the 50-million-year-old fossilized remains (vertebrae) of a 5-metre crocodile trapped in a layer of oil shale. Workers drilling holes as part of an overpass reach the crocodile remains, as well as frogs, fish and plant fossils, in the spoil, the oil shale rock and soil found in the excavation pit. The fossil remains were discovered by a work crew drilling a hole for a bridge support over an area called the Zillman Waterholes.

In 2014, the level crossing to the south of the station was replaced by a bridge.

== Services ==
Geebung is served by all Citytrain network services from Kippa-Ring to Central, many continuing to Springfield Central

== Services by platform ==
Geebung platform arrangement
Platform	Line	Destinations	Notes
1	Redcliffe Peninsula	Roma Street & Springfield Central	
1	Redcliffe Peninsula	Ipswich	1 weekday afternoon service only
2	Redcliffe Peninsula	Kippa-Ring	Evening peak only
3	Redcliffe Peninsula	Kippa-Ring	
