= Geebung State School =

Heritage listed school in Queensland

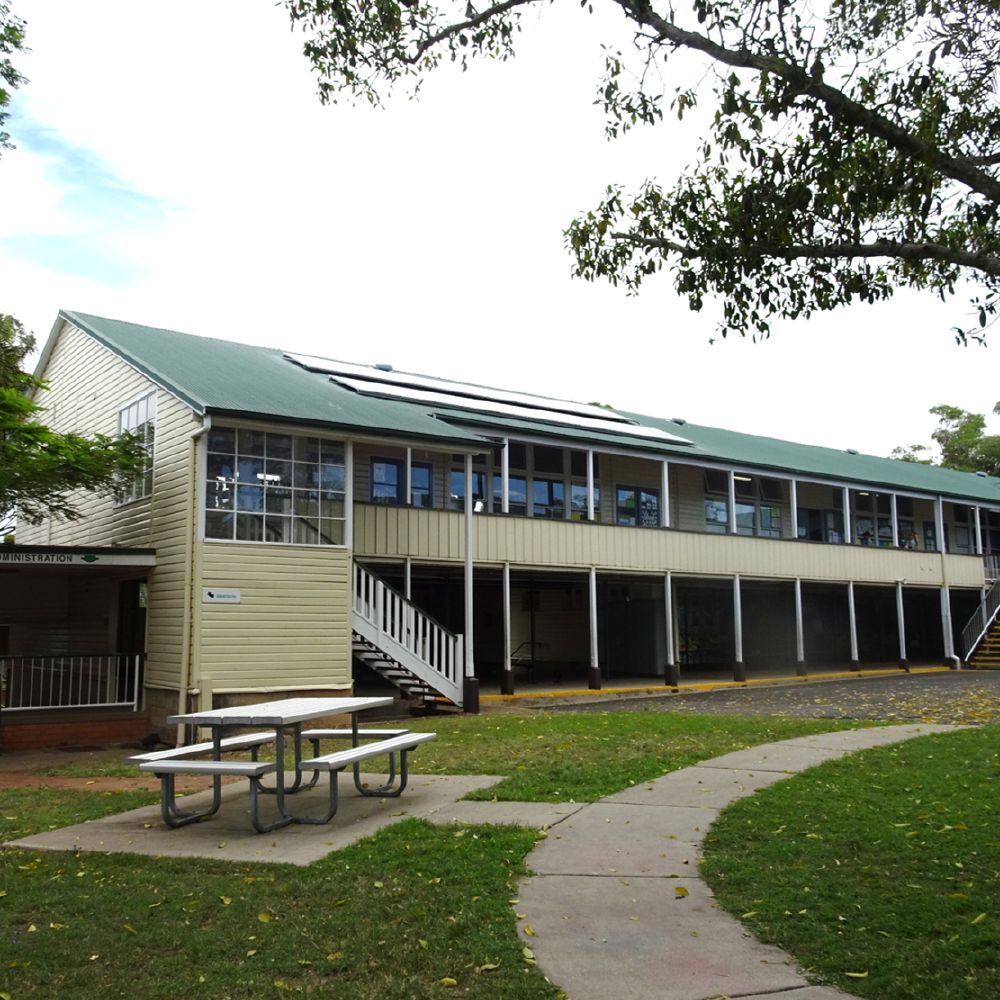
- Geebung State School, Block C, 2018

- Location within Queensland
- 27.3747°S 153.0457°E
- Location: 250 Newman Road, Geebung, City of Brisbane, Queensland, Australia

Queensland Heritage Register
- Official name: Geebung State School
- Type: state heritage
- Designated: 31 May 2019
- Reference no.: 650096
- Type: Dummy: Dummy

Geebung State School is a heritage-listed state school at 250 Newman Road, Geebung, City of Brisbane, Queensland, Australia. It was added to the Queensland Heritage Register on 31 May 2019.

== History ==
Geebung State School, which opened in 1953, is located in the residential suburb of Geebung, approximately 12 kilometres (7.5 mi) north of the Brisbane CBD. The school is important in demonstrating the evolution of state education and its associated architecture. It retains its:

- 1950s site planning
- two Boulton & Paul Buildings (Blocks C, 1953, extended 1954; Block D, 1953, extended 1953), with Department of Public Works (DPW)-designed extensions (Block C, 1956; Block D, 1960)
- a highset timber school building with semi-enclosed stair (Block E, 1956, extended: c. 1957, c. 1958)
- a highset timber administration bridging wing (1956)
- covered walkways (1953, 1956)
- landscaped grounds with mature trees, assembly and play areas, and sporting facilities.

The school has a strong and ongoing association with its surrounding community.

The 10-acre (4.0 ha) school site is located within the traditional lands of the Turrbal people. This site was used for agriculture from 1866 until its resumption for school purposes in 1949. Geebung remained predominately a farming community, growing fruit and vegetables, until after World War II (WWII). Thereafter, residential subdivision flourished in response to population growth resulting from immigration and the post-war baby boom. Industrial development in Geebung, to the north of the North Coast railway line (established in 1888), also occurred after the war. Geebung's population grew rapidly from 807 in 1947 to 7000 in 1954, making a primary school necessary.

Plans for a school were drawn by the DPW in 1951. In the early 1950s, architects developed masterplanning concepts that influenced the design and layout of the whole school. Initially, these plans were broadly based on regular and symmetrical plan forms around a central or prominent axis. Geebung State School's site planning reflected this concept. The buildings were located on the highest point of the school site. They were aligned roughly east–west and parallel to each other, linked by covered walkways, and with play and parade space between them.

At this time, the overriding concern for the Department of Public Instruction was the need to build school buildings as expeditiously and economically as possible. Responding to materials shortages and the pressures of the baby boom, the DPW imported a British building system from manufacturers Boulton & Paul Ltd of Norwich, England. These modular buildings were constructed at many schools across Queensland between 1951 and 1958, including at Geebung State School.

Boulton & Paul buildings were timber-framed and -clad, with a verandah for circulation, and a gable roof. Ideally, they were oriented so the verandah faced north and classrooms faced south, but were also added as extensions to existing buildings regardless of orientation. The building could be high or low-set and had extensive areas of timber-framed awning windows, providing more glazing than had ever been used in Queensland classrooms; almost the entirety of the verandah wall and the opposite classroom wall were glazed. Natural ventilation and lighting was abundant. The classrooms were 24 by 24 feet (7.3 m × 7.3 m), larger than most previous classrooms.

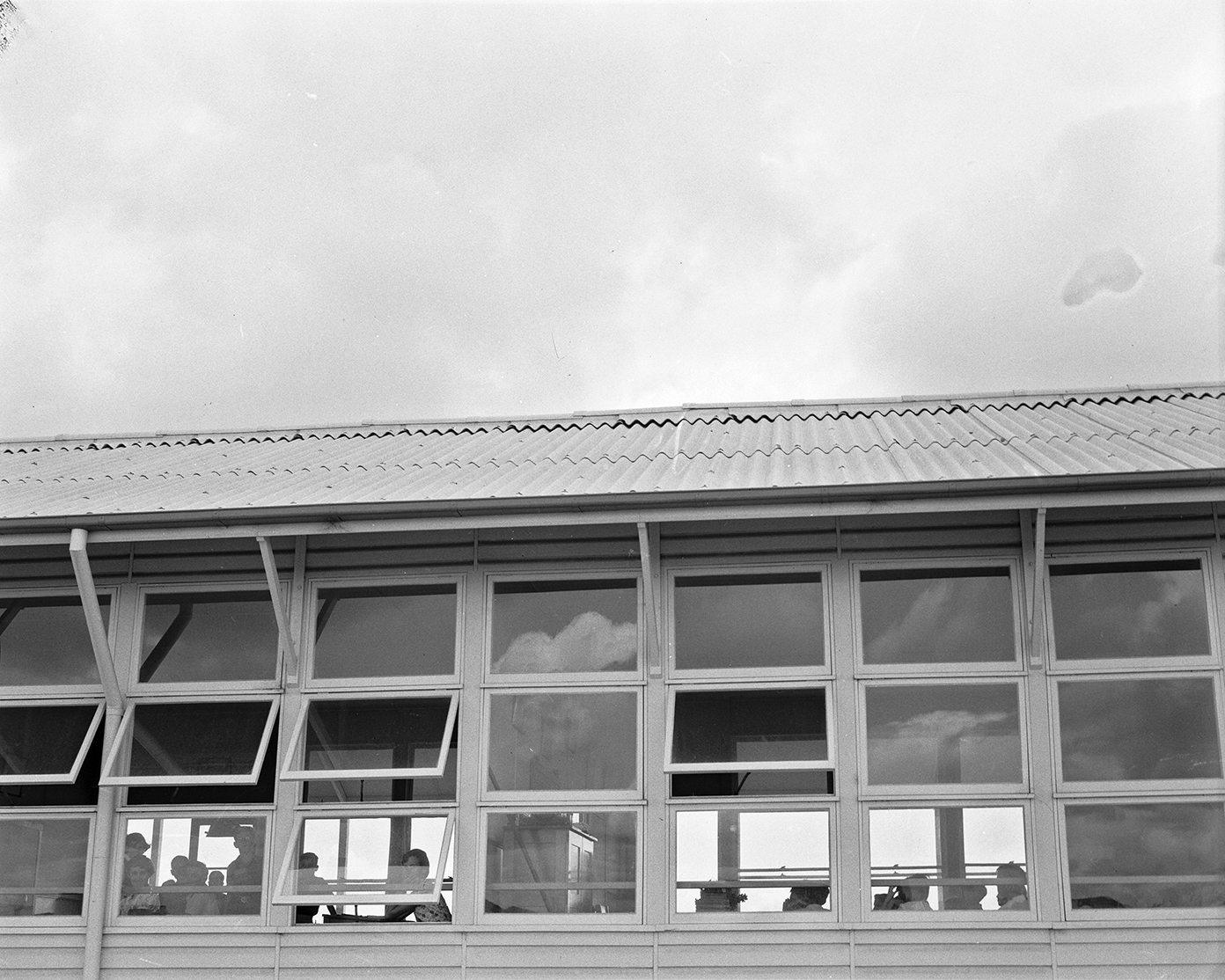
Banks of windows

Geebung State School's first two buildings (Blocks C & D) were of this type. Block C, to the south, was a highset timber Boulton & Paul Building comprising three classrooms of 24 by 24 feet (7.3 m × 7.3 m), plus a teachers' room and a head teachers room. Block C connected to Block D to its north via a highset, covered, timber walkway 52 feet 4 inches (15.95 m) long. Block D comprised: one classroom, 24 by 24 feet (7.3 m × 7.3 m), and a hat room. Both blocks had trussed roofs and were supported on stumps and metal posts, with stairs within the verandah space. Drawings for Block C and D from 1952 indicate that the core of the buildings were to be supported on stumps with antcaps, and stumps are visible in photographs taken during the construction of Block C. It is likely that timber stumps were used for the earliest sections of Block C, then replaced with metal posts. However, for later sections of Block C and all of Block D it appears that metal posts were used from the outset. This is evidenced by outlines in the concrete slab surrounding the metal posts under the first four classrooms of Block C, which suggest a larger supporting member was removed and the metal post inserted, while the concrete finishes flush around the metal posts elsewhere. The southern elevations comprised banks of awning windows. On the north elevation were verandahs with continuous posts, and balustrades of timber rails. Partitions with central doors connected classrooms. Underneath was play space, with timber bracing walls and vertical boarded enclosures to the south elevation.

With its buildings completed in time for the commencement of the 1953 school year on 27 January, the Geebung State School opened with 223 pupils. Construction had cost £12,780. Electricity was not yet connected and the school grounds were unfenced and un-landscaped.

At the official opening of Geebung State School on 29 August 1953, performed by Attorney-General William J Power, accompanied by local member, Herbert F Robinson, MLA for Sandgate, it was announced that a further £1000 would be spent on ground improvements and the addition of two classrooms. These classrooms were added at the eastern end of Block D by November 1953, completing the original building plan.

The school population continued to rise rapidly, necessitating further classroom accommodation. Between 1954 and 1960, the buildings were extended multiple times, in a style consistent with the original Boulton & Paul buildings, forming a cohesive complex. Block C was extended by two Boulton & Paul classrooms to its east by September 1954, in accordance with a plan drawn in November 1953.

Plans were drawn in September 1954 for the addition of a Head Teachers Office, and male and female staffrooms attached to the covered walkway between Blocks C and D; and of a new classroom to the western end of Block C. Conversion of the covered walkway into a Bridging Administration Wing had been planned as early as 4 March 1952, and was a typical location for an administration building in a 1950s site plan. The DPW-designed classroom addition to Block C demonstrated the influence of Boulton & Paul Buildings on subsequent school design. The additions were completed by March 1956. Unlike Boulton & Paul buildings, these were not modular.

In March 1956, plans were drawn for the addition of a third classroom block (Block E) comprising three classrooms, 21 ft (6.4m) wide, and a connecting timber covered walkway to Block D, which was lowset at the south end and highset at the north end, bridging a concrete pathway and retaining wall that ran along the south side of the Block E understorey. Also planned was a Medical Room beneath the north end of the administration bridging wing between Blocks C and D. Block E was supported on concrete stumps, with open space beneath for play. The building had a north-facing verandah with hat and bag racks. However, the eastern-most classroom extended across the building's width to form a classroom 16 by 29 feet (4.9 m × 8.8 m).

This building was constructed to the standard plan for a highset timber school building with semi-enclosed stair, introduced in 1950 by the Department of Public Instruction. This type comprised a long and narrow building with a gable roof. A semi-enclosed stair connected the understorey to a north-facing verandah running the length of the building. The building was a highset timber-framed structure and the understorey was used as covered play space. Classrooms opened off the verandah and had extensive areas of windows; almost the entirety of the verandah wall and the opposite classroom wall were glazed, allowing abundant natural light and ventilation. This type was the most commonly constructed in the 1950s in Queensland. The building at Geebung State School cost £12,233.

With the school population still rising, by April 1958 Block E had been extended by three classrooms 24 by 21 feet (7.3 m × 6.4 m) to its west, at a cost of £7127. Block E was extended again, by two classrooms to the west, in the financial year to 30 June 1959, with the end classroom supported on timber trusses. Block D was also extended, by one DPW-designed classroom to its west, in 1960, which unlike the earlier Boulton & Paul sections had crimped metal-clad bag rack balustrades to the upper verandah. A new classroom was created beneath this western one, to a plan approved in July 1961.

By May 1962, a further wing to the south was planned. It was drawn parallel to Block C, to which it connected by a covered walkway to its north. This wing (Block B) was on-site by 7 July 1964, but its alignment with Block C formed a V-shaped courtyard, which reflected mid-1950s master planning rather than the school's early 1950s site plan.

Alterations were made at the western end of Block D after June 1967 to create new classrooms on the first and understorey levels and new stairs on the northwest corner. A further addition, comprising one classroom to the first and understorey levels, was made to the western end of Block D in 1967.

An important component of Queensland state schools was their grounds. The early and continuing commitment to play-based education, particularly in primary school, resulted in the provision of outdoor play space and sporting facilities, such as playing fields and tennis courts. Also, trees and gardens were planted to shade and beautify schools. Mature trees, including two Fig trees (Ficus spp.) and four Mango trees (Mangifera indica), were retained on the largely bare Geebung State School site. By July 1955, a large playing field was formed to the west of the school buildings. Tennis courts and a swimming pool with change rooms and seating (east of the tennis courts) were on site by 1968. By April 1976, the school grounds also included an adventure playground (northwest corner), and basketball courts (south of the playing field).

Other additions to the site have been made. These include: amenities blocks (west of Block C, by July 1964); a dental clinic (south of Block B, c. 1978); a pre-school (on the corner of Newman and Ellison Roads, by March 1985); and an activities centre (west of Block B, by June 1980). An Assembly Hall was added, on the previous site of the amenities blocks, by November 2011.

Alterations to the significant buildings have occurred over the life of the school. Plans for additions to the western extent of the administration bridging wing were made in April 1978 and the structure is evident by May 1981. Bag racks were added to the upper verandahs of the Boulton & Paul sections of Blocks C and D sometime between 1960 and 1988. Refurbishment of the administration bridging wing and alterations to two classrooms in Block D, for a staff room and new corridor leading from the administration bridging wing, were made c. 1989.

Throughout the school's existence, it has been the focus and site of community events. Fund-raising through annual school fetes began in its first year, coinciding with the official opening of the school on 29 August 1953. Other fund-raising initiatives included auctions, bottle drives, a Highland Gathering at the school and a "Queen competition" sponsored by the Returned Sailors', Soldiers' and Airmen's Imperial League of Australia (RSSAILA) in 1967. In 2003 Geebung State School's golden jubilee was commemorated with a monument erected near the Newman Road entrance to the school site.

In 2019, Geebung State School continues to operate from its original site and has an enrolment of about 320 pupils. The school retains its 1950s site planning and intact 1950s buildings conforming to standard plans; set in landscaped grounds with assembly and play areas, sporting facilities, mature trees, a new playground installed in 2025, and a gaga ball pit being installed in 2026. Since its establishment, the school has been important to Geebung, as a key focus for the community.

== Description ==
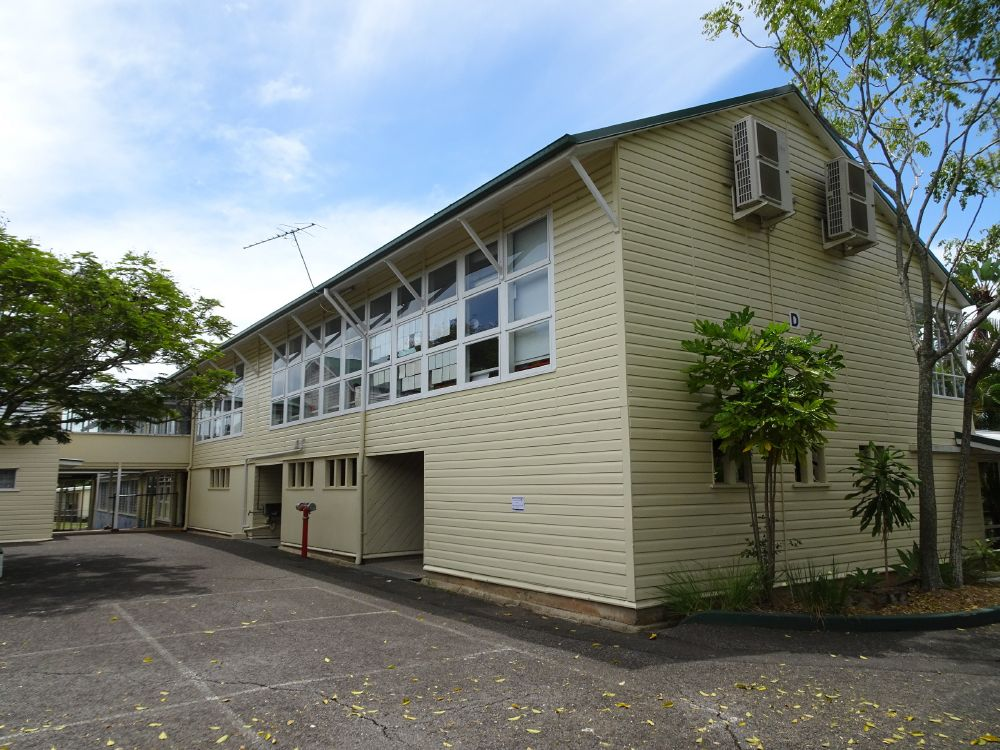
Block D, 2018

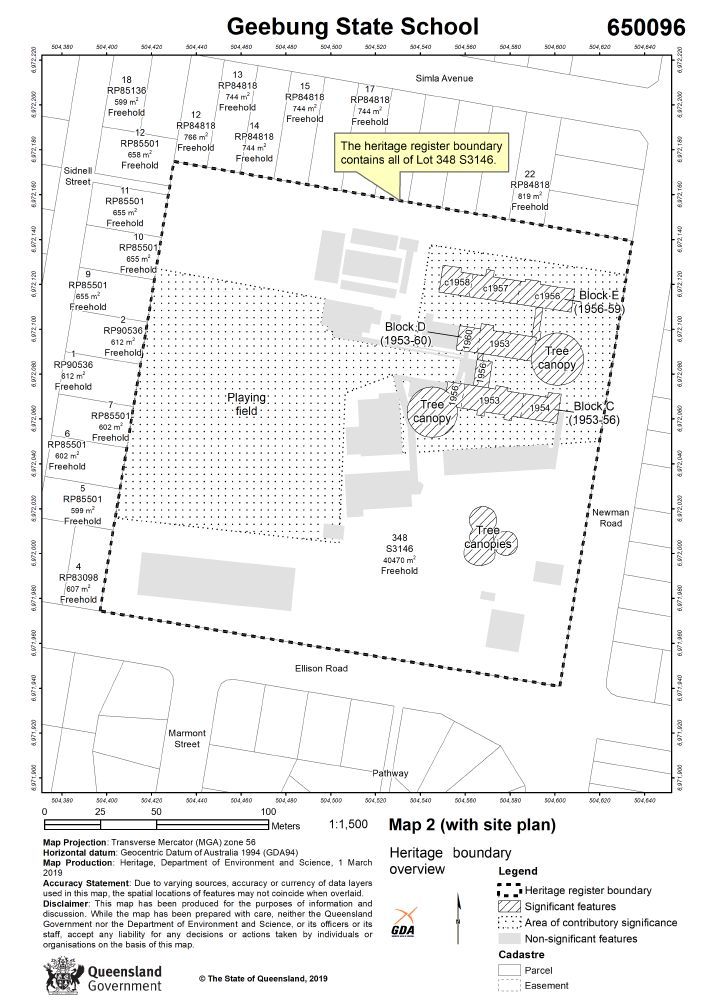
Site map, 2019

Geebung State School occupies a 4.05-hectare (10.0-acre) site in the residential suburb of Geebung, approximately 12 kilometres (7.5 mi) north of Brisbane CBD. Positioned on a rise, the school is accessed via Newman Road to the east, and is bounded on other sides by Ellison Road to the south and residential properties to the north and west. The school retains a complex of three highset teaching buildings with a highset administration bridging wing, located in the elevated northeast corner of the site and connected by covered walkways. The grounds are well-established, with mature trees, assembly and play areas, and a playing field to the west.

The features of state-level cultural heritage significance within the school complex are:

- 1950s site planning
- Block C – a Boulton & Paul Building (1953, extended 1954), with a DPW-designed extension (1955)
- Block D – a Boulton & Paul Building (1953, extended 1953), with a DPW-designed extension (1960
- Block E – a highset timber school building with semi-enclosed stair (1956, extended c1957 and c1958)
- administration bridging wing (1955)
- Covered walkways – between the administration bridging wing and Block D (highset, 1953), and Blocks D and E (lowset to highset, 1956)
- Landscape features and views – open space, mature trees and playing field

=== Site Planning ===
The site planning is typical of Queensland schools from the 1950s; with the long, narrow buildings linked by covered walkways and surrounded by open-ended courtyard assembly and play spaces. Set higher than and visible from Newman Road, Blocks C (south), D (central) and E (north) are arranged in a staggered, parallel formation, orientated slightly east of north with north-facing verandahs.

=== Blocks C and D: Boulton & Paul buildings (1953, with later extensions) ===
Blocks C and D are long, highset, timber-framed, teaching buildings with gable roofs. The buildings have open play spaces on the ground floor and south-facing classrooms on the first floor, accessed by north-facing verandahs.

The prefabricated Boulton & Paul (B&P) sections comprise the eastern extents of both buildings: Block D – three classrooms and a store room (former hat room); and Block C – six classrooms (western classroom combining former head teacher, teacher and hat rooms). Single room-width extensions (Block D with understorey classroom), at the western end of the B&P sections, are of a similar DPW design.

The first floor and full-height gable-end walls are clad in timber chamferboards, with the B&P sections distinguishable by vertical timber strips that define the prefabricated panels.

The understoreys are open to the north. The enclosed southern sides are clad in a combination of chamferboards and vertical weatherboards (B&P only). Understorey bracing walls, located adjacent to original south-facing openings, have a diagonal boarded finish.

Early timber stairs at the east and west (Block D only) ends of the B&P verandahs are semi-enclosed with a combination of chamferboard cladding and timber-framed glazed screens. Concrete stairs access the understoreys.

=== Block E: Highset timber school building with semi-enclosed stair (1956, extended 1957, c. 1958) ===
Block E is a long, highset, timber-framed teaching building with a gable roof. The building has a north-facing first floor verandah, accessing southern classrooms. Stairs at the west end of the verandah are semi-enclosed with timber-framed glazed screens.

The first floor interior layout comprises six classrooms at the west end, separated from two classrooms at the east end by a passageway that contains timber stairs and connects with the ground-level covered walkway to Block D (due to the sloping site). The classroom at the east end extends the full width of the building.

The understorey is used as play space. Enclosures include a classroom at the west end that features exposed timber trusses, an adjacent room, and walls along the north and south sides of the understorey. South-facing openings access an adjacent concrete walkway and retaining wall.

=== Former administration bridging wing (1955, incorporating 1953 covered walkway) ===
The administration bridging wing is a highset, timber-framed building with a gable roof. It is located along the east side of, and incorporates, the south end of a raised covered walkway between Blocks C and D.

The first floor contains an open-plan computer room (former male and female staff rooms, and former walkway) and a server room (former head teacher's room), with an adjacent east-facing balcony overlooking the courtyard below. The enclosed understorey contains the former north–south walkway alignment and a former medical room in the northeast corner.

=== Covered walkways ===
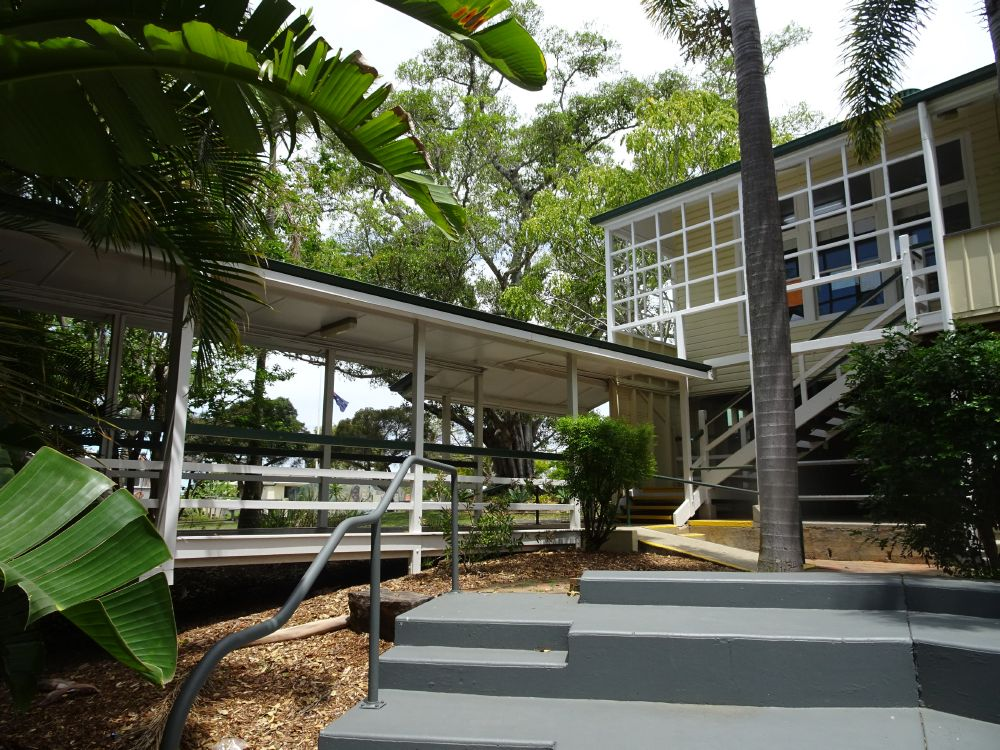
Covered walkway between Blocks D and E, 2018

Covered walkways connect the administration bridging wing and Block D, and Blocks D and E. They have corrugated metal-clad roofs and timber posts.

The raised covered walkway between the administration bridging wing and Block D has a gable roof and open understorey. The upper-level has been enclosed with (non-significant) flat sheeting, glass louvres and metal security grilles.

The covered walkway between Blocks D and E has a skillion roof, timber floor and post-and-rail balustrades. The south end is lowset and has concrete steps, with adjacent planter boxes, that connect to Block D at ground level. The north end is flanked by timber-framed glazed screens and connects with the first floor of Block E, bridging the concrete retaining wall and pathway below.

=== Landscape Features and Views ===
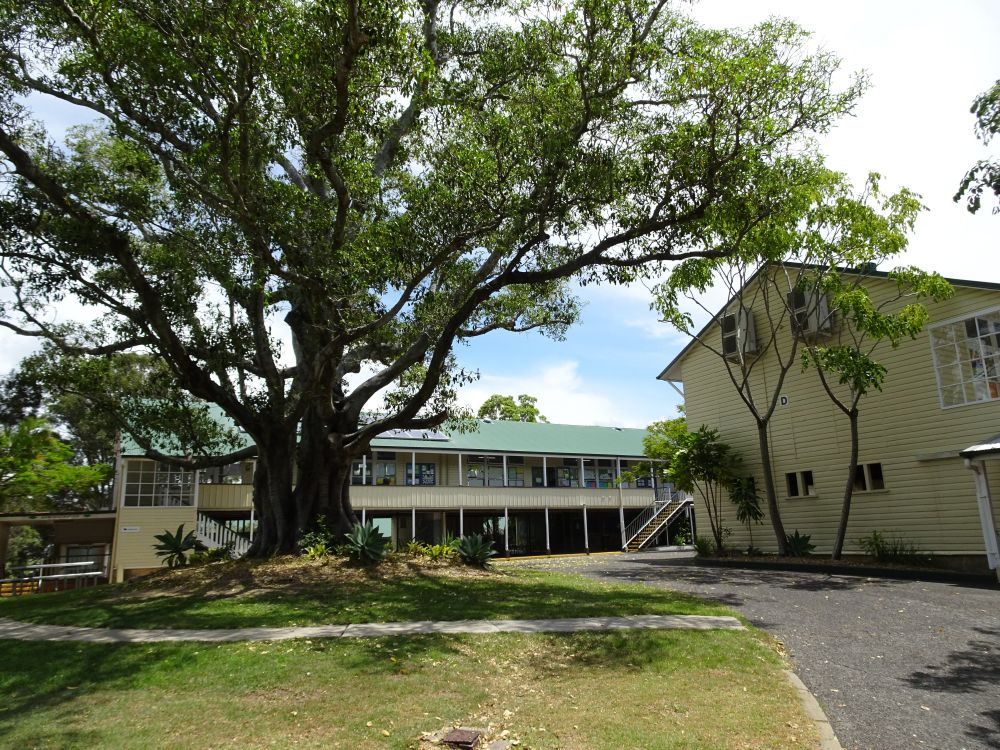
School grounds, 2018

The school grounds are well-established, with mature trees and sporting facilities including a large playing field (c. 1955) on the western side of the site. Standing in their original locations, Blocks C, D and E are surrounded by open space. There is a direct visual relationship between the structures.

Open courtyards between Blocks C and D, and D and E, are characteristic of the 1950s site planning. They are used as open play-space and for assembly.

Open space between and around the buildings facilitates natural light and ventilation, as well as views of the buildings in their original arrangement from Newman Road to the east.

Mature fig trees (Ficus sp.) stand to the east of Block D and southeast of Block C, and a group of four mature mango trees (Magnifera indica) stand near the southeast corner of the school site.

== Heritage listing ==
Geebung State School was listed on the Queensland Heritage Register on 31 May 2019 having satisfied the following criteria.

The place is important in demonstrating the evolution or pattern of Queensland's history.

Geebung State School (established 1953) is important in demonstrating the evolution of state education and its associated architecture in Queensland. The place retains good, representative examples of standard government designs that were architectural responses to prevailing government educational philosophies, set in landscaped grounds with mature trees and provision of assembly and play areas and sporting facilities.

The layout of the buildings and associated open spaces reflect 1950s master planning, which provided for ordered growth from a nucleus.

The Boulton & Paul Buildings: Blocks C (1953, extended 1954) and Block D (1953, extended 1953) demonstrate the introduction and adoption of imported prefabricated systems by the Queensland Government in response to acute building material shortages and population growth in the post-World War II period.

The Department of Public Works (DPW)-designed extensions to Block C (1956) and Block D (1960), the highset timber school building with semi-enclosed stair, Block E, (1956, extended c. 1957, c. 1958) and the administration bridging wing (1956, incorporating 1953 covered way) demonstrate the evolution of DPW designs during the 1950s, based on features of the Boulton & Paul Buildings.

The suburban site with mature trees, assembly and play areas, and sporting facilities, demonstrates the government's recognition of the importance of play and aesthetics in the education of children.

The place is important in demonstrating the principal characteristics of a particular class of cultural places.

Geebung State School is important in demonstrating the principal characteristics of a Queensland state school of the 1950s. These include: 1950s site planning; a range of highset timber-framed buildings of standard designs; and a generous, landscaped site with shade trees, and assembly, play and sports areas.

The site planning is intact and important in demonstrating the principal characteristics of 1950s Queensland state school master planning, which provided for ordered growth from a nucleus. The three long, narrow buildings are arranged in a staggered, parallel formation fanning out from an administration wing; linked by covered walkways around open-ended courtyard assembly and play spaces.

The Boulton & Paul Buildings (Blocks C and D, 1953–54) are good, representative examples of this standard type. They are important in demonstrating the principal characteristics through their: expression of the modular, prefabricated construction in external cladding; timber-framed, lightweight construction; highset, gable-roofed form with play space underneath; northern verandah for circulation; semi-enclosed stairs with timber-framed glazed screens; 24 ft (7.3m) wide classrooms; flat internal wall linings; timber-bracketed eaves; and large banks of timber-framed awning and double-hung windows, with fall-prevention safety rails and window stays.

These Boulton & Paul characteristics are replicated in the subsequent DPW-designed extensions, Block C (1955) and Block D (1960), but without the modular prefabricated construction and fall-prevention safety rails, and with subtle variations in detailing.

The Highset Timber Teaching Building with semi-enclosed stair (Block E 1956–c.58) is a good, intact example of its type, and retains its: highset character with covered play space under; timber-framed, lightweight construction; gable roof; north-facing verandah for circulation; semi-enclosed stairs with timber-framed glazed screens; and large banks of south-facing timber-framed awning windows, with fanlights. Block E demonstrates two iterations of the type: on concrete piers (1956–c.57); and incorporating timber floor trusses (c. 1958).

The place has a strong or special association with a particular community or cultural group for social, cultural or spiritual reasons.

Geebung State School has a strong and ongoing association with past and present pupils, parents, staff members, and the surrounding community through sustained use since its establishment in 1953. The place is important for its contribution to the educational development of Geebung, with generations of children taught at the school, has served as a prominent venue for social interaction and community focus. Contributions to its operations have been made though repeated local volunteer action, donations, and an active Parents and Citizens Association.

Geebung state school has a population of approximately 380 students today. (2026)
