= Brisbane School of Theology =

Coordinates: 27.481°S 152.978°E

- Motto: Shaped by His word; serving His world
- Type: Bible college
- Established: 1943
- Chairperson: Scott Pasley
- Principal: Robert Edwards (Acting Principal)
- Location: Toowong, Queensland
- Website: bst.qld.edu.au

Brisbane School of Theology (BST) is an Australian Bible college in Toowong, Brisbane, Queensland.

BST is a Bible-centred, interdenominational and formational training college. It welcomes residential, non-residential, full-time and part-time students. The college operates on the Toowong Campus and is situated in the foothills of Mount Coot-tha close to the Brisbane CBD.

The college is an affiliated college of the Australian University of Theology (AUT). It offers degrees and diplomas accredited by AUT. It is also linked with other educational bodies in the interest of maintaining high academic standards.

The curriculum is designed to achieve the outcomes described in the college's graduate attributes. It provides a holistic and integrated program of theological education, encompassing the development of the heart (i.e. formation of Christian character for ministry), the head (i.e. acquiring knowledge for ministry) and the hand (i.e. gaining practical skills for ministry). The college's program especially emphasises biblical studies and mission. Other important components of the curriculum are spiritual formation and field education.

== History ==
BST has a history which dates from 1943. The college was known previously by other names that include Crossway College, the Bible College of Queensland (BCQ) and the Queensland Bible Institute (QBI).

The Toowong campus was established by the QBI council in 1947 at Silky Oaks, an historic property situated at Cross Street, Toowong. The home was built by Mr J. S. Thomas and owned for many years by Sir Alfred Cowley (cane farmer, industrialist and parliamentarian), who sold it to L. K. Addison in 1940.

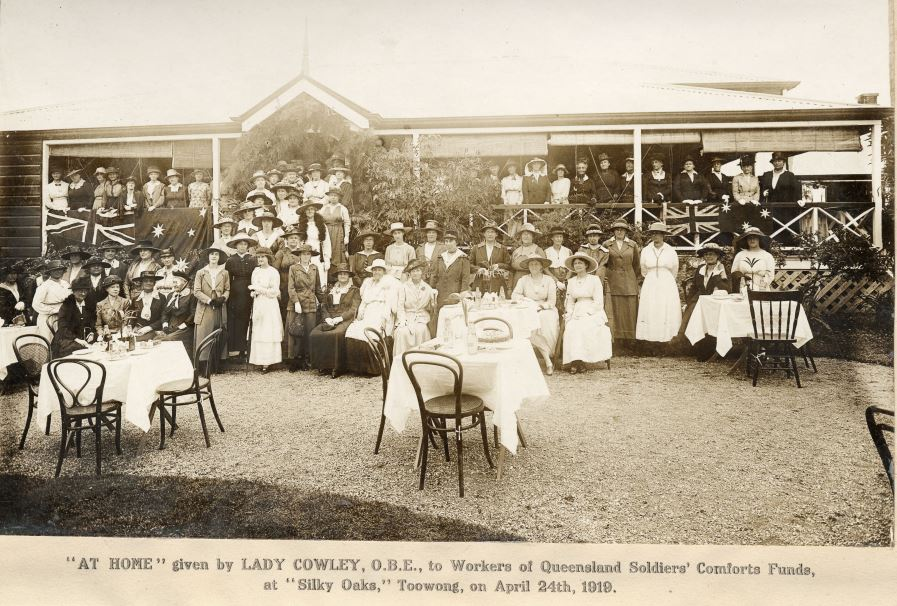
"At Home", given by Lady Cowley to the Workers of Queensland Soldiers' Comforts Funds, at "Silky Oaks", Toowong, on 24 April 1919

The property became the Silky Oaks Children's Haven in 1940 before that facility relocated to Manly. The QBI council rented the property from a Mr Addison. The college was able to accommodate 30–40 students at the new site.

== Principals ==
College principals include:

- The Rev Gwilym J. Morgans (1943–1944)
- The Rev J. Egerton Jacob (1944–1948)
- The Rev Eric E. Potter (1948–1949, 1950–1956)
- The Rev John H. Watson (1949)
- The Rev C. Harold Nicholls (1957–1969)
- The Rev Geoffrey J. Paxton (1971–1976)
- The Rev Keith V. Warren (1976–1977)
- Ken J. Newton (1977–2002)
- Peter Ralphs (2002–2008)
- J. Ferreira (2009–2013)
- The Rev Richard Gibson (2014-2025)
