= Uniting Church in Australia, Synod of Queensland =

The Synod of Queensland or Queensland Synod is a state council of the Uniting Church in Australia.

Synod also describes the regular meeting (every 1.5 years) of representatives of the state-wide church. These meetings are known as the Synod in Session.

== Overview ==
The Assembly of the Uniting Church in Australia is the national council of the Uniting Church, headed by the President of the Uniting Church, with a general secretary as chief executive officer. The six geographically based synods are responsible for overall support and resourcing of the church in their area especially in community services, mission planning, theological education and other educational services, administration relating to ministers, and property and financial services. The elected head of each synod is the Moderator, and a general secretary is usually appointed as the chief executive officer.

The Moderator is the spiritual head and the main spokesperson for the Uniting Church in Queensland. As of 20 October, 2023 the moderator is Reverend Bruce Moore, who was inducted at the 37th Synod on 20 October 2023.

== Presbyteries ==
The Synod of Queensland contains several presbyteries within its bounds. A presbytery is a council of the Uniting Church which has oversight of congregations, ministries and programs within a region. Ministers of the Word and deacons are responsible to their presbytery, which has the duty of caring for them and ensuring their work is carried out faithfully. Presbytery meetings include ordained ministers, lay pastors, and elected lay persons from every congregation.

The Synod of Queensland has seven presbyteries.

- Bremer Brisbane Presbytery
- Carpentaria Presbytery (formerly Calvary Presbytery and North Queensland Presbytery)
- Central Queensland Presbytery
- Mary Burnett Presbytery
- Moreton Rivers Presbytery
- South Moreton Presbytery
- The Downs Presbytery

== Education ==
Trinity College Queensland provides theological education for ministers and laypeople. Degree courses are accredited by the Australian College of Theology.

Raymont Residential College is a residential college for tertiary students. It is co-located at the Uniting Church Centre in Auchenflower, Brisbane with Trinity College Queensland. Grace College is at the St Lucia campus of the University of Queensland and caters only for women.

== Moderators ==
The following individuals have served as the Moderator of the Queensland Synod:

Ordinal	Officeholder	Term start	Term end	Time in office	Notes
1	Rev Prof Rolland Busch	1977	1979	1–2 years	
2	Rev Ronald Elvery	1979	1980	0–1 years	
3	Rev Duncan Harrison	1980	1981	0–1 years	
4	Rev Dr Douglas Brandon	1981	1982	0–1 years	
5	Rev Dr Lewis Born	1982	1983	0–1 years	
6	Rev Alan Kidd	1983	1984	0–1 years	
7	Rev Eric Moore	1984	1985	0–1 years	
8	Rev Ray Hunt OBE	1985	1986	0–1 years	
9	Rev Barry Dangerfield	1986	1987	0–1 years	Recognition withdrawn in 2019
10	Rev Ray Thompson	1987	1988	0–1 years	
11	Rev John Mavor	1988	1989	0–1 years	
12	Rev Don Whebell	1989	1990	1–2 years	
13	Dr John Roulston	1990	1991	0–1 years	First lay person to be Queensland Moderator
14	Rev Bryan Gilmour	1991	1992	0–1 years	
15	Rev Cecil Schloss	1992	1993	0–1 years	
16	Rev Don Whebell	1993	1996	2–3 years	First full time Queensland Moderator
17	Rev Dr David Pitman	1996	1999	2–3 years	
18	Rev Dr Ray Reddicliffe	1999	2002	2–3 years	
19	Rev Allan Kuchler	2002	2005	2–3 years	
(17)	Rev Dr David Pitman	2005	2008	2–3 years	
20	Rev Bruce Johnson	2008	2011	2–3 years	
21	Rev Kaye Ronalds	2011	2014	2–3 years	First female Queensland Moderator
22	Rev David Baker	2014	2020	5–6 years	
23	Rev Andrew Gunton	2020	2023	2 years, 363 days	
24	Rev Bruce Moore	2023	Current	Current	
