= Bible College of South Australia =

- Former name: Adelaide Bible Institute
- Established: 1924
- Principal: Tim Patrick
- Location: Adelaide, Australia; 34.954°S 138.613°E
- Website: www.biblecollege.sa.edu.au

The Bible College of South Australia (BCSA), formerly known as the Adelaide Bible Institute, is an interdenominational and evangelical Bible college in Adelaide, South Australia. It offers courses accredited by the Australian University of Theology. The college's particular focus is on teaching "theology for ministry" and seeing men and women trained to serve in Christian ministry "in Adelaide, South Australia and beyond".

== History ==
The College was established as the Adelaide Bible Institute in 1924 and offered evening classes to train people for missionary service. The founding principal was Allan Burrow. In 1949, the college became residential, first at West Richmond before moving in 1950 to Payneham. It was at this time that the college began to provide full-time ministry training programs. Growing numbers of students meant that, in 1962, the college relocated to Mount Breckan, which provided larger premises in Victor Harbor. In 1962, J. Graham Miller was unable to take up an offer to become principal as he was unwilling to sign the required statement of premillennial belief. Baptist minister Ted Gibson was principal from 1961 to 1964 before moving to Malyon College in Queensland. The Reverend Geoffrey Bingham was principal from 1967 until 1973. Student numbers grew from 40 in 1962 to 100 in 1967, with roughly equal numbers of men and women.

The college was renamed the Bible College of South Australia in 1973 and, in 1978, the strategic decision was made to move back to the city. The former Concordia College girls' boarding house in Malvern was acquired and continues to be the college's home.

In the 1980s, the college was a member of the Adelaide College of Divinity along with the Baptist Burleigh College. In the 1990s, the college with Burleigh offered the Australian College of Theology Bachelor of Theology and Bachelor of Ministry degrees. In 1994, the college had the largest Bible college library in Australia, with over 12,000 volumes. At the end of that decade, they established the South Australian Graduate School of Theology to teach masters and doctoral degrees in addition to undergraduate awards. In 2007, following the closure of Burleigh, the graduate school was amalgamated into the college proper.

== Courses ==
The college offers tertiary qualifications from diploma to postgraduate level, focusing on the Bachelor of Ministry, Bachelor of Theology and Master of Divinity.

== Principals ==
- Allan Burrow
- Geoffrey Bingham (from February 1967 – 1973)
- Bryan Hardman
- Raymond Laird OAM (1991–2000)
