= Kevin Giles =

Australian evangelical Anglican priest (born 1940)

- Born: 1940 (age 85–86)
- Education: Australian College of Theology (PhD)

Kevin N. Giles (born 1940) is an Australian evangelical Anglican priest and theologian who was in parish ministry for over 40 years. He and his family live in Melbourne, Australia. Giles studied at Moore Theological College in Sydney, Durham University, England and Tubingen University, Germany. He has a Doctor of Theology degree from the Australian College of Theology.

Giles has published widely on matters related to the health and growth of the church, some at a popular level and some at an academic level. He has scholarly books on church leadership, the doctrine of the church, the biblical case for gender equality, the doctrine of the Trinity and the doctrine of the eternal generation of the Son. He has been prominent in the debate about the status and ministry of women and the way complementarians have until recently grounded women’s subordination in the Trinity.

In a number of publications, Giles has argued that complementarians have unwittingly embraced the heresy of subordinationism by arguing that the Trinity is "hierarchically" ordered; specifically that the Son is necessarily and eternally subordinated in authority to the Father. Since his subordination is what irrevocably identifies him as the Son in distinction to the Father, a difference in being is implied. In his 2006 book, Jesus and the Father: Modern Evangelicals Reinvent the Doctrine of the Trinity, Giles argued that complementarians had "reinvented" the doctrine of the Trinity to support their views of men and women, adopting a heretical view similar to Arianism. He has consistently argued that the Nicene doctrine of the Trinity, the creeds and confessions exclude any hierarchically ordering in the eternal or immanent Trinity and there is no correlation between a threefold divine relationship in heaven and a twofold, male–female relationship on earth. Regarding the "functional" subordination of the Son, Giles argues that the self-chosen and temporal functional subordination of the Son, as seen in the incarnation (Phil 2:6-8), does not imply the eternal or ontological subordination of the Son. His argument has always been that only the eternal subordination of the Son does this.

In response, Wayne Grudem has argued that the eternal subordination of the Son to the Father is a biblical doctrine, while Dave Miller has argued that it is the historic doctrine of the Church. One review of Giles' 2002 book, The Trinity and Subordinationism, argued that he "intentionally ignores the accepted distinction" between functional and ontological subordination, and that this negatively affects "his reading of modern evangelical writings on the subject."

In 2016, at the annual evangelical theological society in San Antonio, a plenary forum was held on the doctrine of the Trinity. Kevin Giles and Millard Erickson put the case that the Son of God is not eternally subordinated in authority to the Father in the immanent Trinity and Wayne Grudem and Bruce Ware put the case that he is. Mark Woods, in Christianity Today wrote up what happened in this forum. Giles rejected the argument that the Father eternally rules over the Son. He said historic orthodoxy holds that the Father and the Son are both rightly confessed as "the Lord"; both as omnipotent. On the "functional' subordination of the Son, he said he had always argued that the self-chosen and temporal functional subordination of the Son, as seen in the incarnation (Phil 2:6-8), does not imply the eternal or ontological subordination of the Son. His argument has always been that only the eternal subordination of the Son does this.

Woods says, “Giles' lecture is a masterclass in Trinitarian theology. It also represents a determined push-back, in a highly significant evangelical forum, against what is increasingly being seen as an alarming departure from historic Christian teaching by evangelical scholars.”

Grudem and Ware maintained their argument that the Son is eternally subordinated in role and authority to the Father but to the surprise of everyone present, after Giles had spoken, Ware announced that he and Grudem had changed their minds on the doctrine of the eternal generation of the Son that hitherto they had rejected. They now agreed it has strong biblical support. This was a hugely important recantation because in his 2012 book, The Eternal Generation of the Son, Giles argued that this doctrine is foundational to the orthodox doctrine of the Trinity since it guarantees both the eternal distinctions between the Father and the Son and their co-equality. In the Nicene Creed, Christians confess that on the basis of his eternal “begetting”, the Son is “God from God, Light from Light, true God from true God, begotten not made, of one being with the Father.” To confess Jesus in these words, is to confess him as “co-equal God”, exactly what the Athanasian Creed teaches. He is the Son, not the Father, but he is in all other ways one with the Father, definitely "one in being and power as all the Reformation confessions state".

== Books ==
- Giles, Kevin (1977). Women & Their Ministry: a case for equal ministries in the church today. East Malvern, Victoria: Dove Communications. ISBN 978-0-859-24057-4. OCLC 5172623.
- ——— (1989). Patterns of Ministry Among the First Christians. Melbourne, Australia: Collins Dove. ISBN 978-0-859-24729-0. OCLC 20924627.
- ——— (1995). What on Earth is the Church?: An Exploration in New Testament Theology. Downers Grove, IL: InterVarsity Press. ISBN 978-0-830-81868-6. OCLC 33243701.
- ——— (2002). The Trinity & Subordinationism: the doctrine of God and the contemporary gender debate. Downers Grove, IL: InterVarsity Press. ISBN 978-0-830-82663-6. OCLC 48475643.
- ——— (2006). Jesus and the Father: Modern Evangelicals Reinvent the Doctrine of the Trinity. Grand Rapids MI: Zondervan. ISBN 978-0-310-26664-8. OCLC 62509109.
- ——— (2012). The Eternal Generation of the Son: maintaining orthodoxy in Trinitarian theology. Downers Grove, IL: InterVarsity Press. ISBN 978-0-830-83965-0. OCLC 759909803.
- ——— (2017). Patterns of Ministry Among the First Christians, second edition, revised and enlarged. Eugene, OR: Cascade. ISBN 9781620329559. OCLC 22399226.
- ——— (2017). The Rise and Fall of the Complementarian Doctrine of the Trinity. Eugene, OR: Cascade. ISBN 978-1-5326-1866-6. OCLC 4434482827.
- ——— (2018). What the Bible Actually Teaches on Women. Eugene, OR: Cascade. ISBN 978-1-5326-3368-3. OCLC 5558131423.
- ——— (2020). The Headship of Men and the Abuse of Women: Are They in Any Way Related?. Eugene, OR: Cascade. ISBN 978-1-7252-6138-9.
