= Brisbane College of Theology =

Theological college in Brisbane, Australia

Coordinates: 27°28′40.53″S 152°59′35.49″E

Brisbane College of Theology, located in Auchenflower, Brisbane, Queensland, Australia, was an ecumenical theological education consortium (1983–2009), comprising St Francis' Theological College (Anglican), St Paul's Theological College (Roman Catholic), (formerly under the operations of the Pius XII Seminary), and Trinity Theological College (Uniting). The B.C.T was inaugurated on March 28, 1983.

It was based at Raymont Lodge in Auchenflower but effectively operated from this location and also concurrently at Saint Francis Theological College in Milton and Pius XII/ Saint Paul's Theological College at Banyo. The college offered both under-graduate and post-graduate qualifications. It ceased operations as an umbrella organisation for the three colleges in 2009, in part due to the administrative overheads involved in running a small tertiary institution in the Australian higher education system.

From 2009, St Francis' Theological College ran programs through Charles Sturt University, as part of an affiliation agreement with St Mark's National Theological Centre in Canberra. This ceased at the end of 2022, when the college affiliated with the University of Divinity.

Trinity College initially affiliated with the Australian Catholic University, before joining the Australian College of Theology, while St Paul's joined the Australian Catholic University.

== See also ==
- Australian College of Theology
- St Mark's National Theological Centre
- Sydney College of Divinity
- University of Divinity
