= Youthworks College =

Seminaries and theological colleges in New South Wales

Coordinates: 34.0375°S 151.0411°E

Youthworks College is an Australian Bible college based at Moore College in Newtown, New South Wales. It offers diplomas for those interested in children's and youth ministry through the Australian College of Theology. Youthworks College is a ministry of the Anglican Diocese of Sydney.

Youthworks College was founded in 1999 and offers the Year 13 theology course for school leavers and a three year diploma of Theology. The principal is Rev Dr Bill Salier.
