= Sunshine railway station, Brisbane =

Railway station in Queensland, Australia

Sunshine
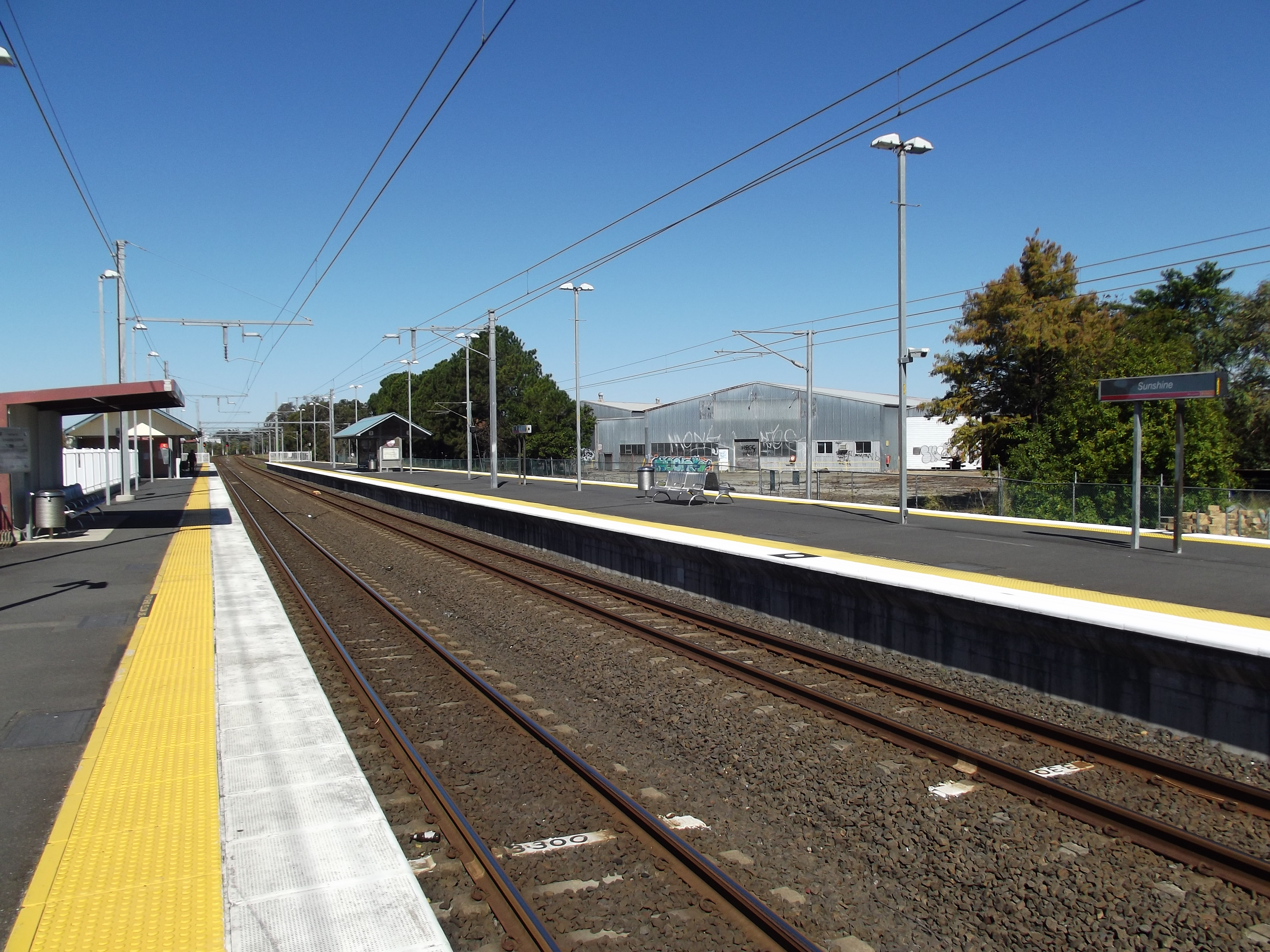
- Southbound view from Platform 1 in August 2012

General information
- Location: Bilsen Road, Geebung
- Coordinates: 27.3756°S 153.0564°E
- Owner: Queensland Rail
- Operator: Queensland Rail
- Line: Redcliffe Peninsula
- Distance: 12.24 kilometres from Central
- Platforms: 3 (1 side, 1 island)

Construction
- Structure type: Ground
- Parking: 82 bays

Other information
- Status: Staffed part-time
- Station code: 600440 (platform 1); 600441 (platform 2); 600442 (platform 3)
- Fare zone: Zone 2
- Website: Queensland Rail

History
- Opened: 11 November 1954; 71 years ago

Services
| Preceding station | Queensland Rail | Following station |
|---|---|---|
| Virginia towards Springfield Central via Roma Street | Redcliffe Peninsula line | Geebung towards Kippa-Ring |
Location

Sunshine is a railway station operated by Queensland Rail on the Redcliffe Peninsula line. It opened in 1954 and serves the Brisbane suburb of Geebung. It is a ground level station, featuring one island platforms with two faces each and one side platform.

== History ==
On 28 August 2000, a third platform opened as part of the addition of a third track from Northgate to Bald Hills.

== Services ==
Sunshine is served by all Citytrain network services from Kippa-Ring to Central, many continuing to Springfield Central

== Services by platform ==
Sunshine platform arrangement
| Platform | Line | Destinations | Notes |
|---|---|---|---|
| 1 | Redcliffe Peninsula | Roma Street & Springfield Central | |
| 1 | Redcliffe Peninsula | Ipswich | 1 weekday afternoon service only |
| 2 | Redcliffe Peninsula | Kippa-Ring | Evening peak only |
| 3 | Redcliffe Peninsula | Kippa-Ring | |
