= Dominic Steele =

Australian Anglican minister

Dominic Steele is an Australian Anglican minister. He is the senior minister of Village Church, Annandale, New South Wales, and works at Christians in the Media. He was formerly a radio journalist and presenter on radio stations 2UE and 2WS. He continued as a news editor in radio and became involved in Anglican churches in Sydney, though he had been raised a Roman Catholic. He later began studying theology at Moore Theological College and was ordained to the Anglican ministry. He is the author and presenter of the course Introducing God, used as a tool by Sydney Anglicans and others for evangelism.

== Career ==
After a start in community radio (2SER and 2RPH) Steele's commercial radio career began at 2MO Gunnedah as morning announcer. He switched to 2UE as a journalist in 1985 first covering police rounds, then rural news, then news editing. He was 2UE’s only journalist at the 1988 Olympic Games. Although he grew up Roman Catholic, Steele says it was while at 2UE that he was introduced to God through his friendship with the 2UE's deputy news director Russell Powell. He then switched to 2WS where he edited and presented various news shifts. In 1992, Steele left 2WS to work as an apprentice to then Anglican chaplain at UNSW Phillip Jensen before studying at Moore Theological College.

Steele and Powell founded Christians in the Media in 1997 with Steele as its first staff worker. Christians in the Media focuses on ministry to communications students, workplace bible study groups among media workers and occasional events. Highlights include national Christian media workers conferences 'Access All Areas' in 2005 and 2008 with presenters including Kevin Rudd, Donald McDonald, David Aikman and Mark Scott.

In 2003, Steele authored the evangelistic course, Introducing God. The course has been used by 2000 Australian churches and in many other countries around the world. The course is an evangelism course based on the relationship teachings of the Alpha course, but its contents are modelled from the "Two ways to live" tract by Matthias Media. He also spoke extensively at churches and training seminars in 2004-2006 training pastors and church leaders in connecting with postmodern Australians.

Steele was ordained in the Anglican Diocese of Sydney where he is a member of the diocese's synod, standing committee, mission board and the South Sydney Regional Council. Steele was appointed as lay minister in charge of St Aidan's Anglican Church in Annandale in 2002. He was ordained in 2003 and remained in charge of St Aidan's. In 2004 St Aidan's changed its name to Annandale Community Church and then in 2009 to Village Church, Annandale.

In 2011, Steele and one of the Annandale Church parish councillors were exonerated in a defamation case brought by a parishioner in the Supreme Court in Sydney.

== Personal life ==
He became a committed Christian after a radio colleague, Russell Powell, invited him to his church in 1985.

Steele is married to Cathie and is the father of three children. They live in Sydney's inner west.
