= Geoffrey Bingham =

Australian writer and minister

The Reverend Geoffrey Bingham AM, MM
- Born: 6 January 1919; Goulburn, New South Wales
- Died: 3 June 2009 (aged 90)
- Education: Moore Theological College
- Occupation: Cleric
- Spouse: Laurel (née Chapman)
- Parent(s): Horace Bingham and Eileen (née Dowling)
- Awards: Military Medal
- Website: geoffreybingham.com

Geoffrey Cyril Bingham, AM, MM (6 January 1919 – 3 June 2009) was an Australian author and cleric in the Anglican Church of Australia.

Geoffrey Bingham was born in Goulburn, New South Wales.

He was awarded the Military Medal for service in Singapore before its fall in World War II, after which he was a prisoner of war at Changi Prison and Kranji Prison. His citation for the Member of the Order of Australia (2005) was "for service to the community through Christian ministry, encouraging cross-cultural theological education and as an author".

He trained at Moore Theological College, ministered at the Garrison Church in Sydney and then served as a missionary under the aegis of the Church Missionary Society (CMS) in Pakistan from 1957 to 1967, where he was founding principal of the Pakistan Bible Training Institute in Hyderabad, Pakistan. He was also one of the founding members of the Austral–Asian Christian Church (AACC).

From 1967 to 1973 he was principal of the Bible College of South Australia (then the Adelaide Bible Institute) after which he formed New Creation Publications (later New Creation Teaching Ministry).

Geoffrey was a gifted writer. Before the war he wrote short stories for The Bulletin. NCTM published close to 300 of his books, most of which were theological.
