= Australian University of Theology =

Australian theological college consortium

- Other name: AUT
- Type: Collegiate theological university
- Established: Australian College of Theology (ACT) 2 October 1891; 135 years ago; Australian University of Theology (AUT) 20 December 2024; 21 months ago
- Founder: Anglican Church
- Accreditation: TEQSA
- Chancellor: David Hurley
- Dean: James Dalziel
- Location: 33 York Street, Sydney, New South Wales, 2000, Australia
- Website: aut.edu.au

The Australian University of Theology (AUT), formerly known as the Australian College of Theology (ACT), is a collegiate theological university based in Sydney, New South Wales. The university grants degrees in ministry and theology. It is one of two major consortia of theological colleges in Australia, alongside the University of Divinity. Over 23,000 people have graduated since the foundation of the institution. On 7 October 2022, it was granted university college status by the Tertiary Education Quality and Standards Agency and on 20 December 2024, TEQSA confirmed a decision to register the college as a university.

The current vice-chancellor is James Dalziel, and the deputy vice-chancellor (research) is Edwina Murphy.

== History ==
The organisation was established by the 1891 general synod of the Church of England in Australia and Tasmania. It was founded in order to provide for the "systematic study of divinity", especially among clergy and ordination candidates, there being no realistic opportunities for them to earn a Bachelor of Divinity (BD) degree at English universities and Australian universities refusing to offer theological education.

The AUT is a national consortium of affiliated colleges with 16 theological and Bible colleges approved to deliver its accredited courses. Around 2,500 individual active students and research candidates, are enrolled in courses each year.

The organisation became a higher education provider (HEP) under the Higher Education Support Act 2003 (Cth).

As of September 2007, the organisation is a company limited by guarantee.

In addition, as a HEP under the Higher Education Support Act, the organisation was required to undergo a quality audit conducted by the Australian Universities Quality Agency (AUQA). In November 2006, the college was the first non-self-accrediting HEP to be audited. The AUQA audit report was completed in January 2007 and publicly released on the AUQA website in February 2007. The process was repeated in 2011 and the college underwent a Cycle 2 quality audit by AUQA. The report of the audit was publicly released on the website of the Tertiary Education Quality and Standards Agency (TEQSA) in March 2012.

In 2010, the organisation received self-accrediting authority meaning it could accredit its own courses in theology and ministry within the scope of the self-accrediting authority specified by the Department of Education and Training in New South Wales. In 2016, ACT applied to become an Australian University of Specialisation which was refused by TEQSA. ACT appealed to the Administrative Appeals Tribunal (AAT) on 9 July 2021. During the appeal process, on 7 October 2022, TEQSA granted ACT university college status. In October 2024, the tribunal decision was that ACT met the requirements for registration as an Australian university, and the TEQSA Commission "confirmed the decision to register the Australian College of Theology in the Australian University category on 20 December 2024". Based on updates to its constitution in early 2025, it was renamed as Australian University of Theology. David Hurley became the inaugural chancellor.

== Affiliated colleges ==
New South Wales

- Chinese Theological College Australia (Independent)
- Christ College (Presbyterian)
- Mary Andrews College (Anglican)
- Morling College (Baptist)
- Sydney Missionary and Bible College (Independent)
- Youthworks College (Anglican)

New Zealand

- Laidlaw College, Auckland (Independent)

Queensland

- Brisbane School of Theology (Independent)
- the Brisbane campus of Morling College
- Queensland Theological College (Presbyterian)
- Trinity College Queensland (Uniting)

South Australia

- Bible College of South Australia (Independent)

Victoria

- Melbourne School of Theology (Independent)
- Presbyterian Theological College (Presbyterian)
- Reformed Theological College (Reformed)
- Ridley College (Anglican)

Western Australia

- Trinity Theological College (Independent)
- the Perth campus of Morling College

== Courses ==
The courses of the university are accredited by the Australian University of Theology, under approval as a self-accrediting provider.

- Undergraduate Certificate of Theology
- Undergraduate Certificate of Ministry
- Diploma of Theology
- Diploma of Ministry
- Diploma of Theology / Diploma of Ministry
- Diploma of Christian Foundations
- Advanced Diploma of Theology
- Advanced Diploma of Ministry
- Associate Degree of Ministry
- Associate Degree of Theology
- Bachelor of Christian Studies
- Bachelor of Theology
- Bachelor of Ministry
- Bachelor of Theology / Bachelor of Ministry
- Bachelor of Divinity
- Bachelor of Theology (Honours)
- Bachelor of Ministry (Honours)
- Graduate Certificate of Divinity
- Graduate Diploma of Divinity
- Master of Ministry
- Master of Divinity
- Master of Divinity / Graduate Diploma of Divinity
- Graduate Certificate of Pastoral Care for Mental Health
- Graduate Certificate of Christian Mentoring
- Graduate Certificate of Christian Leadership
- Graduate Certificate of Leadership
- Master of Christian Leadership
- Master of Arts (Christian Studies)
- Master of Intercultural Studies
- Master of Professional Ministry
- Master of Theological Studies
- Master of Missional Leadership
- Master of Theology (Research)
- Doctor of Ministry
- Doctor of Philosophy

== List of heads ==
There have been nine heads of the institution, who were firstly known as the Registrar, then as the Dean, and now the Vice-Chancellor since 2025. The title of Registrar has been used since 2017 for a staff role (held by Simon Davies since 2017) but this is not a head of instituition position. Heads of the institution include:

- The Reverend Canon William Hey Sharp, Registrar, 1896–1927
- The Venerable John Forster, Registrar, 1928–1945
- The Reverend Canon Frank Cash, Registrar, 1946–1960
- The Reverend Canon Colin H. Duncan, Registrar, 1961–1973
- The Reverend Canon Stuart Babbage, registrar, 1973–1991
- The Reverend John Pryor, Dean, 1991–1995
- The Reverend Mark Harding, Dean, 1996–2016
- The Reverend Martin Sutherland, Dean, 2016–2020
- James Dalziel, Dean from 2020-2025, Vice-Chancellor from 2025 to present

== Notable alumni ==
- Peter Adam, former principal of Ridley College (Melbourne)
- John Armstrong, Anglican bishop
- Robert J. Banks, biblical scholar and practical theologian
- Paul Barker, bishop in the Anglican Church of Australia
- Paul Barnett, Anglican bishop, ancient historian and New Testament scholar
- Geoffrey Bingham, former principal of the Bible College of South Australia
- Brad Billings, Anglican bishop
- Peter Carnley, former Anglican Primate of Australia
- Ross Clifford, Baptist theologian, political commentator, radio personality and author
- Gordon Cheng, author
- Richard Condie, Anglican Bishop of Tasmania
- Peter Corney, Anglican cleric and theologian
- Mark Durie, scholar in linguistics and theology
- John Dickson, apologist, historian and founder of the Centre for Public Christianity
- John Fleming, priest and bioethicist
- Michael Frost, Baptist missiologist
- Kevin Giles, author and Anglican priest
- Graeme Goldsworthy, evangelical Anglican theologian
- Harry Goodhew, Anglican Archbishop of Sydney from 1993 to 2001
- John Harrower, eleventh Anglican Bishop of Tasmania
- Alan Hirsch, missional thinker and author
- Philip Edgecumbe Hughes, New Testament scholar, professor at Westminster Theological Seminary
- Grenville Kent, academic, film producer, author and Christian communicator
- Norman Lacy, politician and Victorian Government minister 1979 to 1982
- Marcus Loane, former Anglican Archbishop of Sydney, and former Anglican Primate of Australia
- Leon Morris, New Testament scholar
- Dianne "Di" Nicolios, Anglican archdeacon
- Michael Raiter, former principal of the Melbourne School of Theology
- Keith Rayner, former Anglican Primate of Australia
- Charles Sherlock, theologian
- Geoffrey Smith, current Anglican Primate of Australia
- Ray Smith, Anglican bishop
- Dominic Steele, Anglican priest and podcaster
- Daniel Willis, former CEO of the Bible Society in New South Wales
- Bruce W. Winter, New Testament scholar

== Notable faculty and staff ==
- Peter Adam, former principal of Ridley College
- Michael Bird, academic dean at Ridley College
- Ross Clifford, principal of Morling College
- Mark Durie, lecturer at Melbourne School of Theology
- John Dickson, fellow and lecturer at Ridley College
- Michael Frost, lecturer at Morling College
- Peter Jensen, retired Australian Anglican bishop, theologian and academic, Moore College (when part of the ACT)
- Leon Morris, former principal of Ridley College
