= Raymont Residential College =

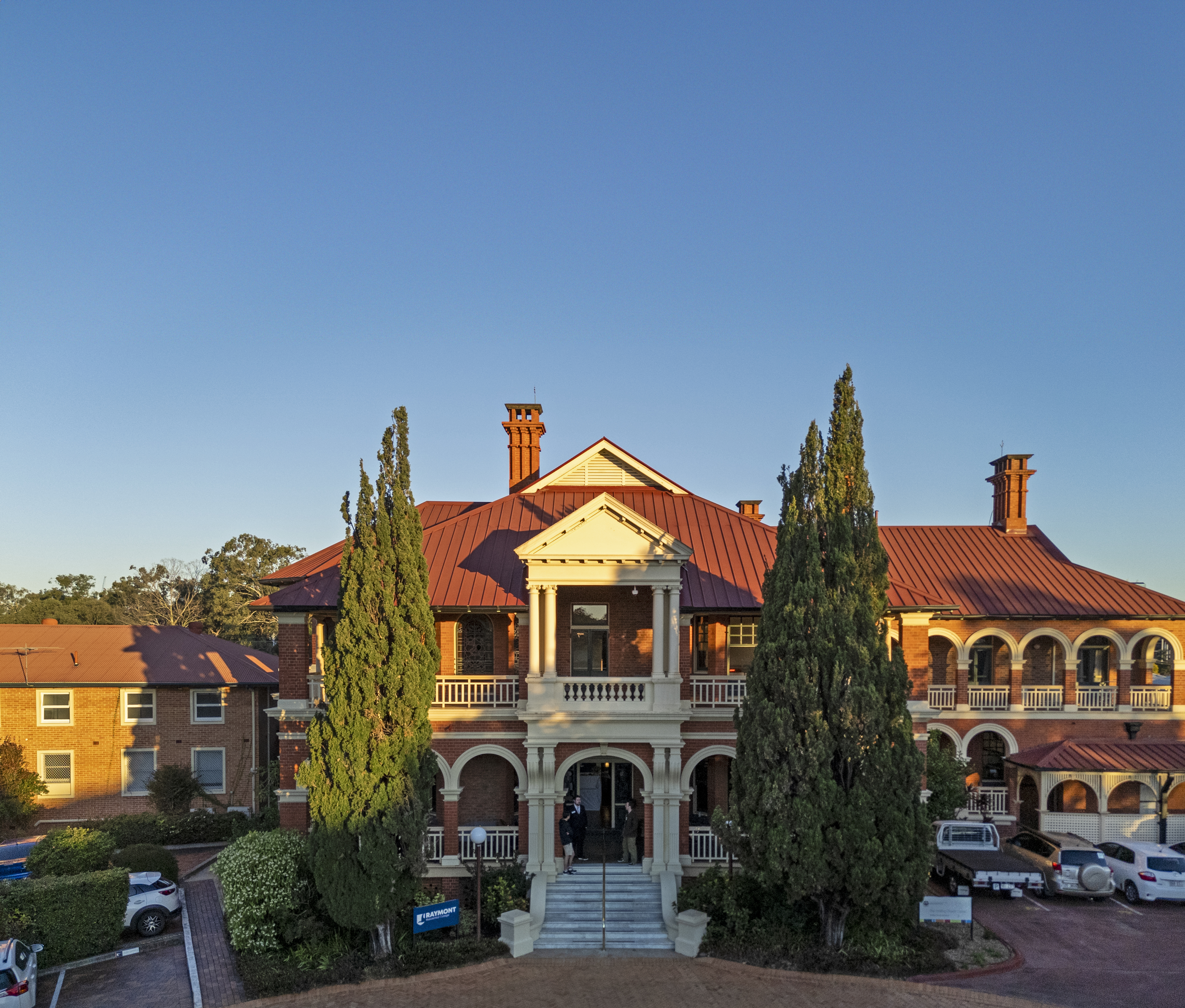
- Raymont Residential College

- Location within Queensland
- 27.4778°S 152.9931°E
- Location: 47 Cadell Street, Toowong, City of Brisbane, Queensland, Australia

History
- Design period: 1900–1914 (early 20th century)
- Built: c. 1904–c. 1905

Site notes
- Architect: Claude William Chambers
- Owner: Uniting Church in Australia

Queensland Heritage Register
- Official name: Raymont Lodge, Drysllwyn
- Type: state heritage (landscape, built)
- Designated: 21 October 1992
- Reference no.: 600051
- Significant period: 1900s early (fabric); 1900s–1970s (historical)
- Significant components: carriage way/drive, trees/plantings, gate – entrance, stained glass window/s, residential accommodation – main house, fence/wall – perimeter

Raymont Residential College (commonly known as Raymont College) is a student residential college with its offices in Drysllwyn, a heritage-listed mansion at 47 Cadell Street, on the border of Toowong and Auchenflower, City of Brisbane, Queensland, Australia. It is an activity of the Uniting Church in Australia, Queensland Synod. The college shares its grounds with Trinity College Queensland and the Queensland Synod office. It was designed by architect Claude William Chambers and built c.1904 to c.1905. It is also known as Raymont Lodge and Drysllwyn. Drysllwyn was added to the Queensland Heritage Register on 21 October 1992.

== History ==
This large, two-storey brick residence was built c.1904 to c.1905 for mining entrepreneur William Davies. Davies, who was involved in the gold industry in Gympie, moved to Brisbane around the turn of the century and purchased the Auchenflower site in 1903.

Architect Claude Chambers, whose Brisbane work spanned fifty years (1885–1935), won a competition to design the residence known as Drysllwyn. The building was large and spacious with richly decorated main interior spaces. The ground floor contained dining, breakfast and drawing rooms, library, kitchen, bathroom, laundry and storerooms. On the first floor were located a main bedroom with dressing room and bathroom, two other bedrooms, another bathroom, a visitor's room and servant's bedroom. Verandas on two levels enclosed the building on three sides. The grounds contained a formal garden.

During the 1930s part of the property was subdivided for residential development. The Davies family resided at Drysllwyn until February 1942, when it was leased to the Presbyterian and Methodist Schools Association for use by Somerville House as a day school. Somerville House had been forced to vacate temporarily their property at South Brisbane for use as administrative headquarters for the United States Army.

In 1944–1945 the property was acquired by the Methodist Church (one of the foundational denominations of the Uniting Church in Australia), and converted into a hostel for country girls studying in Brisbane. The hostel was opened in August 1945 and the building renamed Raymont Lodge, in honour of Mrs E Raymont who had made a substantial bequest to the Methodist Church.

The hostel was run under the auspices of the Central Methodist Mission. A parsonage for the Superintendent of the Central Methodist Mission was erected in the western corner of the property facing Cadell Street. By the 1960s a new dormitory wing had been added to house both male and female students.

During the 1980s major changes occurred on the site with the Uniting Church relocating its state headquarters and Trinity Theological College (now known as Trinity College Queensland) sharing the grounds. A three-storey brick office building was erected at the rear of Drysllwyn and facing Bayliss Street. A new residential building was built to promote accommodation for tertiary students. Conservation work was undertaken on Drysllwyn during this period.

== Present use ==
Raymont Residential College currently hosts accommodation for up to 130 tertiary students, divided between two housing blocks, known as Alcorn and Primmer and four houses, which are typically reserved for senior students. Due to its central location and access to public transport, many of these students attend the University of Queensland, Queensland University of Technology, the Queensland Conservatorium of Music, Queensland College of Art Southbank TAFE, and Griffith University. Krishna Stanton is the current principal of the college.

== Description ==
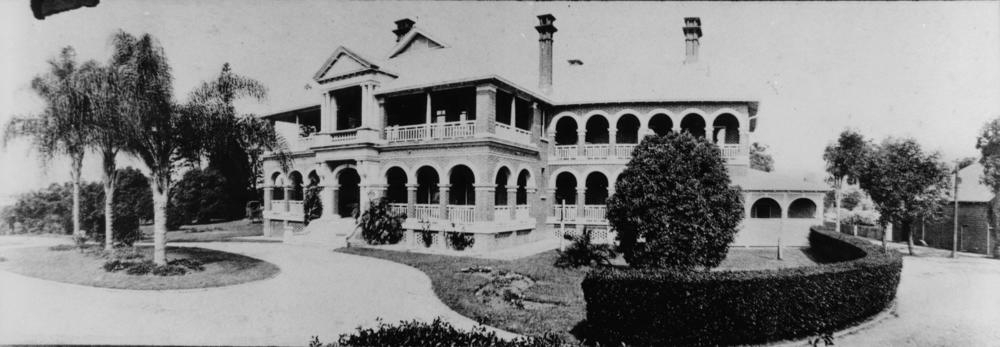
Raymont Lodge, 1944

The college campus consists of two accommodation blocks and other facilities located in houses onsite, with the offices in the historic mansion Drysllwyn. This building, situated on the crest of a rise overlooking Auchenflower, is a large, two-story red brick residence built in the Federation style. The building has a half-gabled roof of broad profile, rolled edge iron sheeting with a projecting hipped bay to the northeast and southeast, a pedimented entry porch to the northwest and elaborately detailed chimneys.

The building has deep verandas with arched masonry arcades and timber balustrade to the north, east and west. The entry porch is approached via a wide flight of steps and has paired columns to the first floor supporting the pediment. French doors with fanlights and step-out sash windows open onto the verandas. The timber-panelled main entry door is set in a large arched brick opening with stained glass fanlight and sidelights. A bathroom opening off the southeast veranda has a similarly elaborate doorway.

The interior features decorative stained glass, ornate plaster mouldings and finely detailed cedar staircases, joinery, panelling and fireplace surrounds.

The building is approached via a paved drive and turning circle from the northwest, with most of the recently constructed buildings being located to the north, east and south of the building leaving the Cadell Street aspect intact. The grounds contain a number of mature trees, with an in-ground swimming pool to the northwest.

Although much of the site has been subdivided and sold for suburban housing, remnants of the original landscaping survive, as does a section of masonry perimeter fence, with iron entrance gates, which extends to the corner of Cadell Street and Park Avenue, returning along the latter.

== Heritage listings ==
Raymont Lodge (Drysllwyn) was listed on the Register of the National Estate on 25 March 1986.

Raymont Lodge (Drysllwyn) was listed on the Queensland Heritage Register on 21 October 1992 having satisfied the following criteria.

The place is important in demonstrating the evolution or pattern of Queensland's history.
Raymont Lodge is important in demonstrating the principal characteristics of a substantial Federation-style residence.
Raymont Lodge is important in exhibiting aesthetic characteristics valued by the community, in particular, the quality and craftsmanship of its main interior spaces and the streetscape contribution of the building and grounds.
Raymont Lodge has a special association with the life of mining entrepreneur William Davies, the domestic work of architect Claude Chambers and the benevolent work of the Methodist Church.
The place is important in demonstrating the principal characteristics of a particular class of cultural places.
Raymont Lodge is important in demonstrating the principal characteristics of a substantial Federation-style residence.
The place is important because of its aesthetic significance.
Raymont Lodge is important in exhibiting aesthetic characteristics valued by the community, in particular, the quality and craftsmanship of its main interior spaces and the streetscape contribution of the building and grounds.
The place has a special association with the life or work of a particular person, group or organisation of importance in Queensland's history.
Raymont Lodge has a special association with the life of mining entrepreneur William Davies, the domestic work of architect Claude Chambers and the benevolent work of the Methodist Church.
