= John Robert O'Toole =

Australian teacher, academic and author

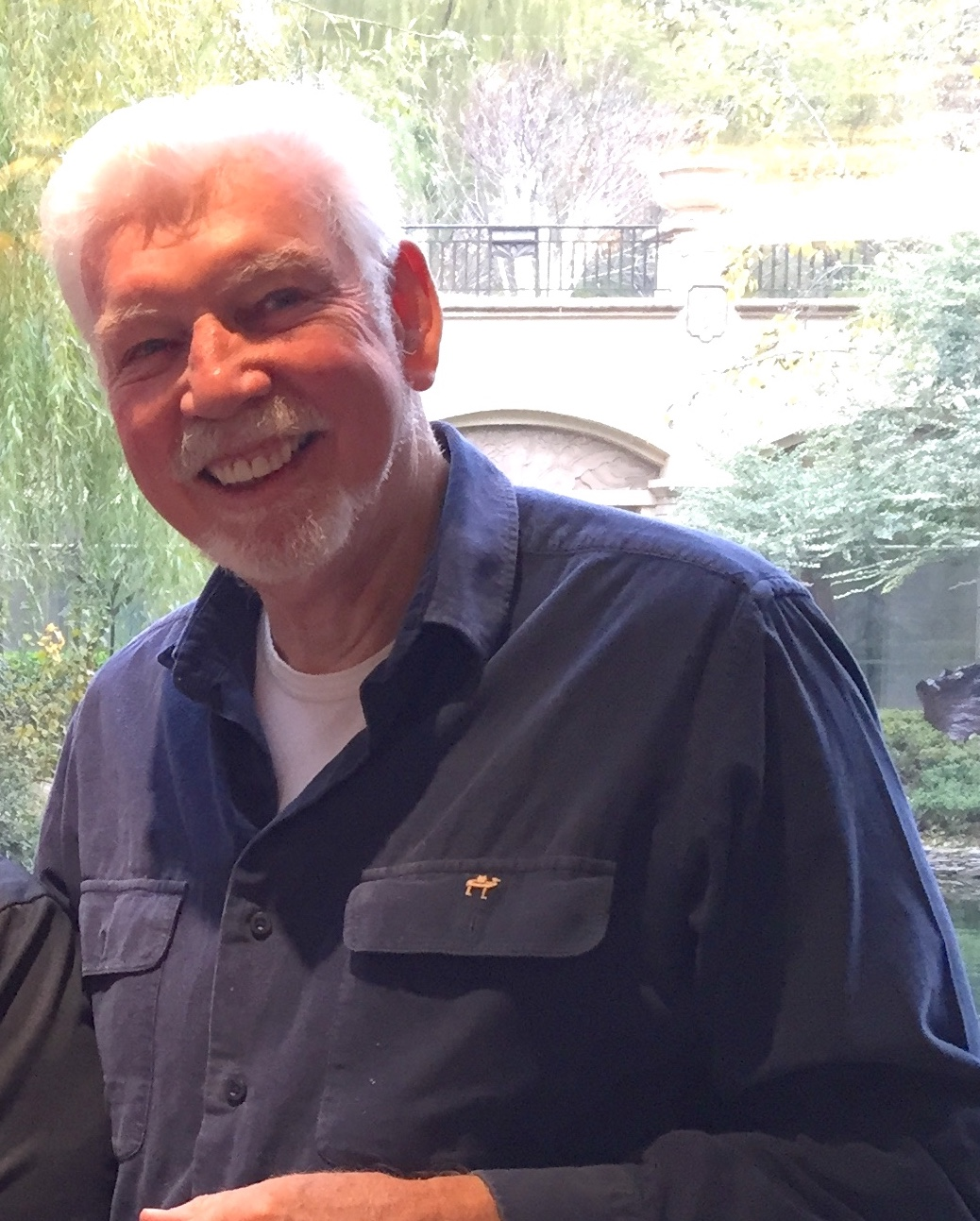
- Born: United Kingdom
- Occupations: Teacher, academic and author
- Awards: Member, Order of Australia [AM] (2014); President's Award, Drama Australia (2003); Judith Kase Cooper Lifetime Research Award, American Alliance for Theater and Education (2001)

Academic background
- Education: B.A., English; M.A. Advanced Diploma, Drama in Education; MEd; PHD
- Alma mater: Cambridge University; Durham University; University of Newcastle upon Tyne; University of Queensland

John Robert O'Toole is an Australian teacher, academic and author.

O'Toole is most known for his works on drama education and applied theatre, all with an emphasis on collaborative learning, curriculum development, culture, politics, and education. His most influential publication is his 1992 book The Process of Drama. Among other notable works are his publications in academic journals, including Teaching Education as well as books such as Educational Research: Creative Thinking and Doing and plays titled The Beekeeper's Boy and Twilight Valley Blues. Moreover, he is the recipient of the 2001 Judith Kase-Cooper Honorary Research Award from the American Alliance for Theater and Education.

== Education ==
O'Toole earned his B.A. in English from Cambridge University in 1962, followed by an M.A. from the same university in 1965. He received an Advanced Diploma in Drama Education from Durham University in 1971, and an MEd from the University of Newcastle upon Tyne in 1977. Later, he obtained a PHD from the University of Queensland in 1991.

== Career ==
O'Toole commenced his academic journey teaching English at state schools across England from 1963 to 1975. Following this, he moved to Australia as lecturer in drama at N. Brisbane College of Advanced Education from 1976 to 1979, where he was also co-founder of the Queensland and National Associations for Drama in Education (now Drama Queensland and Drama Australia). Between 1981 and 1985, he served as a lecturer in drama at Brisbane CAE, and from 1985 to 1991 as Head of Primary Expressive Arts. Following the amalgamation of Brisbane CAE and Griffith University in 1991, he held the position of associate professor in drama at Griffith University, subsequently becoming a professor of drama and applied theatre at the same institution from 2002 to 2005. In 2005 he became the foundation chair of arts education at the University of Melbourne, a post he held until 2010. Since 2010, he has held the title of honorary professorial fellow at the University of Melbourne, and from 2012 to 2019 the title of honorary, then adjunct professor at Griffith University.

In 1971, O'Toole co-founded Durham Theatre in Education and worked there until 1975. He co-produced and wrote the inaugural theatre in education program for Peter O'Connor's New Zealand Everyday Theatre (2006), titled replay@timeout. In 1980 he was Education Officer at Tynewear Theatre, Newcastle, during a year back in the UK. In 2004-5 he founded and wrote the initial programs for Griffith University Flying Drama School theatre in education company. He was a founder-member of IDEA, the International Association for Drama and Education, in 1992, and co-convened the 1995 IDEA World Congress of Drama/Theatre and Education in Brisbane, then assumed the role of director of publications for IDEA from 1996 to 2004. His most substantial educational contribution was from 2009 to 2013, as Lead Writer for the Arts and for Drama in the Australian National Curriculum. Later, he chaired the board of the Queensland Flying Arts Alliance from 2015 to 2020.

== Works ==
O'Toole has authored publications including school textbooks, research works, plays and articles throughout his career. In 1977, after a year's fellowship at the University of Newcastle upon Tyne, he published the book Theatre in Education: New Objectives for Theatre, New Techniques in Education. This book is an examination of a growing sector within education, offering an exploration of theatre in education, its origins, and its evolution alongside shifts in both theatrical practices and educational methodologies. Later in 1987, he collaborated with Brad Haseman in Dramawise: An Introduction to the Elements of Drama, (now revised by the authors in 2017 as Dramawise Reimagined). The book is a guide for teaching drama in middle secondary school. It is directly addressed to students, emphasizing the creation of fictional worlds through application of the basic elements of drama by role-plays and improvisations, and also providing examples from well-known playscripts to develop themes and prepare for performances. His theoretical and philosophical underpinning of Dramawise became a book as The Process of Drama, published in 1992. In 1996, he co-edited Drama, Culture and Empowerment with Kate Donelan, wherein he argued for valuing global diversity in drama and education, highlighting that while practitioners face common challenges, culturally distinct approaches are valid and enriching in their specific contexts. The book was reviewed by Joe Winston, who said "The book embodies a philosophy which embraces this cultural diversity, encouraging us to recognise that what is happening in our field elsewhere may be different from what we as individuals do but is nonetheless right for that elsewhere. It becomes a platform for our global community of drama educators to share one another's elsewhere, to celebrate what unites us and to understand what makes each of us particular."

O'Toole's role in the 1997–2006 international DRACON research study focused on conflict resolution in schools, arguing that drama can effectively give students the skills to manage conflict situations, by letting them explore, explain, replay, and rework conflicts in safe settings. As a major outcome of this research, he co-authored a book with Bruce Burton titled Cooling Conflicts in 2005, wherein they outlined an approach for managing conflict and bullying in schools by combining theoretical insights with practical drama-based strategies and large-scale peer-teaching, to empower students and foster a positive school environment.

In 2009, O'Toole led the writing of a study of the history and development of Australian drama in schools: Drama and Curriculum: The giant at the door; and also co-wrote (with Neryl Jeanneret and Chris Sinclair, and other colleagues) a teacher's handbook for teaching the arts in schools: Education in the Arts: teaching and learning in the contemporary curriculum. In the same year, he published a paper wherein he critically examined the development, production, and implementation of Everyday Theatre's replay@timeout program within the context of theatre in education, process drama, and applied theatre. The study detailed its aesthetic, pedagogical, and logistical decisions, as well as its strengths, weaknesses, and the negotiation process involved in realizing its essential principles.

O'Toole's 2010 collaborative book with David Beckett Educational Research: Creative Thinking and Doing is a guide to research for teachers and teacher education students. It covers basic principles, theoretical approaches, and practical processes of conducting research in educational contexts, including the concept of creativity as an important aspect of some educational research. The book also covers issues in policy, schools, and classrooms while also highlighting contemporary trends like mixed methodology and collaborative research. His 2011 book titled Performing Research: Tensions, Triumphs and Trade-Offs of Ethnodrama, with Judith Ackroyd, explored the complexities and challenges of using ethnodrama as a method of research engagement and dissemination, providing case studies and critical examination of projects in fields such as education, health, and community studies. His 2019 co-authored book Researching Conflict, Drama and Learning explored how educational drama, as employed in his earlier research project DRACON, contributes to conflict management and transformation among school students and many other age-groups and communities world-wide, detailing its principles, methodologies, successes, challenges, and global influences. In his 2021 retrospective article "The basic principles of a socially just arts curriculum, and the place of drama", he provided an analysis of the development of the Australian Curriculum for the Arts, emphasizing its commitment to equity and excellence, and explored how these principles were embodied in the Drama curriculum to foster empathy and inquiry among students. More recently, in 2020, he and Julie Dunn co-wrote Stand Up For Literature, a text-book for teaching English literature through drama. Moreover, in 2022, he co-authored Insights in Applied Theatre: The Early Days and Onwards, an exploration of the development, practices, and key themes in applied theatre, featuring influential articles curated around topics such as power dynamics, partnerships, and giving voice to marginalized communities.

== Awards and honors ==
- 2000 – Life Member, Drama Queensland
- 2001 – Judith Kase-Cooper Honorary Research Award, American Alliance for Theater and Education
- 2003 – President's Award, Drama Australia
- 2013 – Life Member, National Drama UK
- 2014 – Member of the Order of Australia (AM)

== Bibliography ==
=== Books ===
- Theatre in Education: New Objectives for Theatre, New Techniques in Education (1976) ISBN 9780340206171
- Dramawise: An introduction to the elements of drama (1987) ISBN 0858594110
- The Process of drama: Negotiating art and meaning. (1992) ISBN 0415082447
- Cooling conflict: A new approach to managing bullying and conflict in schools (2005) ISBN 9781740911214
- Drama and curriculum: A giant at the door (2009) ISBN 9781402093692
- Education in the arts: Teaching and learning in the contemporary curriculum. (2009) ISBN 9780195560565
- Educational research: Creative thinking and doing. (2010/2013). ISBN 9780195518313
- Performing research: tensions, triumphs and trade-offs of ethnodrama. (2010) ISBN 9781858564463
- Dramawise reimagined: Learning to manage the elements of drama (2017) ISBN 9781925005899
- Researching drama, conflict and learning: The international DRACON project (2019) ISBN 9789811359156
- Stand up for literature: Dramatic approaches in the secondary English classroom. (2020) ISBN 9781760622862
- Insights in applied theatre: The early days and onwards (2022) ISBN 9781789385243

=== Selected articles ===
- O'Toole, J. (1997). Rough treatment: Teaching conflict management through drama. Teaching Education, 9(1), 83–87.
- O'Toole, J. (2002). Drama: The productive pedagogy. Critical Studies in Education, 43(2), 39–52.
- O'Toole, J. & O'Mara, J. (2007). Proteus, the Giant at the Door: Drama and Theater in the Curriculum, In: Bresler, L. (eds) International Handbook of Research in Arts Education. Springer International Handbook of Research in Arts Education, vol 16. Springer, Dordrecht. https://doi.org/10.1007/978-1-4020-3052-9_13
- O'Toole, J. (2021). The basic principles of a socially just arts curriculum, and the place of drama. The Australian Educational Researcher, 48(5), 819–836.

=== Selected plays ===
- The Beekeeper's Boy. (1986) ISBN 0908156243
- Twilight Valley Blues. In Nine Australian Plays ISBN 0333478142
