= Bridgeman Downs =

- Suburb
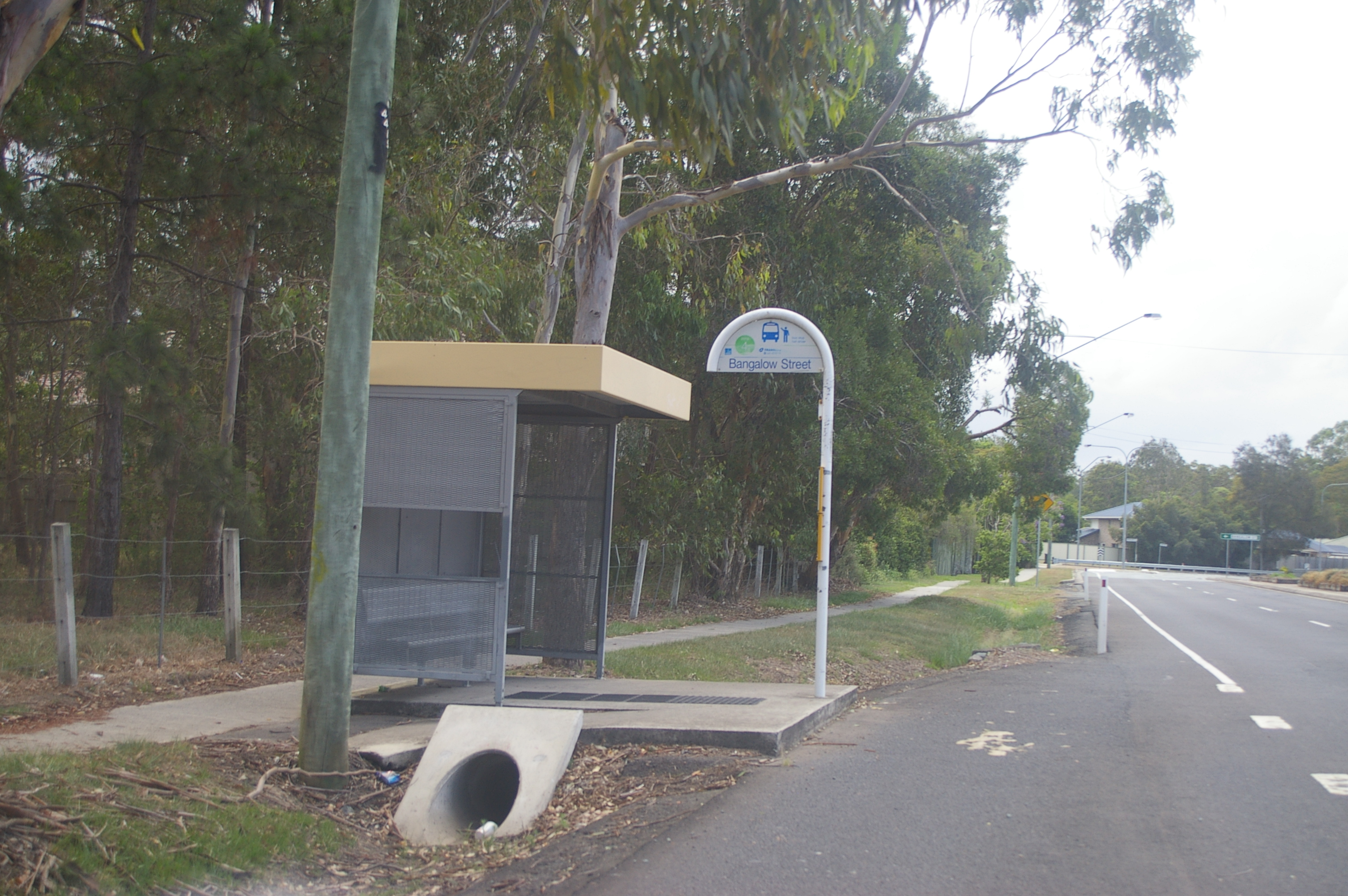
- Bangalow Street bus stop, 2009

- Coordinates: 27.3525°S 152.9927°E
- Country: Australia
- State: Queensland
- City: Brisbane
- LGA: City of Brisbane; (McDowall Ward)
- Location: 15.2 km (9.4 mi) N of Brisbane CBD

Government
  - State electorate: Aspley
  - Federal divisions: Dickson; Lilley; Petrie

Area
  - Total: 9.4 km^{2} (3.6 sq mi)

Population
  - Total: 10,938 (2021 census)
  - Density: 1,164/km^{2} (3,014/sq mi)
- Time zone: UTC+10:00 (AEST)
- Postcode: 4035
Suburbs around Bridgeman Downs
Brendale	Bald Hills	Carseldine
Albany Creek	Bridgeman Downs	Aspley
Albany Creek	McDowall	Aspley

Bridgeman Downs is a northern suburb in the City of Brisbane, Queensland, Australia. It is located 15.2 kilometres (9.4 mi) from the city centre and borders City of Moreton Bay to the west. In the 2021 census, Bridgeman Downs had a population of 10,938 people.

== Geography ==
Bridgeman Downs has long been associated with large acreage properties.

== History ==
In November 1860, Henry St John Bridgeman bought land bounded by Albany Creek Road, Bridgeman Road and Beams Road.

The development of Bridgeman Down as a residential area occurred in the late 1980s and early 1990s.

The Anglican Church of the Resurrection was dedicated and consecrated in 1981.

== Demographics ==
In the 2011 census, Bridgeman Downs recorded a population of 7,445 people, with 51.2% female and 48.8% male. The median age of the Bridgeman Downs population was 40 years of age, 3 years above the Australian median. 74.6% of people living in Bridgeman Downs were born in Australia, compared to the national average of 69.8%; the next most common countries of birth were England 4.5%, New Zealand 2.4%, India 1.9%, South Africa 1.7%, Fiji 1.2%. 84.1% of people spoke only English at home; the next most popular languages were 2.3% Italian, 1.4% Cantonese, 1.2% Hindi, 0.9% Mandarin, 0.7% Afrikaans.

In the 2016 census, Bridgeman Downs had a population of 8,440 people.

In the 2021 census, Bridgeman Downs had a population of 10,938 people.

== Education ==
There are no schools in Bridgeman Downs. The nearest government primary schools are Bald Hills State School in neighbouring Bald Hills to the north, Aspley State School and Aspley East State School both in neighbouring Aspley to the east, McDowall State School in neighbouring McDowall to the south, and Albany Creek State School in neighbouring Albany Creek to the west. The nearest government secondary schools are Aspley State High School in Aspley, Craigslea State High School in Chermside West to the south-east, and Albany Creek State High School in Albany Creek.

== Amenities ==
Shopping villages such as Mcdowall village and Metro on Beckett service the southern part of the suburb. As the Aspley Hypermarket services the top half. Major shopping centres that are close include Brookside Shopping Centre, Stafford City Shopping Centre, Aspley Hypermarket and Westfield Chermside.

Bridgeman Downs has a number of churches:

- Victory Church
- Bridgeman Baptist Community Church
- Bridgeman Downs Christian Outreach Centre
- C3 Church
- Anglican Church of the Resurrection at 30 Ridley Road (27.3522°S 153.0038°E).

The Pinnaroo Cemetery and Crematorium is located at Graham Street in Bridgeman Downs.

There are a number of parks in the suburb, including:

- Albany Creek Road Park (no.245) (27.3575°S 153.0031°E)
- Albany Creek Road Reserve (27.3520°S 152.9848°E)
- Althorp Road Park (27.3711°S 152.9950°E)
- Bangalow Street Park (no.192) (27.3651°S 153.0012°E)
- Beckett Road Park (27.3735°S 152.9918°E)
- Camelot Place Park (27.3433°S 152.9817°E)
- Canopus Street Park (27.3626°S 152.9916°E)
- Chermside Hills Reserve (27.3718°S 153.0001°E)
- Clarrie Beckingham Reserve (27.3644°S 152.9849°E)
- Coolabah Crescent Park (27.3650°S 152.9982°E)
- Darien Street Park (no.29) (27.3581°S 152.9892°E)
- Fiddlewood Place Park (27.3683°S 152.9929°E)
- Flametree Street Park (27.3490°S 153.0017°E)
- Habitat Place Park (27.3720°S 152.9908°E)
- Kensington Place Park (27.3566°S 153.0025°E)
- Laguna Place Park (27.3321°S 153.0063°E)
- Myrtle Crescent Park (27.3628°S 153.0007°E)
- Parkview Place Park (27.3600°S 152.9867°E)
- Pat Rafter Park (27.3419°S 153.0090°E)
- Roghan Road Park (no.2105) (27.3336°S 152.9946°E)
- Solar Park (27.3706°S 152.9847°E)
- Tallowwood Place Park (27.3684°S 152.9962°E)
- Travorten Drive Park (27.3336°S 153.0054°E)
- Wattle Close Park (27.3660°S 152.9935°E)
- Wendon Way Park (27.3613°S 152.9851°E)

== Transport ==
Public buses operate regularly throughout the day, with Beckett Road being the main corridor.
