= Bald Hills, Queensland =

Bald Hills
- Suburb
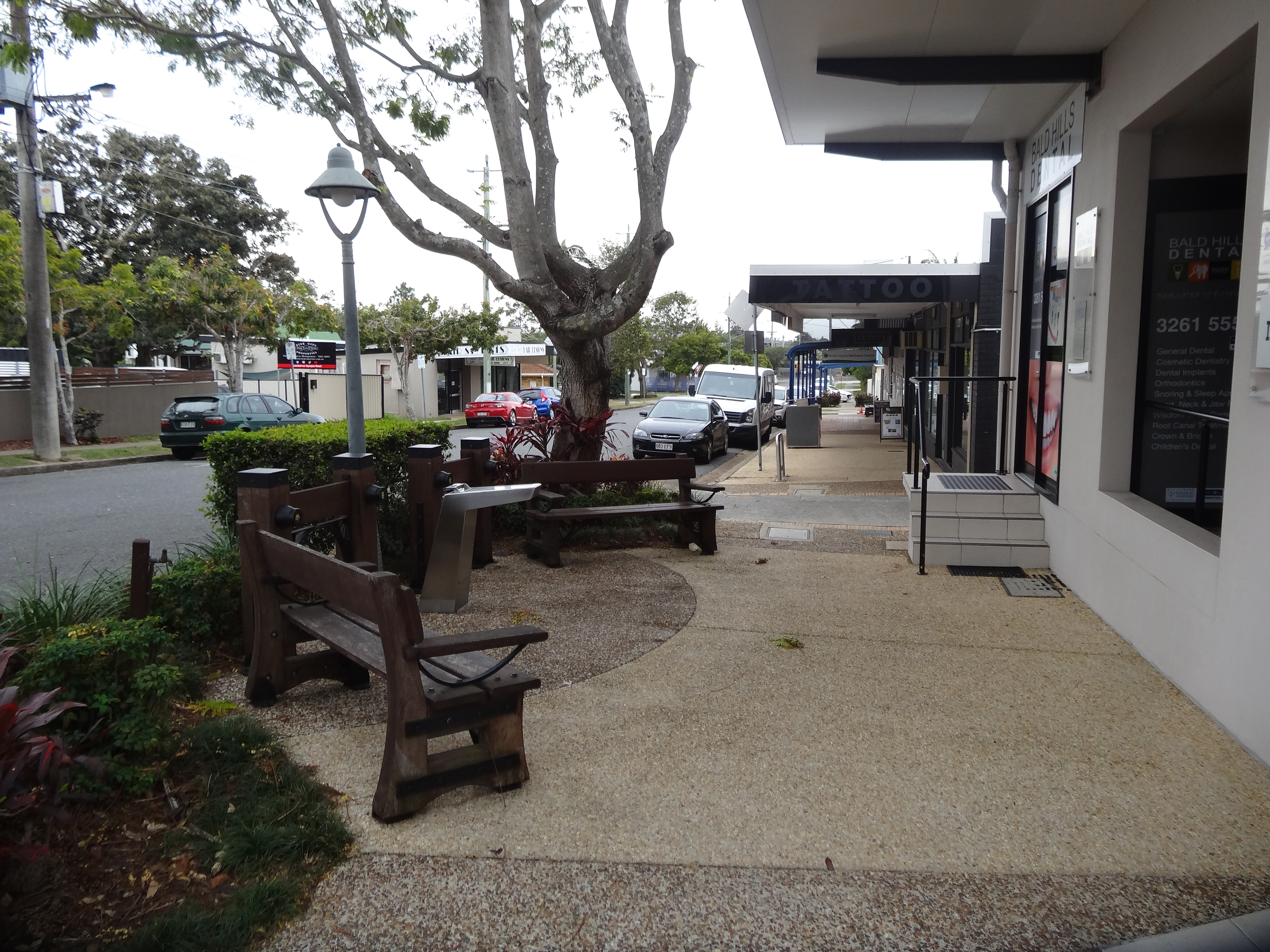
- Bald Hills CBD, 2023

- Interactive map of Bald Hills
- Coordinates: 27.3083°S 153.0122°E
- Country: Australia
- State: Queensland
- City: Brisbane
- LGA: City of Brisbane (Bracken Ridge Ward)
- Location: 7.8 km (4.8 mi) N of Aspley; 18.1 km (11.2 mi) N of Brisbane CBD
- Established: 1857

Government
  - State electorates: Sandgate; Aspley
  - Federal division: Petrie

Area
  - Total: 12.9 km^{2} (5.0 sq mi)

Population
  - Total: 7,000 (2021 census)
  - Density: 540/km^{2} (1,410/sq mi)
- Time zone: UTC+10:00 (AEST)
- Postcode: 4036
Suburbs around Bald Hills
Lawnton; Strathpine	Murrumba Downs	Griffin
Brendale	Bald Hills	Brighton; Bracken Ridge
Bridgeman Downs	Carseldine	Fitzgibbon

Bald Hills is the northernmost suburb in the City of Brisbane, Queensland, Australia. In the 2021 census, Bald Hills had a population of 7,000 people.

== Geography ==
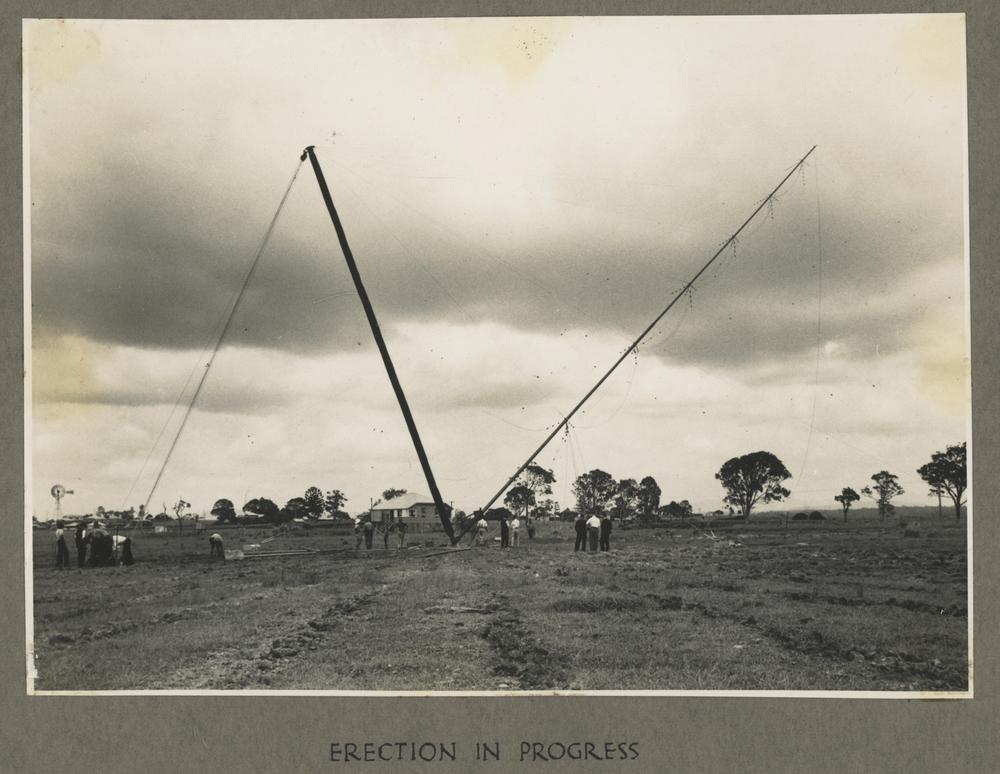
Erection of the Bald Hills radio transmitter, 1942

Bald Hills is a largely residential suburb. It is mostly surrounded by bushland, but in the last few years some of the bush areas have been cleared to make way for new residential areas. It also borders onto the Bald Hills Flats – a large flood plain on the western side of the suburb that is used for cattle grazing. The South Pine River flows through the flood plain and forms the western border of the suburb. The South Pine River converges with the North Pine River and the combined flow, Pine River, forms the northern border. Along the banks of Pine River within Bald Hills is a large environmental park called the Tinchi Tamba Wetlands Reserve. The Pine River empties into Bramble Bay, between Redcliffe and Brighton.

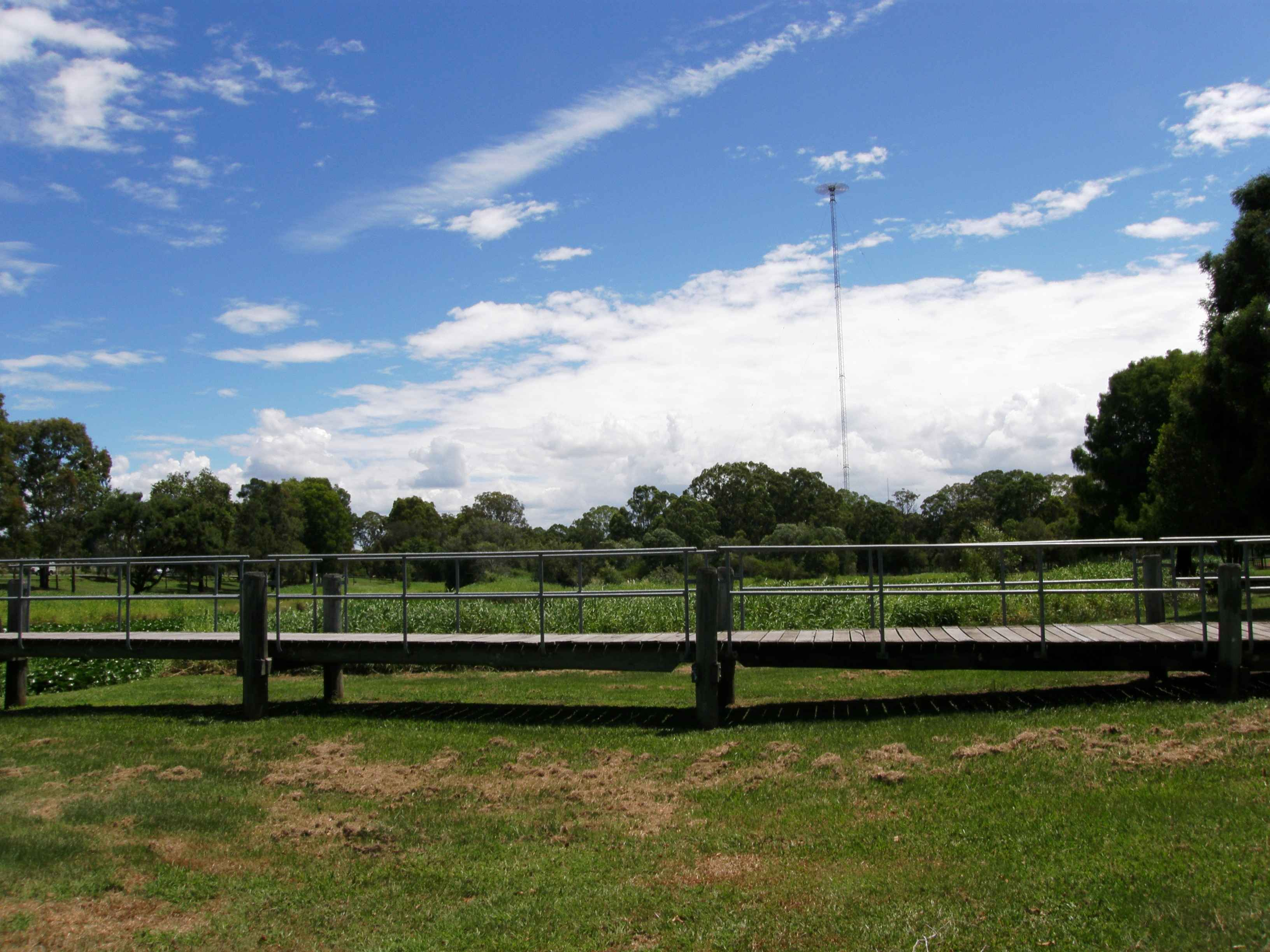
Harold Kielly Park with ABC Radio Tower

The Bruce Highway goes between Bald Hills to Woree in Cairns and is 1,656 kilometres (1,029 mi) long.

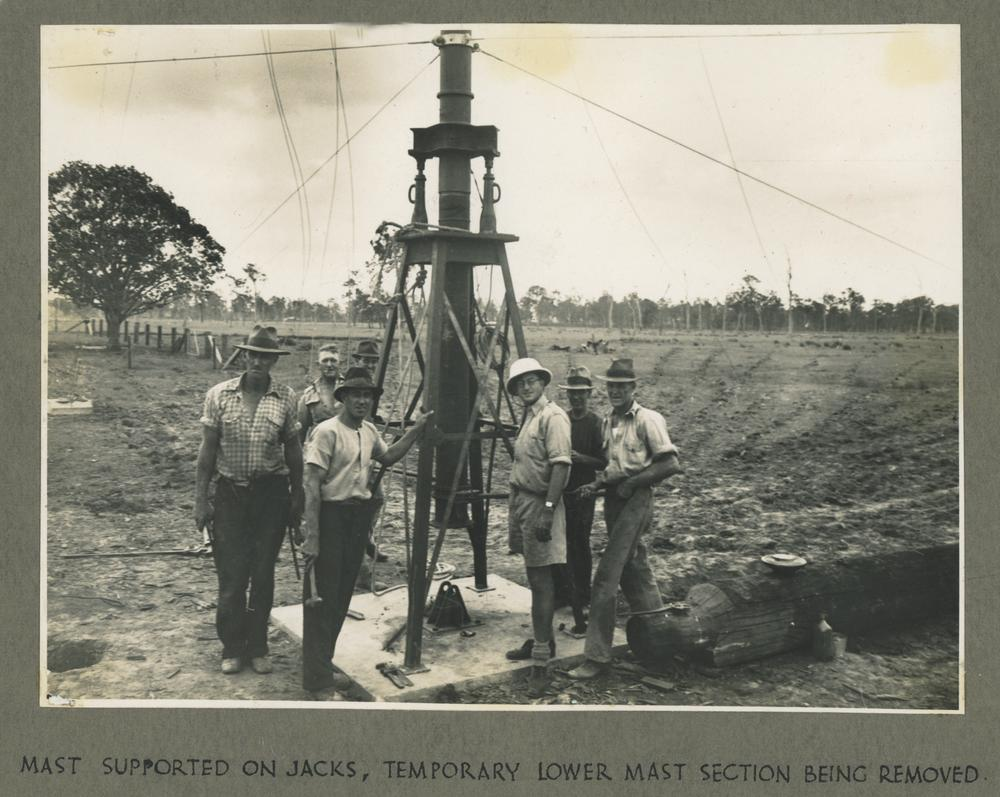
Preliminary supports for the radio transmitter mast at Bald Hills, 1942

The most prominent structure is the Bald Hills Radiator, the ABC's 198-metre (650 ft) tall AM radio transmission tower located on the eastern side of the suburb.

== History ==
Bald Hills is situated in the Yugarabul traditional Aboriginal country.

The suburb is named after the two small hills in the South Pine River Valley floor.

The first land sales in the area occurred in 1857. Land sales around the Bald Hills railway station were advertised in April 1886. At the time the journey from Brisbane was described as "after travelling across the Downfall and Cabbage Tree Creeks, the traveller arrives at a long stretch of road, at the extremity of which rises a lofty knoll, round the brow of which the road winds, when the Bald Hills are reached".

In 1888, the "Bald Hills Railway Station Estate" made up of 500 allotments was advertised to be auctioned by Arthur Martin & Co., auctioneers. A map advertising the auction indicates that the land is situated near Bald Hills railway station and special trains will be provided on the day of the sale.

Bald Hills State School began enrolling students on 30 April 1866 with the first school building opened on 24 September 1866.

St Paul's School opened on 31 January 1961.

== Demographics ==
In the 2011 census, Bald Hills had a population of 5,965 people.

In the 2016 census, Bald Hills had a population of 6,502 people, 50.8% female and 49.2% male. In 2016, the median age of the Bald Hills population was 36 years of age, 2 years below the Australian median of 38. 76.7% of people living in Bald Hills were born in Australia, compared to the national average of 66.7%; the next most common countries of birth were New Zealand 4%, England 3.4%, Philippines 1.8%, India 1.7%, Fiji 0.7%. 88.8% of people spoke only English at home; the next most popular languages were 0.9% Tagalog, 0.6% Punjabi, 0.6% Spanish, 0.5% Telugu, 0.5% Hindi. The most common ancestry backgrounds of at least one of the parents for Bald Hills residents were English 27.5%, Australian 26.9%, Irish 7.9%, Scottish 7.7% and German 4.5%. The median weekly incomes for residents of Bald Hills aged 15 years and over was reported to be $725 which was higher than the Australian and Queensland personal incomes (at $662 and $660 respectively). This wealthier-than-average income was reflected in a higher-than-average household income for residents of this suburb. In Bald Hills, median household income was $1,584, compared to $1,438 in Australia and $1,402 in Queensland.

In the 2021 census, Bald Hills had a population of 7,000 people.

== Heritage listings ==
Bald Hills has a number of heritage-listed sites, including:

- Bald Hills Radiator, 99 Kluver Street
- Hoop Pines, 34 Strathpine Road
- Bald Hills Presbyterian Church, 56 Strathpine Road

== Education ==
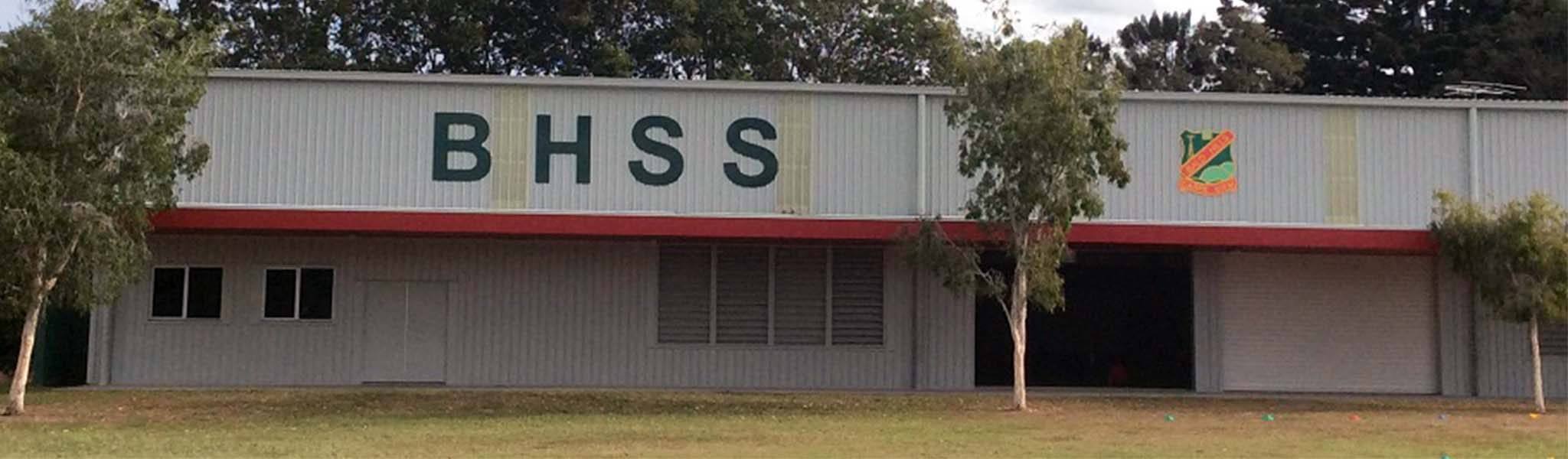
Bald Hills State School, 2019

Bald Hills State School is a government primary (Prep–6) school for boys and girls at 2156 Gympie Road (27.3200°S 153.0068°E). It includes a special education program. In 2018, the school had an enrolment of 621 students with 42 teachers (38 full-time equivalent) and 29 non-teaching staff (17 full-time equivalent). In 2022, the school had an enrolment of 616 students.

St Paul's Anglican School is a private primary and secondary (Prep–12) school for boys and girls at 34 Strathpine Road (27.3164°S 153.0042°E). In 2018, the school had an enrolment of 1,206 students with 96 teachers (90 full-time equivalent) and 73 non-teaching staff (64 full-time equivalent). In 2019, it won the Australian School of the Year Award. In 2022, the school had an enrolment of 1,282 students.

There is no government secondary school in Bald Hills. The nearest government secondary schools are Bracken Ridge State High School in neighbouring Bracken Ridge to the east, Pine Rivers State High School in neighbouring Strathpine to the north-west, and Aspley State High School in Aspley to the south.

== Facilities ==
Bald Hills is home to the breeding and training centre for Guide Dogs for the Blind Association of Queensland.

== Amenities ==
Bald Hills is the home of the Bald Hills-Lawnton Lions Cricket Club, as well as Ridge Hills United Football Club.

Bald Hills Uniting Church is at 2131 Gympie Road (27.3216°S 153.0092°E).

Due to proximity to North Pine River, Bald Hills has a large number of green and open spaces. Parks include, but not limited to:

- Tinchi Tamba Wetlands Reserve (also known as Deepwater Bend Reserve, Pine River Wetlands)
- St Martin Court Park with Shared pathway and water (bubbler/tap)
- Harold Kielly Park with a picnic area and shelter
- John Stewart Memorial Park with Picnic area/shelter with electric barbecue, playground, rebound wall and water (bubbler/tap)
- Harold Kielly Park with Picnic area/shelter with electric barbecue, playground and shared pathway
- Chris Brunton Park (previously known as Hoyland Street Park (no. 6)) with Outdoor fitness/exercise circuit, picnic area/shelter and water (bubbler/tap)
- Canterbury Park with Designated drone launching area, barbecue (electric), bikeway, dog off-leash area, outdoor fitness/exercise trail, basketball/netball facility (basketball half court), picnic area/shelter (Rush Worth Street), playground (Rush Worth Street), water (bubbler/tap/dog bowl), wetlands (Feuerriegel Road) and cricket field
- Barungwarra Bushland Reserve (South Pine Pocket Reserve) with Boat ramp (Pine River), dog off-leash area and vehicle access

== Transport ==
Bald Hills railway station provides access to regular Queensland Rail City network services to Brisbane and Springfield Central, as well as Kippa-Ring. There are also many buses serving the area. The suburb is crossed by both Gympie Road and the northern end of the Gateway Motorway. The southern end of the Bruce Highway is located here as well.
