= Bald Hills railway station =

Railway station in Queensland, Australia

Bald Hills
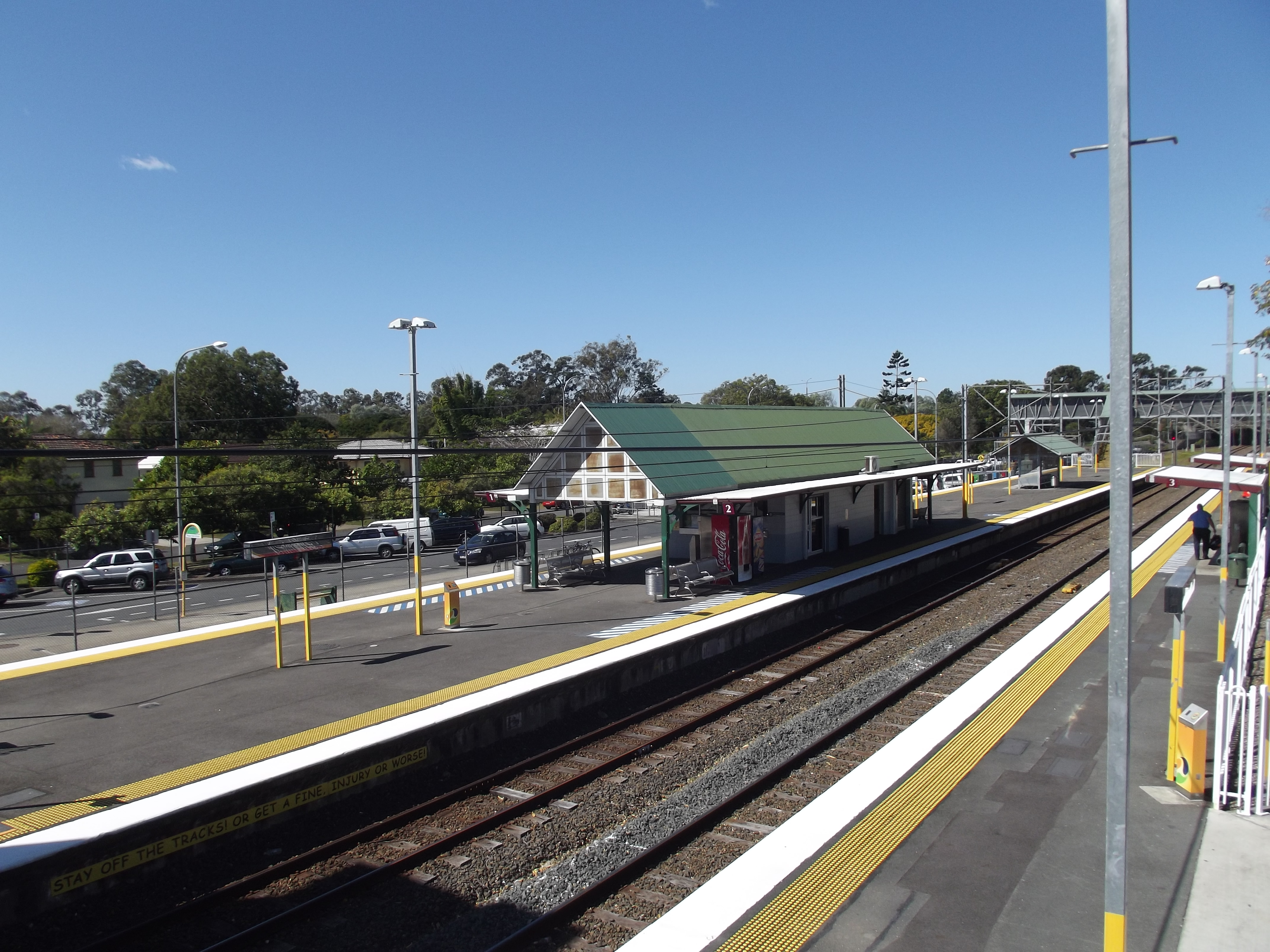
- Southbound view of the station platforms in August 2012

General information
- Location: Cullimore Street, Bald Hills
- Coordinates: 27.3208°S 153.0110°E
- Owner: Queensland Rail
- Operator: Queensland Rail
- Line: Redcliffe Peninsula
- Distance: 20.02 kilometres from Central
- Platforms: 3 (1 side, 1 island)

Construction
- Structure type: Ground
- Parking: 147 bays
- Accessible: Yes

Other information
- Status: Staffed
- Station code: 600452 (platform 1); 600453 (platform 2); 600454 (platform 3)
- Fare zone: Zone 2
- Website: Queensland Rail

History
- Opened: 1888; 138 years ago

Services
Preceding station	Queensland Rail	Following station
Carseldine towards Springfield Central via Roma Street	Redcliffe Peninsula line	Strathpine towards Kippa-Ring
Location

Bald Hills is a railway station operated by Queensland Rail on the Redcliffe Peninsula line. It opened in 1888 and serves the Brisbane suburb of Bald Hills. It is a ground level station, featuring one island platforms with two faces each and one side platform.

== History ==
On 28 August 2000, a third platform opened as part of the addition of a third track from Northgate.

== Services ==
Bald Hills is served by all Citytrain network services from Kippa-Ring to Central, many continuing to Springfield Central.

== Services by platform ==
Bald Hills platform arrangement
Platform	Line	Destinations	Notes
1	Redcliffe Peninsula	Roma Street & Springfield Central	
1	Redcliffe Peninsula	Ipswich	1 weekday afternoon service only
2	Redcliffe Peninsula	Kippa-Ring	Evening peak only
3	Redcliffe Peninsula	Kippa-Ring	
