= Carseldine =

- Suburb
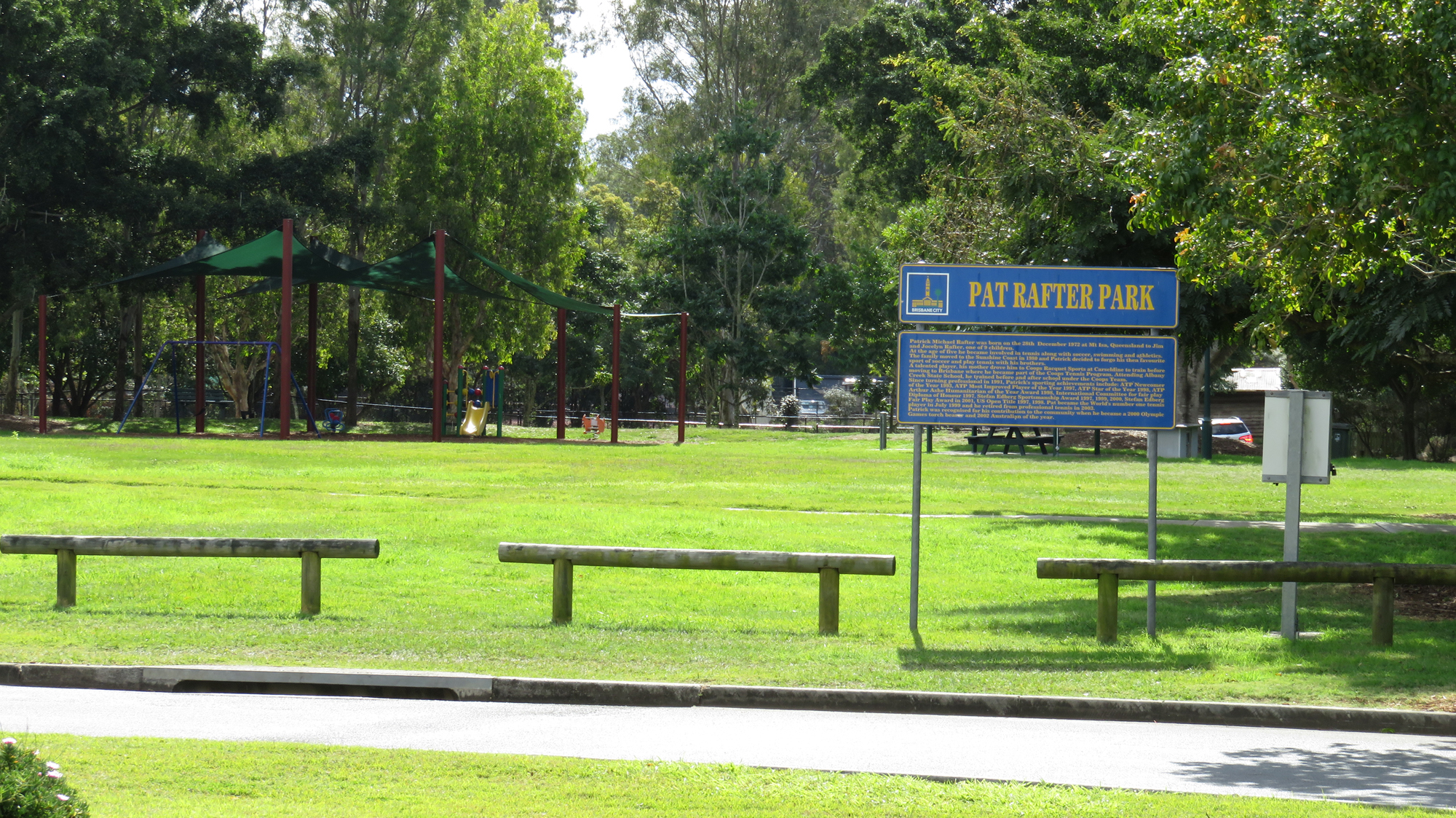
- Pat Rafter Park

- Interactive map of Carseldine
- Coordinates: 27.3466°S 153.0177°E
- Country: Australia
- State: Queensland
- City: Brisbane
- LGA: City of Brisbane (Bracken Ridge Ward)
- Location: 14.9 km (9.3 mi) N of Brisbane CBD

Government
  - State electorate: Aspley
  - Federal division: Petrie

Area
  - Total: 5.0 km^{2} (1.9 sq mi)

Population
  - Total: 10,093 (2021 census)
  - Density: 2,019/km^{2} (5,230/sq mi)
- Time zone: UTC+10:00 (AEST)
- Postcode: 4034
Suburbs around Carseldine
Bald Hills	Bald Hills	Fitzgibbon
Bridgeman Downs	Carseldine	Fitzgibbon
Bridgeman Downs	Aspley	Zillmere

Carseldine is a suburb in the City of Brisbane, Queensland, Australia. In the 2021 census, Carseldine had a population of 10,093 people.

== Geography ==
Carseldine is about 16 kilometres (10 mi) north and about a half-hour drive from the Brisbane central business district.

The suburb is bounded by the North Coast railway line to the east with the Carseldine railway station (27.3472°S 153.0288°E) serving the suburb. Gympie Road enters the suburb from the south (Aspley) and exits to the north-west (Bald Hills).

Carseldine is a mainly residential suburb in the north of Brisbane.

== History ==
Carseldine was named on 16 August 1975 by the Queensland Place Names Board after the fencing contractor William Carseldine (also written as Castledean) who immigrated in 1854 in the sailing ship Monsoon and settled in Bald Hills in 1858, also owning land in the Carseldine area.

North Brisbane College of Advanced Education opened in 1975 with the pre-existing Kedron Park Teachers College and with a new campus at Carseldine (27.3491°S 153.0241°E). It later became a campus of the Queensland Institute of Technology and then as a campus of the Queensland University of Technology (QUT). In November 2008, QUT relocated its Carseldine activities to its Kelvin Grove and Gardens Point campuses. The site was vacant for four years when QUT failed to find a replacement education provider, but was adapted to house state public servants in 2012. In 2016, Deputy Premier Jackie Trad announced that the site would be redeveloped as the Carseldine Urban Village, with 900 homes and commercial and retail space.

== Demographics ==
In the 2016 census, Carseldine had a population of 9,541 people, with 52.9% female and 47.1% male. The median age of the Carseldine population was 40 years of age, 2 years above the Australian median. Children aged under 15 years made up 16.7% of the population and people aged 65 years and over made up 22.1% of the population. 64.1% of people living in Carseldine were born in Australia, compared to the national average of 66.7%; the next most common countries of birth were India 4.6%, New Zealand 4.1%, England 3.1%, Philippines 1.9% and South Africa 1.6%. 73.8% of people only spoke English at home. Other languages spoken at home included Mandarin 1.8%, Hindi 1.8%, Cantonese 1.5%, Italian 1.5% and Malayalam 1.3%. The most common responses for religion were Catholic 30.2%, No Religion 21.9% and Anglican 12.6%.

In the 2021 census, Carseldine had a population of 10,093 people.

== Heritage listings ==
Heritage-listed sites in Carseldine include:

- 736 Beams Road: Holy Spirit Centre (also known as Holy Spirit Convent)
- 112 Graham Road: Elliot Farmhouse (also known as Graham Farmhouse)
- 2 Hawbridge Street: Brisbane Mud Springs Park (also known as Aspley Mud Mounds)

== Education ==
There are no schools in Carseldine. The nearest government primary schools are Aspley East State School in neighbouring Aspley to the south, Bald Hills State School in neighbouring Bald Hills to the north-east, and Taigum State School in Taigum to the east. The nearest government secondary school is Aspley State High School in neighbouring Aspley to the south.

Holy Spirit College, a Catholic secondary school in neighbouring Fitzgibbon, also serves families in the Carseldine area.

== Facilities ==
Carseldine Police Station is at 1615 Gympie Road (27.3507°S 153.0145°E).

== Amentities ==
There are a number of parks in the suburb, including:

- Allira Crescent Park (27.3436°S 153.0262°E)
- Aspley Rest Park (27.3572°S 153.0149°E)
- Balcara Avenue Park (27.3461°S 153.0278°E)
- Beams Road Park (no.440) (27.3516°S 153.0339°E)
- Bensara Place Park (27.3571°S 153.0087°E)
- Bowden Street Park (27.3530°S 153.0188°E)
- Boxwood Place Park (27.3365°S 153.0192°E)
- Chateau Street Park (27.3465°S 153.0082°E)
- Cowie Road Park (27.3392°S 153.0201°E)
- Dannenberg Street Park (27.3360°S 153.0150°E)
- Hawbridge Street Park (27.3551°S 153.0121°E)
- Kentia Street Park (27.3568°S 153.0054°E)
- Lacey Road Park (27.3377°S 153.0167°E)
- Macaranga Crescent Park (27.3398°S 153.0131°E)
- Matisse Street Park (27.3453°S 153.0207°E)
- Matthew Gardiner Park (27.3506°S 153.0198°E)
- Nilkerie Street Park (27.3461°S 153.0257°E)
- Pat Rafter Park, named after tennis champion Pat Rafter (27.3417°S 153.0091°E)
- Philip Vaughan Park (27.3592°S 153.0094°E)
- Ray Street Park (27.3423°S 153.0201°E)
- Strawberry Farm Park (27.3486°S 153.0140°E)

== Transport ==
The suburb includes Carseldine railway station, located on the eastern side of the suburb. This provides Carseldine with regular train services, connecting to the Brisbane central business district and northern suburbs. Also, Carseldine is well serviced by buses operated by the Transport for Brisbane. A new road flyover is under construction near Carseldine railway station on Beams Road, intended to improve traffic flow and reduce congestion between Carseldine and Fitzgibbon.

In the 2016 census, 15.4% of employed people travelled to work on public transport and 67.9% travelled by car (either as driver or as passenger).
