= Bald Hills Radiator =

Radio transmission centre in Brisbane, Australia

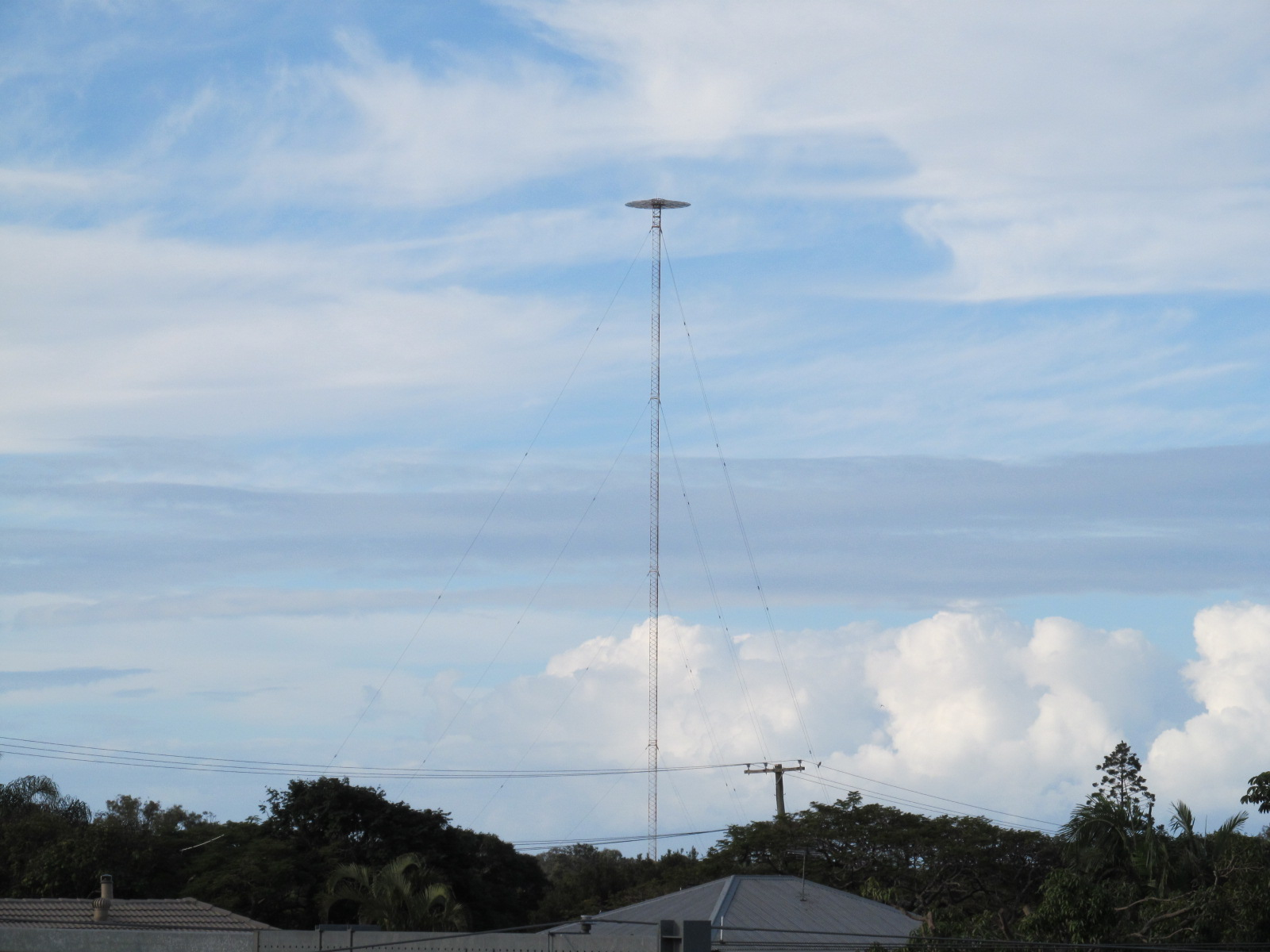
- ABC tower Bald Hills, 2013

- Location within Queensland
- 27.3115°S 153.0174°E
- Location: 99 Kluver St, Bald Hills, City of Brisbane, Queensland, Australia

Site notes
- Area: 43 hectares (110 acres)

Brisbane Heritage Register
- Official name: National Broadcasting Service Radio Transmission Centre
- Reference no.: 153

Bald Hills Radiator is a radio transmission centre at 99 Kluver St, Bald Hills, City of Brisbane, Queensland, Australia. It is also known as the National Broadcasting Service Radio Transmission Centre. It is listed on the Brisbane Heritage Register. The centre transmits all the Brisbane AM radio programmes of the Australian Broadcasting Corporation (ABC).

The site and infrastructure is now owned by BAI Communications who are contracted to broadcast ABC radio and TV signals nationally.

== History ==
=== Prior to the 1940s: 4QG and 4QR ===
Initially, radio transmission was totally from within the Brisbane city centre. The first transmitter for radio station 4QG was located in an inner courtyard in the Executive Building in the Brisbane city centre. Operated by the Queensland Government, it started transmitting in 1925. A more powerful transmitter replaced it in 1926, on the eighth floor of the then new State Government Insurance Building (from 1933 known as the Taxation building) at the corner of George and Elizabeth Streets. The involvement of the Australian Broadcasting Commission (now the Australian Broadcasting Corporation, ABC) started in 1930, with the Postmaster General's Department (PMG) being responsible for technical operation. Major modifications were made to the transmitter during the ABC's use of the transmitter.

In 1935, a survey team from the Postmaster General (PMG) Research Laboratories in Melbourne selected the Bald Hills site, then a farm, as a future location for a possibly high-powered transmitter for 4QG, but no land acquisition occurred at that time. At that stage radio station 4QG had been in existence for ten years (since 27 July 1925), and the National Broadcasting Service (NBS, later the ABC) for five years (since 31 January 1930).

Radio station 4QR was officially opened in 1938, with transmission from the roof of the Central Automatic Exchange Building in Elizabeth Street.

=== The move to Bald Hills ===
At the start of World War II, Brisbane's skyline was dominated by five high aerial towers, of which two served 4QG and one 4QR. A further two towers served commercial stations.

Land acquisitions for the current Bald Hills site commenced in 1940. The first aerial was erected on the site in 1941; it was constructed from 8 inches (200 mm) and 6 inches (150 mm) bore casing and was 262 feet (80 m) high. The transmitter building was made of brick with a fibro roof. It was built by Thomas Frederick of Days Road, Wilston, under a contract awarded in July 1941, and work had started by October 1941. The farm buildings were removed at about this time.

In March 1942 General Douglas MacArthur arrived in Australia to be appointed supreme commander of the Allied Forces in the South-West Pacific. The AMP Building in Queen Street, Brisbane, (now the MacArthur Chambers) was chosen for MacArthur's headquarters because of its central location and reinforced concrete roof. It was feared that the presence of all these high aerial towers would act as a navigational aid for Japanese aircraft seeking to attack MacArthur's headquarters. This accelerated the need to shift the transmitters out of the city centre.

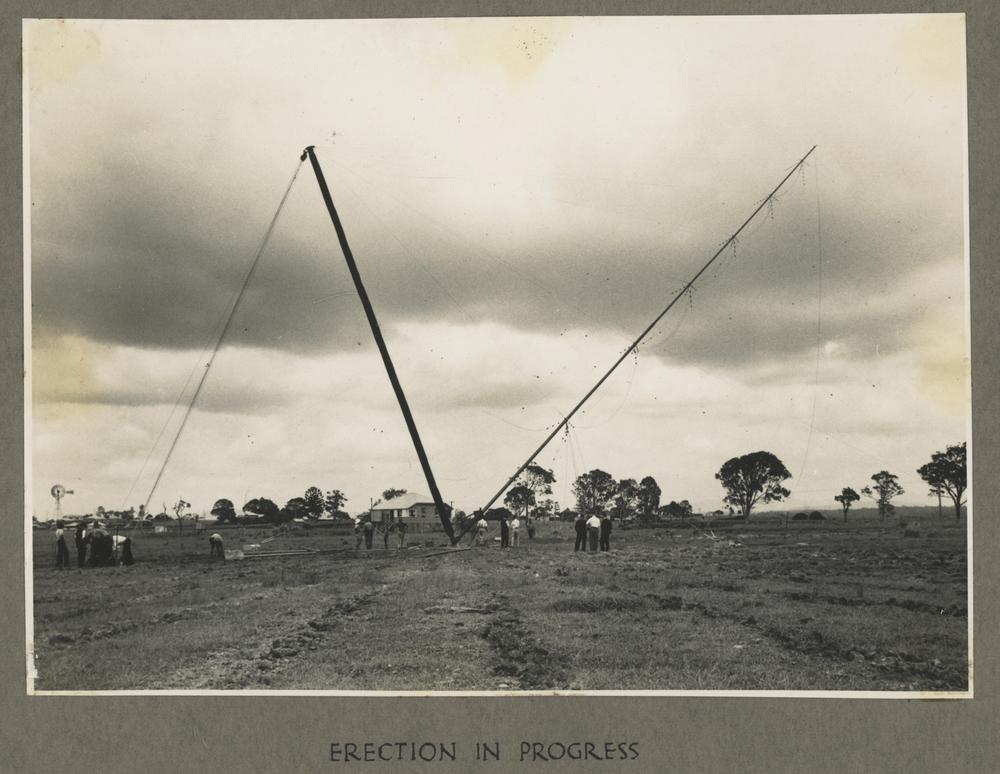
Erection of the Bald Hills radio transmitter, 1942

The first transmission from the Bald Hills site was of 4QR, on 24 March 1942, using the transmitter moved the previous night from the Central Telephone Exchange in the city. In April 1942, the 4QG transmitter was also relocated to Bald Hills but not to this site but to another Bald Hills site leased from the commercial station 4BH. Known as Fischle's Jam Factory, the 4BH site was at Roghan Road near Neville Road, next to Fischle's. Bald Hills residents of the time were not impressed by this transfer of risk of Japanese attack to their area.

As the Queensland segment of the National Broadcasting Service (NBS) was restricted to Brisbane, Rockhampton and Townsville, it was proposed to use high frequency (short wave) transmission to give some cover to the rest of Queensland. VLQ first went to air on 17 February 1943, transmitted by STCA880A.

Land acquisitions for the present site continued through to July 1943 when the Australian Government resumed the 114 acre (46ha) property from J W Guy.

The transmitter building was extended from 1945 to 1946, while the existing vertical radiator was erected in 1947. The building was further extended 1962, and has since been internally modified at least twice when equipment was upgraded: once in 1968 and again in about 1994.

In two later stages, (c 1970, 1980) there were minor reductions in the land holding of the site, for road widening and subdivisional redevelopment. The current area of the site is 43ha.

== Description ==
The National Broadcasting Service Radio Transmission Centre is an approximately 43 hectares (110 acres) site at 99 Kluver Street on the corner of Bracken Ridge Road, Bald Hills, facing west into Kluver Street and bounded by Taragon Street in the south and Hoyland Street in the east.

The VLQ STCA880A transmitter is a very early model high powered (10 kW) high frequency transmitter. It is built from very old technology, its design and construction pre-dating both the transistor and the silicon chip.

Relying on extremely large glass and metal radio valves, the final amplifier valves requiring a water cooling system, the transmitter in operation supplemented by a sound effect as the cooling system pump and fan operated. In a paper presented to the Institution of Engineers, Australia shortly before his death, Sanderson wrote:

"These early units with prolific meters and open mesh panels, behind which the large glass transmitting valves glowed cherry red, contrasting with the strange blue pulsating plasmas of the mercury vapour rectifiers, had a personality and character which is totally lacking in the sterile steel boxes, the state of the art highly complex, almost non repairable transmitters of the 90s."

Particular qualities of the STCA880A are its robustness and its reliability, evidenced by the decades of high quality service it gave before it was finally retired, mainly because the valves vital for its operation finally went out of production. It was in either full-time or reserve service for forty five years, from 1943 until 1988.

The Bald Hills unit was the third of its type, preceded by one at Laverton and another at Ballarat, both for the RAAF. It was the first NBS short wave transmitter in Queensland and the second in Australia. Its NBS predecessor, code named VLR, was operated from Victoria. It was not of the same type.

To cool the anodes of the power output valves, duplicate pumps powered by 3–4 hp 2,900 RPM three-phase electric motors were installed in an adjoining room. A fan cooled external radiator was installed on a patio adjacent to the pump room. As the anodes operate at 12,000 volts, low conductivity cooling water was essential, and a still was installed to ensure a continual supply.

The existing main vertical radiator is a triangular section lattice steel structure, 204m high and with 8 ft (2.44m) sides, guyed at four levels in three directions. The earth system consists of 120 copper wire buried radials, each 200m long. The mast was energised by separate six wire lines, each 460m long but these have been replaced with an underground low-loss coaxial cable. The antenna is a dual-frequency anti-fading design built to radiate two frequencies simultaneously (612 KHz & 792 kHz) and minimise the skywave to reduce fading at the fringes of ground wave coverage at night

Two smaller masts have also been erected at the site, one being to radiate the ABC NewsRadio service and the other as a standby mast for the 200m main mast.

The main building lies on the western (high) side of the site. It was first used to accommodate the 4QR transmitter, which was shifted overnight on 23–24 March 1942.

Other buildings include:

- the foreman mechanic's residence, 1944
- the emergency engine house, 1950
- the coupling hut, 1962
- the transmitters

Other original transmitters at the site included:

- Stand by (10 kW) 4SU-11A (1948
- Stand by (2 kW) 4SU-16C (1951; ex 4QN Clevedon, 1960)
- 4QG main (10 kW) 4SU-64 (1963)
- 4QR main (50 kW) 4SU-38 (1963)

The medium wave transmitters were eventually replaced with solid-state Nautel ND series transmitters that use a Class-D amplifier containing MOSFET devices. The shortwave transmitters were then decommissioned, the VLQ9 and VLM4 services were discontinued and the shortwave curtain array antennas removed.

=== Condition ===
The original VLQ transmitter is completely preserved and housed in its original 1943 location.

== Significance ==
The VLQ transmitter STCA880A (1943) constructed for the National Broadcasting Service was the first high frequency transmitter in Queensland and the second in Australia. It is the last of its type in the world and is a relic of a period when high frequency (short wave) transmissions were the most favoured means of broadcasting to country areas. It was used extensively on broadcasts to Papua New Guinea. It was at the vanguard of the era of shortwave transmission which started when it and the Bald Hills centre were both new.

It illustrates an important phase of the very rapid development of the National Broadcasting Service's Queensland operations. This phase began at a relatively early stage in the history of the radio broadcasting in Australia. It enabled access for the first time to radio services for communities in inland and remote centres, thereby reducing their isolation.

The transmitter is of totally Australian design and has a very high content of Australian manufacture, only meters and valves being imported. Its operation was water cooled, a technological practice of the time and was in either full-time or reserve service for forty five years, from 1943 until 1988. It is completely preserved, housed in its original 1943 location.

The transmitter is probably the only surviving example of this short wave transmitter type. The design by STC dates from the late 1930s. It has been recommended that the equipment should be retained as a broadcasting heritage exhibit.

The other transmitters on the site form, with STCA880A, Australia's largest collection under one roof of retired and operating radio transmitters. Dating from 1948 or possibly earlier, they are, except for one recovered from 4QN Clevedon in 1960, in their original locations.

The significance of the site lies essentially in its connection with the transmitters. The aerial, erected in 1947, has become a well known local landmark.

Their significance attaches to the transmitting equipment housed in the main building, a unit purpose built in 1941–42 and modified or extended on at least four occasions since.

== Legacy ==
Two series of photographs were taken of the erection of the first aerial in 1941 and of its spectacular demolition in 1987. These, with annotations by the late Douglas Sanderson, were presented by the Institution of Engineers Australia, to the John Oxley Library in 1994.
