= Carseldine railway station =

Railway station in Queensland, Australia

Carseldine
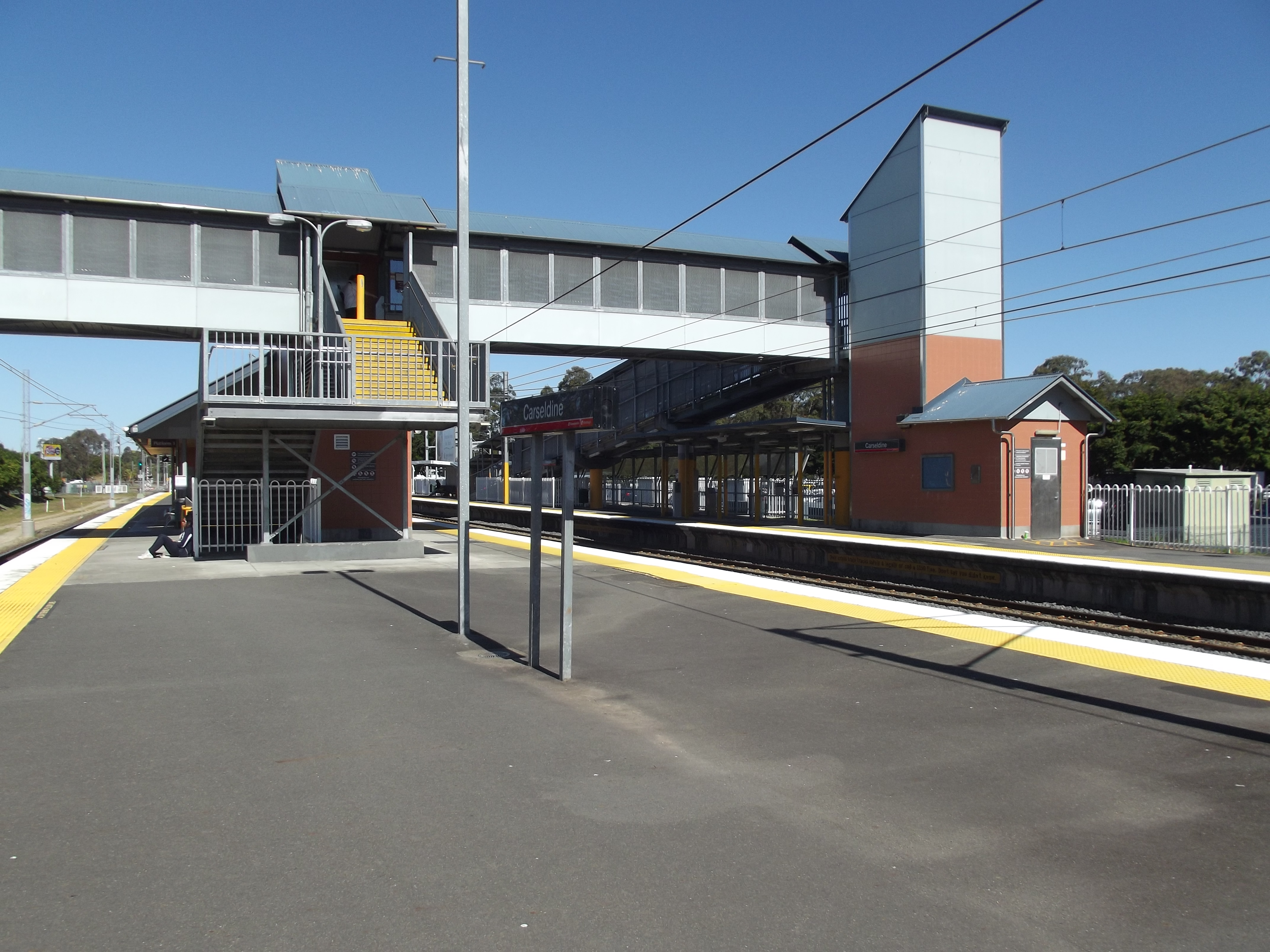
- Southbound view from Platform 1 in August 2012

General information
- Location: Balcara Avenue, Carseldine
- Coordinates: 27.3473°S 153.0289°E
- Owner: Queensland Rail
- Operator: Queensland Rail
- Line: Redcliffe Peninsula
- Distance: 16.64 kilometres from Central
- Platforms: 3 (1 side, 1 island)

Construction
- Structure type: Ground
- Parking: 210 bays
- Accessible: Yes

Other information
- Status: Staffed part-time
- Station code: 600449 (platform 1); 600450 (platform 2); 600451 (platform 3)
- Fare zone: Zone 2
- Website: Queensland Rail

History
- Opened: 25 June 1986; 40 years ago

Services
Preceding station	Queensland Rail	Following station
Zillmere towards Springfield Central via Roma Street	Redcliffe Peninsula line	Bald Hills towards Kippa-Ring
Location

Carseldine is a railway station operated by Queensland Rail on the Redcliffe Peninsula line. It opened in 1986 serves the Brisbane suburbs of Carseldine and Fitzgibbon. It is a ground level station, featuring one island platforms with two faces each and one side platform.

== History ==
In September 1985, the Queensland Government provided funding to build Carseldine station in the state budget. The station was opened by the Minister for Transport Don Lane in June 1986. Lifts were installed in 1999. On 28 August 2000, a third platform opened as part of the addition of a third track from Northgate to Bald Hills.

== Services ==
Carseldine is served by all Citytrain network services from Kippa-Ring to Central, many continuing to Springfield Central.

== Services by platform ==
Carseldine platform arrangement
Platform	Line	Destinations	Notes
1	Redcliffe Peninsula	Roma Street, Milton & Springfield Central	
1	Redcliffe Peninsula	Ipswich	1 weekday afternoon service only
2	Redcliffe Peninsula	Kippa-Ring	Evening peak only
3	Redcliffe Peninsula	Kippa-Ring	

== Transport links ==
Transport for Brisbane operates one bus route to and from Carseldine station:

- 340: to Woolloongabba station
