= Aspley, Queensland =

Aspley
- Suburb
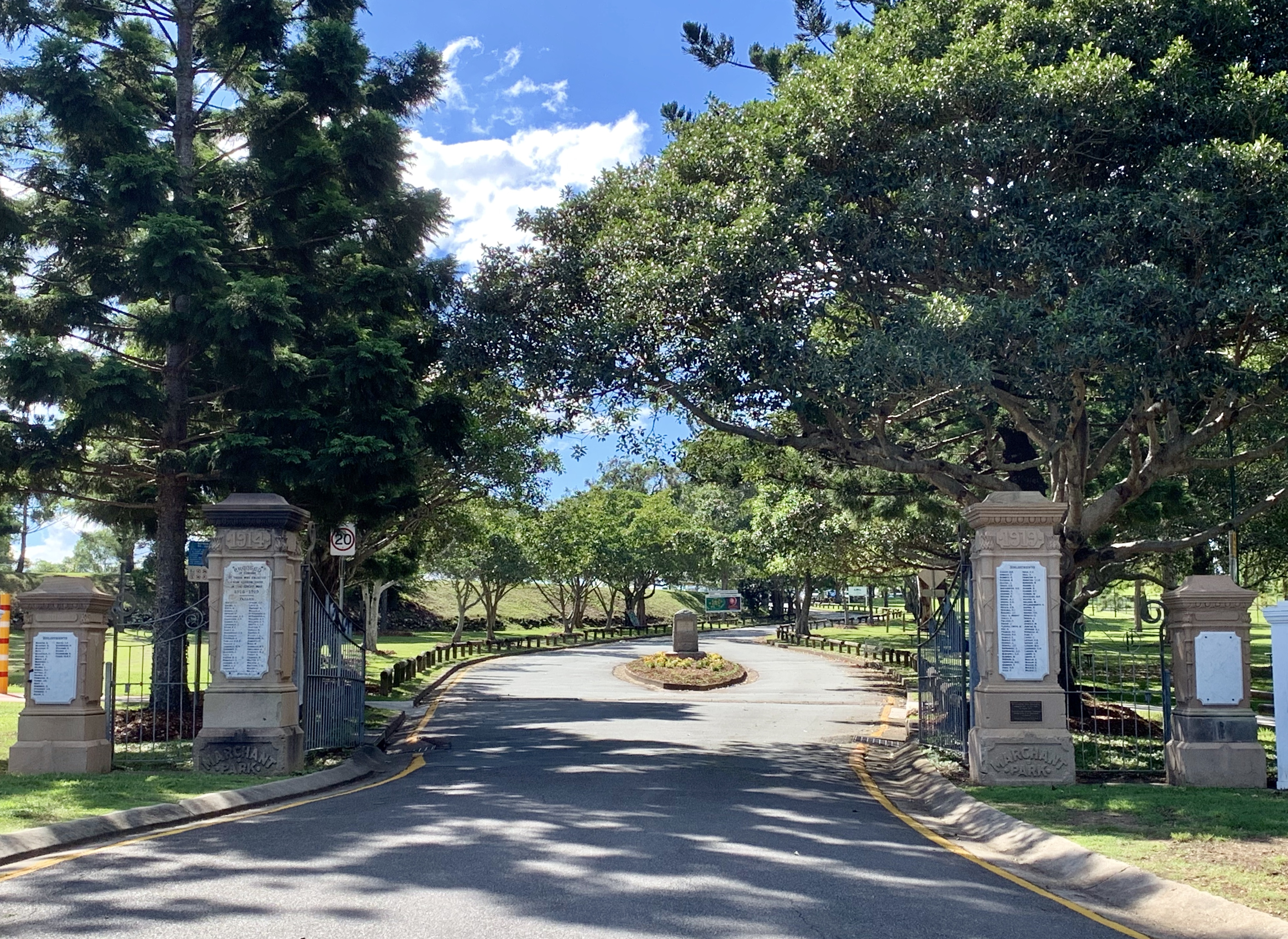
- Marchant Park Memorial Gates

- Interactive map of Aspley
- Coordinates: 27.3636°S 153.0191°E
- Country: Australia
- State: Queensland
- City: Brisbane
- LGA: City of Brisbane (Bracken Ridge Ward,Marchant Ward and McDowall Ward)
- Location: 13.4 km (8.3 mi) N of Brisbane CBD

Government
  - State electorate: Aspley
  - Federal divisions: Lilley; Petrie

Area
  - Total: 6.5 km^{2} (2.5 sq mi)
- Elevation: 23 m (75 ft)

Population
  - Total: 12,871 (2021 census)
  - Density: 1,980/km^{2} (5,130/sq mi)
- Time zone: UTC+10:00 (AEST)
- Postcode: 4034
Suburbs around Aspley
Bridgeman Downs	Carseldine	Zillmere
Bridgeman Downs	Aspley	Geebung
McDowall	Chermside West	Chermside

Aspley is a northern suburb in the City of Brisbane, Queensland, Australia. In the 2021 census, Aspley had a population of 12,871 people.

== Geography ==
Aspley is located about 13 kilometres (8.1 mi) north and about a half-hour drive north of the Brisbane central business district. It is positioned on flat ground south of Cabbage Tree Creek, centred on Little Cabbage Tree Creek and on the surrounding hills to the east and south.

== History ==
Prior to European settlement, Australian aborigines of the Duke of York clan lived in the local area, though their main camping ground was further south in the suburb now known as Herston. The Duke of York clan was part of the Turrbal tribe who occupied the area north from Logan River, south of the North Pine River, east of Moggill Creek to Moreton Bay.

Soon after Brisbane was declared a free settlement in 1842, Europeans began exploring the lands north of Brisbane City. The suburb was originally known as North Chermside until the mid 1970s. A northern route followed aboriginal tracks through what is now Kelvin Grove, Enoggera, Everton Hills, Albany Creek onto North Pine.

After the separation of Queensland from New South Wales in 1859, subsequent subdivisions were much smaller.

Originally known as Soldiers Flat and then Little Cabbage Tree Creek, the area became officially called Aspley in 1897. The name is believed to refer to the Aspley Orangery and Aspley Vineyard owned by John Morris in 1860s. Morris came from Nottinghamshire in England where there was an Aspley Hall.

In the following five years, land parcels south of Zillmere Road/Graham Road in what is now recognised as Aspley began. In 1865, subdivisions west of what is now Maundrell Terrace were sold at the Brisbane Land Sales. In 1866, subdivisions between what is now Gympie Road, Maundrell Terrace and Webster Road were auctioned. The subdivisions were named "Soldier's Flat". Initially, the area was known as "Little Cabbage Tree Creek District". The immigrants were primarily of English and German ancestry.

In late October 1867, gold was discovered in Gympie, Queensland. By this time, a road from Brisbane City to Kedron Brook had been completed with the Bowen Bridge opened in 1860, permitting the northern track along Gympie Road and Albany Creek Road to be used as an alternate route to the Old Northern Road. However, neither road was of good quality. On 8 May 1868, the Government announced that it had allocated 2700 pounds to construct a trafficable, more direct, road to the Gympie goldfields. The new road came through Kedron Brook, Downfall Creek, Little Cabbage Tree Creek before heading to Bald Hills and North Pine. This road is now known as Gympie Road and travels a route very different from the original aboriginal track.

With increased traffic on Gympie Road, the Royal Exchange Hotel was established in 1875 opposite the intersection of Gympie Road and Albany Creek Road. It also operated as a general store for a while with Cobb and Co coaches passing on their way to the Gympie goldfields. In 1934, a second building was built south of the original hotel. The new building was called the "Aspley Hotel".

In the early 1870s, a vineyard was established by the Morris family on their property bounded by Maundrell Terrace, Gympie Road and Terrence Street. It was named the "Aspley Vineyard", after "Aspley Hall" in Nottingham, England. The vineyard operated for over twenty years. In 1897, Little Cabbage Tree Creek District was renamed Aspley.

From 1879, all northern districts of Brisbane were within the local government area of Nundah Division. In 1883, Toombul Division separated. In 1886, the Nundah Division was subdivided into three smaller local government area. In 1903, Nundah Division become the Shire of Kedron as it was no longer based in Nundah. On 1 October 1925, the Shire of Kedron was integrated into Greater Brisbane.

Matthew's Farm in 1887, which would become the site of Aspley State School

Little Cabbage-tree Creek State School opened on 6 August 1890. Before it was built, students would infrequently attend classes at the schools in Bald Hills or Zillmere. Initial sites for the new school were not approved by the Government before finally accepting the location on the corner of Maundrell Terrace and Horn Road. In 1897, the school was renamed Aspley State School. In the latter part of the 19th century, Aspley was essentially a farming district. Additional industries were established to support the farming industry. In the 1880s, John Smith Booth established a bone mill and sawmill on Little Cabbage Tree Creek and Albany Creek Road. It later relocated to the current location of the former Aspley Acres Caravan Park and finally closed in 1932. In 1888, Huttons Pty Ltd established a meat processing plant in nearby suburb Zillmere. It contributed greatly to the local economy of Aspley, providing an alternative employment for farmers during poor seasons. A blacksmith operated on the northern corner of Gympie Road and Albany Creek Road until the 1920s. Several slaughter houses operated along Little Cabbage Tree Creek.

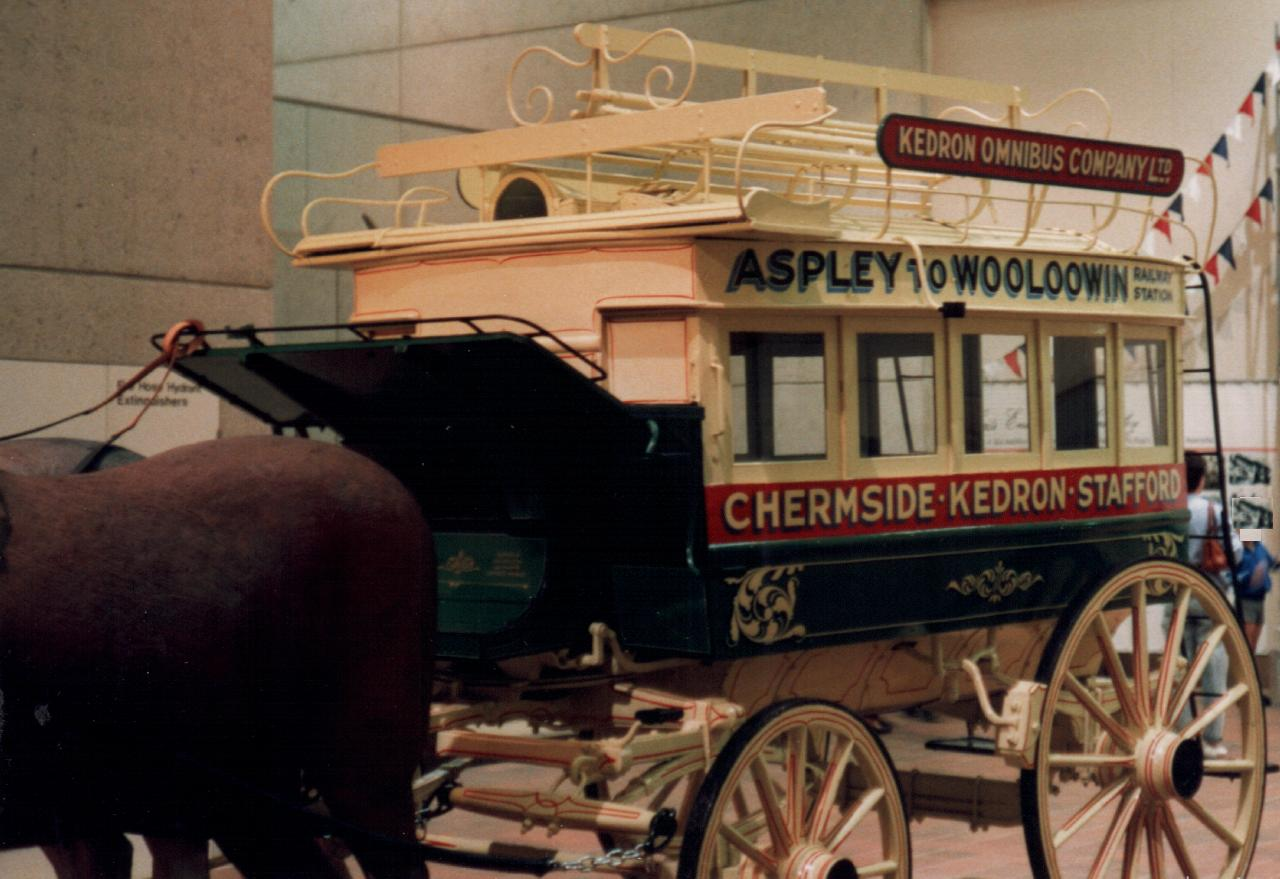
The Kedron Omnibus company provided horse-powered transport services to Aspley - Coach on display at the Queensland Museum, Toowoomba

In 1912, the Kedron Omnibus company was formed by locals and ran local services to Wooloowin Station after previous services were cancelled as an aftermath of the 1912 transport strike.

Before and during World War I, the land now known as Marchant Park was variously used as the home of artillery and light horse units. On 9 September 1921, the land was donated by its owner, soft drink manufacturer George Marchant to create Marchant Park.

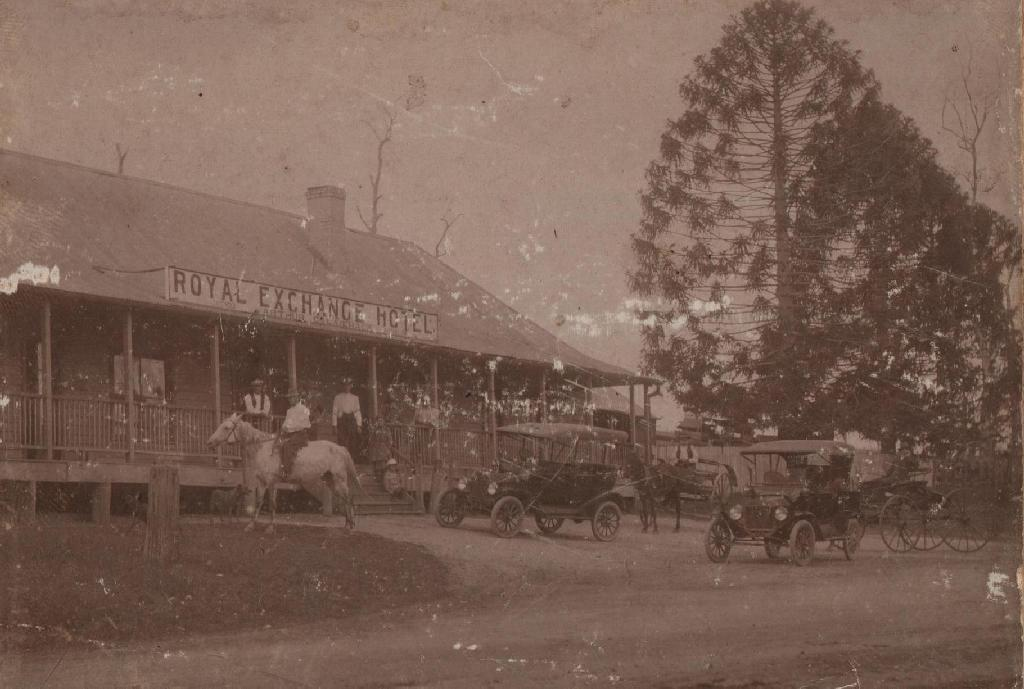
The Royal Exchange Hotel (circa 1925) served as a Cobb & Co pickup point as the coaches did not change horses until Strathpine and "watering hole" for bullock teams.

After World War I and into the 1920s, Aspley experienced some growth in the number of businesses present in the district. Griffiths Sweet Factory operated on Gympie Road between 1930 and 1950 after shifting from Windsor. Hedges Dripping Factory operated near the reservoir on Lawrence Road. A brickworks was established by the Granville family on Brickfield Road during the 1930s.

In 1918, the Aspley Assembly Hall (a local community hall) was built on Gympie Road. A year later, movies were presented inside the hall. In 1950 the hall was sold to become St Paul's Anglican Church. The church was dedicated by Bishop Administrator John Hudson on 10 March 1963. It closed on 24 October 1981 as the land was resumed for road purposes.

The Methodist services were held in the Aspley Assembly Hall from 1918. In 1932 the congregation acquired one acre of land on Robinson Road for a church. on 8 October 1932, the foundation stone was laid and the church was erected for £350. A hall was opened on 23 November 1958, and its extension was opened on 25 October 1964. With the creation of the Uniting Church in Australia in 1977, it became the Aspley Uniting Church. In 1984 the former St Philip's Presbyterian Church in Aspley (which also became part of the Uniting Church) officially merged with the Aspley Uniting Church and St Philip's was closed. The foundation stone for the current church was laid on 14 October 1984 by the Reverend Rolland Busch, the President of the Uniting Church in Australia with the new church officially opening on 24 November 1985.

On Sunday 25 June 1933, Archbishop James Duhig laid the foundation stone for St Dympna's Catholic Church. Duhig returned on Sunday 17 September 1933 to officially open the church. This church was demolished and replaced by a new church in 1974 called Aspley Catholic War Memorial Church of Our Lady and St Dympna.

By the 1960s, the suburban development of the local area necessitated building additional school and churches.

St Philip's Presbyterian Church was officially opened on 7 February 1960 by the Right Reverend Robert McCann Park, Moderator of the Presbyterian State Assembly. It was located on the corner of Petanne Street and Summerfield Street (approx 27.3586°S 153.0219°E). Following the creation of the Uniting Church in Australia in 1977, St Philip's joined the Uniting Church. As the former Aspley Methodist Church also became a Uniting Church, it was decided to merge the congregations and close St Philip's with a final service in St Philip's on 1 February 1984.

St Dympna's Catholic Primary School, established by the Sisters of St Joseph, opened on 24 January 1963.

Aspley East State School opened on 29 January 1963. It became one of the largest and most popular primary schools on Brisbane's north side, drawing students from a wide area. In 2013, Aspley East State School celebrated its 50th anniversary.

Aspley State High School opened on 29 January 1963. It was originally to be called Zillmere State High School but was renamed on 17 January 1963.

Aspley Special School opened on 6 November 1973.

== Demographics ==
In the 2011 census, Aspley recorded a population of 12,594 people and comprises 52.4% females and 47.6% males. The median age of the Aspley population was 40 years of age, 3 years above the Australian median. 74% of people living in Aspley were born in Australia, compared to the national average of 69.8%; the next most common countries of birth were New Zealand 4.4%, England 3.5%, India 1.4%, Italy 1.1%, Philippines 1%. 84.1% of people spoke only English at home; the next most popular languages were 1.9% Italian, 1.1% Cantonese, 1% Mandarin, 0.6% Hindi, 0.5% Greek.

In the 2016 census, Aspley had a population of 12,108 people.

In the 2021 census, Aspley had a population of 12,871 people.

== Transport ==
Aspley is primarily accessed by Gympie Road, the primary artery in Brisbane's northern suburbs. Other primary roads are Albany Creek Road to the west and Robinson Road to the east.

Public transport is provided by buses operated by Transport for Brisbane, Translink, Hornibrook Bus Lines. Brisbane's tram network originally terminated just south of Aspley on Gympie Road at Chermside. The closest railway stations are Geebung and Zillmere.

In the 1961 Brisbane City Council Town Plan, the concept of a northern suburbs' expressway between Bowen Hills and Aspley was first proposed. The expressway would travel along the eastern side of Lutwyche Road to Park Road at Kedron, take a northerly route to Chermside and through the eastern side of Aspley, before heading north-westerly through Carseldine to connect with the Bruce Highway north of Bald Hills.

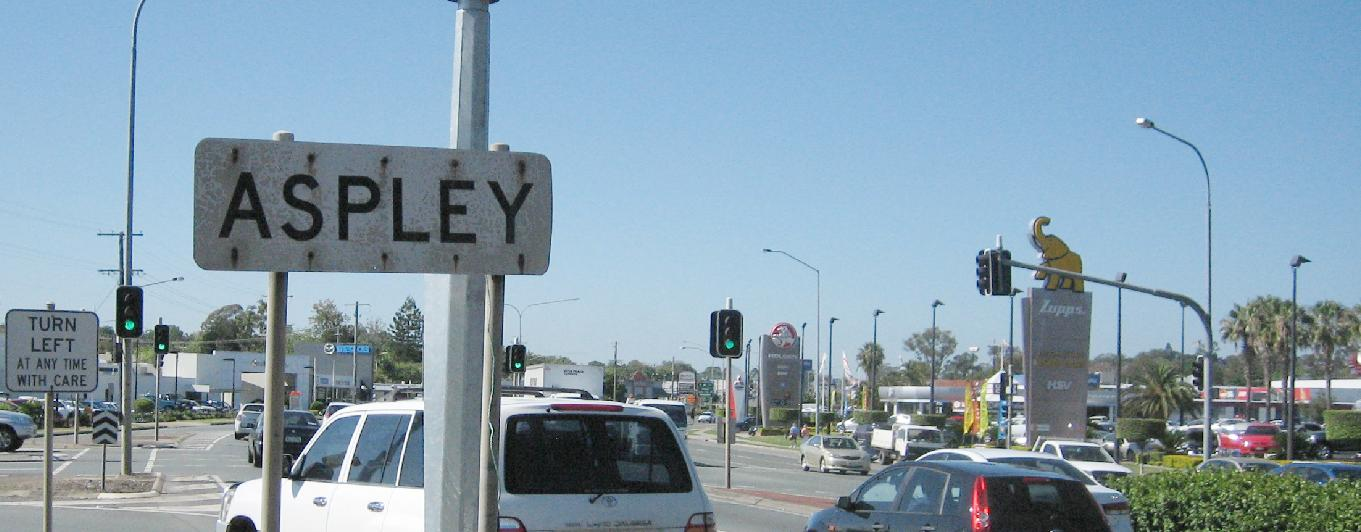
Gympie Road

The freeway system was to be constructed between 1965 and 1985 in four five-year stages. However, by 1972, opposition was voicing concerns about inadequate compensation for resumed properties, the housing crisis at the time, and neglected public transport. By 1975 the freeway plan had been abandoned due to community opposition and funding issues.

Land planning in the 1980s has protected the land corridor of the original Northwest Freeway between Alderley and Carseldine. The corridor is most obvious in the suburb running parallel to Trouts Road in the suburb's west. It is referred to as the Northwest Transport Corridor and remains in current planning standards as a four-lane median-divided road . There is speculation that the corridor may form part of a western bypass road which will link the Western Freeway with the Bruce Highway. Another proposal has been for a light-rail system to connect Caboolture and Ferny Grove lines.

== Education ==
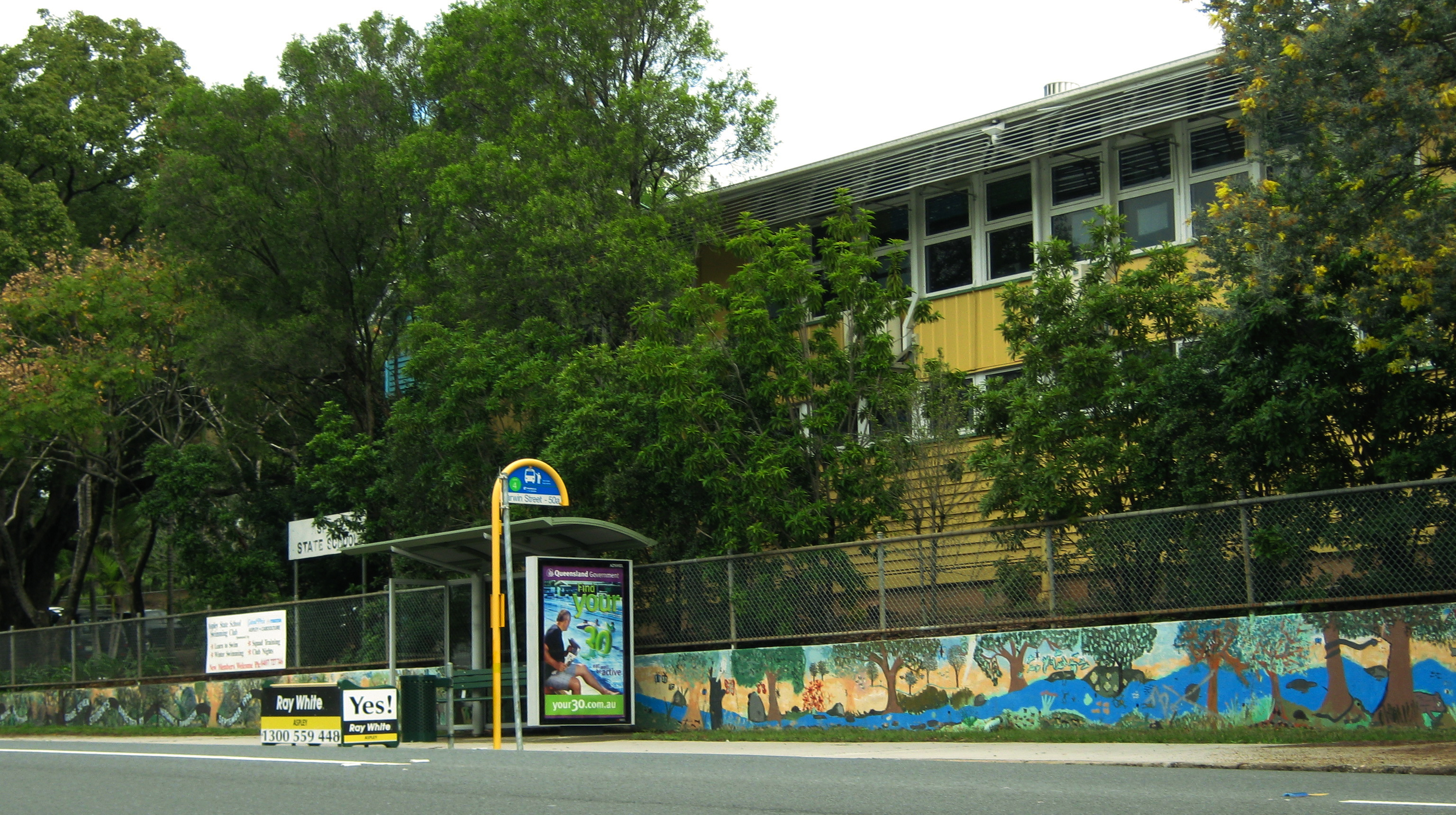
Aspley State School in 2008

Aspley State School is a government primary (Early Childhood to Year 6) school for boys and girls at Maundrell Terrace (27.3698°S 153.0145°E). In 2018, the school had an enrolment of 718 students with 50 teachers (45 full-time equivalent) and 26 non-teaching staff (19 full-time equivalent). It includes a special education program.

Aspley East State School is a government primary (Prep–6) school for boys and girls at 31 Helena Street (27.3623°S 153.0239°E). In 2018, the school had an enrolment of 880 students with 64 teachers (56 full-time equivalent) and 42 non-teaching staff (25 full-time equivalent). It includes a special education program.

St Dympna's Catholic Primary School is a Catholic primary (Prep–6) school for boys and girls at 491 Robinson Road (27.3660°S 153.0327°E). In 2018, the school had an enrolment of 693 students with 44 teachers (37 full-time equivalent) and 34 non-teaching staff (20 full-time equivalent).

Aspley State High School is a government secondary (7–12) school for boys and girls at 651 Zillmere Road (27.3571°S 153.0242°E). In 2018, the school had an enrolment of 867 students with 81 teachers (78 full-time equivalent) and 52 non-teaching staff (35 full-time equivalent). It includes a special education program and an intensive English language program.

Aspley Special School is a special secondary (7–12) school for boys and girls at 751 Zillmere Road (27.3567°S 153.0211°E). In 2018, the school had an enrolment of 87 students with 29 teachers (27 full-time equivalent) and 38 non-teaching staff (24 full-time equivalent).

== Amenities ==
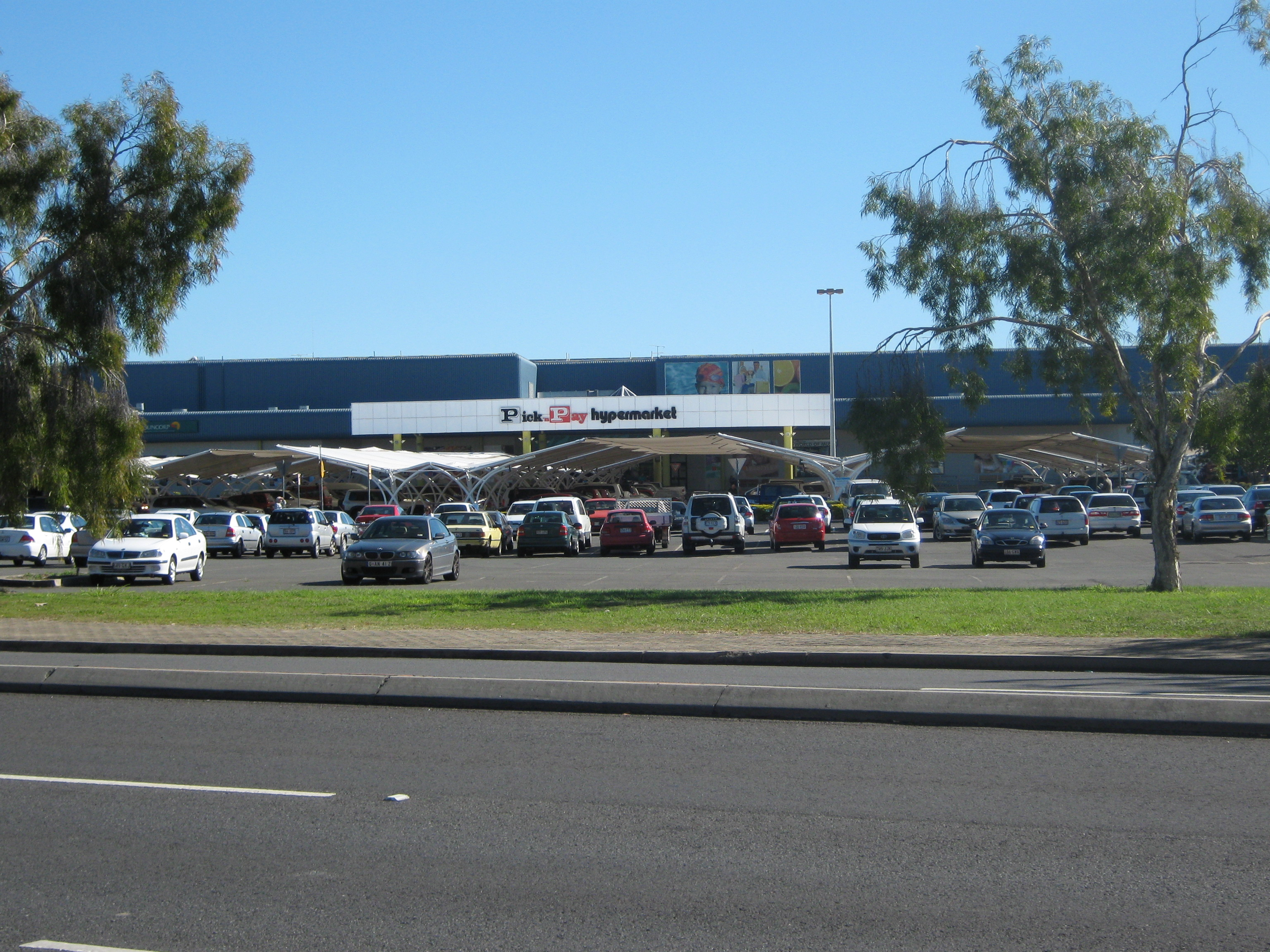
Pick 'n Pay Hypermarket, Aspley

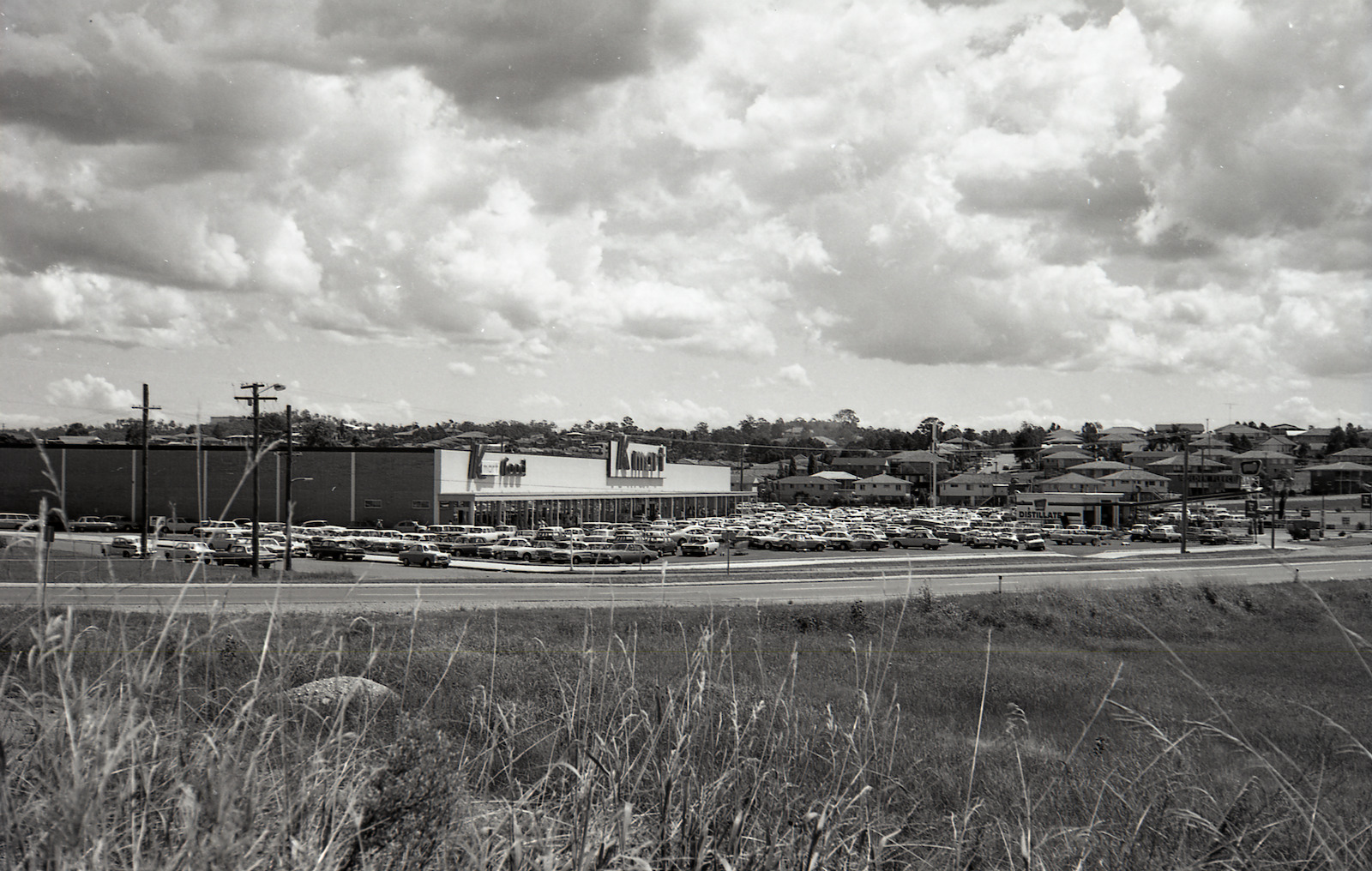
Aspley K-mart (1971)

The Aspley Hypermarket, originally built by South African company Pick 'n Pay in 1984 (owned by Yu Feng and currently managed by Retail First), has a large presence in the suburb of Aspley. This shopping centre services the residents of Aspley, as well as surrounding suburbs of Carseldine, Zillmere, Chermside West, Taigum, Bridgeman Downs and Albany Creek.

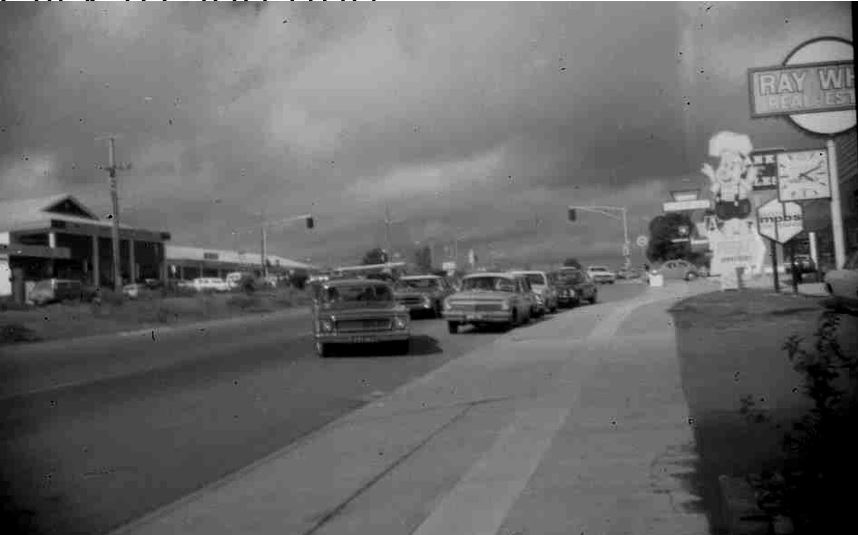
Shops on Gympie Road Aspley c.1972

In December 2008, a shopping complex was opened on Robinson Road, called Aspley Village Shopping Centre, which replaced the old one that was closed down and demolished on the site in 2007. The existing medical centre will also be expanding which will incorporate a gymnasium and aquatic soothing pool that has now been opened. There is also undercover parking for approximately 470 cars. This shopping centre is unique in Brisbane as the only centre to feature a direct entrance from the centre car park into the grounds of a state school - in this case Aspley East State School.

Aspley is serviced by a fortnightly visit by the Brisbane City Council's mobile library service at the corner of Gayford and Albany Creek Roads.

Aspley is home to many denominations and other religious activities, including:

- St Dympna's Catholic Church, 479 Robinson Road West (27.3658°S 153.0337°E)
- Aspley Uniting Church at 748 Robinson Road West (27.3644°S 153.0191°E)

== Sport ==
Aspley is home to the Australian Football Club the Aspley Hornets (situated on Graham Road) and the Aspley Devils Rugby League club (located on Kirby Road).
