= Brisbane College of Advanced Education =

Brisbane College of Advanced Education was a multi-campus Australian higher education institution (College of Advanced Education) from 1982 to 1990.

It was formed on 1 January 1982 with the amalgamation of the North Brisbane College of Advanced Education, Kelvin Grove College of Advanced Education, Mount Gravatt College of Advanced Education and the Brisbane Kindergarten Teachers College. The Brisbane Kindergarten Teachers College had been led by Hazel Harrison who had introduced a new curriculum.

It was broken up in 1990 amidst wider reforms of Australian tertiary education: the Mount Gravatt campus was merged into Griffith University, while the Carseldine, Kedron Park and Kelvin Grove campuses merged into the Queensland University of Technology.
