= North Brisbane College of Advanced Education =

The North Brisbane College of Advanced Education was an Australian higher education institution (College of Advanced Education) from 1975 to 1982.

It was formed on 20 February 1975 combining the existing Kedron Park Teachers College with a new campus at Carseldine.

It expanded beyond its original teaching remit to include courses in business studies, community studies and liberal studies.

It amalgamated with the Kelvin Grove College of Advanced Education, Mount Gravatt College of Advanced Education and the Brisbane Kindergarten Teachers College to form the multi-campus Brisbane College of Advanced Education with effect from 1 January 1982.
