= Aspley State High School =

Location
- 651 Zillmere Road, Aspley; Brisbane, Queensland; Australia; 27.3569°S 153.0245°E

Information
- Type: Co-educational state senior
- Motto: Non Sibi Sed Omnibus (Not for one's self, but for all)
- Established: 1964
- Principal: Jacquita Miller
- Enrollment: 1,081
- Campus: Suburban
- Colours: Red █, blue █ and white █
- Website: aspleyshs.eq.edu.au

Aspley State High School is a secondary school situated in the northern suburbs of Brisbane, in the Australian state of Queensland. As of August 2023 it has a student population of 1,081.

== History ==
Aspley State High School opened on 29 January 1963. It was originally to be called Zillmere State High School but was renamed on 17 January 1963 shortly before it opened.

Aspley State High School was the target of activist attacks for not being a part of the Safe Schools Coalition during the associated 2016 moral panic upon the suicide year 7 student of Tyrone Unsworth, leading to temporary deployment of security guards.

== Events ==
Aspley High students participate in many events throughout the school year, such as the Swimming Carnival, the Athletics Carnival (field and track events) and the Cross Country.

The student population is split up into four houses.

House name	Named after
Florey	Howard Walter Florey
Hinkler	Herbert John Louis Hinkler
Melba	Dame Nellie Melba
Kenny	Sister Elizabeth Kenny

== Publications ==
Aspley High releases a fortnightly newsletter to school members allowing current and recent news to be distributed. In December an annual yearbook named Toora is published. Toora is Aspley's longest running publication, first being released in the school's inaugural year.

== School principals ==
1963–1964	J. A. Robertson
1964–1975	C. H. Martin
1976	B. A. Keogh (acting)
1976–1990	R. Day
1990–2002	I. Issacs
2002–2003	R. Pollock (acting)
2004–2010	J. Schuh
2011–present	J. Miller

== Notable alumni ==
- Mick Doohan (Grand Prix motorcycle road racing world champion)
- Marcia Langton AO FASSA FTSE, Indigenous activist and academic, who was expelled after objecting to racism in a school text, despite being a prefect and good student
- Greg Norman (golfer)
- Leigh Sales (ABC journalist and host of 7.30)
- Brad Thorn (Rugby league and rugby union dual international)

== See also ==
- Lists of schools in Queensland
- Education in Australia
